= Japan National Route 424 =

National highway in Wakayama Prefecture, Japan

National Route 424
- 国道424号
- National Route 424 highlighted in red

Route information
- Length: 113.0 km (70.2 mi)
- Existed: 1982–present

Major junctions
- South end: Wakayama Prefecture Route 31 in Tanabe
- National Route 42; Hanwa Expressway; National Route 425; National Route 480; National Route 370
- North end: National Route 24 in Kinokawa

Location
- Country: Japan

Highway system
- National highways of Japan; Expressways of Japan
← National Route 423	→ National Route 425

National Route 424 (国道424号, Kokudō Yonhyaku ni-jūyongō) is a national highway located entirely within Wakayama Prefecture, Japan. It connects the cities of Tanabe and Kinokawa, spanning the western side of the prefecture in a south–north routing. The highway has a total length of 113.0 kilometers (70.2 mi).

== Route description ==
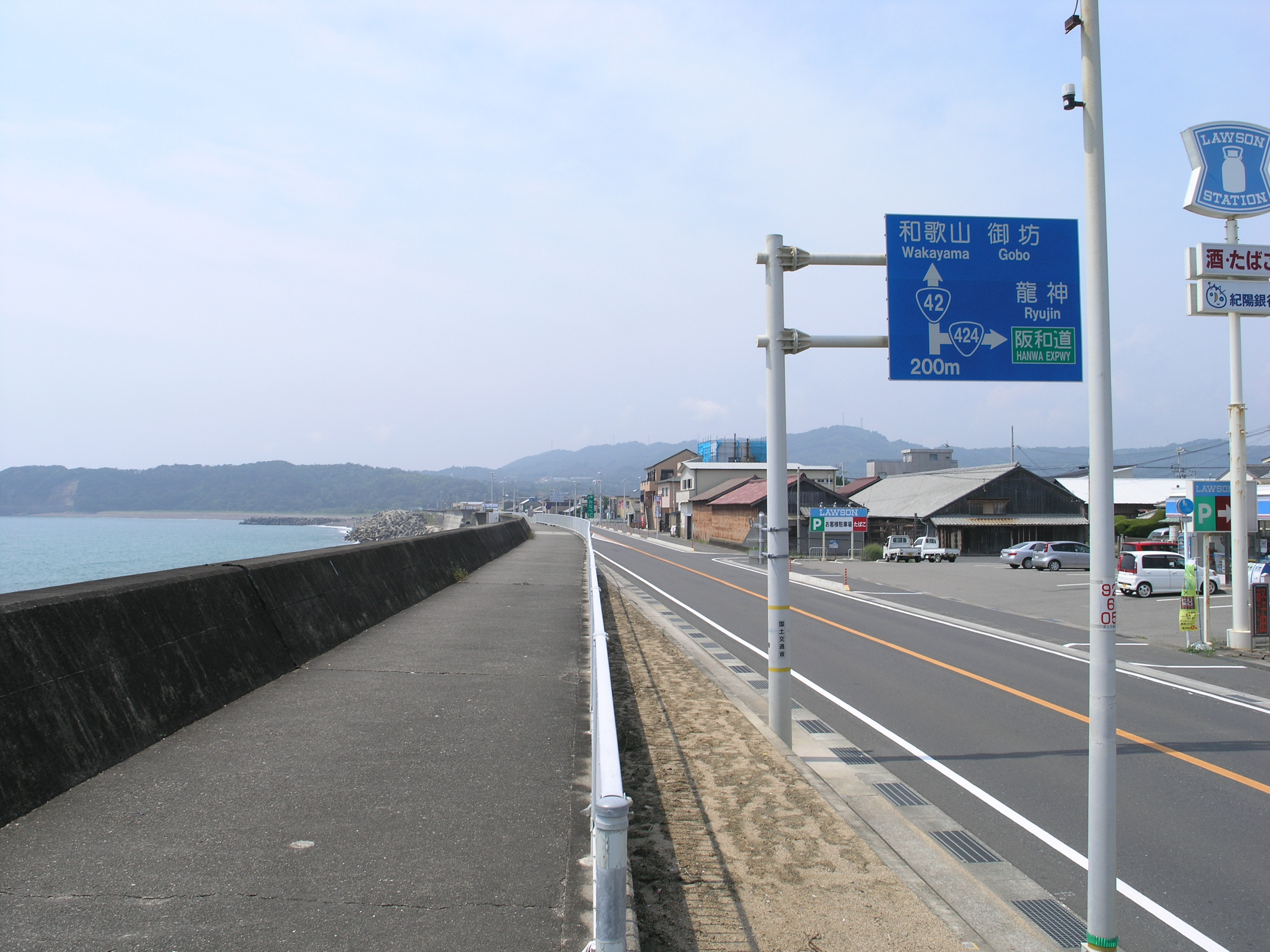
The northern end of National Route 424's concurrency with National Route 42 in Minabe.

National Route 424 is a national highway that does not leave Wakayama Prefecture. The highway connects the cities of Tanabe and Kinokawa, running south–north across the prefecture. The highway almost entirely runs through the prefecture's inland mountainous area, paralleling the coastal routing of National Route 42 and the Hanwa Expressway; however, the southernmost section of the highway between Minabe and Tanabe runs along the prefecture's west coast. The highway has a total length of 113.0 kilometers (70.2 mi), excluding its auxiliary routes.

== History ==
On 1 April 1982, National Route 424 was established by the Cabinet of Japan between the city of Tanabe and the former town of Uchita which has since been merged into the city of Kinokawa. In 1996 a project began to widen and straighten a winding one-lane section of the road along the Shuri River in Aridagawa. The realignment project was completed on 11 July 2012 with a total cost of 8.9 billion yen. Another project began in 2010 in Minabe to straighten and shorten the highway. The project was significantly delayed by landslides caused by Tropical Storm Talas on 5 September 2011. On 2 October 2017, the project was completed, shortening the total length of the highway by about a kilometer and a half.

== Major intersections ==
The route lies entirely within Wakayama Prefecture.

Location	km	mi	Destinations	Notes
Tanabe	0.0	0.0	Wakayama Prefecture Route 31 – Shingu, Shirahama, central Tanabe	Southern terminus
Tanabe	1.0	0.62	Wakayama Prefecture Route 207 – Nagano	
Tanabe	1.2	0.75	Wakayama Prefecture Route 29 – Ryūjin	
Tanabe	2.0	1.2	National Route 42 east – to Kisei Expressway east, Hanwa Expressway north Wakayama Prefecture Route 208 – Central Tanabe	Southern end of National Route 42 concurrency
Tanabe	3.6	2.2	Wakayama Prefecture Route 210 east – Central Tanabe	
Tanabe	5.4	3.4	Wakayama Prefecture Route 199 north – to Kisei Expressway east, Hanwa Expressway north, Wakayama, Shirahama	
Minabe	9.9	6.2	Wakayama Prefecture Route 200 north	
Minabe	10.2	6.3	Wakayama Prefecture Route 201 east – Minabe Station	
Minabe	10.7	6.6	National Route 42 west – Wakayama, Gobō	Northern end of National Route 42 concurrency
Minabe	12.3	7.6	Hanwa Expressway – Shirahama, Osaka	Minabe Interchange (E42 exit 33)
Minabe	15.5	9.6	Wakayama Prefecture Route 30 west – Inami	Southern end of Wakayama Prefecture Route 30 concurrency
Minabe	16.6	10.3	Wakayama Prefecture Route 30 east – Haya, Akitsugawa	Northern end of Wakayama Prefecture Route 30 concurrency
Minabe	20.5	12.7	Wakayama Prefecture Route 197 west – Furui	
Minabe	26.3	16.3	Wakayama Prefecture Route 199 south – Tanabe	
Tanabe	35.0	21.7	National Route 425 east – Shingū, Nakahechi	Southern end of National Route 425 concurrency
Tanabe	40.7	25.3	National Route 425 west / Wakayama Prefecture Route 29 south – Inami	Northern end of National Route 425 concurrency, southern end of Wakayama Prefecture Route 29 concurrency
Tanabe	44.6	27.7	Wakayama Prefecture Route 29 north	Northern end of Wakayama Prefecture Route 29 concurrency
Hidakagawa	59.1	36.7	Wakayama Prefecture Route 26 west – to National Route 42, Gobō; Wakayama Prefecture Route 194 east – Kamiubuyugawa	
Aridagawa	75.1	46.7	Wakayama Prefecture Route 179 west	
Aridagawa	77.1	47.9	Old National Route 424 north – Kainan; Wakayama Prefecture Route 22 west – to Hanwa Expressway, National Route 42, Arida, Yuasa	
Aridagawa	77.7	48.3	National Route 480 – Arida, Kōya, Shimizu	
Aridagawa	78.9	49.0	Wakayama Prefecture Route 18 north – to National Route 42, Arida	
Aridagawa	79.1	49.2	Wakayama Prefecture Route 182 east	
Aridagawa	81.1	50.4	Wakayama Prefecture Route 183 east – Ohara	
Aridagawa	86.8	53.9	Wakayama Prefecture Route 184 east – Oishi Highland	
Kainan	95.8	59.5	Wakayama Prefecture Route 169 east – Kōya, Kimino	
Kainan	96.0	59.7	National Route 370 west / National Route 424 north (Sakai Bypass) – to National Route 42, central Kainan	Southern end of National Route 370 concurrency
Kainan	96.7	60.1	National Route 370 east (Nishi Kōya Kaidō) – Kōya	Northern end of National Route 370 concurrency
Kainan	97.6	60.6	Wakayama Prefecture Route 138 – Kuroiwa, Kimino	
Kainan	102.1	63.4	Wakayama Prefecture Route 10 south – Kōya, Nokami Industrial Site	Southern end of Wakayama Prefecture Route 10 concurrency
Kinokawa	102.5	63.7	Wakayama Prefecture Route 10 north – Wakayama, Iwade	Northern end of Wakayama Prefecture Route 10 concurrency
Kinokawa	102.9	63.9	Wakayama Prefecture Route 129 east – Kaito	
Kinokawa	104.6	65.0	Wakayama Prefecture Route 13 west – Wakayama	Southern end of Wakayama Prefecture Route 13 concurrency
Kinokawa	108.7	67.5	Wakayama Prefecture Route 128 north – to Keinawa Expressway, National Route 24; Wakayama Prefecture Route 130 west – Iwade	
Kinokawa	109.4	68.0	Wakayama Prefecture Route 3 east – Kōya, Tomobuchi	
Kinokawa	111.3	69.2	Wakayama Prefecture Route 13 east – Hashimoto, Katsuragi	Northern end of Wakayama Prefecture Route 13 concurrency
Kinokawa	112.6	70.0	Wakayama Prefecture Route 14 – Wakayama, Iwade, Nara, Hashimoto	
Kinokawa	113.0	70.2	National Route 24 – Wakayama, Nara, Iwade, Hashimoto; Wakayama Prefecture Route 62 north – to Keinawa Expressway, Izumisano, Kindai University	Northern terminus, road continues north as Wakayama Prefecture Route 62
1.000 mi = 1.609 km; 1.000 km = 0.621 mi: Concurrency terminus; Route transition
