= Japan National Route 42 =

National Route 42
- 国道42号

Route information
- Length: 504.6 km (313.5 mi)
- Existed: 1 April 1959–present

Major junctions
- East end: National Route 1 in Hamamatsu
- West end: National Route 24 in Wakayama

Location
- Country: Japan

Highway system
- National highways of Japan; Expressways of Japan
← National Route 41	→ National Route 43

National Route 42 (国道42号, Kokudō yonjūni-gō), also called Kumano Kaidō or Tropical Route is a national highway connecting Hamamatsu, Shizuoka and Wakayama, Wakayama in Japan. Part of the route requires crossing Ise Bay on the Ise-wan Ferry. It is the 8th longest national highway in Japan.

== Route data ==
The total length on the main road is 487.2km(307.2 miles). However, by factoring in the overlapped section (33.4 km/20.8 miles) and the sea crossing(19.8 km/12.3 miles)the total distance becomes 540.3 km(335.7miles). At the origin Hamamatsu, the route starts overlapped with Route 1 and, is a junction with route 257 and 300. The route passes through the cities of Tahara, Toba, Ise, Matsusaka, Owase, Kumano, Shingū, Tanabe, and Gobō. At the terminus Wakayama, there is a junction with national route 24 and 26.

=== Overlapping sections ===
- From the origin to Kosai: Route 1
- From Tahara to Toba (Ferry crossing section): Route 259
- From Toba to Ise: Route 167
- From Ise to Matsusaka : Route 23
- From Tanabe to Minabe: Route 424

== History ==
Route 42 was originally designated in January 1945 as a section of Route 41 (the Kumano Highway), which ran to Tokyo. This ran concurrent with Route 1 (now Route 1/Route 23). On 18 May 1953 Route 41 was classified as a Class 2 highway and redesignated as Route 170, which was later redesignated as Route 42 when the route was promoted to a Class 1 highway. On 1 April 1965, the classification of Class 1 and Class 2 was discontinued, redesignating it as General National Route 42.

On 1 April 1993, the highway was changed by removing the section of Tsu-Matsusaka and adding the Hamamatsu - Matsusaka. This was part of the plan to connect the Atsumi Peninsula, though the Kii Peninsula, Shikoku, Kyushu and terminating at Okinawa. This plan is called the Japan Sea National Land Axis Plan.

== Passes through ==
Shizuoka Prefecture

- Hamana Bypass (浜名バイパス)
  - Hamamatsu - Kosai

Aichi Prefecture

- Sanen Ise Access Road (三遠伊勢連絡道路) - Planning Stage
  - Hamamatsu - Ise (Mie Prefecture)

Mie Prefecture

- Matsusaka - Taki Bypass (松阪多気バイパス)
  - Matsusaka - Taki
- Kumano - Owase Road (熊野尾鷲道路)
  - Owase - Kumano
- Odomari Bypass (大泊バイパス)
  - Kumano
- Kumano Road (熊野道路)
  - Kumanoo
- Kiho Bypass (紀宝バイパス)
  - Kiho - Shingu
- Shingu - Kiho Road (新宮紀宝道路)
  - Kiho - Shingu

Wakayama Prefecture

- Nachikatsuura - Shingu Road (那智勝浦新宮道路)
  - Shingu - Nachikatsuura
- Kushimoto - Taiji Road (串本太地道路)
  - Taiji - Kushimoto
- Susami - Kushimoto Road (すさみ串本道路)
  - Kushimoto - Susami
- Yuasa - Gobo Road (湯浅御坊道路) - Toll Road
  - Gobo - Yuasa
- Hiki River Road (日置川道路)
  - Sasumi - Shirahama
- Tanabe Bypass (田辺バイパス)
  - Kamitonda - Tanabe
- West Tanabe Bypass (田辺西バイパス)
  - Tanabe
- Yura Bypass (由良バイパス)
  - Yura - Hirogawa
- Arida Bypass (有田バイパス)
  - Arida
- Shimizu Widening (冷水拡幅) - Partially Under Construction
  - Kainan
- Arita - Kainan Road (有田海南道路) - Partially Under Construction
  - Arida - Kainan
- Kainan Bypass (海南バイパス)
  - Kainan

== Intersects with ==
Prefecture	Location	km	mi	Destinations	Notes
Shizuoka	Hamamatsu			National Route 257 / National Route 301 – Takayama, Toyota; National Route 1 – Osaka, Tokyo	Overlapping section of National Route 1
Shizuoka	Kosai			National Route 257 / National Route 301 – Takayama, Toyota; National Route 1 – Osaka, Tokyo	End of overlapping section of National Route 1
Aichi	Tahara			Aichi Prefectural Route 28 – Takahara	
Aichi	Tahara			Aichi Prefectural Route 2 – Toyohashi	
Aichi	Tahara			National Route 259 – Toba, Toyohashi	Overlapping section with National Route 259
Ise Wan	Tahara - Toba			Ise Wan Ferry	
Mie	Toba			National Route 167 – Shima, Ise	Overlapping section with National Route 167
Mie	Toba			National Route 167 – Shima, Ise	End of overlapping section for National Route 167
Mie	Ise			Ise-Futami-toba Line - Ise	
Mie	Ise			National Route 23 – Toyohashi, Ise	
Mie	Meiwa			Mie Prefectural Route 60 – Ise, Matsusaka	
Mie	Matsusaka			Mie Prefectural Route 59 – Matsusaka	
Mie	Matsusaka			National Route 23 – Ise, Toyohashi	End of overlapping section with National Route 23
Mie	Matsusaka			Mie Prefectural Route 60 – Ise, Matsusaka	On the Matsusaka - Taki Bypass
Mie	Matsusaka			Mie Prefectural Route 37 – Toba, Matsusaka	On the Matsusaka - Taki Bypass
Mie	Matsusaka			Mie Prefectural Route 59 – Matsusaka	On the Matsusaka - Taki Bypass
Mie	Matsusaka			Mie Prefectural Route 59 – Matsusaka	On the Matsusaka - Taki Bypass
Mie	Matsusaka			Mie Prefectural Route 59 – Matsusaka	
Mie	Matsusaka			Mie Prefectural Route 59 – Matsusaka	
Mie	Taki			Mie Prefectural Route 13 – Ise, Taki	
Mie	Taki			Ise Expressway - Ise, Tsu; Kisei Expressway - Taki, Owase	Seiwa-Taki Interchange
Mie	Taki			National Route 368 – Iga, Taki	
Mie	Odai			Mie Prefectural Route 46 – Minamiise, Odai	
Mie	Odai			Mie Prefectural Route 31 – Odai	
Mie	Odai			Kisei Expressway - Taki, Owase	Omiya - Odai Interchange
Mie	Taiki			Mie Prefectural Route 38 – Taiki, Ise	
Mie	Taiki			Mie Prefectural Route 33 – Taiki, Ise	
Mie	Taiki			Mie Prefectural Route 68– Taiki	Connecting to Kisei Expressway - Taki, Owase
Mie	Kihoku			National Route 260 – Kihoku, Shima	
Mie	Kihoku			National Route 422 – Otsu, Kihoku	
Mie	Kihoku			National Route 422 – Otsu, Kihoku	
Mie	Kihoku			Kisei Expressway - Taki, Owase	Miyama Interchange
Mie	Owase			National Route 425 – Owase, Gobo	
Mie	Owase			National Route 311 – Owase, Kamitonda	
Mie	Owase			Mie Prefectural Route 70 – Owase	
Mie	Owase			Mie Prefectural Route 70 – Owase	On the Kumano Owase Road (Bypass)
Mie	Kumano			National Route 309 – Osaka, Kumano	
Mie	Kumano			National Route 311 – Owase, Kamitonda	Overlapping section with National Route 311
Mie	Kumano			Mie Prefectural Route 34 – Kumano	
Mie	Kumano			National Route 311 – Owase, Kamitonda	End of overlapping section of National Route 311
Mie	Mihama			Mie, Wakayama Prefectural Route 52 – Mihama, Kitayama	
Mie	Mihama			Mie Prefectural Route 62 – Mihama, Kumano	
Mie	Kiho			Mie Prefectural Route 35 – KIho, Mihama	On Kiho Bypass
Wakayama	Shingu			Wakayama Prefectural Route 42 – Shingu	
Wakayama	Shingu			National Route 168 – Shingu, Hirakata	
Wakayama	Nachikatsuura			Wakayama Prefectural Route 43 – Nachikatsuura, Kozagawa	
Wakayama	Nachikatsuura			Wakayama Prefectural Route 46 – Nachikatsuura	Entrance of Bypass road
Wakayama	Nachikatsuura			Wakayama Prefectural Route 46 – Nachikatsuura	
Wakayama	Nachikatsuura			Wakayama Prefectural Route 46 – Nachikatsuura	
Wakayama	Nachikatsuura			Wakayama Prefectural Route 45 – Nachikatsuura, Tanabe	
Wakayama	Kushimoto			Wakayama Prefectural Route 38 – Kushimoto, Susami	
Wakayama	Kushimoto			Wakayama Prefectural Route 41 – Kushimoto	
Wakayama	Kushimoto			Wakayama Prefectural Route 41 – Kushimoto	
Wakayama	Kushimoto			National Route 371 – Kushimoto, Kawachinagano	
Wakayama	Kushimoto			Wakayama Prefectural Route 39 – Kushimoto, Kozagawa	
Wakayama	Susami			Wakayama Prefectural Route 36 – Susami, Kamitonda	
Wakayama	Susami			Wakayama Prefectural Route 38 – Kushimoto, Susami	
Wakayama	Shirahama			Wakayama Prefectural Route 37 – Shirahama, Tanabe	
Wakayama	Shirahama			Wakayama Prefectural Route 34 – Shirahama	
Wakayama	Kamitonda			Wakayama Prefectural Route 31 – Shirahama, Tanabe	
Wakayama	Kamitonda			National Route 311 – Owase, Kamitonda	
Wakayama	Tanabe			Wakayama Prefectural Route 33 – Tanabe; Wakayama Prefectural Route 31 – Shirahama, Tanabe	To Nanki-Shirahama Airport
Wakayama	Tanabe			Wakayama Prefectural Route 29 – Tanabe	
Wakayama	Tanabe			Wakayama Prefectural Route 208 – Tanabe	
Wakayama	Tanabe			Hanwa Expressway; Kisei Expressway	Nanki Tanabe Interchange
Wakayama	Tanabe			National Route 424 – Tanabe, Kinokawa	Overlapping section with National Route 424
Wakayama	Minabe			National Route 424 – Tanabe, Kinokawa	End of overlapping section with National Route 424
Wakayama	Inami			Wakayama Prefectural Route 28 – Inami	
Wakayama	Gobo			National Route 425 – Owase, Gobo	
Wakayama	Gobo			Wakayama Prefectural Route 25 – Gobo, Hidakagawa	
Wakayama	Gobo			Wakayama Prefectural Route 26 – Gobo, Hidakagawa	
Wakayama	Gobo			Wakayama Prefectural Route 24 – Gobo, Hidakagawa	
Wakayama	Hidaka			Wakayama Prefectural Route 27 – Hidaka, Inami	
Wakayama	Hidaka			Wakayama Prefectural Route 23 – Hidaka, Yuasa	
Wakayama	Yura			Wakayama Prefectural Route 23 – Hidaka, Yuasa	
Wakayama	Yura			Wakayama Prefectural Route 23 – Hidaka, Yuasa	
Wakayama	Hirogawa			Wakayama Prefectural Route 27 – Hidaka, Inami	
Wakayama	Hirogawa			Hanwa Expressway	Hirokawa Interchange
Wakayama	Yuasa			Wakayama Prefectural Route 23 – Hidaka, Yuasa	
Wakayama	Aridagawa			Hanwa Expressway	Arida Interchange
Wakayama	Aridagawa			Wakayama Prefectural Route 22 – Aridagawa	
Wakayama	Arida			Wakayama Prefectural Route 20 – Arida, Yuasa	
Wakayama	Arida			Wakayama Prefectural Route 20 – Arida, Yuasa	
Wakayama	Arida			National Route 480 – Arida, Izumiotsu	
Wakayama	Kainan			Hanwa Expressway	Kainan Interchange
Wakayama	Kainan			National Route 370 – Kainan, Nara	
Wakayama	Kainan			Wakayama Prefectural Route 9 – Kainan, Iwade	
Wakayama	Wakayama			Wakayama Prefectural Route 13 – Wakayama, Hashimoto	
Wakayama	Wakayama			National Route 26 – Wakayama, Osaka; National Route 24 – Wakayama, Kyoto	
1.000 mi = 1.609 km; 1.000 km = 0.621 mi: Concurrency terminus; Incomplete access; Route transition
