= Keinawa Expressway =

Road in Kyōto Prefecture, Nara Prefecture and Wakayama Prefecture in Japan

Keinawa Expressway
- 京奈和自動車道 (Keinawa jidōsha-dō)

Route information
- Length: 104.9 km (65.2 mi)
- Existed: 1988–present
- Component highways: National Route 24

Major junctions
- North end: National Route 24 at Joyo Interchange in Jōyō
- Shin-Meishin Expressway in Jōyō; National Route 307 in Kyōtanabe; National Route 163 in Kizugawa; Nishi-Meihan Expressway in Yamatokōriyama; National Route 24 / National Route 165 in Kashihara; National Route 309 in Gose; National Route 310 in Gojō; National Route 371 in Hashimoto; National Route 480 in Katsuragi

Section 1
- South end: Hanwa Expressway at Wakayama Junction in Wakayama, Wakayama

Location
- Country: Japan

Highway system
- National highways of Japan; Expressways of Japan

The Keinawa Expressway (京奈和自動車道, Keinawa jidōsha-dō) is a 104.9-kilometre-long (65.2 mi) north–south (physically northeast–southwest) National Highway with access control (一般国道自動車専用道路 Ippan-kokudō jidōsha-sen-yō-dōro) in the Kinki region of Japan that connects Kyoto Prefecture to Wakayama Prefecture via Nara Prefecture. It is numbered "E24" under Ministry of Land, Infrastructure, Transport and Tourism's "Expressway Numbering Systemg."

== Route description ==
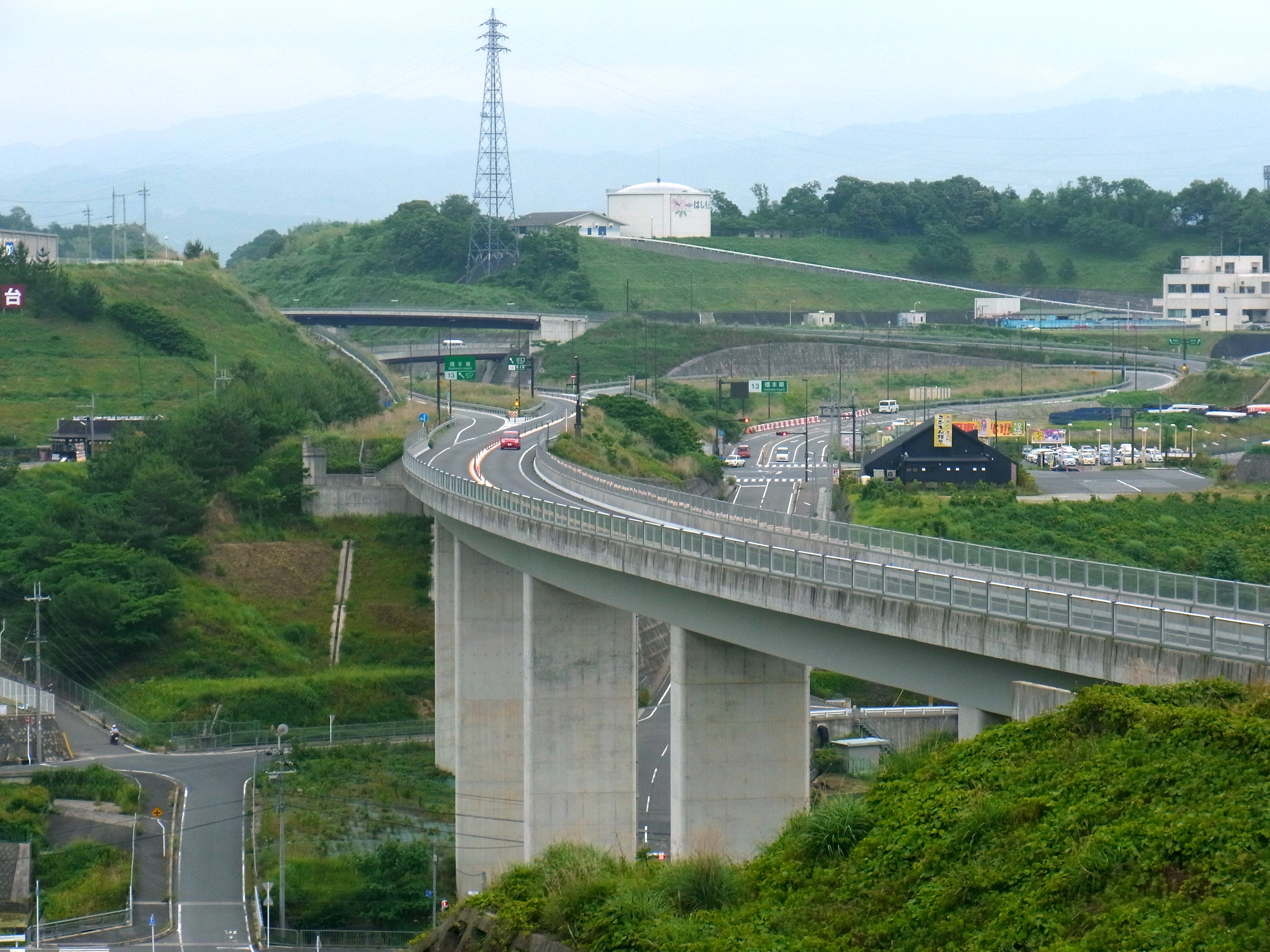
The Keinawa Expressway at Hashimoto-higashi IC in Hashimoto, Wakayama

The Keinawa Expressway generally follows the path of Japan National Route 24 from Kyoto to Wakayama. It begins at an interchange with the Shin-Meishin Expressway near Kyoto City. From Kyoto the expressway travels south through Kansai Science City and Nara Prefecture, then crosses into Wakayama where it runs along the southern side of the Kisen Alps while travelling southwest towards Wakayama where it comes to an end at a junction with the Hanwa Expressway. There are some gaps in the expressway that are linked by the previously named national highway. The purpose of this route is to serve as a high-speed route from Kyoto to Wakayama, bypassing Osaka to the west.

== Naming ==
The name Keinawa is a Sino-Japanese pronunciation of a three-character kanji acronym for Kyoto, Nara, and Wakayama (京奈和) that are the names of the three prefectures in the Kinki region that the Keinawa Expressway links. The first character of the three-character kanji that represents Kyoto (京都) is pronounced as kei, whereas the second character of the kanji that represents Nara (奈良) and the third character of it represents Wakayama (和歌山) are pronounced as na and wa respectively.

== History ==
The highway was first proposed in 1973 as bypasses in the Kinki region that were not connected. The first section of the expressway connecting Jōyō, Kyoto and Kyotanabe, Kyoto was opened in 1988. The most recent section to open as of May 2018 was between the southern terminus with the Hanwa Expressway and Iwade-Negoro in Wakayama.

== Interchange list ==
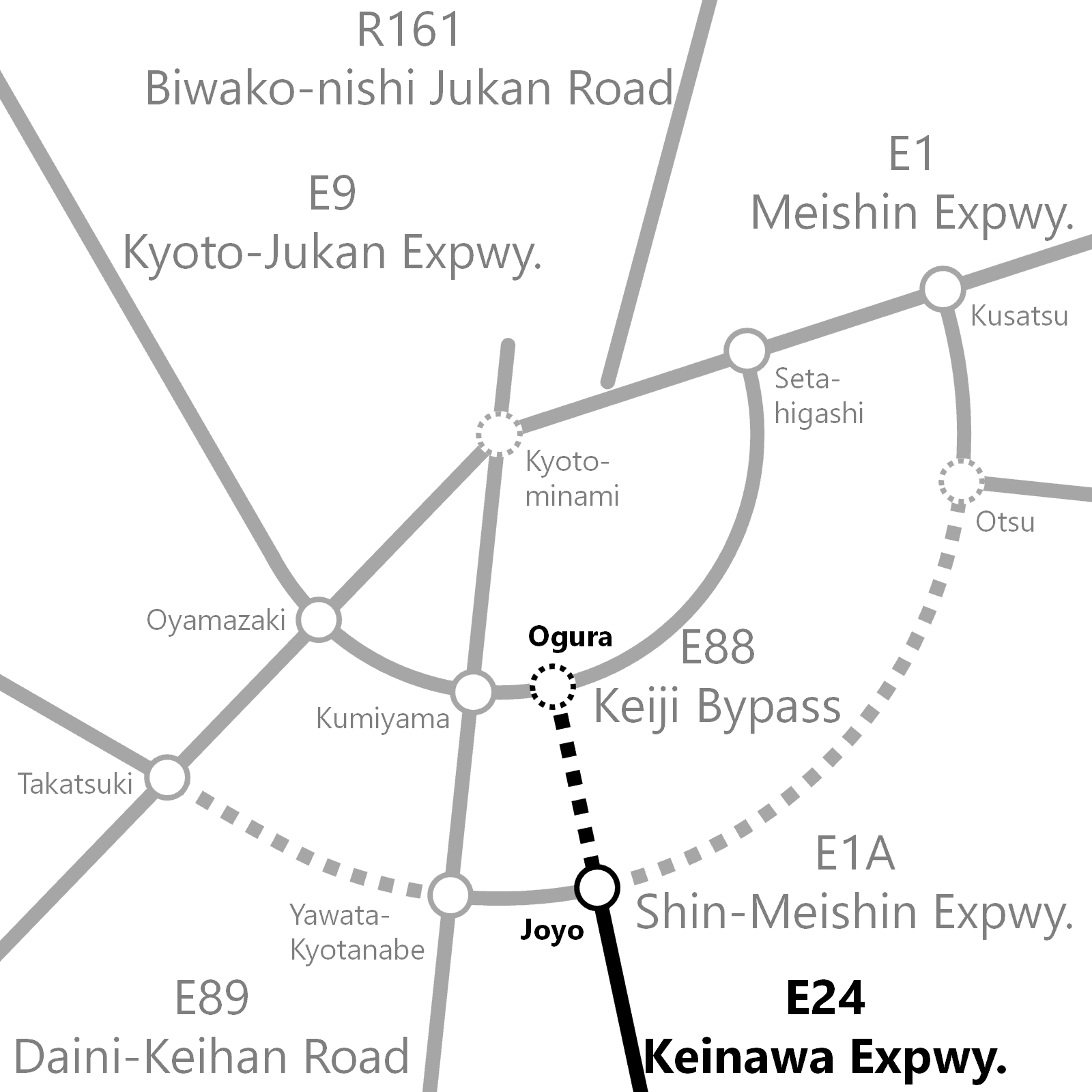
Map of Keinawa Expressway around Kyoto and the other expressways. Roads and junctions under planning are shown by dotted lines.

Prefecture	Location	km	mi	Exit	Name	Destinations	Notes
Kyoto	Jōyō	0	0.0	9	Joyo	National Route 24 – Kyoto, Nara	Northern terminus; northern terminus of Keina Road
Kyoto	Jōyō			9	Joyo Junction	Shin-Meishin Expressway – Kadoma, Kyoto City	
Kyoto	Kyōtanabe	1.6	0.99	2	Tanabe-kita	Tanabe-kita, Yawata	Toll outbound (southbound) exit and inbound (northbound) entrance
Kyoto	Kyōtanabe			Tanabe-nishi Toll Gate (inbound (northbound))			
Kyoto	Kyōtanabe	5.1	3.2	3	Tanabe-nishi	National Route 307 – Tanabe-nishi, Hirakata	Toll exits and outbound (southbound) entrance
Kyoto	Seika	9.0	5.6	4	Seika-Shimokoma	Seika-Shimokoma	Toll exits and inbound (northbound) entrance
Kyoto	Seika			Seika-Shimokoma Toll Gate (outbound (southbound))			
Kyoto	Kizugawa	12.4	7.7	5	Seika-Gakken	Seika-Gakken	Toll inbound (northbound) exit and outbound (southbound) entrance
Kyoto	Seika	14.0	8.7	6	Yamadagawa	National Route 163 – Yamadagawa	
Kyoto	Kizugawa	17.0	10.6	7	Kizu	National Route 24 – Kizu, Nara	Toll outbound (southbound) exit and inbound (northbound) entrance; southern terminus of Keina Road
Nara	Nara			–	Nara-kita		Inbound (northbound) exit and outbound (southbound) entrance; northern terminus of Yamato-kita Road (under construction)
Nara	Nara	6.1 km gap in the expressway, connection is made by National Route 24					
Nara	Nara	23.1	14.4	–	Nara		
Nara	Nara	2.0 km gap in the expressway, connection is made by National Route 24					
Nara	Yamatokōriyama	25.1	15.6	–	Yamatokoriyama-kita		
Nara	Yamatokōriyama	3.7 km gap in the expressway, connection is made by National Route 24					
Nara	Yamatokōriyama	28.8	17.9	–	Yamatokoriyama		Outbound (southbound) exit and inbound (northbound) entrance
Nara	Yamatokōriyama	0.6 km gap in the expressway, connection is made by National Route 24					
Nara	Yamatokōriyama	29.4	18.3	4-2	Koriyama-shimotsumichi Junction	Nishi-Meihan Expressway – Osaka, Nagoya	Toll westbound exit and southbound entrance from eastbound only; southern terminus of Yamato-kita Road (under construction); northern terminus of Yamato-Gojo Road
Nara	Tenri	31.0	19.3	8	Koriyama-minami	National Route 24 – Koriyama-minami, Nara	Inbound (northbound) exit and outbound (southbound) entrance; traffic continuing to the Kyoto portion (Keina Road) of the Keinawa Expressway must exit here
Nara	Miyake	33.3	20.7	–	Miyake	Miyake, Tawaramoto	Outbound (southbound) exit and inbound (northbound) entrance
Nara	Tawaramoto	36.8	22.9	–	Tawaramoto	奈良県道14号標識 National Route 24 to Nara Prefecture Route 14 – Tawaramoto	Inbound (northbound) exit and outbound (southbound) entrance
Nara	Kashihara	38.8	24.1	9	Kashihara-kita	National Route 24 – Kashihara-kita, Yamatotakada	Outbound (southbound) exit and inbound (northbound) entrance
Nara	Kashihara	4.4 km gap in the expressway, connection is made by National Route 24					
Nara	Kashihara	43.2	26.8	–	Kashihara-Takada	National Route 24 / National Route 165 (Yamato-Takada Bypass) – Kashihara, Yamatotakada	Inbound (northbound) exit and outbound (southbound) entrance
Nara	Kashihara	46.9	29.1	–	Gose	National Route 24 – Gose, Takatori	
Nara	Gose	49.4	30.7	–	Gose-minami	National Route 24 / National Route 309 – Gose-minami, Oyodo	Outbound (southbound) exit and inbound (northbound) entrance
Nara	Gose			Gose-minami Parking Area as Gosenosato Rest Area (inbound (northbound))			
Nara	Gose			Koseyama Tunnel			
Nara	Gose			Asamachi Tunnel			
Nara	Gose			Kamokimi Tunnel			
Nara	Gojō	56.6	35.2	10	Gojo-kita	National Route 24 – Gojo-kita, Oyodo	Southern terminus of Yamato-Gojo Road; northern terminus of Gojo Road
Nara	Gojō	61.1	38.0	11	Gojo	National Route 310 to National Route 168 – Gojo, Totsukawa, Kawachinagano	
Nara	Gojō			Kamanokubo-higashi Tunnel			
Nara	Gojō	63.2	39.3	12	Gojo-nishi	National Route 24 – Gojo-nishi	Outbound (southbound) exit and inbound (northbound) entrance; southern terminus of Gojo Road; northern terminus of Hashimoto Road
Nara	Gojō			Hatakeda Tunnel			
Wakayama	Hashimoto	65.3	40.6	13	Hashimoto-higashi	National Route 24 – Hashimoto-higashi	
Wakayama	Hashimoto	70.2	43.6	14	Hashimoto	National Route 371 to National Route 24 – Hashimoto, Koya	
Wakayama	Hashimoto	75.8	47.1	15	Koyaguchi	National Route 24 – Koyaguchi, Kudoyama	Southern terminus of Hashimoto Road; northern terminus of Kihoku-higashi Road
Wakayama	Katsuragi	79.8	49.6	16	Kihoku-Katsuragi	National Route 24 – Kihoku-Katsuragi, Koya	
Wakayama	Katsuragi			Parking Area as Michi-no-eki Katsuragi-nishi Rest Area			
Wakayama	Katsuragi	81.8	50.8	17	Katsuragi-nishi	Katsuragi-nishi	
Wakayama	Kinokawa	88.2	54.8	18	Kinokawa-higashi	National Route 24 – Kinokawa-higashi	
Wakayama	Kinokawa	92.7	57.6	19	Kinokawa	National Route 24 – Kinokawa	Southern terminus of Kihoku-higashi Road; northern terminus of Kihoku-nishi Road
Wakayama	Kinokawa			Shirutani Tunnel			
Wakayama	Kinokawa			Kasugayamajo Castle Tunnel			
Wakayama	Kinokawa			Negoro Tunnel			
Wakayama	Iwade	98.4	61.1	20	Iwade-Negoro	National Route 24 – Iwade, Negoro	
Wakayama	Iwade			Iwade-Negoro Toll Gate (northern terminus of ticketed system)			
Wakayama	Iwade			Iwade Tunnel			
Wakayama	Wakayama	101.6– 104.9	63.1– 65.2	20-1	Wakayama Junction	Hanwa Expressway – Hannan, Osaka, Wakayama, Shirahama;	Southern terminus; southern terminus of Kihoku-nishi Road
1.000 mi = 1.609 km; 1.000 km = 0.621 mi: Incomplete access; Tolled; Unopened

== See also ==
- Transport in Keihanshin
- West Nippon Expressway Company
