= E42 =

E42, E-42 or E.42 may refer to:

- European route E42, a road connecting France, Belgium and Germany
- Esposizione Universale Roma, a business district in Rome, Italy
- HMS E42, a United Kingdom Royal Navy E class submarine which saw service during World War I
- Nimzo-Indian Defense, Encyclopaedia of Chess Openings code
- EUR, Rome
- Hanwa Expressway (between Wakayama JCT and Nanki-Tanabe IC), Kisei Expressway, Nachikatsuura-Shingū Road and Kumano-Owase Road, route E42 in Japan
