= Iwashiro =

Iwashiro may refer to:

- Iwashiro Province, a former province of Japan
- Iwashiro, Fukushima, a former town in Adachi District, Fukushima Prefecture, Japan
- Iwashiro Station, a railway station in Wakayama Prefecture, Japan

== People with the surname ==
- Taro Iwashiro (岩代 太郎, born 1965), Japanese composer
- Toshiaki Iwashiro (岩代 俊明, born 1977), Japanese manga artist
