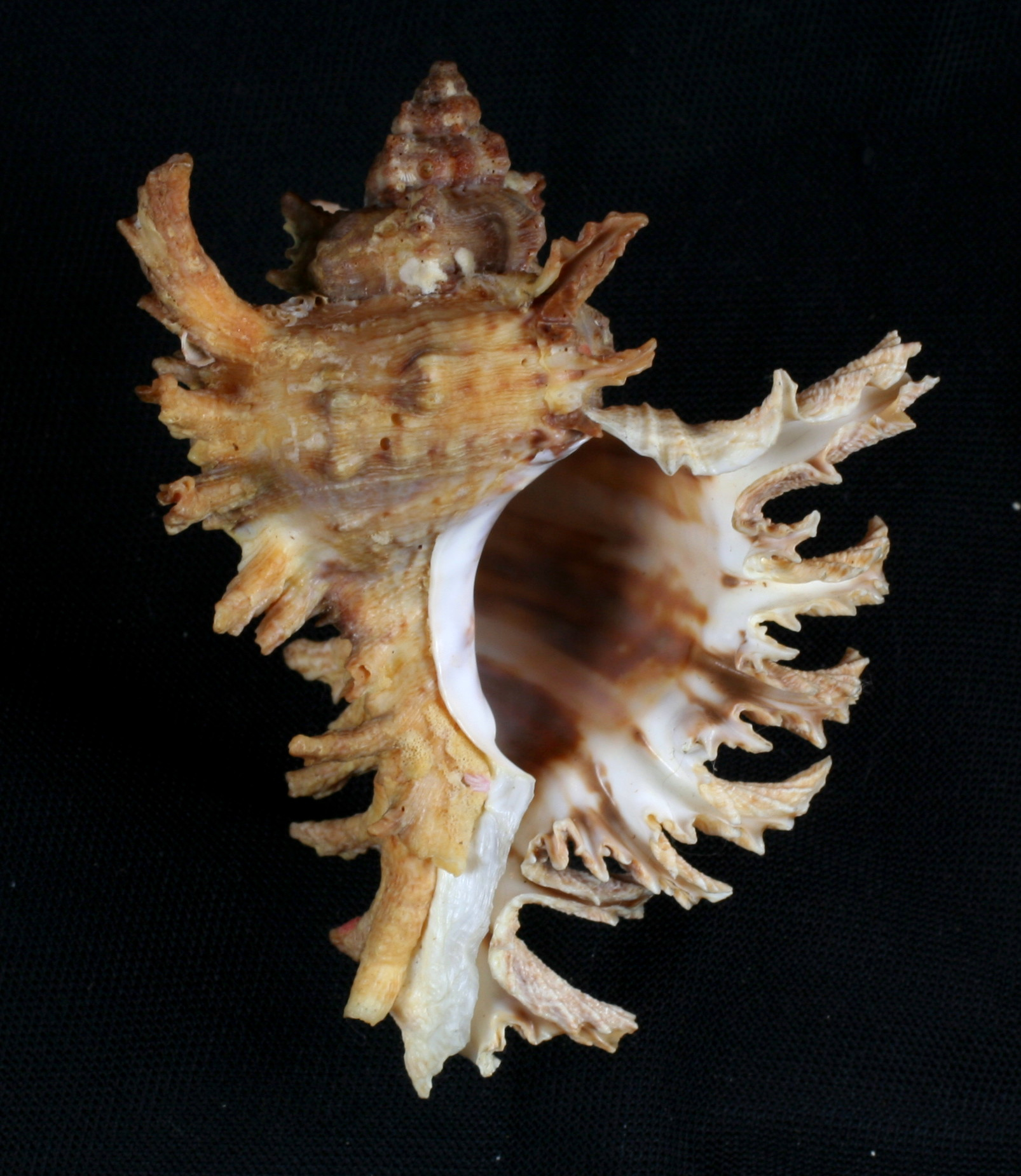
- Shell of Chicoreus asianus Kuroda, 1842, measuring 82.4 mm in height, taken by gill nets at 20 fathoms on rocks off Minabe, in Japan.

Scientific classification
- Kingdom: Animalia
- Phylum: Mollusca
- Class: Gastropoda
- Subclass: Caenogastropoda
- Order: Neogastropoda
- Family: Muricidae
- Genus: Chicoreus
- Species: C. asianus

Binomial name
- Chicoreus asianus Kuroda, 1942

Synonyms
- Chicoreus orientalis Zhang, 1965; Murex sinensis Reeve, 1845

= Chicoreus asianus =

Species of gastropod

The Asian murex (Chicoreus asianus) is a species of sea snail, a marine gastropod mollusk in the family Muricidae, the murex snails or rock snails.

== Description ==
Size 6–15 cm.

== Distribution ==
SE Japan - China - Vietnam.
