= Sakai Senboku Road =

Road in Osaka Prefecture, Japan

Sakai Senboku Road
- 堺泉北道路

Route information
- Maintained by West Nippon Expressway Company
- Length: 7.0 km (4.3 mi)
- Existed: 1991–present
- Component highways: National Route 26

Major junctions
- West end: Sukematsu Junction; Hanshin Expressway Route 4 in Izumiōtsu
- East end: Sakai Junction; Hanwa Expressway in Naka-ku, Sakai

Location
- Country: Japan

Highway system
- National highways of Japan; Expressways of Japan

The Sakai Senboku Road (堺泉北道路; Sakai Senboku Dōro) is a toll road in Osaka Prefecture. It is owned and operated by the West Nippon Expressway Company (NEXCO West Japan). The route is signed E90 under Ministry of Land, Infrastructure, Transport and Tourism's "2016 Proposal for Realization of Expressway Numbering."

== Route description ==
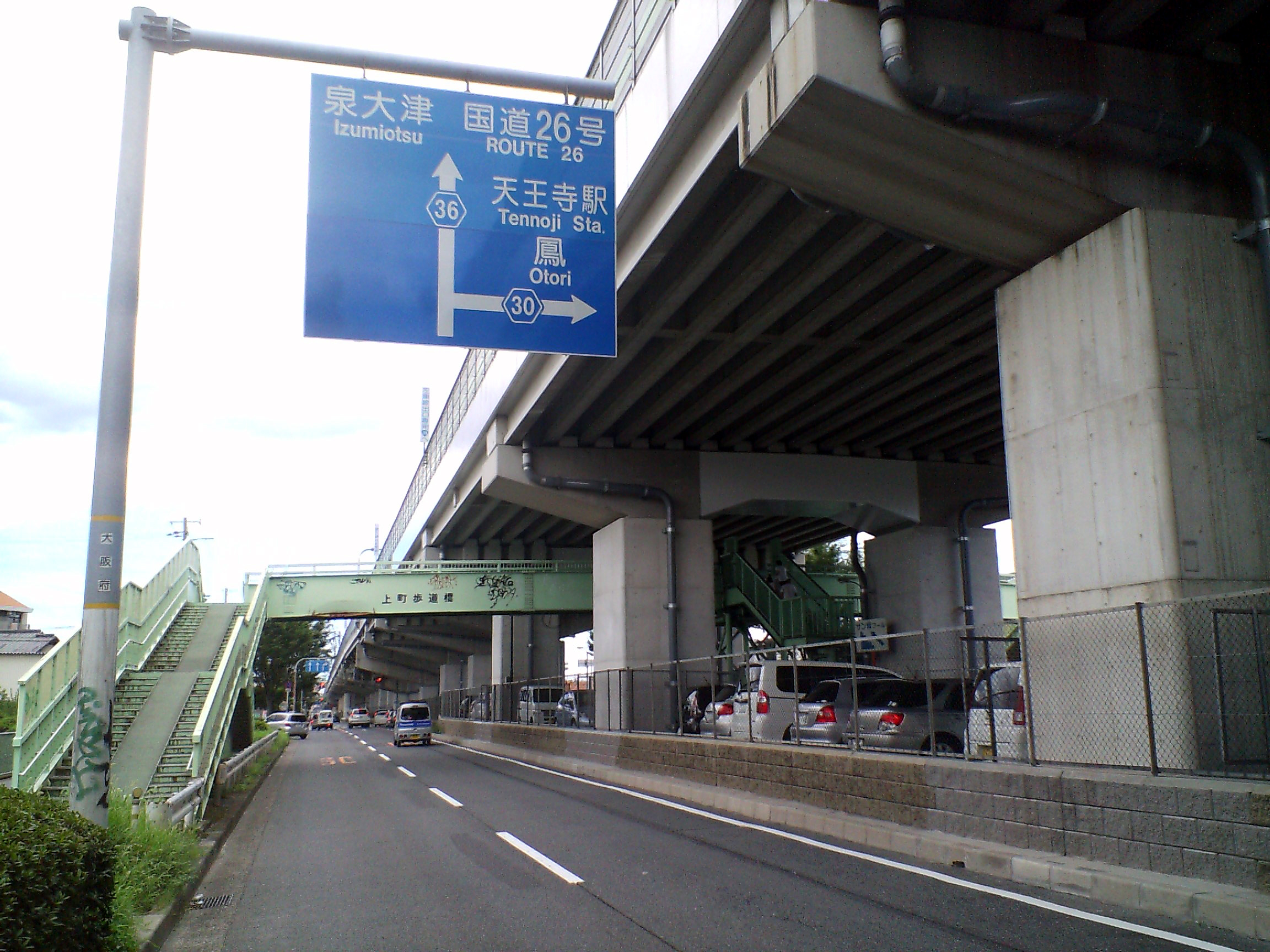
The Sakai Senboku Road around Izumi City with the Osaka Prefectural Route 36.

The road is a short connector route linking Hanshin Expressway Route 4 with the Hanwa Expressway.

Osaka Prefecture Route 36 serves as an access road to the toll road.

== History ==
After opening, the Sakai Senboku Road was managed by the Osaka Prefecture Road Corporation, but on 1 April 2018 the management of the road was transferred to the West Nippon Expressway Company.

== Junction list ==
The entire expressway is in Osaka Prefecture. TB - toll gate

Location	km	mi	Exit	Name	Destinations	Notes
Through to Hanshin Expressway Route 4
Izumiōtsu	0.0	0.0	4-11	Sukematsu	Hanshin Expressway Bayshore Route– Osaka, Kobe, Kansai International Airport, Izumisano	
Takaishi				Sukematsu	Osaka Prefecture Route 204 – Osaka, Hannan	Eastbound entrance, westbound exit
Takaishi	0.0	0.0		Ayazono	National Route 26 – Osaka, Sakai, Wakayama	Eastbound exit, westbound entrance
Takaishi			4	Toriishi	National Route 26	Eastbound entrance, westbound exit
Nishi-ku, Sakai			3	Hishiki	Osaka Prefecture Route 216	Eastbound entrance, westbound exit
Nishi-ku, Sakai			TB	Hishiki		Eastbound entrance, westbound exit
Nishi-ku, Sakai			2	Taiheiji	Osaka Prefecture Route 61 – Sakai, Katsuragi	Eastbound exit, westbound entrance
Naka-ku, Sakai	4.7	2.9	1	Hirai		Eastbound exit, westbound entrance
Naka-ku, Sakai			TB	Hirai		Eastbound exit, westbound entrance
Naka-ku, Sakai	7.0	4.3	14	Sakai	Hanwa Expressway – Osaka	Access to/from Osaka-bound traffic only
1.000 mi = 1.609 km; 1.000 km = 0.621 mi: Incomplete access
