= Hanwa Expressway =

National expressway in the Kinki region of Japan

Hanwa Expressway
- 阪和自動車道

Route information
- Length: 128.4 km (79.8 mi)
- Existed: 1974–present

Major junctions
- From: Matsubara Junction in Matsubara, Osaka; Kinki Expressway; Nishi-Meihan Expressway; Hanshin Expressway Route 14 Matsubara Route
- To: Nanki-Tanabe Interchange in Tanabe; Kisei Expressway

Location
- Country: Japan
- Major cities: Sakai, Wakayama

Highway system
- National highways of Japan; Expressways of Japan

The Hanwa Expressway (阪和自動車道, Hanwa Jidōsha-dō) is a national expressway in the Kinki region of Japan. It is owned and operated by West Nippon Expressway Company.

== Naming ==
Hanwa is a kanji acronym of two characters. The first character represents Osaka (大阪) and the second character represents Wakayama (和歌山).

Officially, the route is designated as the Kinki Expressway Matsubara Nachikatsuura Route, however this designation does not appear on any signage.

== Overview ==
The expressway is an important route connecting the greater Osaka area with Wakayama, the capital of Wakayama Prefecture. Beyond Wakayama, the route follows a southerly course parallel to the Pacific Ocean to its terminus with National Route 42 in Tanabe.

The first section of the expressway was opened to traffic in 1974. The final section of the expressway (5.8 km between Minabe Interchange and Nanki-Tanabe Interchange) was opened on November 11, 2007.

The expressway is 6 lanes from Matsubara Junction to Sakai Junction, 4 lanes from Sakai Junction to Arida Interchange and the remainder is 2 lanes. Construction to expand the route to 4 lanes is currently underway on the section between Arida Interchange and Gobō Interchange. The speed limit is 80 km/h on 4 to 6-laned sections and 70 km/h on 2-laned sections.

== List of interchanges and features ==
- IC - interchange, SIC - smart interchange, JCT - junction, SA - service area, PA - parking area, BS - bus stop, TN - tunnel, BR - bridge

No.	Name	Connections	Dist. from Origin	Bus Stop	Notes	Location	
Through to Kinki Expressway
10	Matsubara JCT	Nishi-Meihan Expressway; Hanshin Expressway Route 14 Matsubara Route	0.0			Matsubara	Osaka
11	Matsubara IC	Pref. Route 2 (Osaka Chūō Kanjōsen)	0.9		Northbound entrance only	Matsubara	Osaka
12	Mihara-kita IC	Pref. Route 36 (Izumiotsu Mihara Route)	3.9		Tanabe-bound exit, Matsubara-bound entrance only	Sakai	Osaka
12-1	Mihara JCT	Minami-Hanna Road	4.4			Sakai	Osaka
13	Mihara-minami IC	Pref. Route 36 (Izumiotsu Mihara Route)	6.1		Matsubara-bound exit, Tanabe-bound entrance only	Sakai	Osaka
	Sakai TB				Matsubara-bound only	Sakai	Osaka
14	Sakai JCT	Sakai Senboku Road	12.4		Tanabe-bound exit, Matsubara-bound entrance only	Sakai	Osaka
15	Sakai IC	Pref. Route 61 (Sakai Katsuragi Route)	13.2			Sakai	Osaka
16	Kishiwada-Izumi IC	Pref. Route 230 (Haruki Kishiwada Route)	23.3		Matsubara-bound exit, Tanabe-bound entrance only	Izumi	Osaka
	Kishiwada TB				Tanabe-bound only	Kishiwada	Osaka
SA	Kishiwada SA		28.2			Kishiwada	Osaka
17	Kaizuka IC	Pref. Route 40 (Kishiwada Ushitakiyama Kaizuka Route)	32.4			Kaizuka	Osaka
18	Izumisano JCT	Kansai-Kūkō Expressway	38.7			Izumisano	Osaka
19	Sennan IC	Pref. Route 63 (Izumisano Iwade Route)	44.6		Tanabe-bound exit, Matsubara-bound entrance only	Sennan	Osaka
20	Hannan IC; Bus Stop	Pref. Route 256 (Higashi-Tottori Nankai Route); Pref. Route 257 (Jinenda Tottorinoshō Teishajō Route)	46.3	X	Bus Stop Closed	Hannan	Osaka
20-1	Wakayama JCT	Keinawa Expressway; Kitan Connecting Road (planned)	52.6		Matsubara-bound only	Wakayama	Wakayama
SA	Kinokawa SA		55.0		Wakayama JCT←→SA: no access	Wakayama	Wakayama
20-1	Wakayama JCT	Keinawa Expressway; Kitan Connecting Road (planned)	55.8		Tanabe-bound only	Wakayama	Wakayama
BS	Kii Bus Stop			X	Closed	Wakayama	Wakayama
20-2	Wakayama-kita IC	Pref. Route 139 (Azushima Funadokoro Route)	58.7		Tanabe-bound exit, Matsubara-bound entrance only	Wakayama	Wakayama
21	Wakayama IC	National Route 24 (Wakayama Bypass)	60.6			Wakayama	Wakayama
BS	Narukami Bus Stop			S		Wakayama	Wakayama
BS	Kishū Okazaki Bus Stop			X	Closed	Wakayama	Wakayama
21-1	Wakayama-minami SIC	Pref. Route 13 (Wakayama Hashimoto Route)	65.0			Wakayama	Wakayama
22	Kainan-higashi IC	Pref. Route 18 (Kainan Kanaya Route)	70.8		Tanabe-bound exit, Matsubara-bound entrance only	Kainan	Wakayama
BS	Kainan Higashi Bus Stop			X	Closed	Kainan	Wakayama
23	Kainan IC	National Route 42	73.6			Kainan	Wakayama
24	Shimotsu IC	Pref. Route 166 (Oki Kamogō Teishajō Route)	75.9		Tanabe-bound exit, Matsubara-bound entrance only	Kainan	Wakayama
25	Arida IC	Pref. Route 22 (Kibi Kanaya Route); National Route 42	83.0		Matsubara-bound entrance only	Aridagawa	Wakayama
26	Arida-minami IC		84.0		Matsubara-bound exit, Tanabe-bound entrance only	Aridagawa	Wakayama
PA	Kibi Yuasa PA		85.6			Aridagawa	Wakayama
27	Yuasa IC		86.6		Tanabe-bound exit, Matsubara-bound entrance only	Yuasa	Wakayama
28	Hirokawa IC	National Route 42	89.1			Hirogawa	Wakayama
28-1	Minami-Hirokawa IC	Pref. Route 176 (Iseki Gobō Route)	93.6		Tanabe-bound exit, Matsubara-bound entrance only	Hirogawa	Wakayama
29	Kawabe IC	Pref. Route 190 (Gengo Komatsubaru Route)	97.5		Tanabe-bound exit, Matsubara-bound entrance only	Hidakagawa	Wakayama
30	Gobō IC	Pref. Route 27 (Hidaka Inami Route)	101.7			Gobō	Wakayama
31	Gobō-minami IC	Pref. Route 25 (Gobō Nakatsu Route)	103.1		Matsubara-bound exit, Tanabe-bound entrance only	Gobō	Wakayama
32	Inami IC	Pref. Route 28 (Inami Harainami Route)	111.5			Inami	Wakayama
BS	Inami SA; Bus Stop		113.9	S		Inami	Wakayama
33	Minabe IC	National Route 424	123.1			Minabe	Wakayama
34	Nanki-Tanabe IC	National Route 42 (Tanabe Nishi Bypass)	128.9			Tanabe	Wakayama
Through to Kisei Expressway
