= Japan National Route 369 =

Road in Japan

National Route 369
- 国道369号
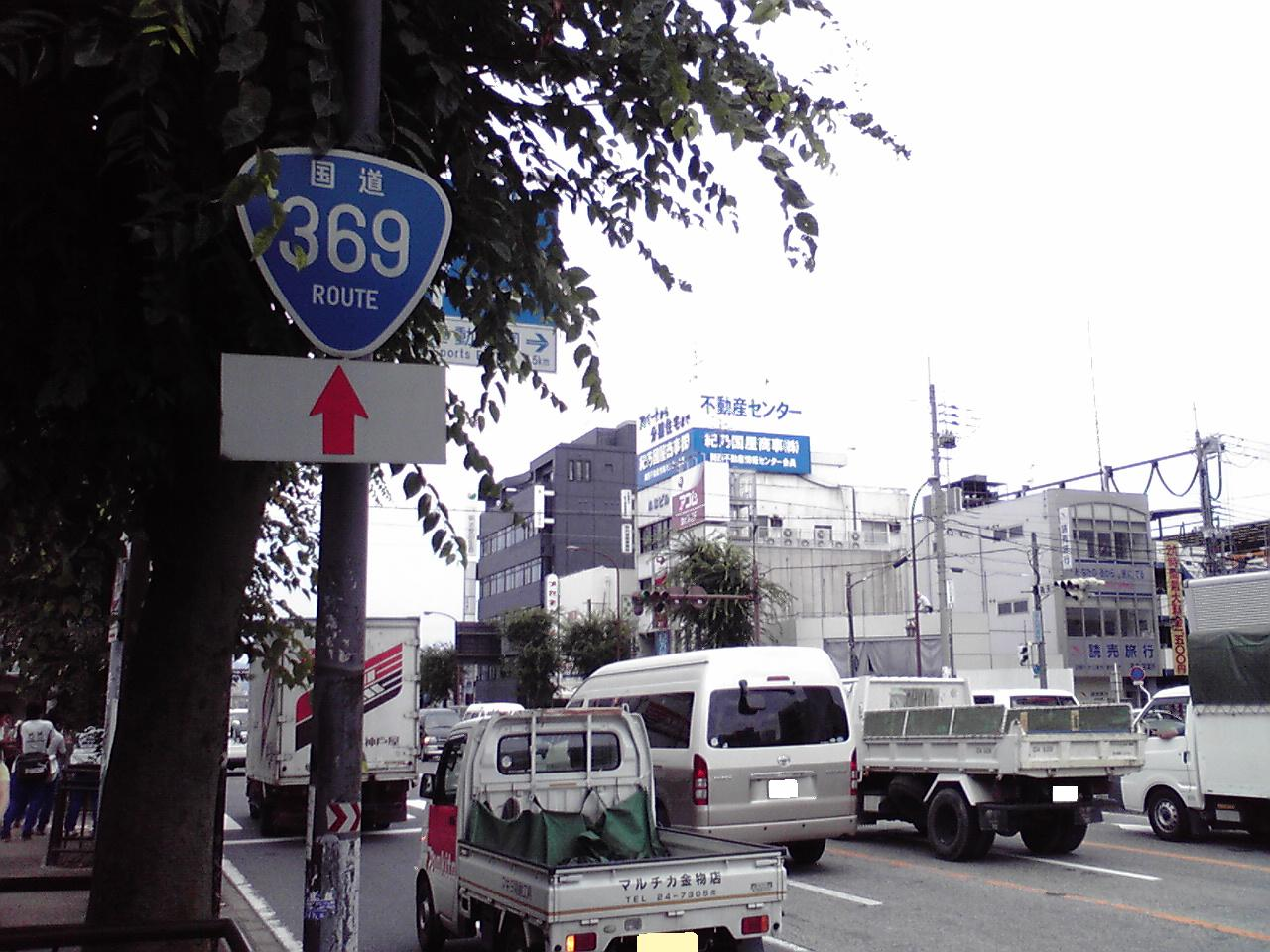

Route information
- Length: 122.3 km (76.0 mi)
- Existed: 1975–present

Major junctions
- West end: Nara, Nara; Nijō-ōji-minami 1-chōme Intersection (34°41′3.72″N 135°48′1.07″E)
- National Route 24; National Route 169; National Route 25; National Route 165; National Route 370; National Route 368
- East end: Matsusaka, Mie; Ōkuroda-nishi Intersection (34°33′47.78″N 136°31′40.83″E)

Location
- Country: Japan

Highway system
- National highways of Japan; Expressways of Japan
← National Route 368	→ National Route 370

National Route 369 (国道369号, Kokudō Sanbyaku-rokujūkyū-gō) is a national highway of Japan connecting Nara, Nara and Matsusaka, Mie in Japan, with a total length of 122.3 km (75.99 mi).
