= Hiroshi Miyamoto =

Japanese shogi player (born 1986)

- Native name: 宮本 広志
- Born: January 27, 1986 (age 40)
- Hometown: Kamitonda, Wakayama

Career
- Achieved professional status: April 1, 2014 (aged 28)
- Badge Number: 296
- Rank: 6-dan
- Teacher: Masayuki Moriyasu (7-dan)
- Meijin class: C1
- Ryūō class: 6

Websites
- JSA profile page

Hiroshi Miyamoto (宮本 広志, Miyamoto Hiroshi; born January 27, 1986) is a Japanese professional shogi player ranked 6-dan.

== Early life and apprenticeship ==
Miyamoto was born in Kamitonda, Wakayama on January 27, 1986. He learned how to play shogi from his father when he was a first-grade elementary school student, and eventually entered the Japan Shogi Association's apprentice school at the rank of 6-kyū under the guidance of shogi professional Masayuki Moriyasu in 1999.

Miyamoto was promoted to the rank of 1-dan in 2003 and then 3-dan in 2005. He entered the 37th 3-dan League (April 2005 – September 2005), but his progress slowed and he was unable to secure full professional status and the rank of 4-dan until he tied for first place in the 54th 3-dan League with a record of 13 wins and 5 losses.

== Shogi professional ==
=== Promotion history ===
Miyamoto's promotion is as follows:

- 6-kyū: September 1999
- 3-dan: April 2005
- 4-dan: April 1, 2014
- 5-dan: March 3, 2016
- 6-dan: March 4, 2025
