= Haya Station =

Railway station in Tanabe, Wakayama Prefecture, Japan

Haya Station 芳養駅
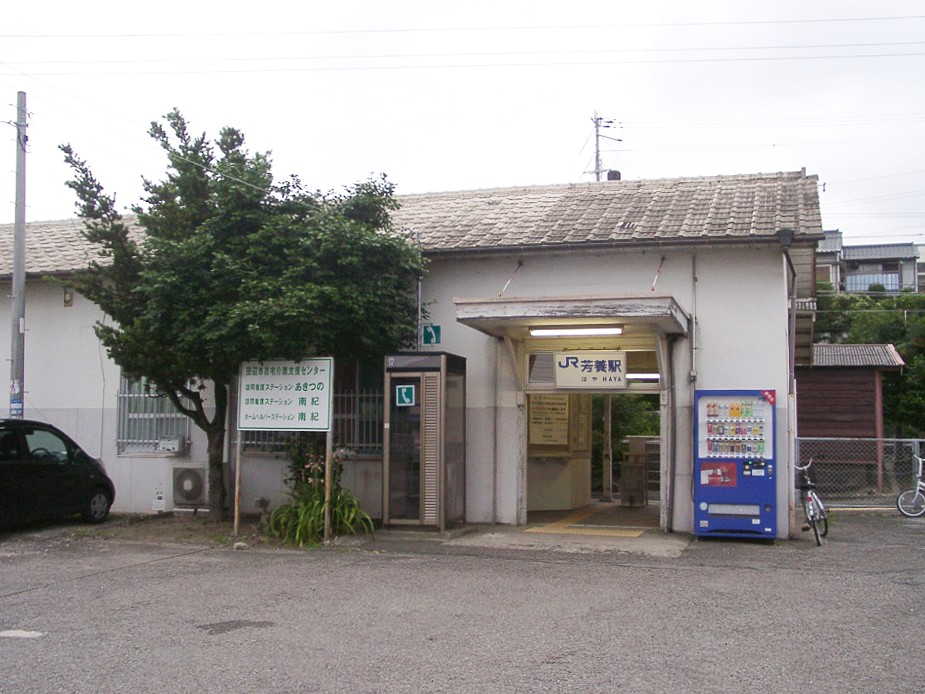
- Haya Station in June 2007

General information
- Location: 25-19, Haya-matsubara 2-chōme, Tanabe-shi, Wakayama-ken646-0063; Japan
- Coordinates: 33°44′49.95″N 135°21′19.08″E
- System: JR-West commuter rail station
- Owner: West Japan Railway Company
- Operator: West Japan Railway Company
- Line: W Kisei Main Line (Kinokuni Line)
- Distance: 289.5 km (179.9 miles) from Kameyama; 109.3 km (67.9 miles) from Shingū
- Platforms: 2 side platform
- Tracks: 2
- Train operators: West Japan Railway Company

Construction
- Structure type: At grade
- Accessible: None

Other information
- Status: Unstaffed
- Website: Official website

History
- Opened: 8 November 1932
- Electrified: 1978

Passengers
- FY2019: 71 daily
Services
Preceding station	JR-West	Following station
W Kisei Main Line (Kinokuni Line)
Limited Express Kuroshio: Does not stop at this station
Kii-Tanabe	Rapid	Minabe
Kii-Tanabe	Local	Minabe
Location
- Location within Wakayama Prefecture Location within Japan

Haya Station (芳養駅, Haya-eki) is a passenger railway station in located in the city of Tanabe, Wakayama Prefecture, Japan, operated by West Japan Railway Company (JR West).

== Lines ==
Haya Station is served by the Kisei Main Line (Kinokuni Line), and is located 289.5 kilometers from the terminus of the line at Kameyama Station and 109.3 kilometers from Shingū.

== Station layout ==
The station consists of two opposed side platforms connected to the station building by a footbridge. The station is unattended.

=== Platforms ===
1	■ W Kisei Main Line (Kinokuni Line)	for Wakayama and Tennōji
2	■ W Kisei Main Line (Kinokuni Line)	for Kii-Tanabe and Shingū

== Adjacent stations ==
«	Service	»
West Japan Railway Company (JR West)
Kisei Main Line
Limited Express Kuroshio: Does not stop at this station
Kii-Tanabe	Rapid	Minabe
Kii-Tanabe	Local	Minabe

== History ==
Haya Station opened on November 8, 1932. With the privatization of the Japan National Railways (JNR) on April 1, 1987, the station came under the aegis of the West Japan Railway Company.

== Passenger statistics ==
In fiscal 2019, the station was used by an average of 71 passengers daily (boarding passengers only).

== Surrounding Area ==
- National Route 42
- Tanabe City Hall Haya Liaison Office
- Tanabe City Hoyo Elementary School

== See also ==
- List of railway stations in Japan
