= Kamitonda =

Kamitonda 上富田町
- Town
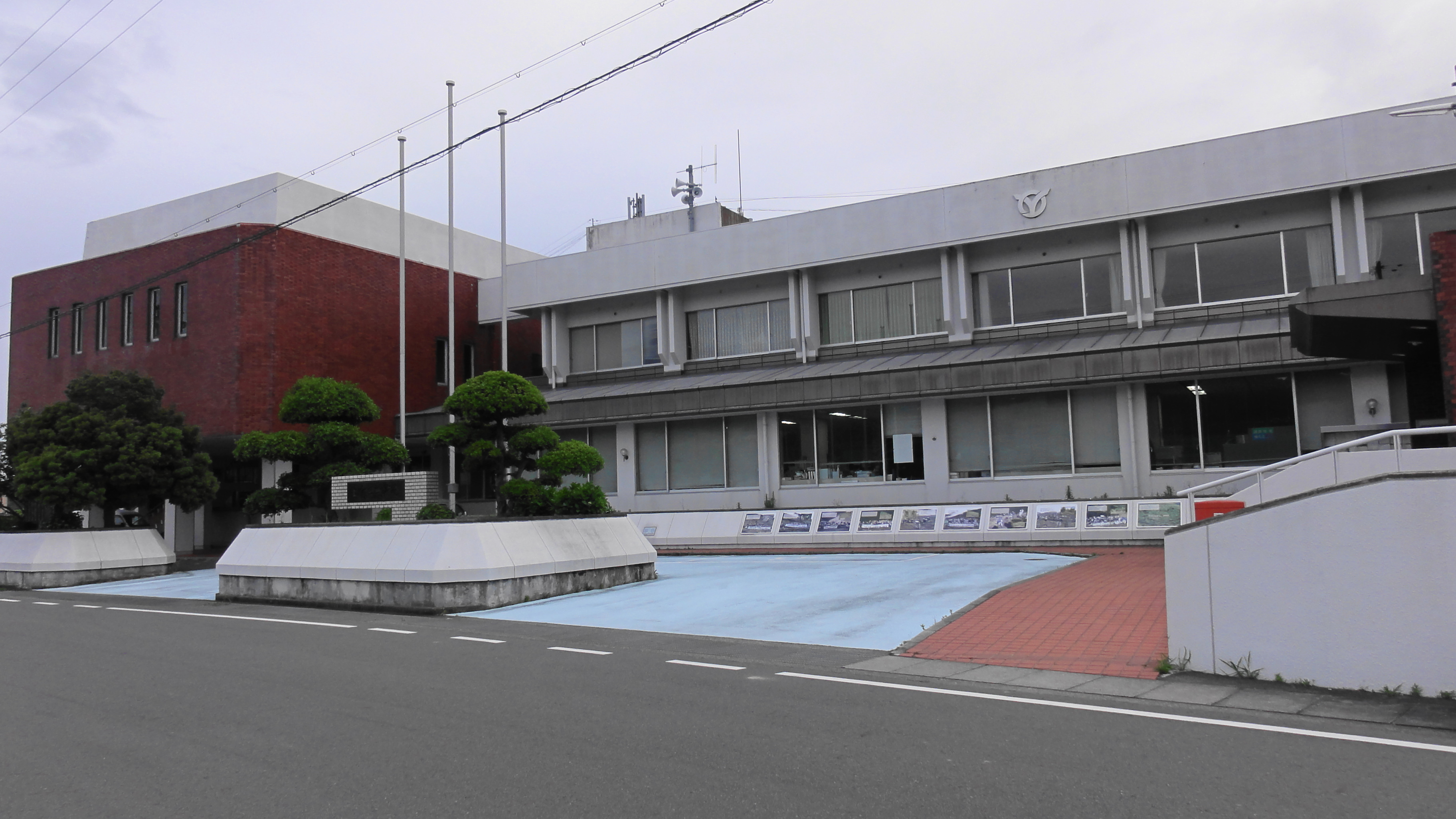
- Kamitonda town office

- Flag Emblem

- Location of Kamitonda in Wakayama Prefecture

- Location in Japan
- Coordinates: 33°42′N 135°26′E
- Country: Japan
- Region: Kansai
- Prefecture: Wakayama
- District: Nishimuro

Area
  - Total: 57.37 km^{2} (22.15 sq mi)

Population (November 30, 2021)
  - Total: 15,678
  - Density: 273.3/km^{2} (707.8/sq mi)
- Time zone: UTC+09:00 (JST)
- Website: Official website
- Symbols
- Flower: Sakura
- Tree: Japanese bayberry

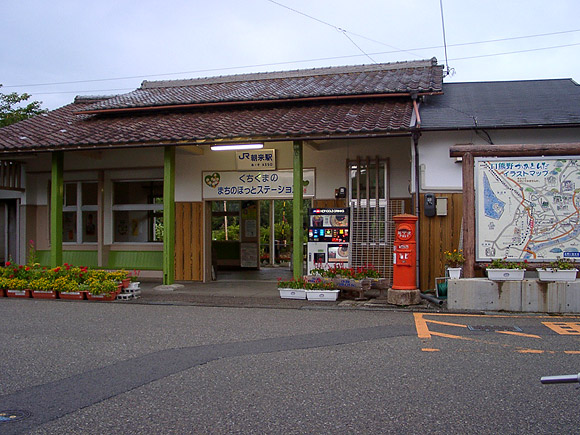
Kamitonda Station

Kamitonda (上富田町, Kamitonda-chō) is a town located in Nishimuro District, Wakayama Prefecture, Japan. As of 1 November 2021, the town had an estimated population of 15,678 in 7,348 households and a population density of 270 persons per km^{2}. The total area of the town is 57.37 square kilometres (22.15 sq mi).

== Geography ==
Kamitonda is located in southern Kii Peninsula in southeastern Wakayama Prefecture. It faces the Pacific Ocean to the east, and the Tonda River flows through the town. The town is surrounded by mountains and is divided into five neighborhoods: Asso, Iwada, Ikuma, Oka and Ichinose. The most populated is Asso.

=== Neighboring municipalities ===
Wakayama Prefecture

- Shirahama
- Tanabe

== Climate ==
Kamitonda has a humid subtropical climate (Köppen Cfa) characterized by warm summers and cool winters with light to no snowfall. The average annual temperature in Kamitonda is 16.6 °C. The average annual rainfall is 2077 mm with September as the wettest month. The temperatures are highest on average in August, at around 26.5 °C, and lowest in January, at around 6.9 °C. The area is subject to typhoons in summer.

== Demographics ==
Per Japanese census data, the population of Kamitonda has increased steadily over the past 60 years.

Historical population
Year	Pop.	±%
1960	9,545	—
1970	9,985	+4.6%
1980	11,835	+18.5%
1990	13,180	+11.4%
2000	14,501	+10.0%
2010	14,807	+2.1%

== History ==
The area of the modern town of Tonda was within ancient Kii Province. The villages of Ichinose and Iwata were established with the creation of the modern municipalities system on April 1, 1889. The two villages merged on September 30, 1956, to form the town of Kamitonda.

== Government ==
Kamitonda has a mayor-council form of government with a directly elected mayor and a unicameral town council of 12 members. Kamitonda, collectively with the other municipalities in Nishimuro District contributes three members to the Wakayama Prefectural Assembly. In terms of national politics, the town is part of Wakayama 3rd district of the lower house of the Diet of Japan.

== Economy ==
The main economic activity of Kamitonda is agriculture, particularly horticulture. The town is one of the main production areas for ume plums used in umeboshi pickles and umeshu liqueur. The raising of Mandarin oranges is also popular. Traditionally, the town was once noted for production of shell buttons, but this has long been supplanted by imported buttons. Light manufacturing includes the production of textiles and industrial bearings.

== Education ==
Kamitonda has five public elementary schools and one public middle schools operated by the town government and one public high school operated by the Wakayama Prefectural Department of Education. The prefecture also operates two special education schools for the handicapped.

== Transportation ==
=== Railway ===
JR West – Kisei Main Line

- Asso

=== Highway ===
- Kisei Expressway
- National Route 42
- National Route 311

== Local attractions ==
- Kumano Kodo, National Historic Site and World Heritage Site
- KuchiKumano Marathon

== Noted people from Kamitonda ==
- Hiroshi Miyamoto, professional shogi player
- Fuyumi Sakamoto, singer
