= Minabegawa, Wakayama =

Dissolved municipality in Wakayama prefecture, Japan

Minabegawa (南部川村, Minabegawa-mura) was a village located in Hidaka District, Wakayama Prefecture, Japan.

As of 2003, the village had an estimated population of 6,561 and a density of 69.66 persons per km^{2}. The total area was 94.18 km^{2}.

On October 1, 2004, Minabegawa was merged into the expanded town of Minabe and no longer exists as an independent municipality.
