= Minabe Station =

Railway station in Minabe, Wakayama Prefecture, Japan

Minabe Station 南部駅
- Minabe Station in May 2026

General information
- Location: 371-2 Shiba, Minabe-cho, Hidaka-gun, Wakayama-ken 645-0002; Japan
- Coordinates: 33.7668°N 135.3242°E
- System: JR-West commuter rail station
- Owner: West Japan Railway Company
- Operator: West Japan Railway Company
- Line: W Kisei Main Line (Kinokuni Line)
- Distance: 294.5 km (183.0 miles) from Kameyama; 114.3 km (71.0 miles) from Shingū
- Platforms: 1 side + 1 island platform
- Tracks: 3
- Train operators: West Japan Railway Company

Construction
- Structure type: At grade
- Accessible: None

Other information
- Status: Unstaffed
- Website: Official website

History
- Opened: 21 September 1931
- Electrified: 1978

Passengers
- FY2019: 709 daily
Services
| Preceding station | JR-West | Following station |
W Kisei Main Line (Kinokuni Line)
Limited Express Kuroshio: Does not stop at this station
| Haya | Rapid | Iwashiro |
| Haya | Local | Iwashiro |
Location
- Location within Wakayama Prefecture Location within Japan

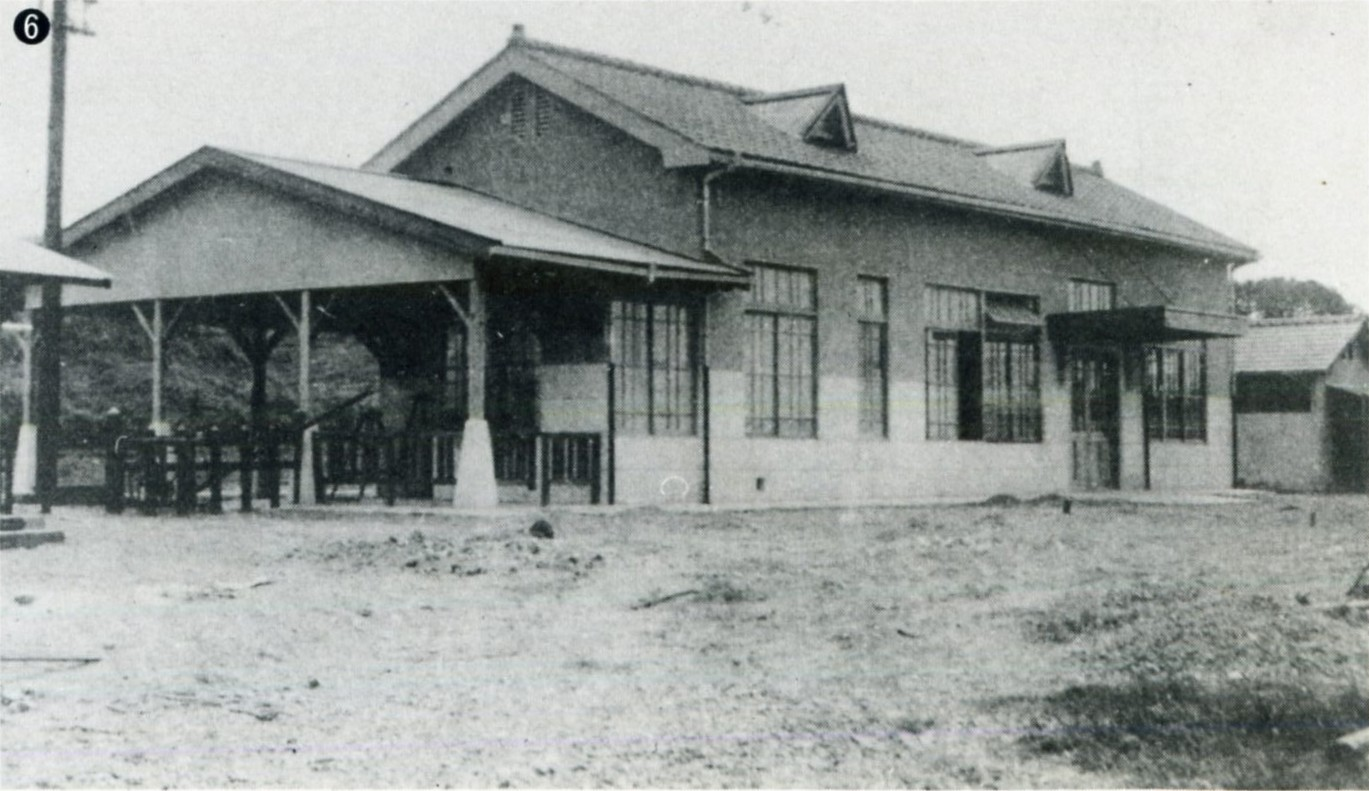
Minabe Station in 1931

Minabe Station (南部駅, Minabe-eki) is a passenger railway station in located in the town of Minabe, Hidaka District, Wakayama Prefecture, Japan, operated by West Japan Railway Company (JR West).

== Lines ==
Minabe Station is served by the Kisei Main Line (Kinokuni Line), and is located 294.5 kilometers from the terminus of the line at Kameyama Station and 114.3 kilometers from Shingū.

== Station layout ==
The station consists of one side platform and one island platform connected to the station building by a footbridge. The station is unattended.

=== Platforms ===
| 1 | ■ W Kisei Main Line (Kinokuni Line) | for Wakayama and Tennōji |
| 2 | ■ W Kisei Main Line (Kinokuni Line) | for Wakayama and Tennōji; Kii-Tanabe and Shingū |
| 3 | ■ W Kisei Main Line (Kinokuni Line) | for Kii-Tanabe and Shingū |

== Adjacent stations ==
| « | Service | » |
West Japan Railway Company (JR West)
Kisei Main Line
| Kii-Tanabe | Limited Express Kuroshio | Gobo |
| Haya | Rapid | Iwashiro |
| Haya | Local | Iwashiro |

== History ==
Minabe Station opened on September 21, 1931. With the privatization of the Japan National Railways (JNR) on April 1, 1987, the station came under the aegis of the West Japan Railway Company.

== Passenger statistics ==
In fiscal 2019, the station was used by an average of 709 passengers daily (boarding passengers only).

== Surrounding Area ==
- National Route 42
- Minabe Town Hall
- Minabe Municipal Southern Elementary School
- Minabe Municipal Southern Junior High School
- Wakayama Prefectural Southern High School

== See also ==
- List of railway stations in Japan
