= Minabe =

Minabe みなべ町
- Town
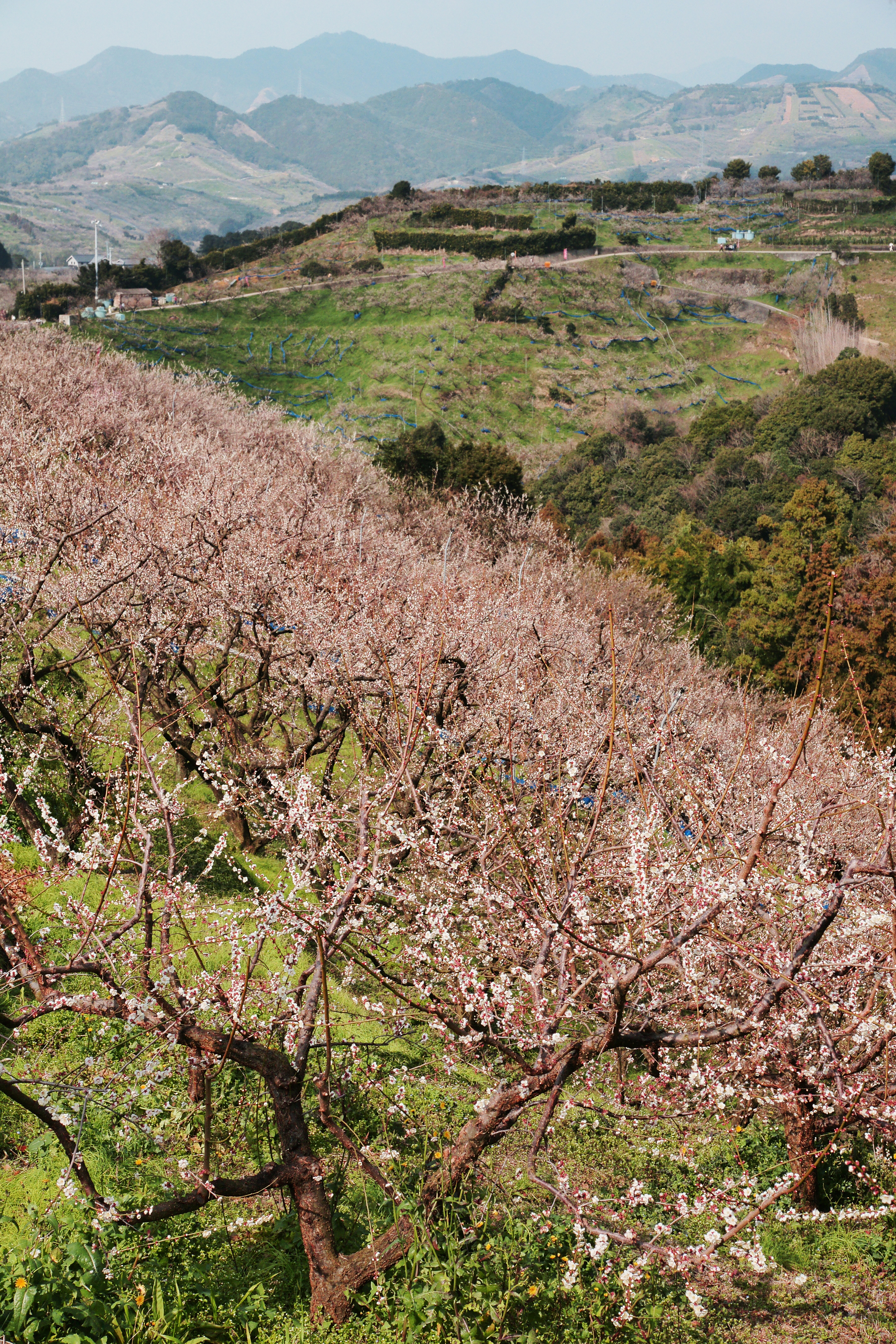
- Minabe Bairin

- Flag Emblem

- Location of Minabe in Wakayama Prefecture

- Coordinates: 33°46′21″N 135°19′14″E
- Country: Japan
- Region: Kansai
- Prefecture: Wakayama
- District: Hidaka

Government
  - Mayor: Yoshimasa Kotani

Area
  - Total: 120.28 km^{2} (46.44 sq mi)

Population (November 30, 2021)
  - Total: 12,137
  - Density: 100.91/km^{2} (261.35/sq mi)
- Time zone: UTC+9 (Japan Standard Time)
- Symbols
  - Tree: Ubame oak (Quercus phillyraeoides)
  - Flower: Ume (Prunus mume)
  - Bird: Japanese bush warbler (Cettia diphone)
  - Fish: Japanese sardine (Sardinops melanostictus)
- Phone number: 0739-72-2015
- Address: 742 Shiba, Minabe-chō, Hidaka-gun, Wakayama-ken 645-0002
- Website: Official website

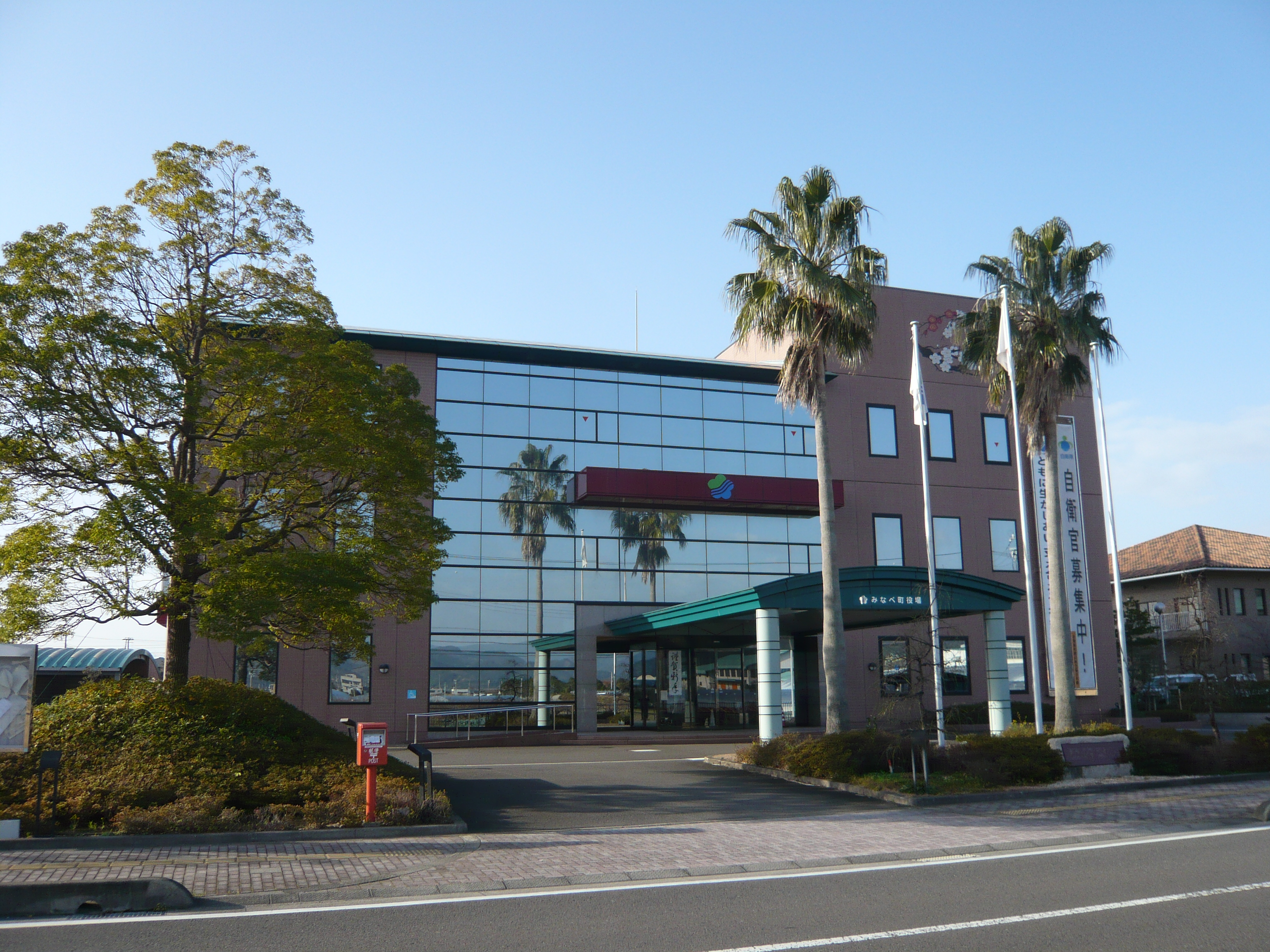
Minabe Town Hall

Minabe (みなべ町, Minabe-chō) is a small town located in Hidaka District, Wakayama Prefecture in the Kansai region of Japan. As of 30 November 2021, the town had an estimated population of 12,137 in 4725 households and a population density of 100 persons per km^{2}. The total area of the town is 120.28 square kilometres (46.44 sq mi).

== Geography ==
Minabe is located at the southernmost edge of Hidaka District in central Wakayama Prefecture. The main part of Minabe, including the train station, government buildings, and business district, lies around the basin of the Minabe River as it flows into Minabe Bay on the Pacific Ocean. There are three distinguishing features of Minabe Bay: Kashima Island situated approximately 1 km offshore, a long non-swimming beach that runs parallel to the central business district, and two prominent rocky points at either end. The central area of town is largely flat and comprises the majority of houses and people. It is moderately populated, with many cultivated fields and buildings.

To the west-northwest of central Minabe is the Iwashiro region which is centered on the Iwashiro River Basin. This area is lightly populated and a mixture of farmland and forested mountains. To the northeast is the Kamiminabe region. This area is partly mountainous. Following the river farther upwards, the valley becomes increasingly narrow and forested, with little ground suitable for cultivation or houses. The path of the Minabe River here is narrow, no more than 30 meters across. Approximately eight kilometers from the center of town is the lightly populated region of Takagi which features some farmland and houses. A further six kilometers up the river valley is the even smaller region of Kiyokawa, which is the end of Minabe. The highest point is located here: 768 meters above sea level.

=== Neighboring municipalities ===
Wakayama Prefecture

- Inami
- Tanabe

== Climate ==
Minabe has a humid subtropical climate (Köppen Cfa) characterized by warm summers and cool winters with light to no snowfall. The average annual temperature in Minabe is 16.2 °C. The average annual rainfall is 2077 mm with September as the wettest month. The temperatures are highest on average in August, at around 26.3 °C, and lowest in January, at around 6.4 °C. The area is subject to typhoons in summer.

== Demographics ==
Per Japanese census data, the population of Minabe has remained relatively constant for the past century.

Historical population
Year	Pop.	±%
1920	12,958	—
1930	14,292	+10.3%
1940	14,297	+0.0%
1950	17,745	+24.1%
1960	16,612	−6.4%
1970	15,352	−7.6%
1980	15,390	+0.2%
1990	15,109	−1.8%
2000	14,734	−2.5%
2010	13,477	−8.5%
2020	11,818	−12.3%

== History ==
The area of the modern town of Minabe was within ancient Kii Province. Its location has been mentioned in ancient texts since the 8th century. The village of Minabe was established with the creation of the modern municipalities system on April 1, 1889. It was elevated to town status on September 11, 1897. The neighboring village of Iwashiro was annexed on April 1, 1954. On October 1, 2004 the village of Minabegawa, from Hidaka District, was merged into Minabe.

== Government ==
Minabe has a mayor-council form of government with a directly elected mayor and a unicameral city council of 14 members. Minabe collectively with the other municipalities of Hidaka District contributes three members to the Wakayama Prefectural Assembly. In terms of national politics, the town is part of Wakayama 3rd district of the lower house of the Diet of Japan.

== Economy ==
The economy of Minabe is centered on forestry and agriculture. The town is famous for its umeboshi (Japanese pickled plum), of which it is the leading producer. The plums are primarily grown on the hillsides and mountainsides of the small valley around the Minabe River. The town is also famous for craft charcoal called binchōtan, which is produced by small, family-operated operations primarily in the upper mountainous areas of Minabe. Commercial fishing and other agricultural products also play a role in the local economy.

== Education ==
Minabe has five public elementary schools and three public middle schools operated by the town government and one public high school operated by the Wakayama Prefectural Department of Education. The town also has one private middle school and one private high school.

== Transportation ==
=== Railway ===
JR West – Kisei Main Line

- Minabe - Iwashiro

=== Highways ===
- Hanwa Expressway
- National Route 42
- National Route 424

== Local attractions ==
- Minabe Bairin
- Senri-no-hama, part of the Kumano Kodō
