= Japan National Route 311 =

Road in Japan

National Route 311
- 国道311号

Route information
- Length: 147.4 km (91.6 mi)

Location
- Country: Japan

Highway system
- National highways of Japan; Expressways of Japan
| ← National Route 310 | → National Route 312 |

National Route 311 is a national highway of Japan connecting Owase, Mie and Kamitonda, Wakayama in Japan, with a total length of 147.4 km (91.59 mi).
