= Iwashiro Station =

Railway station in Minabe, Wakayama Prefecture, Japan

Iwashiro Station 岩代駅
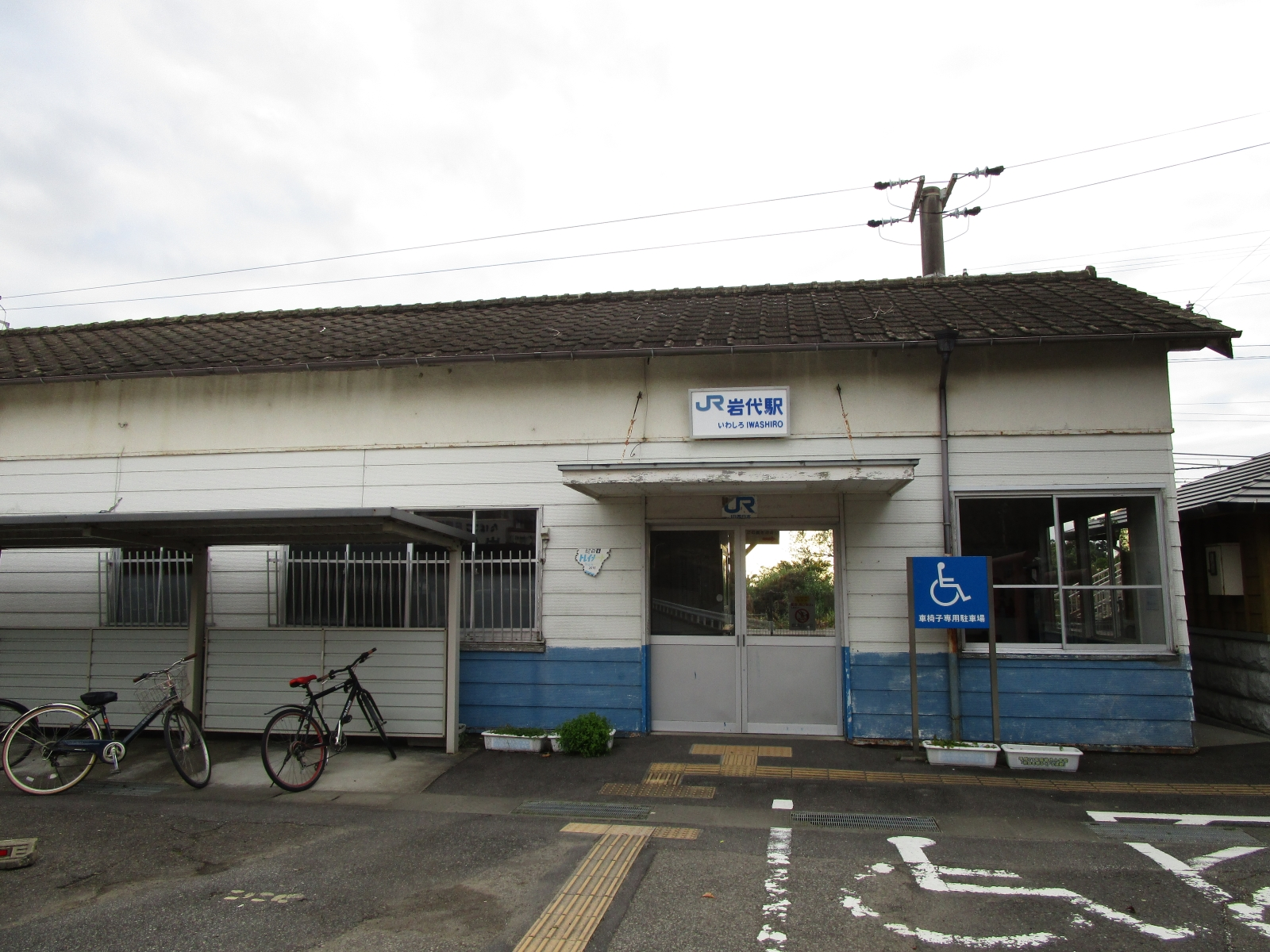
- Iwashiro Station in December 2016

General information
- Location: 199-2 Nishiiwashiro, Minabe-cho, Hidaka-gun, Wakayama-ken 645-0014; Japan
- Coordinates: 33.7804°N 135.2802°E
- System: JR-West commuter rail station
- Owner: West Japan Railway Company
- Operator: West Japan Railway Company
- Line: W Kisei Main Line (Kinokuni Line)
- Distance: 294.5 km (183.0 miles) from Kameyama; 114.3 km (71.0 miles) from Shingū
- Platforms: 2 side platforms
- Tracks: 2
- Train operators: West Japan Railway Company

Construction
- Structure type: At grade
- Accessible: None

Other information
- Status: Unstaffed
- Website: Official website

History
- Opened: 21 September 1931
- Electrified: 1978

Passengers
- FY2019: 73 daily
Services
Preceding station	JR-West	Following station
W Kisei Main Line (Kinokuni Line)
Limited Express Kuroshio: Does not stop at this station
Minabe	Rapid	Kirime
Minabe	Local	Kirime
Location
- Location within Wakayama Prefecture Location within Japan

Iwashiro Station (岩代駅, Iwashiro-eki) is a passenger railway station in the town of Minabe, Hidaka District, Wakayama Prefecture, Japan, operated by West Japan Railway Company (JR West).

== Lines ==
Iwashiro Station is served by the Kisei Main Line (Kinokuni Line) and is located 299.6 kilometers from the terminus of the line at Kameyama Station and 119.4 kilometers from Shingū.

== Station layout ==
The station consists of two opposed side platforms connected to the station building by a footbridge. The station is unattended.

=== Platforms ===
1	■ W Kisei Main Line (Kinokuni Line)	for Kii-Tanabe and Shingū
2	■ W Kisei Main Line (Kinokuni Line)	for Wakayama and Tennōji

== Adjacent stations ==
«	Service	»
West Japan Railway Company (JR West)
Kisei Main Line
Limited Express Kuroshio: Does not stop at this station
Minabe	Rapid	Kirime
Minabe	Local	Kirime

== History ==
Iwashiro Station opened on September 21, 1931. With the privatization of the Japan National Railways (JNR) on April 1, 1987, the station came under the aegis of the West Japan Railway Company.

== Passenger statistics ==
In fiscal 2019, the station was used by an average of 73 passengers daily (boarding passengers only).

== Surrounding Area ==
- Minabe Municipal Iwashiro Elementary School
- Higashiiwashiro River
- Nishiiwashiro River

== See also ==
- List of railway stations in Japan
