= Japan National Route 310 =

Road in Japan

National Route 310
- 国道310号

Route information
- Length: 39.3 km (24.4 mi)

Location
- Country: Japan

Highway system
- National highways of Japan; Expressways of Japan
← National Route 309	→ National Route 311

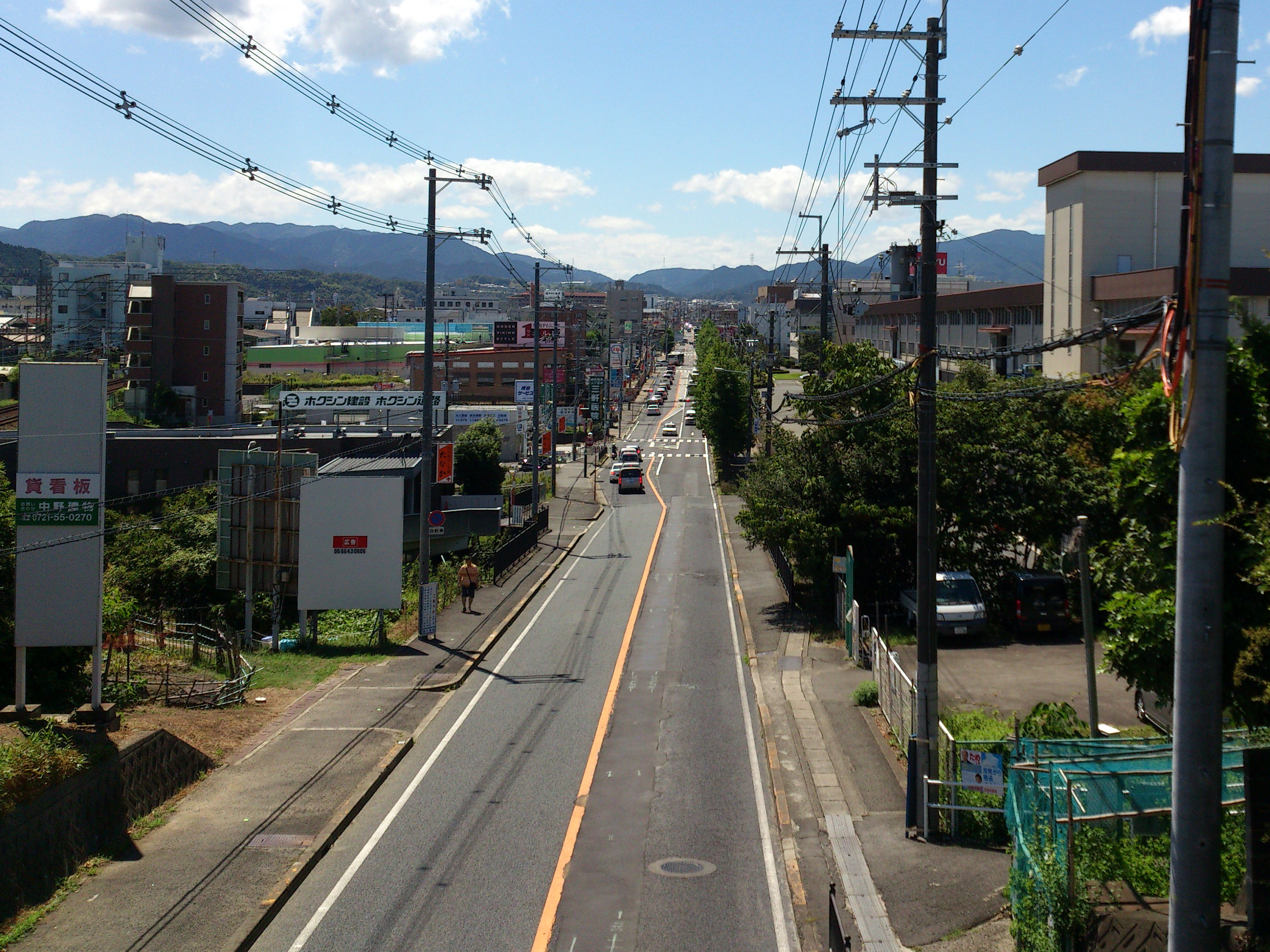
Kawachinagano, Osaka

National Route 310 is a national highway of Japan connecting Sakai-ku, Sakai and Gojō, Nara, with a total length of 39.3 km (24.42 mi).
