= Takahara =

Takahara (written: 高原 or 髙原) is a Japanese surname. Notable people with the surname include:

- Ikuo Takahara (高原 郁夫, born 1957), Japanese footballer
- Keiichiro Takahara (高原 慶一朗, 1931–2018), Japanese billionaire
- Naohiro Takahara (高原 直泰, born 1979), Japanese footballer
- Noritake Takahara (高原 敬武, born 1951), Japanese racing driver
- Peichin Takahara (高原 親雲上, 1683–1760), Japanese martial artist
- Sumiko Takahara (高原 須美子, 1933–2001), Japanese economist and ambassador
- Takahisa Takahara (高原 豪久, born 1961), Japanese businessman
- Toshio Takahara (高原 駿雄, 1927–2000), Japanese actor
- Toshiyasu Takahara (髙原 寿康, born 1980), Japanese footballer
- Yoshiki Takahara (高原 宜希, born 1998), Japanese snowboarder

== See also ==
- Takahara River (高原川, Takahara-gawa), river in Gifu Prefecture, Japan
- Mount Takahara, volcano in Japan
