= Japan National Route 26 =

National highway in Japan

National Route 26
- 国道26号

Route information
- Length: 71.8 km (44.6 mi)
- Existed: 4 December 1952–present

Major junctions
- North end: National Route 1 in Osaka
- South end: National Route 22 / National Route 42 in Wakayama

Location
- Country: Japan

Highway system
- National highways of Japan; Expressways of Japan
← National Route 25	→ National Route 27

National Route 26 (国道26号, Kokudō nijūroku-gō) is a national highway connecting Osaka and Wakayama in Japan.

== Route data ==
- Length: 71.8 km (44.6 mi)
- Origin: Osaka (originates at the terminus of Route 1)
- Terminus: Wakayama (ends at the terminus of Routes 24 and 42)
- Major cities: Sakai, Kishiwada, Izumisano

== History ==
- 4 December 1952 - First Class National Highway 26 (from Osaka to Wakayama)
- 1 April 1965 - General National Highway 26 (from Osaka to Wakayama)

== Intersects with ==
- Osaka Prefecture
- Wakayama Prefecture
