= Iwade =

Iwade may refer to:

- Iwade, Kent, England
- Iwade, Wakayama, Japan
