= Kisei Expressway =

Expressway in Mie and Wakayama Prefectures, Japan

Kisei Expressway
- 紀勢自動車道

Route information
- Length: 94.6 km (58.8 mi)
- Existed: 2006–present

Major junctions
- From: Seiwa-Taki Junction in Taki, Mie; Ise Expressway
- To: Nanki-Tanabe Interchange in Tanabe, Wakayama; Hanwa Expressway

Location
- Country: Japan

Highway system
- National highways of Japan; Expressways of Japan

The Kisei Expressway (紀勢自動車道, Kisei Jidōshadō) is a national expressway in Japan. It is owned and operated by Central Nippon Expressway Company.

== Naming ==
The name Kisei (紀勢) is a kanji acronym consisting of characters found in the former names of the provinces linked by the expressway. Kii Province (紀伊) consists of the eastern part of present-day Wakayama Prefecture, and Ise Province (伊勢) consists of present-day Mie Prefecture.

The expressway is officially designated as the Hanwa Expressway Kisei Route, however this designation does not appear on any signage.

== Overview ==
The first section of the expressway was opened in 2006 (from the origin to Ōmiya-Ōdai Interchange). Another section (to Kisei-Ouchiyama Interchange) opened in 2009 and the next section (to Kii-Nagashima Interchange) opened in 2013. The expressway beyond this point is still in the planning stages and will be built according to the New Direct Control System. Under this system, the financial burden for planning and building expressways will be shared by both the national and local governments; this differs from the established system which is carried out exclusively by the national government. Expressways built under this system are also planned to be toll-free.

The route is 2 lanes for its entire length, with some overtaking areas. The speed limit is 70 km/h.

== List of interchanges and features ==
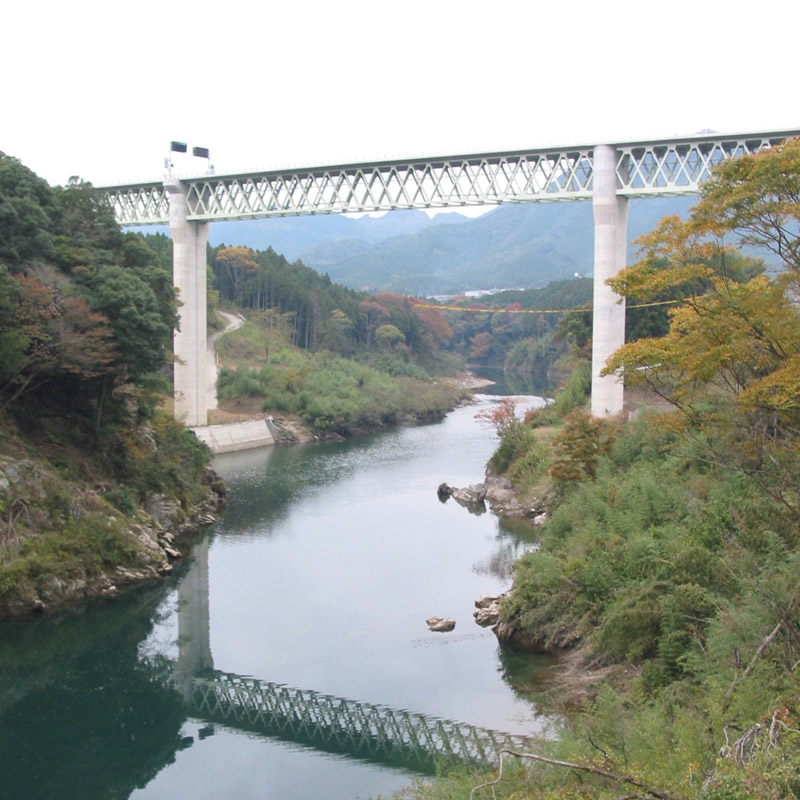
Kisei-Miyagawa Bridge

- (IC - interchange, JCT - junction, PA - parking area, TB - toll gate, TN - tunnel, BR - bridge

=== Between Seiwa-Taki Junction and Owase-minami Interchange ===
No.	Name	Connections	Dist. from Origin	Dist. from Terminus	Notes	Location (all in Mie)
(39-1)	Seiwa-Taki JCT	Ise Expressway	0.0	55.3		Taki
(39)	Seiwa-Taki IC	National Route 42	0.0	55.3		Taki
TN	Shikifuto Tunnel		↓	↑	Length - 414 m	Taki
TN	Kaminose Tunnel		↓	↑	Length - 704 m	Taki
PA	Okuise PA		↓	↑		Ōdai
TN	Mise Tunnel		↓	↑	Length - 593 m	Ōdai
BR	Kisei-Miyagawa Bridge		↓	↑	Length - 537 m	Ōdai
BR	Kisei-Miyagawa Bridge		↓	↑	Length - 537 m	Taiki
TN	Funaki Tunnel		↓	↑	Length - 1,059 m	Taiki
1	Ōmiya-Ōdai IC	National Route 42	13.4	41.9		Ōdai
2	Kisei-Ouchiyama IC	Pref. Route 68 (Kisei Inter Route)	23.8	31.5		Taiki
TB	Taki Toll Gate					Taiki
3	Kii-Nagashima IC	National Route 422	34.1	21.2		Kihoku
PA	Kihoku PA		41.8	13.5		Kihoku
4	Miyama IC	National Route 42	49.2	6.1	New Direct Control System	Kihoku
5	Owase-kita IC	National Route 425	55.3	0.0	New Direct Control System	Owase
This section in planning stages
<6>	Owase-minami IC	Connects to Kumano Owase Road				
This section in planning stages
Through to Hanwa Expressway

=== Between Nanki-Tanabe and Susami-minami Interchanges ===
No.	Name	Connections	Dist. from Origin	Dist. from Terminus	Notes	Location (all in Wakayama)
Through to Hanwa Expressway
34	Nanki-Tanabe IC	National Route 42 (Tanabe Nishi Bypass)	0.0	39.3		Tanabe
	Emergency Exit		↓	↑	Access for Kinan Hospital Authorized vehicles only	Tanabe
35	Kamitonda IC	National Route 42	7.9	31.4		Kamitonda
	Michinoeki Kuchikumano		↓	↑	Northbound only	Kamitonda
36	Nanki-Shirahama IC	National Route 42 Pref. Route 34 (Shirahama Onsen Route)	14.4	24.9		Shirahama
37	Hikigawa IC	Pref. Route 37 (Hikigawa Ōtō Route)	23.7	15.6		Shirahama
38	Susami IC	Pref. Route 38 (Susami Koza Route)	29.9	9.4		Susami
39	Susami-minami IC	Susami Kushimoto Road Pref. Route 36 (Kamitonda Susami Route)	39.3	0.0		Susami
This section in planning stages
