= Japan National Route 368 =

National highway in Japan

National Route 368
- 国道368号
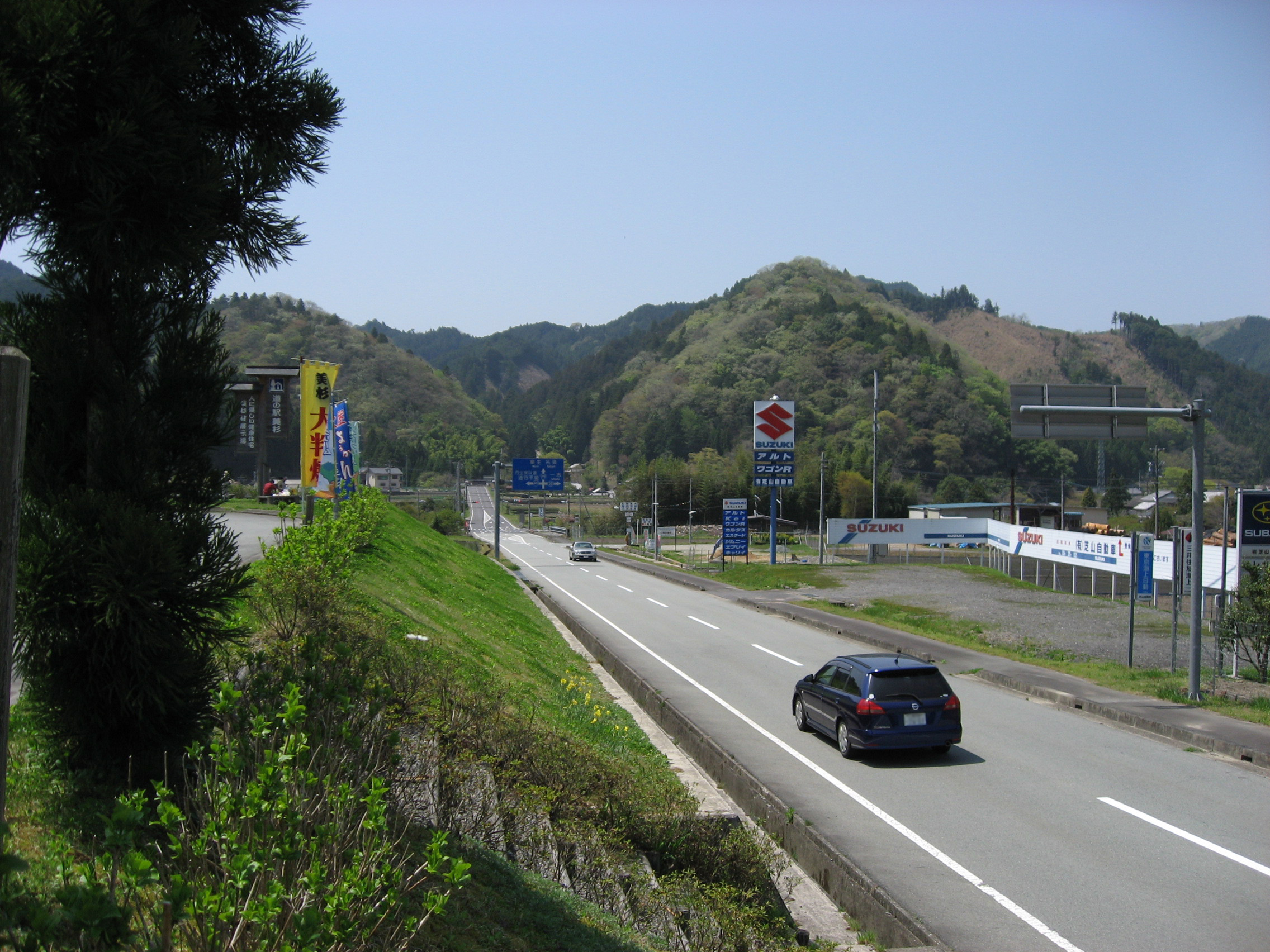

Route information
- Length: 74.5 km (46.3 mi)

Location
- Country: Japan

Highway system
- National highways of Japan; Expressways of Japan
← National Route 367	→ National Route 369

National Route 368 is a national highway of Japan connecting Iga, Mie and Taki, Mie in Japan, with a total length of 74.5 km (46.29 mi).
