= Japan National Route 370 =

Road in Japan

National Route 370
- 国道370号
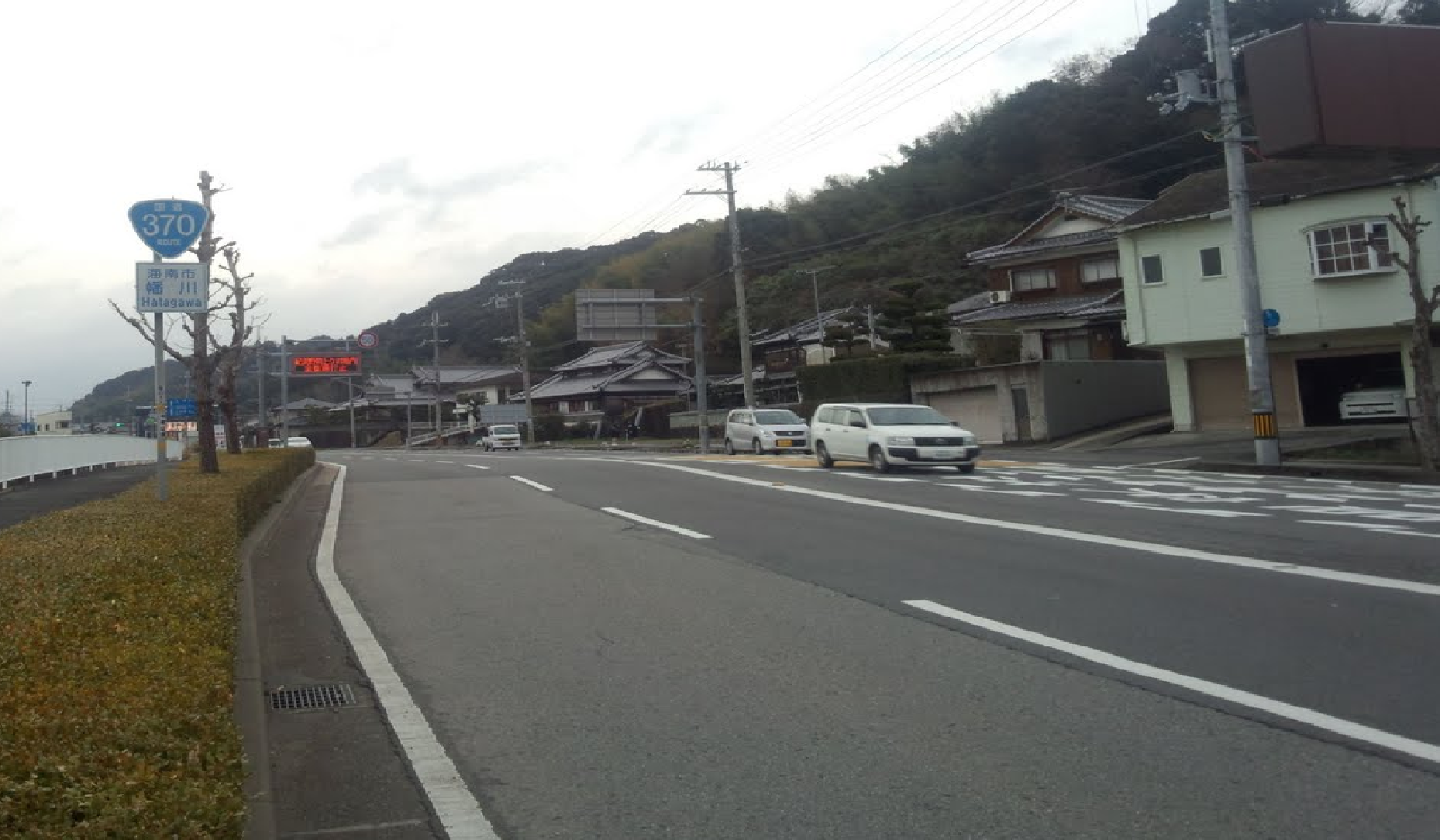

Route information
- Length: 133.2 km (82.8 mi)

Location
- Country: Japan

Highway system
- National highways of Japan; Expressways of Japan
← National Route 369	→ National Route 371

National Route 370 is a national highway of Japan connecting Kainan, Wakayama and Nara, Nara in Japan, with a total length of 133.2 km (82.77 mi).

== Route description ==
A section of National Route 370 in the town of Kimino in Wakayama Prefecture is a musical road.
