= Japan National Route 309 =

National highway in Japan

National Route 309
- 国道309号
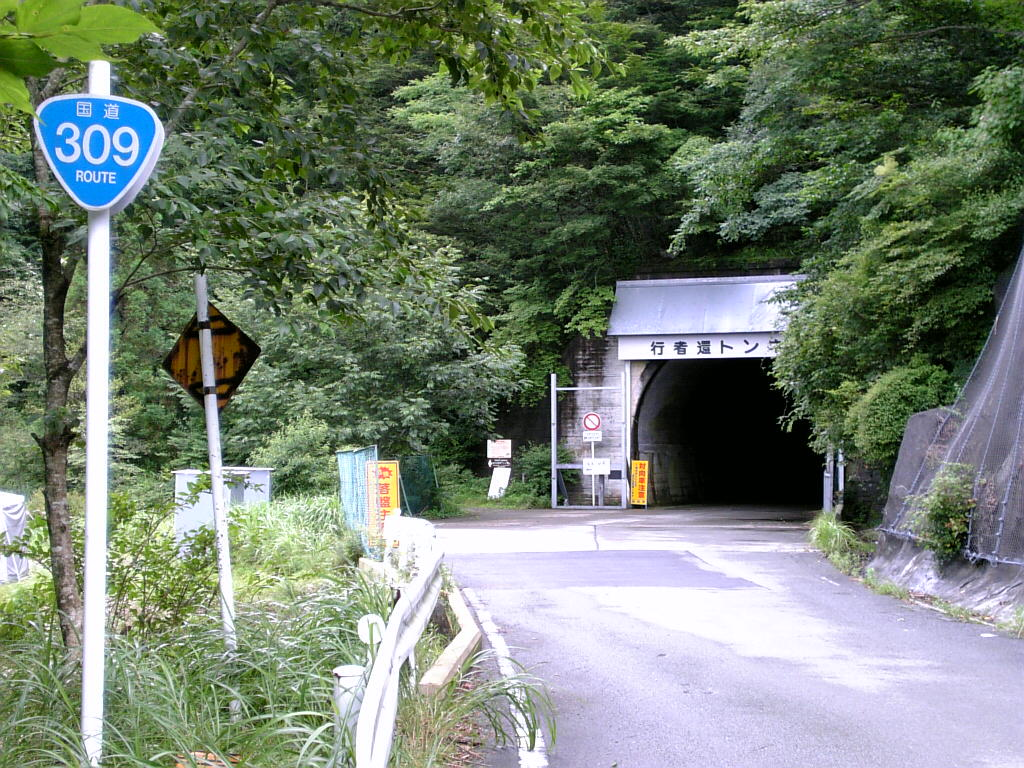

Route information
- Length: 145.5 km (90.4 mi)

Location
- Country: Japan

Highway system
- National highways of Japan; Expressways of Japan
← National Route 308	→ National Route 310

National Route 309 is a national highway of Japan connecting Kumano, Mie and Hirano-ku, Osaka in Japan, with a total length of 145.5 km (90.41 mi).
