= Yuasa, Wakayama =

Yuasa 湯浅町
- Town
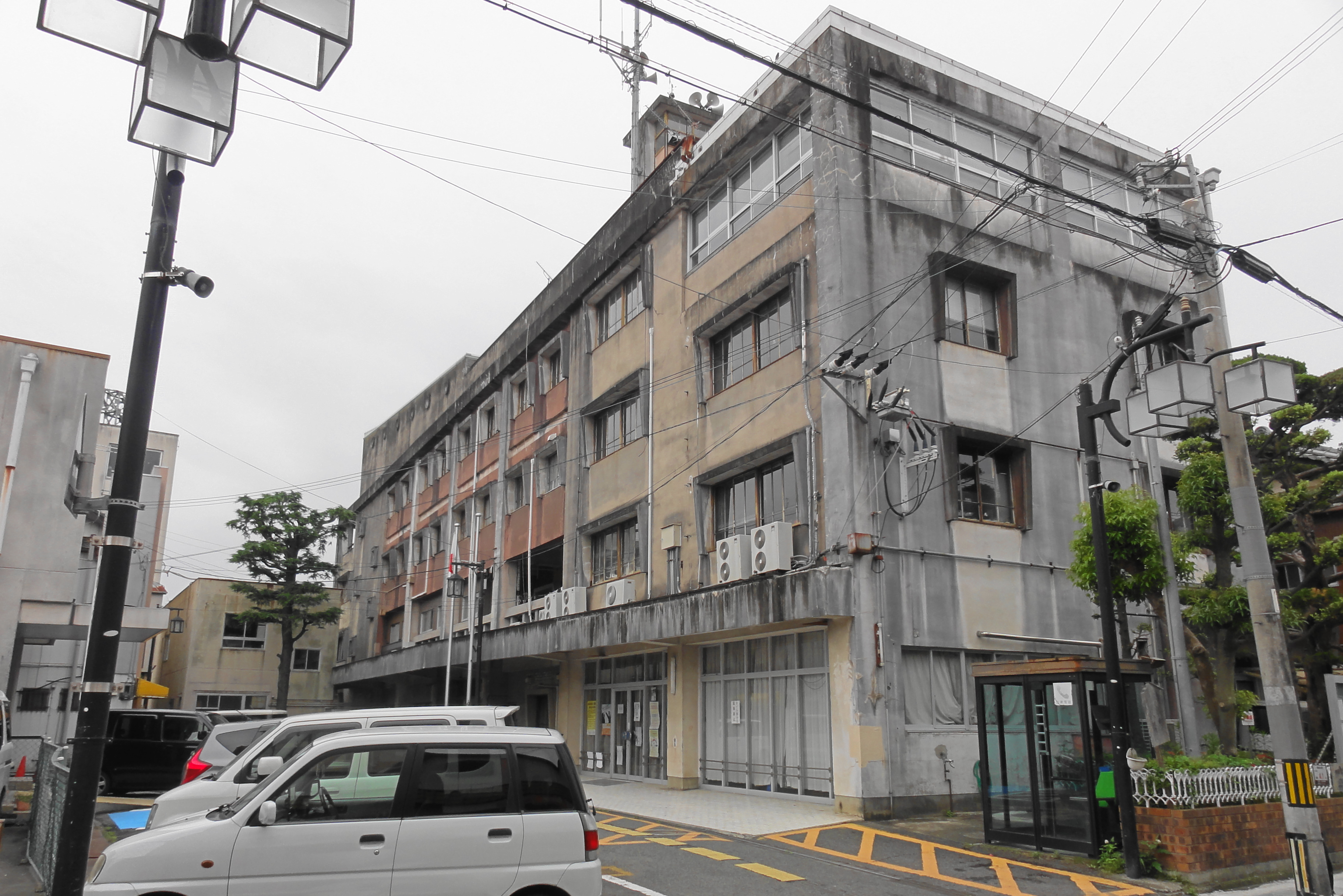
- Yuasa town office

- Flag Seal

- Location of Yuasa in Wakayama Prefecture

- Location in Japan
- Coordinates: 34°02′N 135°11′E
- Country: Japan
- Region: Kansai
- Prefecture: Wakayama
- District: Arida

Area
  - Total: 20.79 km^{2} (8.03 sq mi)

Population (December 1, 2021)
  - Total: 11,413
  - Density: 549.0/km^{2} (1,422/sq mi)
- Time zone: UTC+09:00 (JST)
- City hall address: 668-1 Aoki, Yuasa-cho, Arida-gun, Wakayama-ken 643-0002
- Website: Official website
- Symbols
- Flower: Sanbokan
- Tree: Nageia nagi

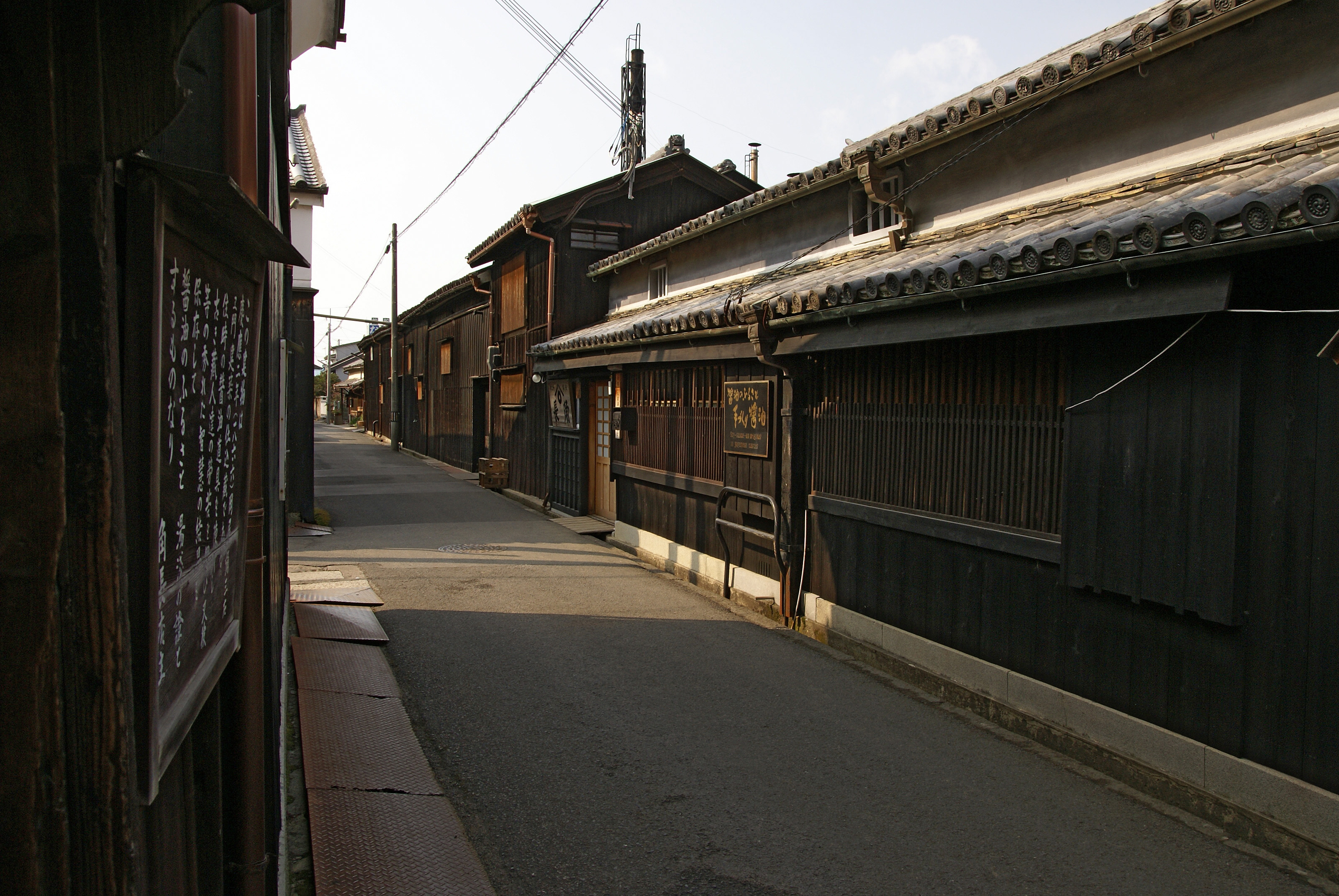
Yuasa old town

Yuasa (湯浅町, Yuasa-chō) is a town located in Arida District, Wakayama Prefecture, Japan. As of 1 December 2021, the town had an estimated population of 11,413 in 5,338 households and a population density of 550 persons per km^{2}. The total area of the town is 20.79 square kilometres (8.03 sq mi). Yuasa claims to be the birthplace of soy sauce.

== Geography ==
Yuasa is located on the coast in north-central Wakayama Prefecture, facing the Kii Channel. The coastline is a ria coast and the climate is mild due to the effects of the offshore Kuroshio Current.

=== Neighboring municipalities ===
Wakayama Prefecture

- Arida
- Aridagawa
- Hirogawa

== Climate ==
Yuasa has a humid subtropical climate (Köppen Cfa) characterized by warm summers and cool winters with light to no snowfall. The average annual temperature in Yuasa is 15.7 °C. The average annual rainfall is 1878 mm with September as the wettest month. The temperatures are highest on average in August, at around 26.0 °C, and lowest in January, at around 5.8 °C. The area is subject to typhoons in summer.

== Demographics ==
Per Japanese census data, the population of Yuasa has been slowly declining over the past 40 years.

Historical population
Year	Pop.	±%
1920	12,119	—
1930	13,611	+12.3%
1940	13,868	+1.9%
1950	17,127	+23.5%
1960	17,094	−0.2%
1970	16,833	−1.5%
1980	17,037	+1.2%
1990	16,525	−3.0%
2000	15,410	−6.7%
2010	13,215	−14.2%

== History ==
The area of the modern town of Yuasa was within ancient Kii Province. The name "Yuasa" appears in Heian period documents in conjunction with Yuasa Shōen, a landed estate in the area which existed into the Nanboku-chō period. During the Edo period, it was the location of a daikansho which administered the surrounding area for Kishū Domain. The village of Yuasa was established with the creation of the modern municipalities system on April 1, 1889. It was elevated to town status on June 22, 1896. The neighboring village of Tasukawa was annexed on March 31, 1956.

== Government ==
Yuasa has a mayor-council form of government with a directly elected mayor and a unicameral city council of 10 members. Yuasa collectively with the other municipalities of Arida District, contributes three members to the Wakayama Prefectural Assembly. In terms of national politics, the town is part of Wakayama 3rd district of the lower house of the Diet of Japan.

== Economy ==
Yuasa is famous for its soy sauce industry, which has flourished since the Edo period. Commercial fishing, especially for whitebait, agriculture and tourism are all-important contributors to the local economy.

== Education ==
Yuasa has four public elementary schools and one public middle schools operated by the town government, and one public high school operated by the Wakayama Prefectural Board of Education.

== Transportation ==
=== Railway ===
JR West – Kisei Main Line

- Yuasa

=== Highways ===
- Yuasa-Gobo Road
- National Route 42

== Sister cities ==
- Cambridge, Minnesota, United States, sister cities since March 15, 1986
- Braham, Minnesota, United States, sister cities since March 15, 1986
- Kerikeri, New Zealand, sister cities since May 13, 1993

== Local attractions ==
- Yuasa old town, designated an Important Preservation District for Traditional Buildings
- Mukai-ji, National Historic Site
