= Japan National Route 425 =

Road in Japan

National Route 425
- 国道425号
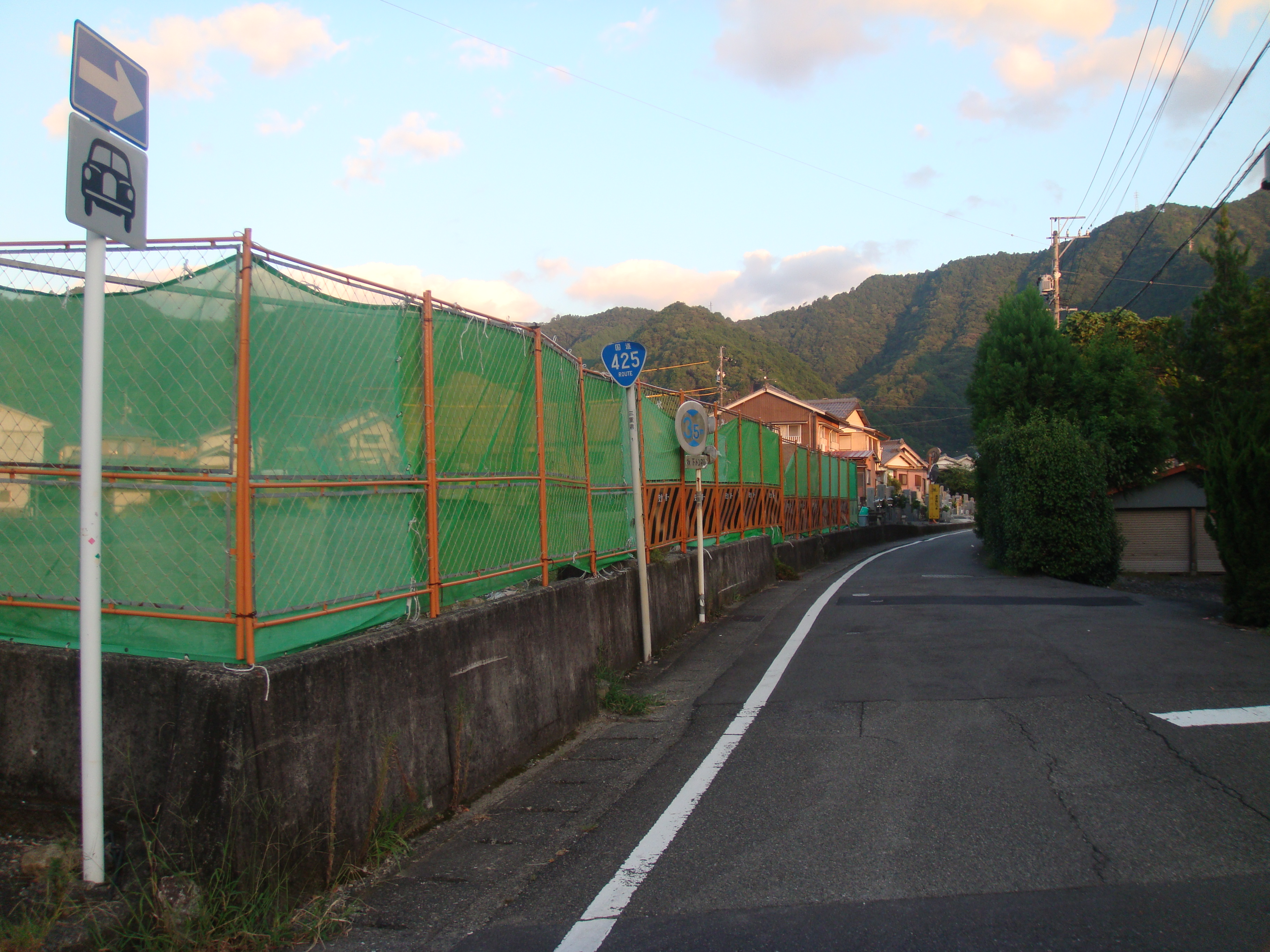

Route information
- Length: 206.2 km (128.1 mi)

Location
- Country: Japan

Highway system
- National highways of Japan; Expressways of Japan
← National Route 424	→ National Route 426

National Route 425 is a national highway of Japan connecting Owase, Mie and Gobō, Wakayama in Japan, with a total length of 206.2 km (128.13 mi).
