= Japan National Route 371 =

Road in Japan

National Route 371
- 国道371号
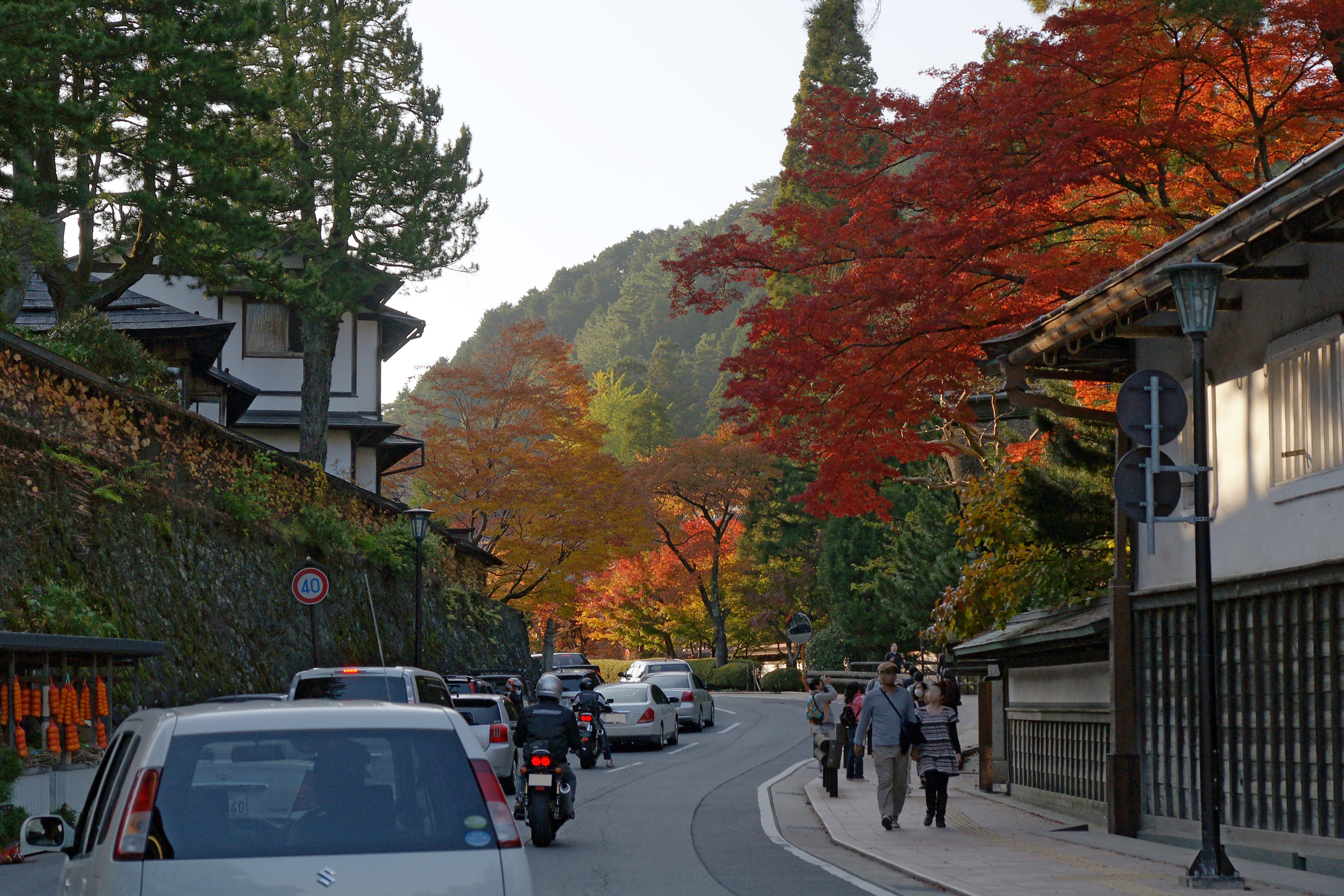

Route information
- Length: 199.6 km (124.0 mi)

Location
- Country: Japan

Highway system
- National highways of Japan; Expressways of Japan
| ← National Route 370 | → National Route 372 |

National Route 371 is a national highway of Japan connecting Kawachinagano, Osaka and Kushimoto, Wakayama in Japan, with a total length of 199.6 km (124.03 mi).
