= Japan National Route 480 =

Road in Japan

National Route 480
- 国道480号
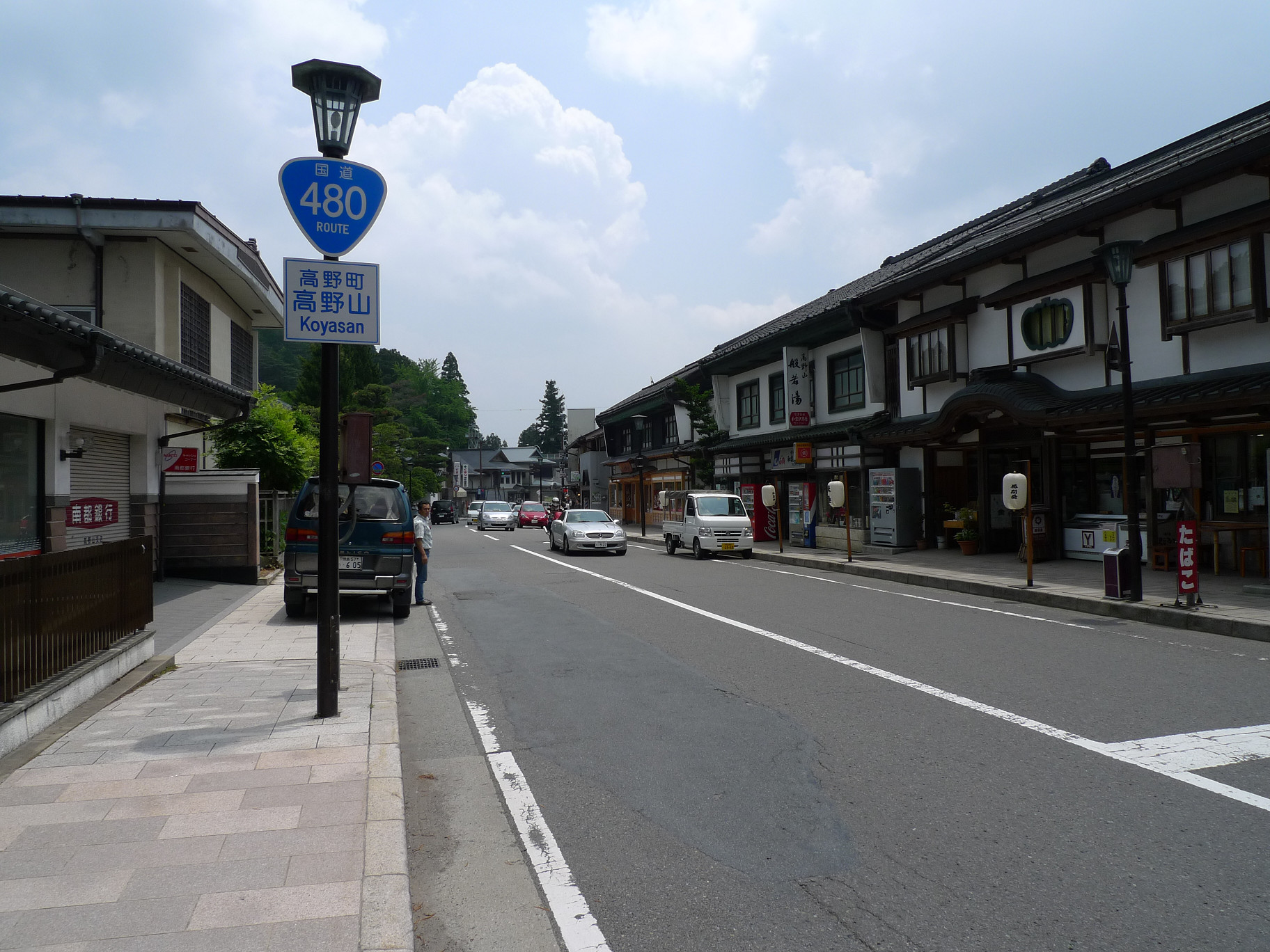

Route information
- Length: 143.6 km (89.2 mi)

Location
- Country: Japan

Highway system
- National highways of Japan; Expressways of Japan
← National Route 479	→ National Route 481

National Route 480 is a national highway of Japan. The highway connects Izumi, Osaka and Arida, Wakayama. It has a total length of 143.6 kilometers (89.2 mi).
