= Japan National Route 24 =

National highway in Japan

National Route 24
- 国道24号

Route information
- Length: 140.3 km (87.2 mi)
- Existed: 1952–present

Major junctions
- North end: National Route 1 / National Route 8 / National Route 9 in Kyoto
- National Route 1; National Route 163; National Route 165; National Route 26; National Route 42
- South end: National Route 26 / National Route 42 in Wakayama

Location
- Country: Japan

Highway system
- National highways of Japan; Expressways of Japan
← National Route 23	→ National Route 25

National Route 24 (国道24号, Kokudō nijūyon-gō) is a national highway connecting Kyoto and Wakayama in Japan.

== Route data ==
- Length: 130.3 km (87.2 mi)
- Origin: Kyoto (originates at junction with Routes 1, 8 and 9)
- Terminus: Wakayama City (ends at Junction with Routes 26 and 42)
- Major cities: Uji, Nara, Tenri, Kashihara, Yamatotakada, Gojō, Hashimoto, Iwade

== History ==
- 4 December 1952 - First Class National Highway 24 (from Kyoto to Wakayama)
- 1 April 1965 - General National Highway 24 (from Kyoto to Wakayama)

== Intersects with ==
- Kyoto Prefecture
- Nara Prefecture
- Wakayama Prefecture
