= E11 =

E11, E-11, E.11 or E 11 may refer to:

- HMS E11, a United Kingdom Royal Navy submarine which saw service during World War I
- Bombardier E-11A, a United States Air Force aircraft
- Andrews County Airport, which has the FAA LID of E11
- E11, a postcode area in the E postcode area, covering the Leytonstone district in Greater London, England
- Bogo-Indian Defence, by Encyclopaedia of Chess Openings code
- E_{11}, an infinite dimensional Kac–Moody algebra
- E11 screw, a type of Edison screw
- E11, a visa for the United States, see Alien of extraordinary ability
- Damansara–Puchong Expressway, Malaysia
- E 11 road (United Arab Emirates)
- European route E11, a European E route in France
- E11 European long distance path, a long-distance hiking path in Europe
- E11 Expressway in Japan:
  - Tokushima Expressway (between Tokushima JCT and Naruto JCT)
  - Takamatsu Expressway
  - Matsuyama Expressway (between Kawanoe JCT and Matsuyama IC)
- E11 (album), by Janice Vidal, 2014
- The E-11, a fictional blaster from Star Wars, based on the Sterling submachine gun.

== See also ==
- 11E (disambiguation)
- European route E011
