= Japan National Route 194 =

Road in Japan

National Route 194
- 国道194号
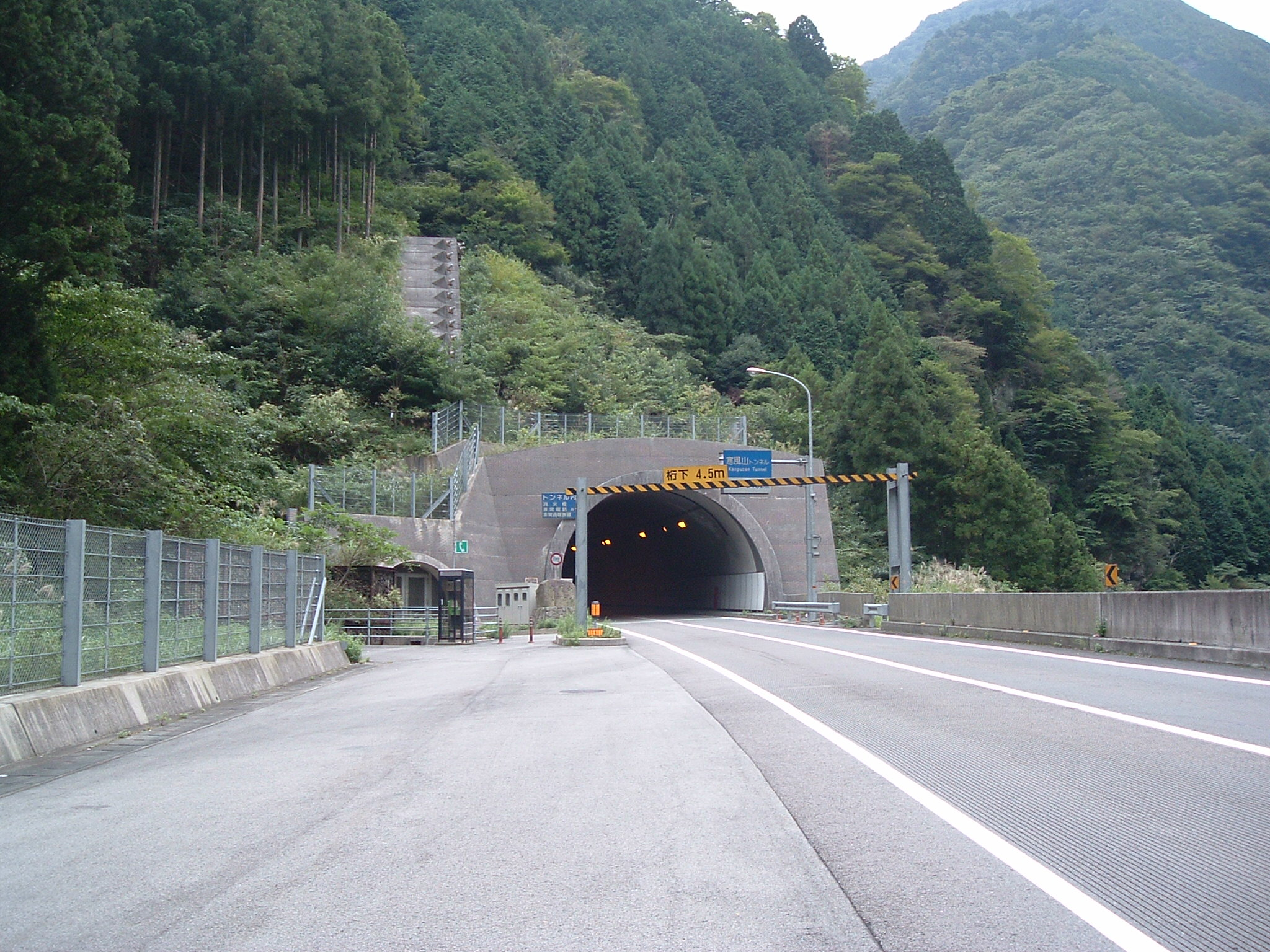

Route information
- Length: 88.3 km (54.9 mi)
- Existed: 1 April 1963–present

Major junctions
- North end: National Route 11 in Saijō
- South end: National Route 32 / National Route 33 / National Route 55 / National Route 56 / National Route 195 / National Route 197 / National Route 493 in Kōchi

Location
- Country: Japan

Highway system
- National highways of Japan; Expressways of Japan
← National Route 193	→ National Route 195

National Route 194 is a national highway of Japan connecting Kōchi, Kōchi, and Saijō, Ehime, with a total length of 88.3 km (54.87 mi).

== History ==
Route 194 was originally designated on 18 May 1953 from Kōchi to Tokushima. This was redesignated Route 55 on 1 April 1963.
