= Matsuyama Expressway =

Expressway in Ehime Prefecture, Japan

Matsuyama Expressway
- 松山自動車道

Route information
- Length: 222.3 km (138.1 mi)
- Existed: 1987–present

Major junctions
- From: Shikokuchūō
- To: Uwajima, Ehime

Location
- Country: Japan

Highway system
- National highways of Japan; Expressways of Japan

The Matsuyama Expressway (松山自動車道, Matsuyama Jidōsha-dō) is a national expressway in Ehime Prefecture, Japan. The expressway is numbered E11 between Kawanoe Junction and Matsuyama Interchange and E56 between Matsuyama and Uwajima-Kita Interchanges under the MLIT's "2016 Proposal for Realization of Expressway Numbering.

== Overview ==
The first section of the Matsuyama Expressway to open was between Zentsuji and Mishima-Kawanoe interchanges on 16 December 1987. The final section of the expressway (16.3 km between Seiyo-Uwa and Uwajima-Kita interchanges) was opened on 10 March 2012. The route between Ōzu and Ōzu-Kitatada interchanges are officially designated as the Ōzu Road, a bypass of National Route 56. These sections are not classified as national expressways but rather as national highways for motor vehicles only with national expressway concurrency (高速自動車国道に並行する一般国道自動車専用道路, Kōsoku Jidōsha Kokudō ni Heikōsuru Ippan Kokudō Jidōsha Senyō Dōro).

== List of interchanges and features ==
- IC - interchange, SIC - smart interchange, JCT - junction, SA - service area, PA - parking area, BS - bus stop, TN - tunnel, TB - toll gate

The entire expressway is in Ehime Prefecture. The expressway is a direct extension of the Takamatsu Expressway. Therefore, the distance and exit numbers continue from the sequence of the Takamatsu Expressway, starting at 56.8 kilometres (35.3 mi).

No.	Name	Connections	Dist. from Origin	Bus Stop	Notes	Location
Through to Takamatsu Expressway
6	Kawanoe JCT	Takamatsu Expressway; Kōchi Expressway	56.8			Shikokuchūō
PA	Kamibun PA		59.0			Shikokuchūō
7	Mishima-Kawanoe IC	National Route 11 (Kawanoe-Mishima Bypass); Pref. Route 333 (Mishima-Kawanoe Port Route)	60.0	○		Shikokuchūō
8	Doi IC	National Route 11; Pref. Route 13 (Nyūgawa Niihama Noda Route)	71.0			Shikokuchūō
PA	Irino PA		74.9			Shikokuchūō
9	Niihama IC	Pref. Route 47 (Niihama Besshiyama Route)	84.3			Niihama
10	Iyo-Saijō IC	National Route 11	93.1			Saijō
SA	Ishizuchiyama SA		106.8	◆	Known otherwise as “Michinoeki Komatsu Oasis”	Saijō
11	Iyo-Komatsu JCT	Imabari-Komatsu Expressway	108.6			Saijō
11	Iyo-Komatsu IC	National Route 11	108.6			Saijō
PA	Sakurasanri PA		126.0			Tōon
12	Kawauchi IC	National Route 11	130.0	○		Tōon
	Tōon SIC				Expected to open in 2023	Tōon
13	Matsuyama IC	National Route 33; Matsuyama Soto Kanjō Road; Pref. Route 190 (Kume Habu Route)	141.9			Matsuyama
SA	Iyo-nada SA		145.5; 145.8		Uwajima-bound; Kawanoe-bound	Iyo
14	Iyo IC	National Route 56	151.9			Iyo
	Nakayama SIC		159.7		Expected to open in 2023	Iyo
PA	Uchiko PA		172.7; 172.9		Kawanoe-bound; Uwajima-bound	Uchiko
15	Uchiko-Ikazaki IC	National Route 56	175.9			Uchiko
TB	Ōzu TB		182.3			Ōzu
16	Ōzu IC	National Route 56 (Ōzu Road)	183.2		Uwajima-bound exit, Matsuyama-bound entrance only	Ōzu
17	Ōzu-Kita IC	National Route 56	184.9		Matsuyama-bound exit, Uwajima-bound entrance only	Ōzu
18	Ōzu-Fuji IC	National Route 197	186.4			Ōzu
19	Ōzu-kōnan IC	Pref. Route 44 (Ōzu Nomura Route)	188.7			Ōzu
20	Ōzu-Minami IC	National Route 56	189.4		Uwajima-bound exit, Matsuyama-bound entrance only	Ōzu
21	Ōzu-Kitatada IC	Ōzu-Yawatahama Road (planned); National Route 197	190.8		Matsuyama-bound exit, Uwajima-bound entrance only	Ōzu
TB	Ōzu-Matsuo TB		193.1			Ōzu
22	Seiyo-Uwa IC	Pref. Route 29 (Uwa Nomura Route); Pref. Route 45 (Uwa Akehama Route)	206.0			Seiyo
23	Mima IC	Pref. Route 31 (Uwa Mima Route); Pref. Route 283 (Hiromi Yoshida Route)	216.9			Uwajima
	Uwajima-Kita IC	National Route 56	222.3			Uwajima
Through to Uwajima Road
1.000 mi = 1.609 km; 1.000 km = 0.621 mi: Incomplete access; Tolled; Unopened
