= Kōchi Expressway =

Expressway in Japan

Kochi Expressway
- 高知自動車道

Route information
- Length: 206.5 km (128.3 mi)
- Existed: 1987–present

Major junctions
- From: Shikokuchūō
- To: Kuroshio, Kōchi

Location
- Country: Japan

Highway system
- National highways of Japan; Expressways of Japan

The Kōchi Expressway (高知自動車道, Kōchi Jidōsha-dō) is a national expressway in the Shikoku region of Japan. The expressway is numbered E32 between Kawanoe Junction and Kōchi Interchange and E56 between Kōchi and Kuroshio-Ōgata Interchanges under the MLIT's "2016 Proposal for Realization of Expressway Numbering.

== Overview ==
The first section of the expressway was opened to traffic in 1992. As of March 2008, the expressway is incomplete in many areas. The next section is scheduled to open in 2009 (Susaki-Higashi Interchange to Shinshōgawa-bashi East Interchange). After this, all future sections will be built according to the New Direct Control System, whereby the burden for construction costs will be shared by the national and local governments and no tolls will be collected. Currently the section between Susaki-Higashi Interchange and Kuroshio-Ōgata Interchange operates according to this principle.

The expressway is 4 lanes from Kawanoe Junction to Kōchi Interchange, and 2 lanes for all remaining sections.

== List of interchanges and features ==
- IC - interchange, SIC - smart interchange, JCT - junction, SA - service area, PA - parking area, BS - bus stop, TN - tunnel, TB - toll gate

The expressway is a direct extension of the Takamatsu Expressway. Therefore, the distance and exit numbers continue from the sequence of the Takamatsu Expressway, starting at 56.8 kilometres (35.3 mi).

No.	Name	Connections	Dist. from Origin	Bus Stop	Notes	Location	
6	Kawanoe JCT	Takamatsu Expressway; Matsuyama Expressway	56.8			Shikokuchūō	Ehime
7	Kawanoe-Higashi JCT	Tokushima Expressway	59.2			Shikokuchūō	Ehime
8	Shingū IC	Pref. Route 5 (Kawanoe Ōtoyo Route)	67.8			Shikokuchūō	Ehime
PA	Umatate PA		69.5		Kawanoe-bound only	Shikokuchūō	Ehime
PA	Tachikawa PA		80.5		Kōchi-bound only	Ōtoyo	Kōchi
9	Ōtoyo IC/BS	National Route 439	86.0	○		Ōtoyo	Kōchi
10	Nankoku IC	National Route 32	107.0			Nankoku	Kōchi
SA	Nankoku SA		109.7			Nankoku	Kōchi
11	Kōchi JCT	Kōchi-Tōbu Expressway	114.7			Kōchi	Kōchi
11	Kōchi IC	Pref. Route 44 (Kōchi Kita Kanjō Route)	114.7			Kōchi	Kōchi
12	Ino IC	National Route 33 (Kōchi-Nishi Bypass)	125.0			Ino	Kōchi
13	Tosa IC	National Route 56 (Tosa-shi Bypass)	134.0			Tosa	Kōchi
13-1	Tosa PA/SIC		139.5		SIC: Kōchi-bound; Open 06:00-22:00	Tosa	Kōchi
TB	Susaki-Higashi TB		148.5			Susaki	Kōchi
14	Susaki-Higashi IC	National Route 56	148.9		Kuroshio-bound exit, Kōchi-bound entrance only	Susaki	Kōchi
15	Susaki-Chūō IC	National Route 56; Pref. Route 310 (Susaki Teishajō Route)	152.2		Kuroshio-bound exit, Kōchi-bound entrance only	Susaki	Kōchi
	Shinshōgawa-bashi East Temporary Interchange	National Route 56	153.4		abandoned on March 5, 2011	Susaki	Kōchi
16	Susaki-Nishi IC	National Route 56	153.8			Susaki	Kōchi
17	Nakatosa IC	National Route 56	160.6			Nakatosa	Kōchi
18	Shimantochō-Higashi IC	Pref. Route 387 (Shimantochō-Higashi Inter Route)	169.2		Kuroshio-bound exit, Kōchi-bound entrance only	Shimanto	Kōchi
19	Shimantochō-Chūō IC	National Route 56	175.3			Shimanto	Kōchi
Planned route Through to National Route 56
20	Shimantochō-Nishi IC	National Route 56	180.7		Shimanto-bound exit, Kuroshio-bound entrance only	Shimanto	Kōchi
21	Kuroshio-Okobushinokawa IC	National Route 56	186.3		Shimanto-bound entrance only	Kuroshio	Kōchi
	Kuroshio-Saga IC	National Route 56	192.5		Planned	Kuroshio	Kōchi
	Kuroshio-Kamikawaguchi IC	Pref. Route 55 (Ōgata Taishō Route)	200.3		Planned	Kuroshio	Kōchi
	Kuroshio-Ōgata IC	National Route 56	206.5		Planned	Kuroshio	Kōchi
Through to Nakamura Sukumo Road
1.000 mi = 1.609 km; 1.000 km = 0.621 mi: Closed/former; Incomplete access; Tolled; Unopened
