= E55 =

E55 may refer to:

- Mercedes-Benz E55 AMG, a performance car
- M113 E55, a variant of the Mercedes-Benz M113 engine
- The Nokia E55 mobile phone
- Nimzo-Indian Defence, Encyclopaedia of Chess Openings code

== Transportation infrastructure ==
- European route E55
- Ocean Ridge Airport (FAA code E55)
- Tokushima-Nanbu Expressway, Anan-Aki Expressway and Kōchi-Tōbu Expressway, route E55 in Japan
- E55 road in United Arab Emirates, from Umm Al Quwain to Al Shuwaib.
