= Seto-Chūō Expressway =

Expressway in Okayama and Kagawa Prefectures, Japan

Seto-Chūō Expressway
- 瀬戸中央自動車道

Route information
- Maintained by Honshu-Shikoku Bridge Expressway Company
- Length: 37.3 km (23.2 mi)
- Existed: 1988–present
- Component highways: National Route 30

Major junctions
- North end: Hayashima Interchange; AH1 San'yō Expressway in Kurashiki, Okayama
- South end: Sakaide Interchange; Takamatsu Expressway in Sakaide, Kagawa

Location
- Country: Japan

Highway system
- National highways of Japan; Expressways of Japan

The Seto-Chūō Expressway (瀬戸中央自動車道, Seto-Chūō Jidōsha-dō) is a tolled expressway that connects Okayama and Kagawa prefectures in Japan across a series of five small islands in the Seto Inland Sea. Built between 1978 and 1988, it is one of the three routes of the Honshu-Shikoku Bridge Expressway Company connecting Honshū and Shikoku islands. The route is signed E30 under Ministry of Land, Infrastructure, Transport and Tourism's "2016 Proposal for Realization of Expressway Numbering."

== Route description ==
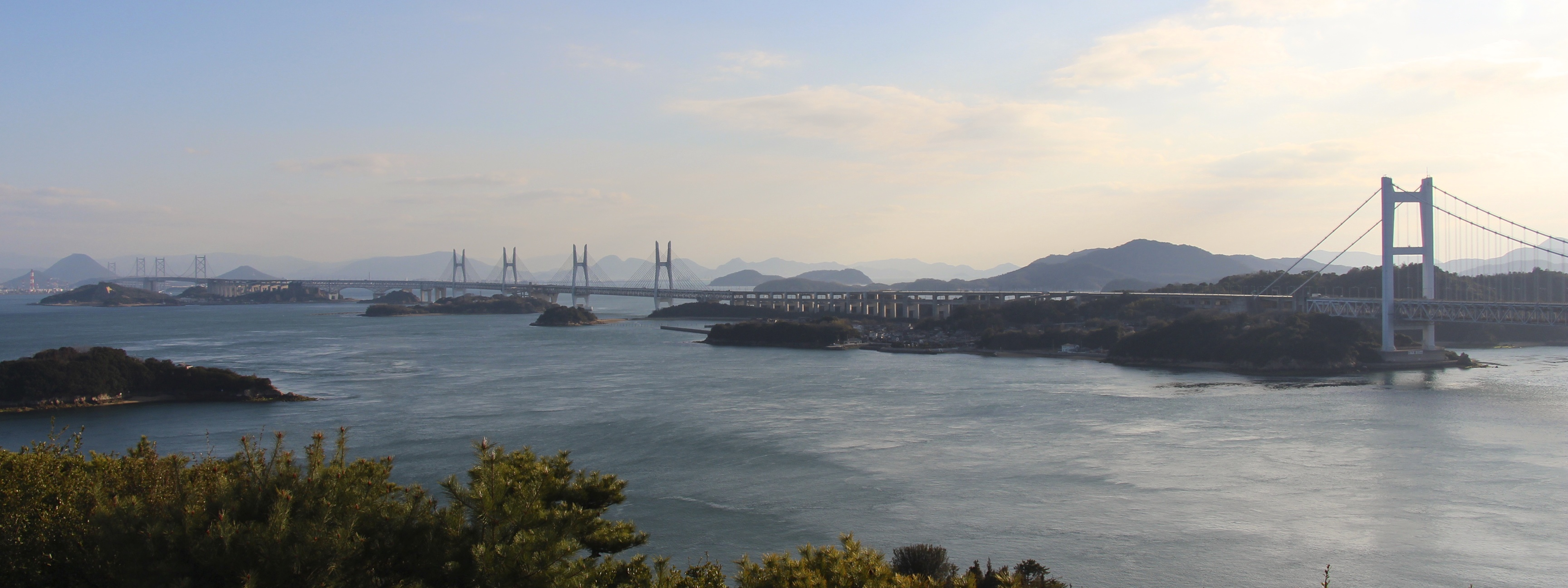
The Great Seto Bridge, part of the Seto-Chūō Expressway

The expressway is 37.3 kilometres (23.2 mi) long with 20.8 kilometres (12.9 mi) of that stretch consisting of bridges, chiefly the Great Seto Bridge. The expressway has four lanes along the entire route from Sakaide, Kagawa to Kurashiki in Okayama. The speed limit is 100 km/h from the expressway's northern terminus at Hayashima Interchange in Kurashiki to Kojima Interchange, also in Kurashiki. The southern remainder of the route has a speed limit set at 80 km/h.

== Junction list ==
TB= Toll booth, SA= Service Area, PA= Parking Area

Prefecture	Location	km	mi	Exit	Name	Destinations	Notes
Through to AH1 San'yō Expressway
Okayama	Kurashiki	0	0.0	1/TB	Hayashima	AH1 San'yō Expressway, National Route 2– Hiroshima, Okayama, Kobe, Okayama Airport	
Okayama	Kurashiki	6.8	4.2	PA	Tsubue		
Okayama	Kurashiki	8.2	5.1	2	Mizushima	Okayama Prefecture Route 21	
Okayama	Kurashiki	15.0– 15.6	9.3– 9.7	SA	Kōnoike		The northbound SA is at 15.0 km, the southbound SA is at 15.6 km
Okayama	Kurashiki	18.8	11.7	3	Kojima	Okayama Prefecture Route 21– Mizushima Industrial Area, Okayama	
Kagawa	Sakaide	22.6	14.0	—	Hitsuishijima	Kagawa Prefecture Route 273– Hitsuishi Island	General vehicles are prohibited from using the exit
Kagawa	Sakaide	24.4	15.2	—	Iwakurojima	Unnamed Road– Iguro Island	General vehicles are prohibited from using the exit
Kagawa	Sakaide	26.4	16.4	—	Yoshima	Kagawa Prefecture Route 274– Yoshima Island	General vehicles are prohibited from using the exit
Kagawa	Sakaide	26.4	16.4	PA	Yoshima		
Kagawa	Sakaide	34.7	21.6	4	Sakaide-kita	Kagawa Prefecture Route 192– Central Sakaide	
Kagawa	Sakaide	37.3	23.2	5/TB	Sakaide	Takamatsu Expressway, National Route 11– Central Sakaide, Takamatsu, Matsuyama	
Through to Takamatsu Expressway
1.000 mi = 1.609 km; 1.000 km = 0.621 mi: Incomplete access

== See also ==
- Japan National Route 30
