= Tokushima Expressway =

Expressway in Tokushima Prefecture and Ehime Prefecture in Japan

Tokushima Expressway
- 徳島自動車道

Route information
- Length: 105.8 km (65.7 mi)
- Existed: 1994–present

Major junctions
- From: Naruto, Tokushima
- To: Shikokuchūō

Location
- Country: Japan

Highway system
- National highways of Japan; Expressways of Japan

The Tokushima Expressway (徳島自動車道, Tokushima Jidōsha-dō) is a national expressway in the Shikoku region of Japan. The expressway is numbered E11 between Naruto and Tokushima Junctions and E32 between Tokushima and Kawanoe-Higashi Junctions under the MLIT's "2016 Proposal for Realization of Expressway Numbering.

== Overview ==
The first section of the Tokushima Expressway to open was the 32.1 km between Aizumi and Wakimachi interchanges on 17 March 1994, making it the first expressway in Tokushima Prefecture. The final section, between Ikawa-Ikeda Interchange and Kawanoe-Higashi Junction, opened on 11 March 2000, completing the connection with the Kōchi Expressway.

The route is 2 lanes for its entire length, with some overtaking areas. The speed limit is 70 km/h.

== List of interchanges and features ==
- IC - interchange, SIC - smart interchange, JCT - junction, SA - service area, PA - parking area, BS - bus stop, TN - tunnel, TB - toll gate

Kilometer markers between Naruto Junction and Tokushima Interchange show the distance from Naruto Junction plus 300 (the marker at Naruto Junction is 300.0 while the marker at Tokushima Interchange is 310.1). Therefore, the distance numbers reset at the Tokushima Interchange, starting at 0.1 kilometres (0.062 mi).

No.	Name	Connections	Dist. from Origin	Bus Stop	Notes	Location	
7	Naruto JCT	Takamatsu Expressway	300.0			Naruto	Tokushima
1-1	Matsushige PA/SIC	Pref. Route 40 (Tokushima Airport Route)	302.5			Matsushige	Tokushima
8	Tokushima JCT	Tokushima-Nanbu Expressway	308.5			Tokushima	Tokushima
1	Tokushima IC	National Route 11 (Yoshinogawa Bypass)	310.1			Tokushima	Tokushima
TB	Tokushima TB		3.1		abandoned on June 4, 2013	Tokushima	Tokushima
2	Aizumi IC	Pref. Route 1 (Tokushima Hiketa Route)	9.1			Aizumi	Tokushima
PA	Kamiita PA		15.9; 16.7	○	Kawanoe-bound; Naruto-bound	Kamiita	Tokushima
3	Donari IC	National Route 318	22.3	△		Awa	Tokushima
PA	Awa PA/SIA		37.1; 37.4	○	Naruto-bound; Kawanoe-bound; SIA planned	Awa	Tokushima
4	Wakimachi IC	National Route 193	41.2	○		Mima	Tokushima
5	Mima IC	National Route 438	52.7	△		Mima	Tokushima
5-1	Yoshinogawa PA/SIC		68.5	○	SIC: Open 06:00-22:00 incl. Yoshinogawa Bus Stop	Higashimiyoshi	Tokushima
6	Ikawa-Ikeda IC	National Route 32; National Route 192	73.8			Miyoshi	Tokushima
PA	Ikeda PA		86.8			Miyoshi	Tokushima
7	Kawanoe-Higashi JCT	Kōchi Expressway	95.3			Shikokuchūō	Ehime
1.000 mi = 1.609 km; 1.000 km = 0.621 mi: Closed/former; Incomplete access
