= Japan National Route 55 =

National highway in Japan

National Route 55
- 国道55号
- National Route 55 highlighted in red

Route information
- Length: 210.2 km (130.6 mi)
- Existed: 1 May 1962–present

Major junctions
- East end: National Route 11 / National Route 28 / National Route 192 in Tokushima
- National Route 195; National Route 193; National Route 493; National Route 32; National Route 56
- West end: National Route 33 / National Route 194 in Kōchi

Location
- Country: Japan

Highway system
- National highways of Japan; Expressways of Japan
← National Route 54	→ National Route 56

National Route 55 (国道55号, Kokudō Gojūgogō) is a national highway of Japan connecting the capitals of Tokushima and Kōchi prefectures, Tokushima and Kōchi in the island of Shikoku with a total length of 210.2 kilometers (130.6 mi).

== Route description ==
National Route 55 spans much of the south side of Shikoku traveling southwest from Tokushima to Cape Muroto along the island's coast. At the cape the route changes direction following the coastline still, but to the northwest towards Kōchi. and there are almost no steep slopes or curves, so it is also used as a driving course. Most of the road runs parallel to the east branch of the Tosa Kaidō, a trade route established during the Yamato period. Near Anan National Route 55 runs along the coast, whereas the east branch of the Tosa Kaidō runs slightly inland. The scenic view zone along the route is also a typhoon-prone area, and traffic restrictions are often imposed from summer to autumn due to roadside collapses, falling rocks, and high waves. Traffic restrictions may also be put in place when a major tsunami warning is issued. Overall, the highway has a total length of 210.2 kilometers (130.6 mi).

== History ==
On 18 May 1953 Secondary National Route 194 was established along what would become current-National Route 55 between Tokushima and Kōchi. It was upgraded to Primary National Route 55 on 1 May 1962. The designation for Secondary National Route 194 was then re-assigned to the current National Route 194 between the cities of Kōchi and Saijō.

== See also ==
- Kōchi-Tōbu Expressway
