= E32 =

E32 may refer to:

- BMW E32
- European route E32
- Tokushima Expressway (between Tokushima JCT and Kawanoe-higashi JCT) and Kōchi Expressway (between Kawanoe JCT and Kochi IC), route E32 in Japan
- West Coast Expressway, route E32 in Malaysia
- Long Win Bus Route E32 in Hong Kong
