= Japan National Route 195 =

National highway in Japan

National Route 195
- 国道195号
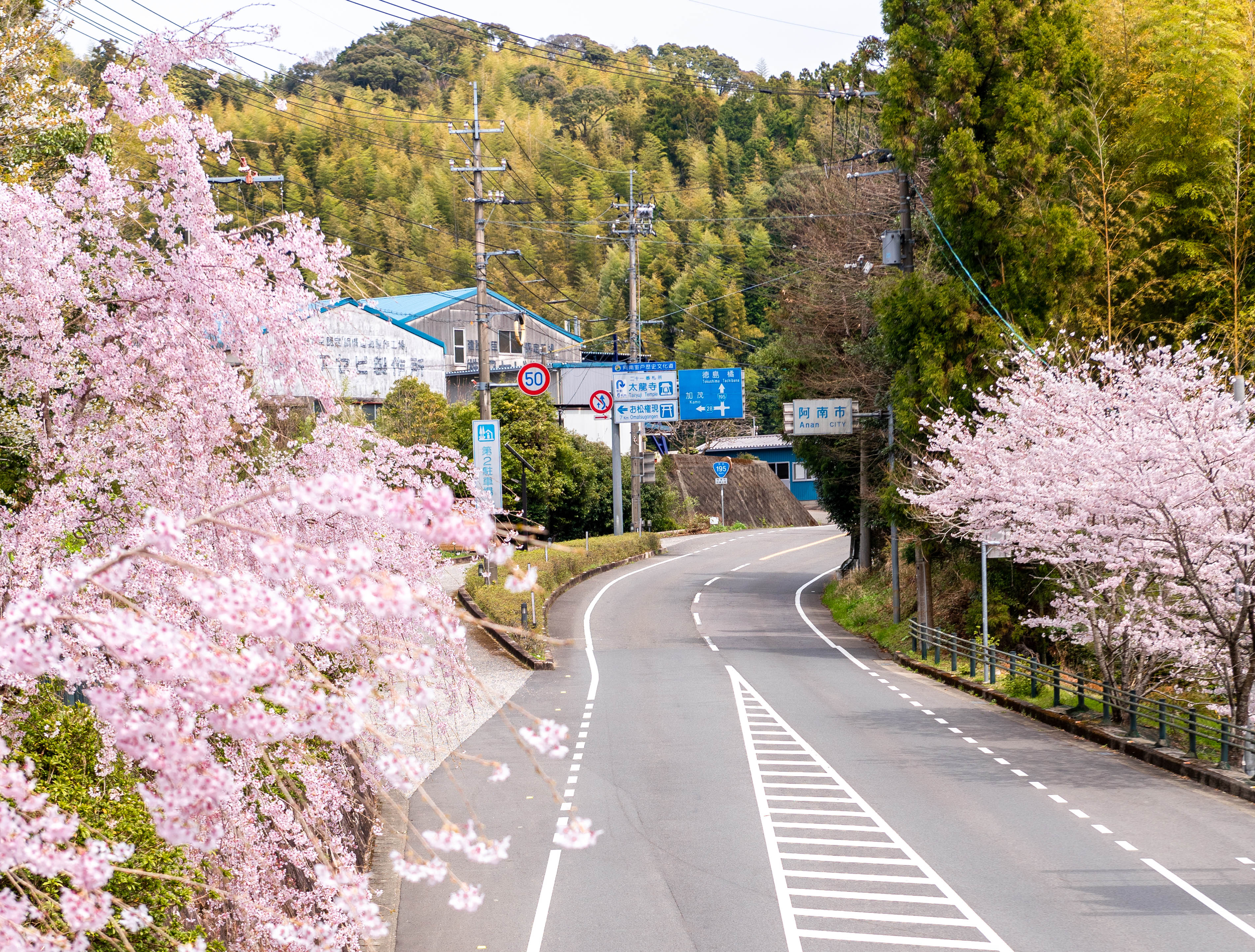

Route information
- Length: 178.2 km (110.7 mi)
- Existed: 18 May 1953–present

Major junctions
- North end: National Route 11 in Tokushima
- South end: National Route 32 / National Route 33 / National Route 55 / National Route 56 / National Route 194 / National Route 197 / National Route 493 in Kōchi

Location
- Country: Japan

Highway system
- National highways of Japan; Expressways of Japan
← National Route 194	→ National Route 196

National Route 195 is a national highway of Japan connecting Kōchi and Tokushima, with a total length of 198.2 km (120.95 mi).
