= Japan National Route 196 =

National highway of Japan

National Route 196
- 国道196号
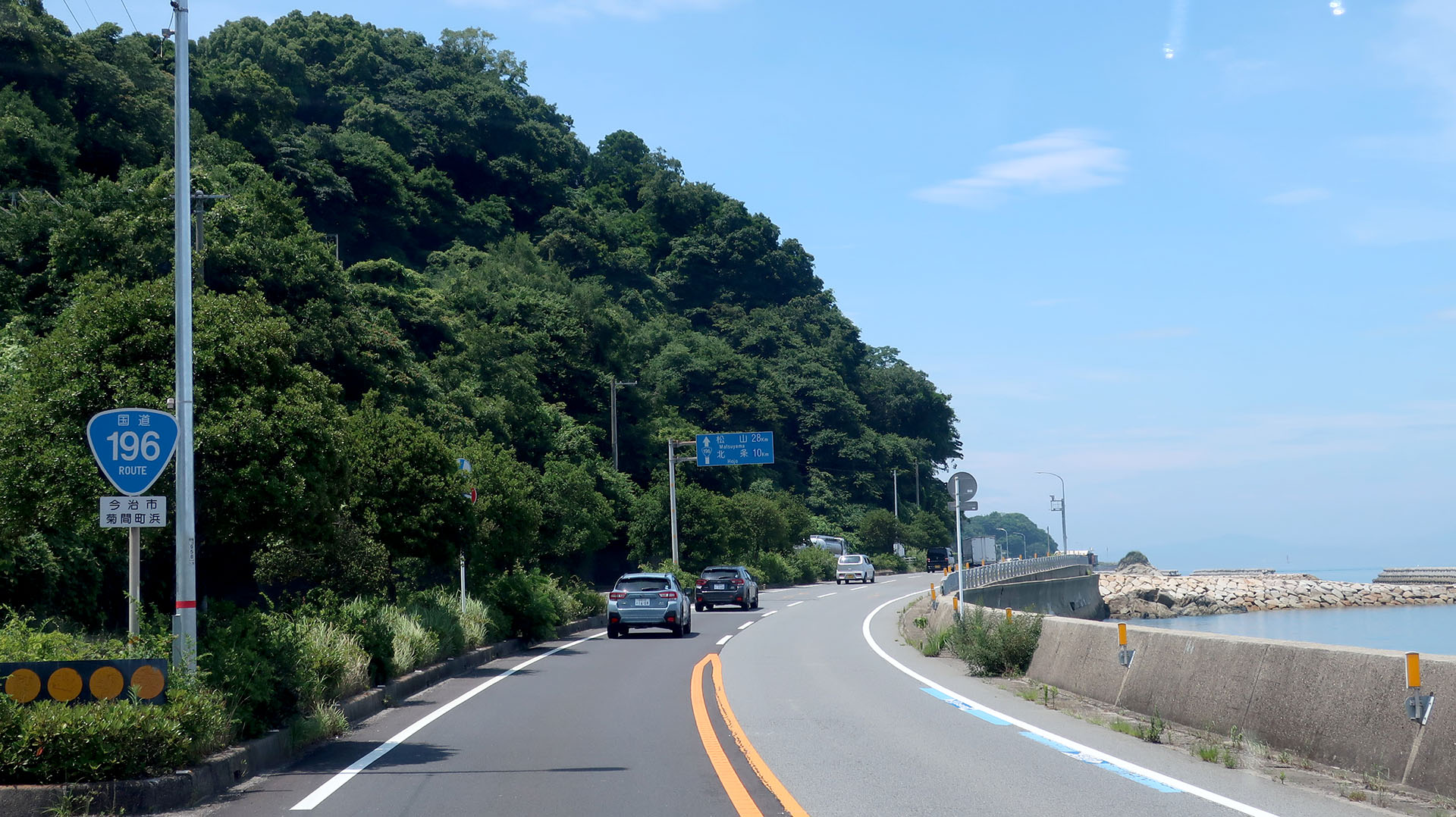

Route information
- Length: 66.4 km (41.3 mi)
- Existed: 18 May 1953–present

Major junctions
- West end: National Route 56 in Matsuyama
- East end: National Route 11 in Saijō, Ehime

Location
- Country: Japan

Highway system
- National highways of Japan; Expressways of Japan
← National Route 195	→ National Route 197

National Route 196 is a national highway of Japan connecting Matsuyama and Saijō, Ehime in Japan, with a total length of 66.4 km (41.26 mi).
