= Q69 =

Q69 may refer to:

- Q69 (New York City bus)
- Al-Haqqa, the 69th surah of the Quran
- French submarine Gay-Lussac
- Ocean Ridge Airport, in Mendocino County, California, United States
