= Takamatsu Expressway =

Expressway in Japan

Takamatsu Expressway
- 高松自動車道

Route information
- Length: 124.2 km (77.2 mi)
- Existed: 1987–present

Major junctions
- From: Naruto, Tokushima
- To: Shikokuchūō

Location
- Country: Japan

Highway system
- National highways of Japan; Expressways of Japan

The Takamatsu Expressway (高松自動車道, Takamatsu Jidōsha-dō) is an expressway in the Shikoku region of Japan. The expressway is numbered E11.

== Overview ==
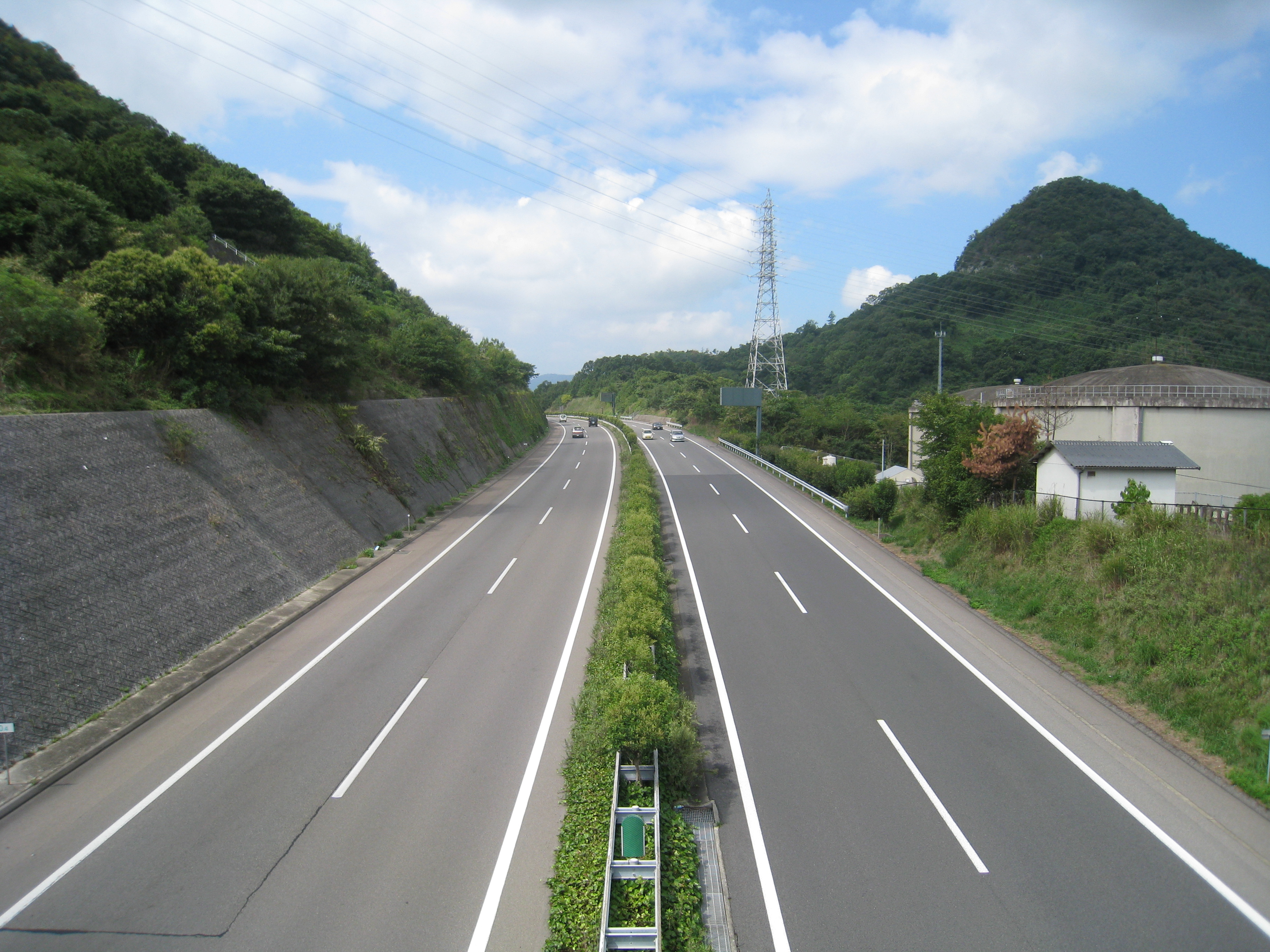
Takamatsu Expressway in Takamatsu, Kagawa

The expressway is an important route connecting the greater Osaka area with Takamatsu, the capital of Kagawa Prefecture. Beyond Takamatsu, the route follows a westerly course parallel to the Seto Inland Sea to its terminus with Matsuyama Expressway and Kōchi Expressway in Shikokuchūō.

The speed limit is 80 km/h along the majority of the route; there are some 100 km/h sections between Naruto Junction and Tsuda-Higashi Interchange and Takamatsu-Nishi Interchange and Kawanoe Junction.

== History ==
The first section of the Takamatsu Expressway to open was between Zentsuji and Mishima-Kawanoe interchanges on 16 December 1987. The final section of the expressway (9.1 km between Takamatsu-Chūō and Takamatsu-Nishi Interchanges) was opened on 30 March 2003. The 16.2 kilometres (10.1 mi) long Takamatsu-higashi Road was incorporated into the Takamatsu Expressway on 21 November 2017.

== List of interchanges and features ==
- IC - interchange, SIC - smart interchange, JCT - junction, SA - service area, PA - parking area, BS - bus stop, TN - tunnel, TB - toll gate

=== Naruto TB - Takamatsu-Nishi IC ===
Due to open the expressway from Takamatsu towards Matsuyama, kilometer markers between Naruto Toll Gate and Takamatsu-Nishi Interchange show the distance from Naruto Toll Gate plus 100 (the marker at Naruto Toll Gate is 100.0 while the marker at Takamatsu-Nishi Interchange is 165.4). Therefore, the exit numbers continue from the sequence of the Takamatsu-Nishi Interchange, starting at 7.

No.	Name	Connections	Dist. from Origin	Bus Stop	Notes	Location	
Through to Kobe-Awaji-Naruto Expressway
TB	Naruto TB		100.0		Sakaide-bound entrance only	Naruto	Tokushima
12	Naruto IC	National Route 11 (Yoshinogawa Bypass)	100.2			Naruto	Tokushima
7	Naruto JCT	Tokushima Expressway	101.6			Naruto	Tokushima
PA	Naruto-Nishi PA		108.2; 108.5	○	Sakaide-bound; Naruto-bound	Naruto	Tokushima
8	Itano IC	Pref. Route 229 (Itano Inter Route)	110.5			Itano	Tokushima
9	Hiketa IC	Pref. Route 40 (Shirotori Hiketa Route)	123.3	○		Higashikagawa	Kagawa
10	Shirotori-Hiketa IC	Pref. Route 41 (Shirotori-Hiketa Inter Route)	128.5			Higashikagawa	Kagawa
BS	Ōchi BS		130.2	○		Higashikagawa	Kagawa
11	Tsuda-Higashi IC	National Route 11	136.2			Sanuki	Kagawa
SA	Tsuda-no-matsubara SA/BS		137.3	○		Sanuki	Kagawa
12	Tsuda-Samukawa IC	Pref. Route 37 (Miki Tsuda Route)	141.4			Sanuki	Kagawa
13	Shido IC	Pref. Route 141 (Ishida Higashishido Route)	144.8			Sanuki	Kagawa
BS	Shido BS		146.4	○		Sanuki	Kagawa
14	Sanuki-Miki IC	National Route 11 (Takamatsu-Higashi Bypass); Pref. Route 38 (Miki Mure Route)	149.5		Sakaide-bound exit, Naruto-bound entrance only	Miki	Kagawa
BS	Shishi-no-sato Miki BS		150.9	○		Miki	Kagawa
15	Takamatsu-Higashi IC	National Route 11 (Takamatsu-Higashi Bypass)	152.4		Naruto-bound exit, Sakaide-bound entrance only	Takamatsu	Kagawa
16	Takamatsu-Chūō IC	Pref. Route 43 (Chūtoku Mitani Takamatsu Route)	156.3	△		Takamatsu	Kagawa
17	Takamatsu-Danshi IC	National Route 11 (Takamatsu-Minami Bypass)	162.9		Sakaide-bound exit, Naruto-bound entrance only	Takamatsu	Kagawa
1	Takamatsu-Nishi IC	Pref. Route 12 (Miki Kokubunji Route)	165.4		Naruto-bound exit, Sakaide-bound entrance only	Takamatsu	Kagawa
1.000 mi = 1.609 km; 1.000 km = 0.621 mi: Incomplete access; Tolled

=== Takamatsu-Nishi IC - Kawanoe JCT ===
No.	Name	Connections	Dist. from Origin	Bus Stop	Notes	Location	
1	Takamatsu-Nishi IC	Pref. Route 12 (Miki Kokubunji Route)	0.0		Naruto-bound exit, Sakaide-bound entrance only	Takamatsu	Kagawa
1-1	Fuchūko PA/SIC		7.3			Sakaide	Kagawa
2	Sakaide JCT	for Seto-Chūō Expressway (Sakaide Route)	14.0			Sakaide	Kagawa
BS	Marugame BS		17.2	○		Marugame	Kagawa
3	Zentsuji IC	National Route 319	21.6	○		Zentsuji	Kagawa
3-1	Mitoyo-Tossaka IC	Pref. Route 220 (Ōmi Yoshizu Niō Route)	29.5		Kawanoe-bound exit, Sakaide-bound entrance only	Mitoyo	Kagawa
PA	Takase PA		32.2	◆		Mitoyo	Kagawa
4	Sanuki-Toyonaka IC	National Route 11	36.3			Mitoyo	Kagawa
BS	Kan'onji BS/SIC		40.8	○	Planned Smart Interchange	Kan'onji	Kagawa
5	Ōnohara IC	National Route 11	45.3			Kan'onji	Kagawa
SA	Toyohama SA		49.0; 49.5	◆	Sakaide-bound; Kawanoe-bound	Kan'onji	Kagawa
6	Kawanoe JCT	Matsuyama Expressway; Kōchi Expressway	56.8			Shikokuchūō	Ehime
Through to Matsuyama Expressway
1.000 mi = 1.609 km; 1.000 km = 0.621 mi: Incomplete access

=== Sakaide Route ===
No.	Name	Connections	Dist. from Origin	Bus Stop	Notes	Location (all in Kagawa)
Through to Seto-Chūō Expressway
TB	Sakaide TB		500.0		Sakaide-bound entrance only	Sakaide
5	Sakaide IC	National Route 11 (Sakaide-Marugame Bypass)	500.0	◆		Sakaide
2	Sakaide JTC	for Naruto, Shikokuchūō (Main Route)	502.0			Sakaide
Through to Matsuyama Expressway
1.000 mi = 1.609 km; 1.000 km = 0.621 mi: Tolled

- To prevent confusion with the main route, kilometer markers along the Sakaide Route show the distance from Sakaide Junction plus 500 (the marker at Sakaide Interchange is 500.0 while the marker at Sakaide Junction is 502.0).
