= Japan National Route 193 =

Road in Japan

National Route 193
- 国道193号
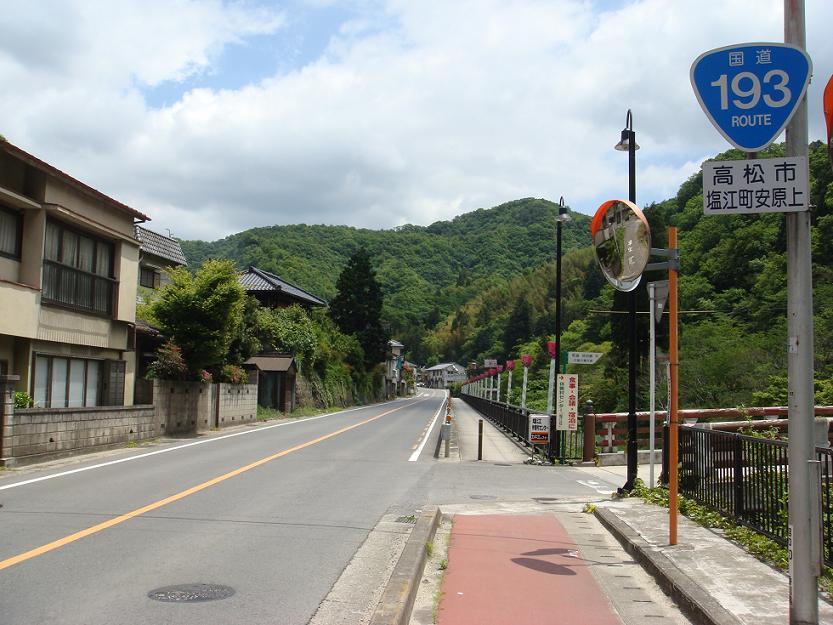

Route information
- Length: 155.7 km (96.7 mi)
- Existed: 18 May 1953–present

Major junctions
- North end: National Route 11 / National Route 32 in Takamatsu
- South end: National Route 55 in Kaiyō

Location
- Country: Japan

Highway system
- National highways of Japan; Expressways of Japan
← National Route 192	→ National Route 194

National Route 193 is a national highway of Japan connecting Takamatsu and Kaiyō in Japan, with a total length of 155.7 km (96.75 mi).
