= Japan National Route 33 =

National highway in Japan

National Route 33
- 国道33号

Route information
- Length: 122.9 km (76.4 mi)
- Existed: 4 December 1952–present

Major junctions
- North end: National Route 56 in Matsuyama
- South end: National Route 32 / National Route 56 / National Route 195 in Kōchi

Location
- Country: Japan

Highway system
- National highways of Japan; Expressways of Japan
← National Route 32	→ National Route 34

National Route 33 (国道33号, Kokudō Sanjūsan-gō), also known as the Tosa Kaidō, is a Japanese highway on the island of Shikoku. It originates at the intersection of Route 32 and other arteries in the city of Kōchi (capital of Kōchi Prefecture) and terminates in the city of Matsuyama (capital of Ehime Prefecture), where it meets Route 11 and other national highways. Its history dates to the year 662.

== Route data ==
- Length: 122.9 km (76.4 mi)
- Origin: Kōchi (originates at the terminus of Routes 32 and 55 and the origin of Routes 55, 194, 195, 197 and 493)
- Terminus: Matsuyama (ends at the terminus of Routes 11 and 56)
- Major cities: Niyodogawa, Kumakōgen

== History ==
- 1952-12-04 - First Class National Highway 33 (from Kōchi to Matsuyama)
- 1965-04-01 - General National Highway 33 (from Kōchi to Matsuyama)
