= Japan National Route 28 =

National highway in Japan

National Route 28
- 国道28号

Route information
- Length: 85.7 km (53.3 mi)
- Existed: 4 December 1952–present

Major junctions
- South end: Hyogo Prefectural Route 21 in Chūō-ku, Kobe
- North end: National Route 11 / National Route 55 in Tokushima

Location
- Country: Japan

Highway system
- National highways of Japan; Expressways of Japan
← National Route 27	→ National Route 29

National Route 28 (国道28号, Kokudō nijūhachi-gō) is a national highway connecting Kobe and Tokushima in Japan. It is the only national highway that traverses Awaji Island as the route uses ferries to connect the two cities of Naruto, Tokushima and Akashi, Hyōgo.

== Route data ==
- Length: 85.7 km (53.5 mi)
- Origin: Chuo-ku, Kobe
- Terminus: Tokushima (ends at the origin of Routes 11 and 55)
- Major cities: Akashi, Awaji, Sumoto, Minamiawaji, Naruto

== History ==
- 4 December 1952 - First Class National Highway 28 (from Kobe to Tokushima)
- 1 April 1965 - General National Highway 28 (from Kobe to Tokushima)

== Intersects with ==
- Hyogo Prefecture
- Tokushima Prefecture
