= Shikoku =

Island and region of Japan

Native name: 四国
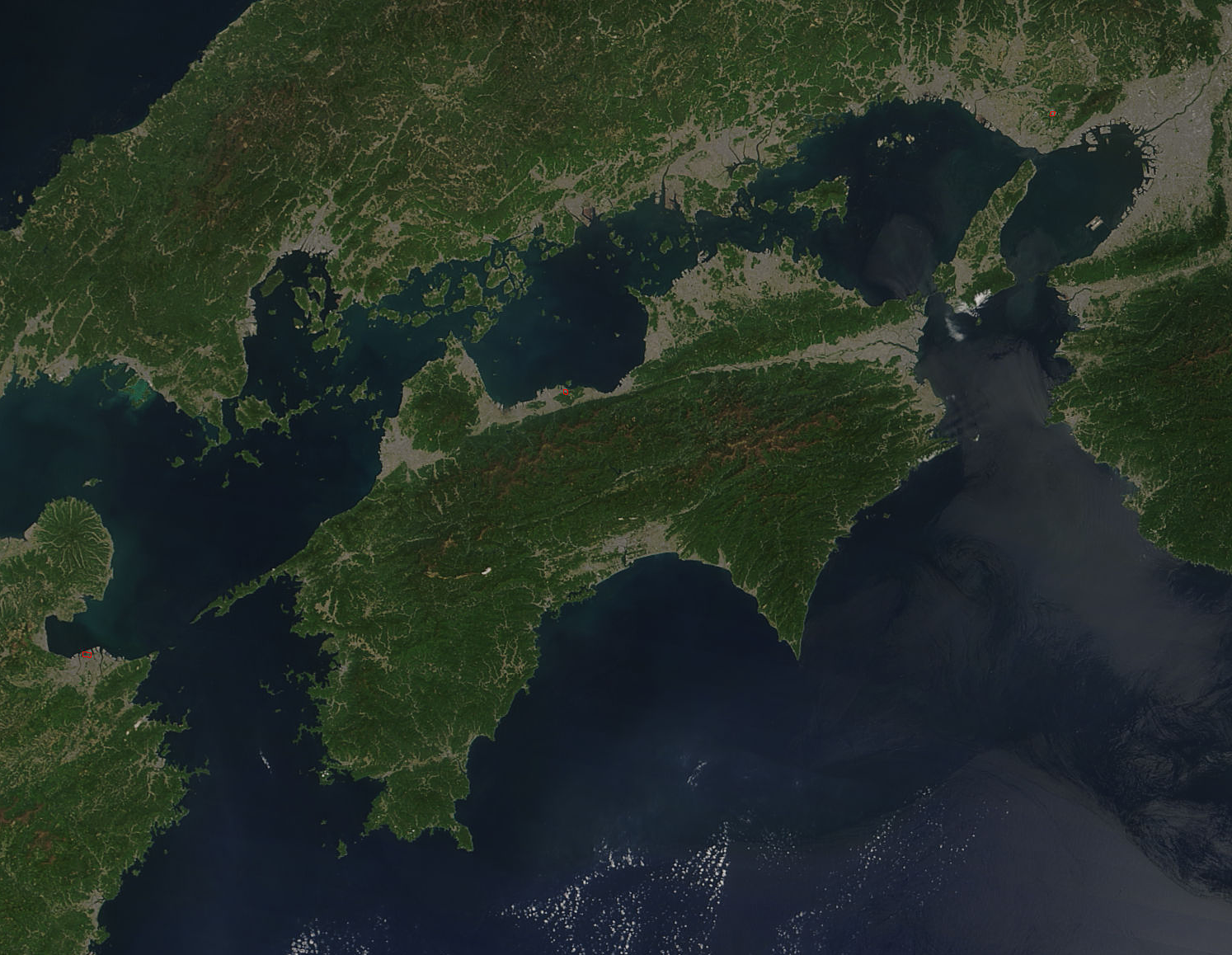
- The island of Shikoku, Japan

Geography
- Location: Southwest Japan
- Coordinates: 33°45′N 133°30′E
- Archipelago: Japanese archipelago
- Adjacent to: Seto Inland Sea (north); Bungo Channel (west); Kii Channel (east); Pacific Ocean (south)
- Area: 18,801.73 km^{2} (7,259.39 sq mi)
- Area rank: 50th
- Length: 225 km (139.8 mi)
- Width: 50–150 km (31–93 mi)
- Highest elevation: 1,982 m (6503 ft)
- Highest point: Mount Ishizuchi

Administration
- Japan
- Prefectures: Ehime; Kagawa; Kōchi; Tokushima
- Largest settlement: Matsuyama (pop. 507,137 (as of 1 May 2022))

Demographics
- Population: 3,486,739 (1 October 2025)
- Population rank: 23rd
- Pop. density: 185/km^{2} (479/sq mi)
- Languages: Japanese (Western Japanese — Awa, Tosa, Iyo and Sanuki dialects); Japanese Sign
- Ethnic groups: Japanese (98%)

Additional information
- Time zone: Japan Standard Time (UTC+9)

Shikoku (四国, Shikoku; pronounced [ɕi̥.kó̞.kɯ̈̀, -kò̞-], lit. 'four provinces') is the smallest of the four main islands of Japan. It is 225 kilometres (140 miles) long and between 50 and 150 kilometres (30 and 95 miles) wide. It has a population of 3.4 million, the least of Japan's four main islands. It is south of Honshu and northeast of Kyushu. Shikoku's ancient names include Iyo-no-futana-shima (伊予之二名島), Iyo-shima (伊予島), and Futana-shima (二名島), and its current name refers to the four former provinces that make up the island: Awa, Tosa, Sanuki, and Iyo.

== Geography ==
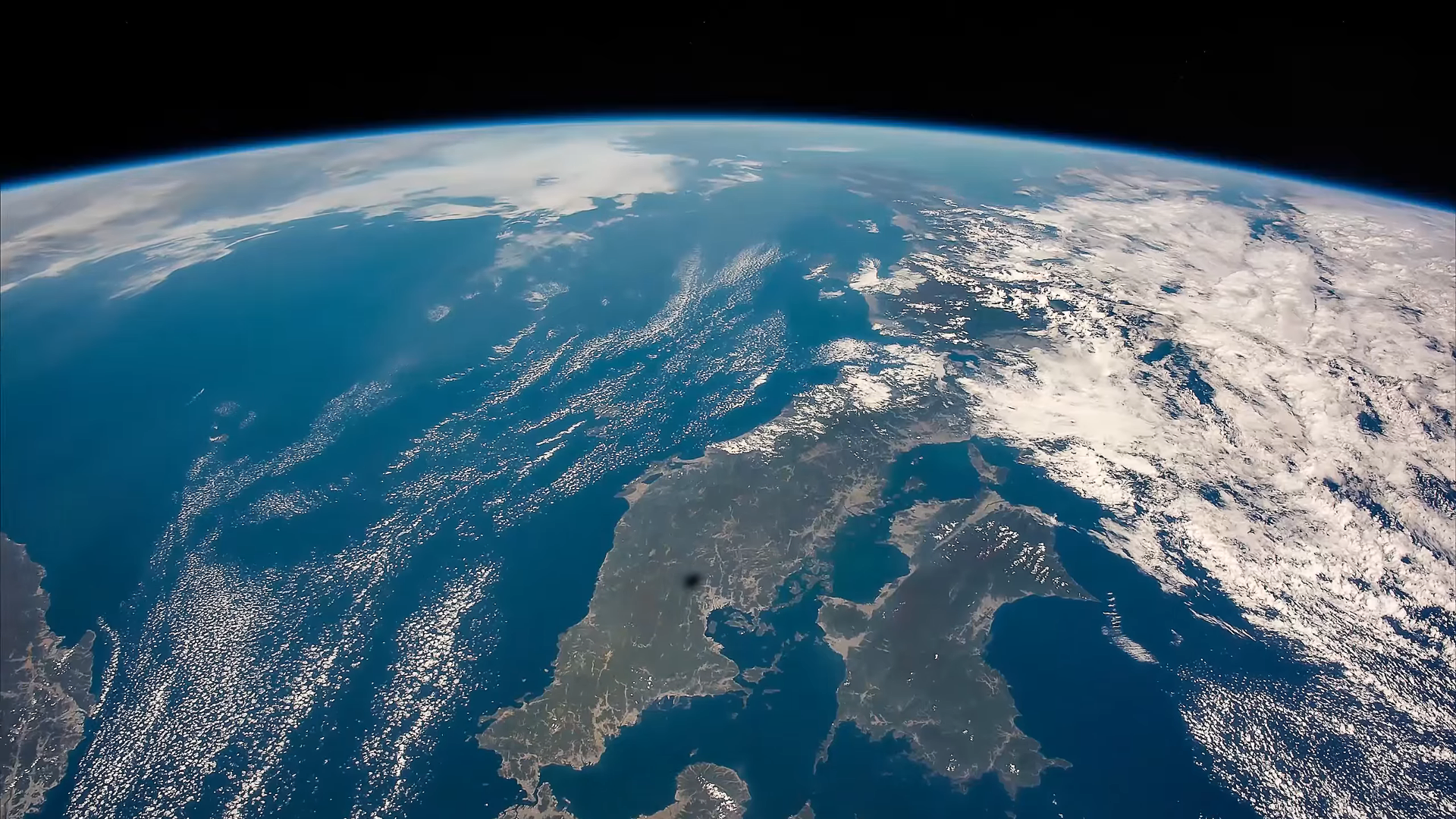
Chūgoku region and Shikoku seen from the International Space Station

Shikoku Island, comprising Shikoku and its surrounding islands, covers about 18,800 square kilometres (7,259 sq mi) and consists of four prefectures: Ehime, Kagawa, Kōchi, and Tokushima. Across the Seto Inland Sea lie Wakayama, Osaka, Hyōgo, Okayama, Hiroshima, and Yamaguchi Prefectures on Honshu. To the west lie Ōita and Miyazaki Prefectures on Kyushu.

Geofeatures map of Shikoku

Shikoku is ranked as the 50th largest island by area in the world. Additionally, it is ranked as the 23rd most populated island in the world, with a population density of 193 inhabitants per square kilometre (500/sq mi).

Mountains running east and west divide Shikoku into a narrow northern subregion, fronting on the Seto Inland Sea, and a southern part facing the Pacific Ocean. The Hydrangea hirta species can be found in these mountain ranges. Most of the 3.8 million inhabitants live in the north, and all but one of the island's few larger cities are located there. Mount Ishizuchi (石鎚山) in Ehime at 1,982 m (6,503 ft) is the highest mountain on the island. Industry is moderately well developed and includes the processing of ores from the important Besshi copper mine. Land is used intensively. Wide alluvial areas, especially in the eastern part of the zone, are planted with rice and subsequently are double-cropped with winter wheat and barley. Fruit is grown throughout the northern area in great variety, including citrus fruits, persimmons, peaches, and grapes. Because of wheat production, Sanuki udon (讃岐うどん) became an important part of the diet in Kagawa Prefecture (formerly Sanuki Province) in the Edo period.

The larger southern area of Shikoku is mountainous and sparsely populated. The only significant lowland is a small alluvial plain at Kōchi, the prefectural capital. The area's mild winters stimulated some truck farming, specializing in growing out-of-season vegetables under plastic covering. Two crops of rice can be cultivated annually in the southern area. The pulp and paper industry took advantage of the abundant forests and hydroelectric power.

The major river in Shikoku is the Yoshino River. It runs 196 km (121.8 mi) from its source close to Mount Ishizuchi, flowing basically west to east across the northern boundaries of Kōchi and Tokushima Prefectures, reaching the sea at the city of Tokushima. The Yoshino is famous for Japan's best white-water rafting, with trips going along the Oboke Koboke sections of the river.

Shikoku has four important capes: Gamōda in Anan, Tokushima on the easternmost point on the island, Sada in Ikata, Ehime on the westernmost point. Muroto in Muroto, Kōchi and Ashizuri, the southern extreme of Shikoku, in Tosashimizu, Kōchi, jut into the Pacific Ocean. The island's northernmost point is in Takamatsu.

Unlike the other three major islands of Japan, Shikoku has no active volcanoes, and is the largest of Japan's islands to completely lack them. But Shikoku did experience volcanic activity in the distant prehistoric past; a major volcanic caldera in the area of Mount Ishizuchi was active during the Miocene around 14 million years ago and the small volcanic cone of Mount Iino at an unknown date.

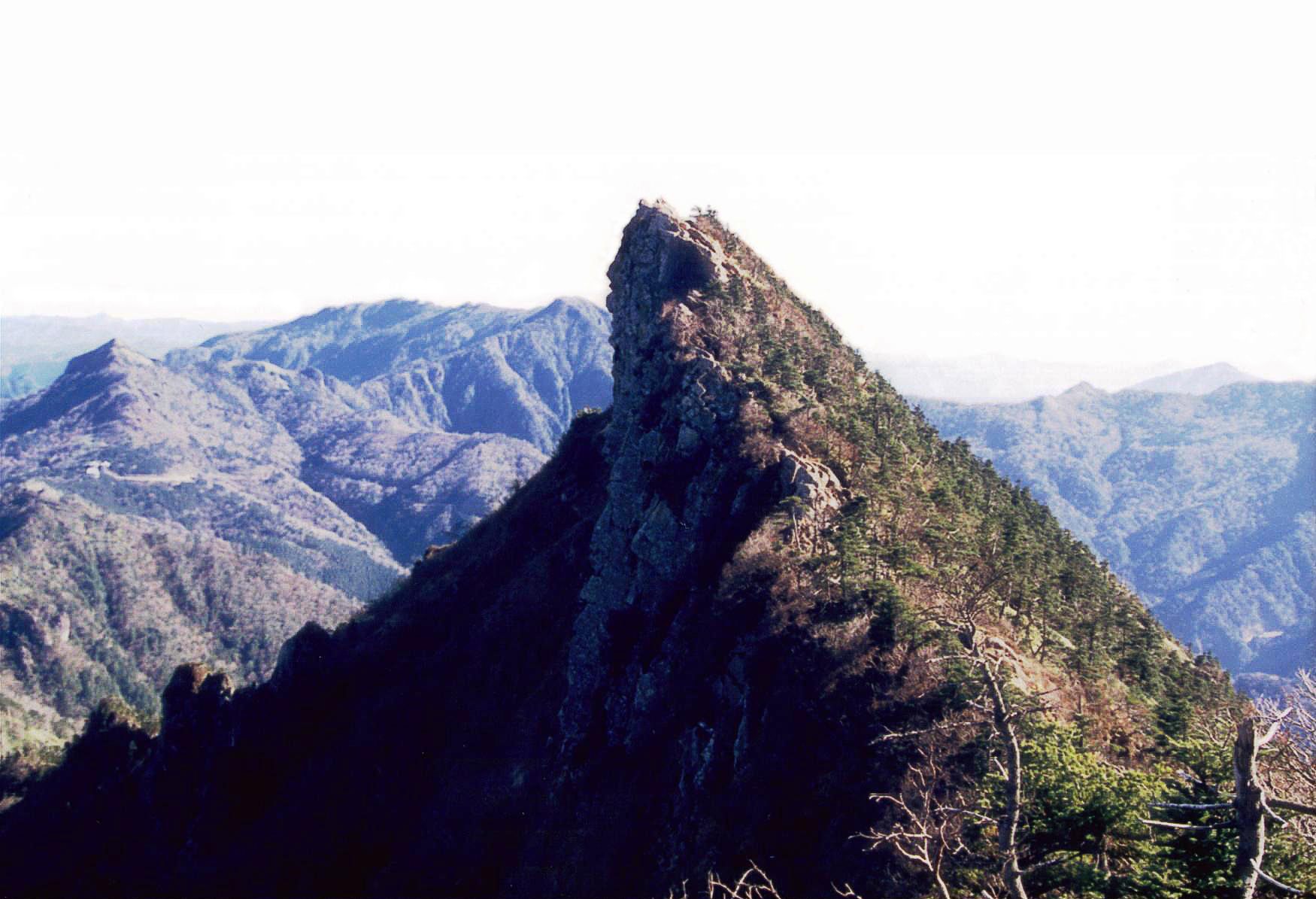
Mount Ishizuchi is the highest mountain in Shikoku.

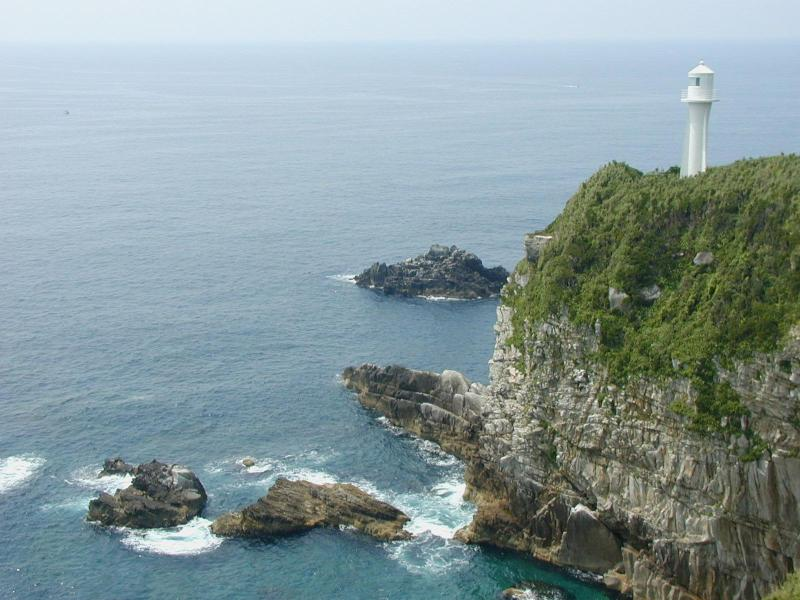
Cape Ashizuri is at the southernmost tip of Shikoku.

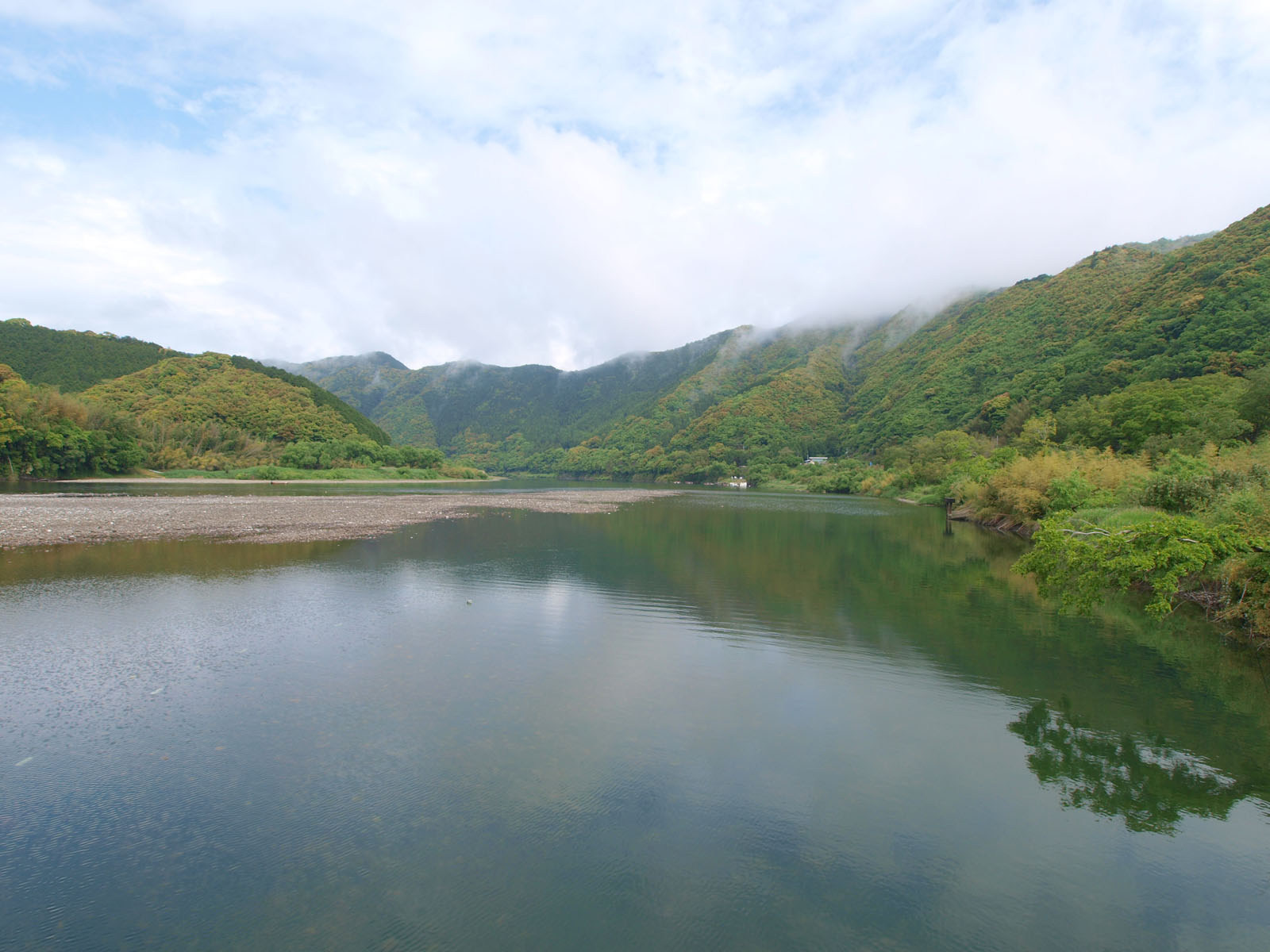
Shimanto River

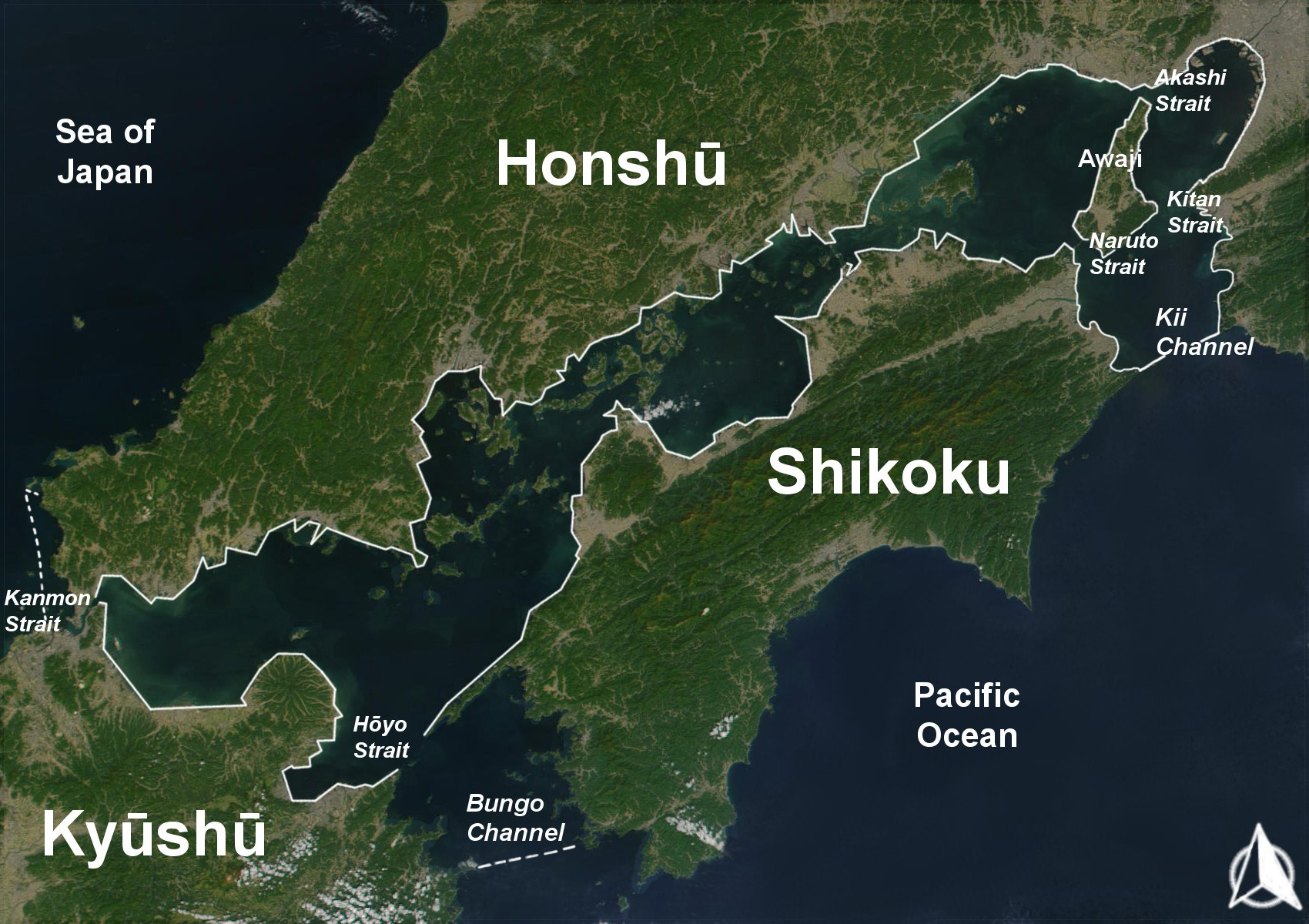
Seto Inland Sea

== Population ==
Shikoku had a total population of 3,486,739 in 2025. The largest city is Matsuyama (population: 507,137) and is the capital of Ehime Prefecture. Shikoku is the main island with the third largest population density, at 193 inhabitants per square kilometre (500/sq mi).

List of 20 major cities in Shikoku
Rank	Cities	Prefecture	Population
1	Matsuyama	Ehime	507,137
2	Takamatsu	Kagawa	414,363
3	Kōchi	Kōchi	321,910
4	Tokushima	Tokushima	250,150
5	Imabari	Ehime	147,334
6	Niihama	Ehime	113,755
7	Marugame	Kagawa	108,744
8	Saijō	Ehime	102,830
9	Shikokuchūō	Ehime	80,952
10	Uwajima	Ehime	68,213
11	Anan	Tokushima	67,891
12	Mitoyo	Kagawa	60,106
13	Kan'onji	Kagawa	56,258
14	Naruto	Tokushima	53,368
15	Sakaide	Kagawa	49,487
16	Sanuki	Kagawa	45,763
17	Nankoku	Kōchi	46,176
18	Ōzu	Ehime	39,352
19	Yoshinogawa	Tokushima	37,707
20	Komatsushima	Tokushima	35,288

Capital cities of four prefectures of Shikoku
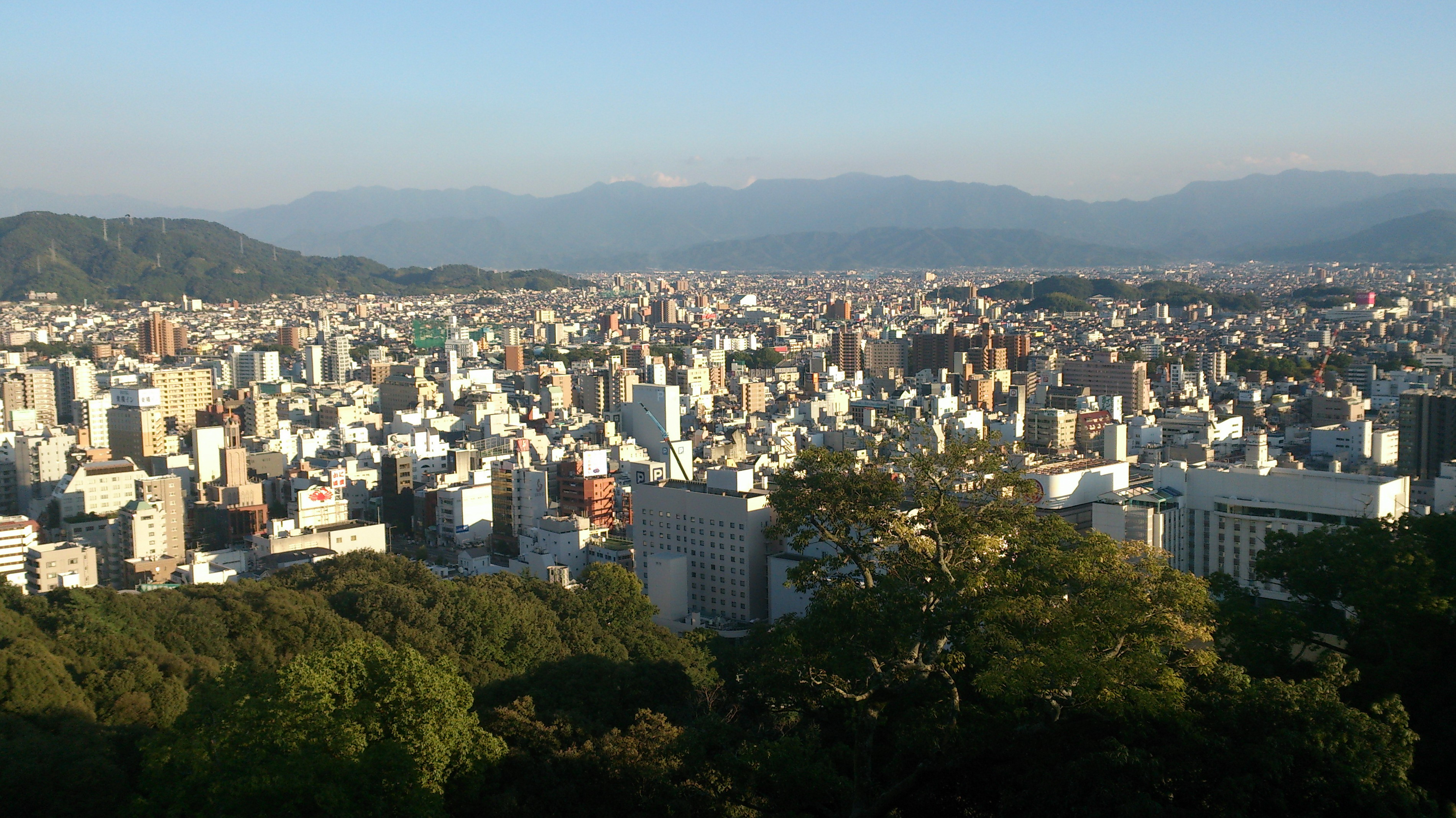
Matsuyama City

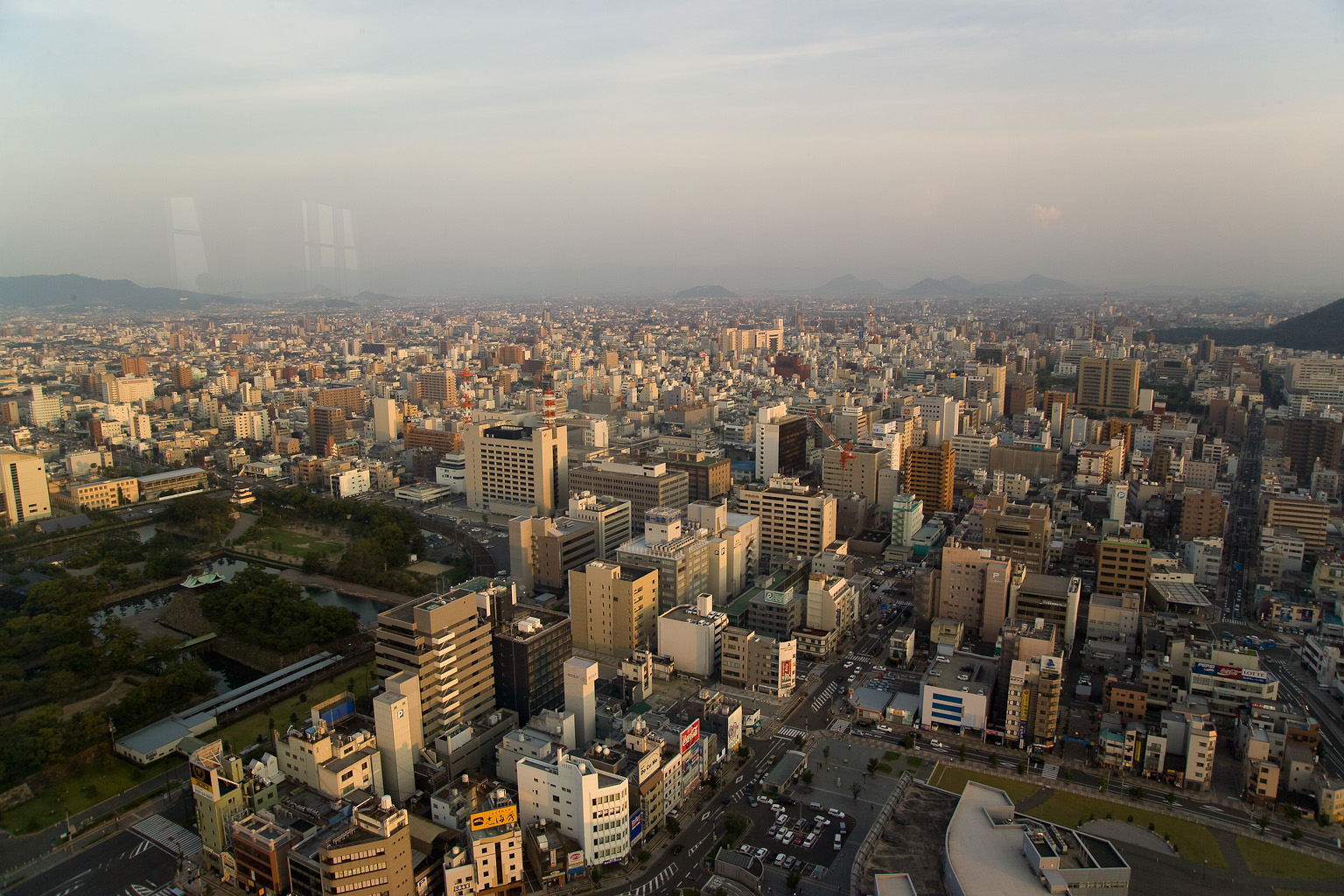
Takamatsu City

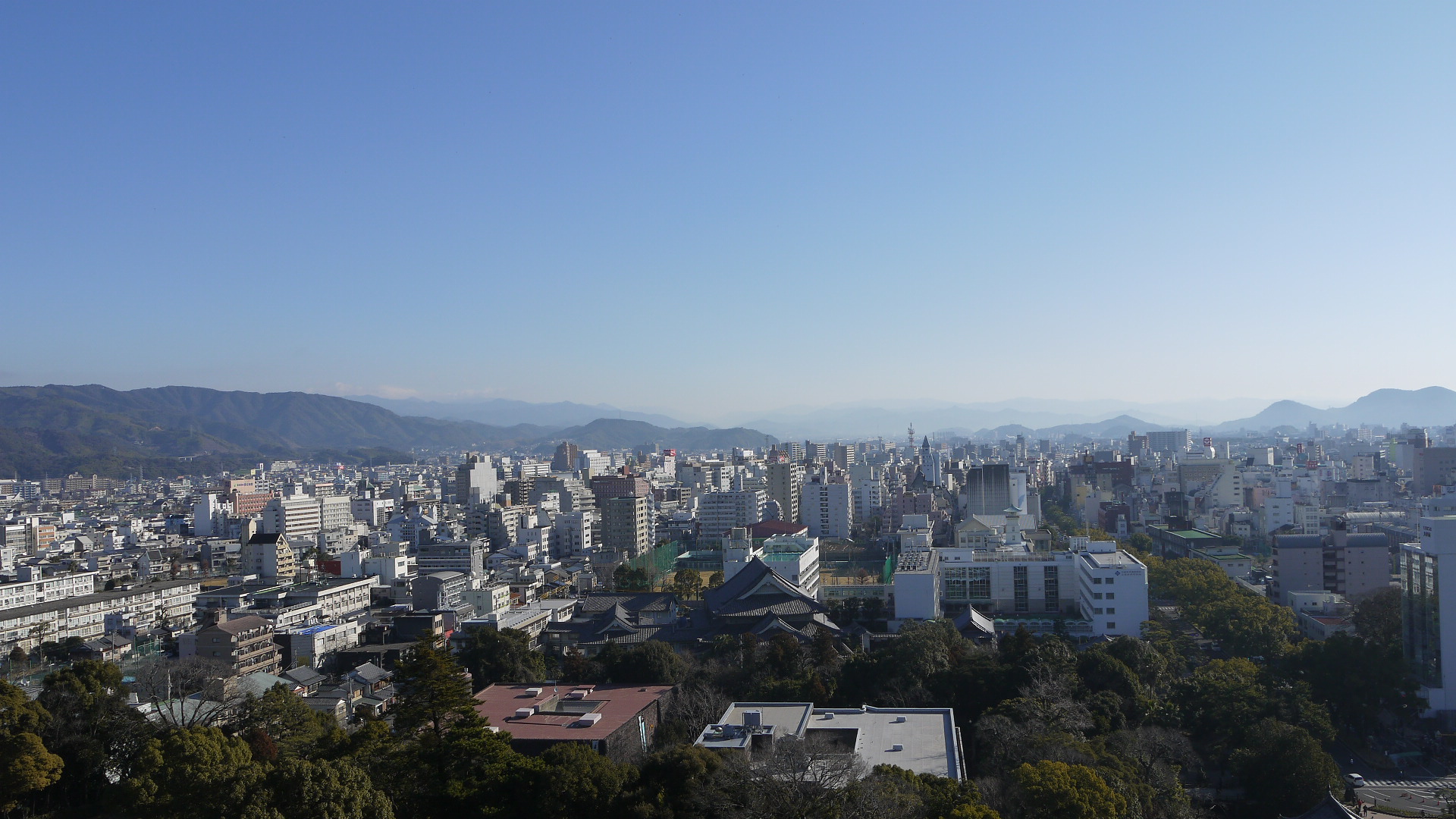
Kōchi City

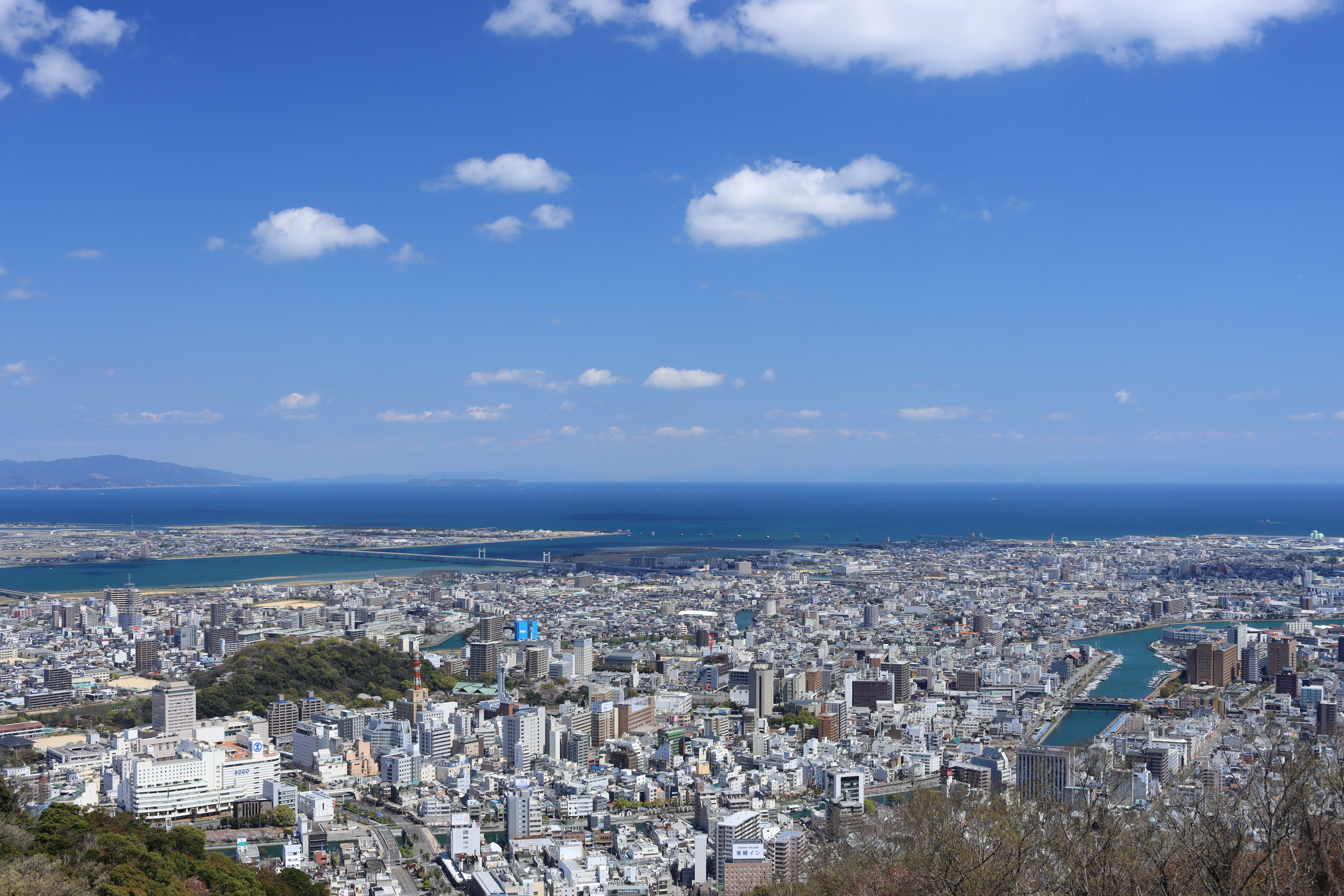
Tokushima City

Per Japanese census data, and, Shikoku region's peak population was at 1953 and has had negative population growth from 1950 to 1970 and 1990 onward.

Historical population
Year	Pop.	±%
1920	3,066,000	—
1930	3,310,000	+8.0%
1940	3,337,000	+0.8%
1950	4,221,000	+26.5%
1960	4,122,000	−2.3%
1970	3,904,000	−5.3%
1980	4,163,000	+6.6%
1990	4,195,000	+0.8%
2000	4,154,039	−1.0%
2010	3,977,282	−4.3%
2020	3,696,171	−7.1%

== Sightseeing ==
- Ehime Prefecture: Matsuyama, Imahari, Saijō, Shikokuchūō, Uwajima, Ōzu, Seiyo, Iyo, Tōon, Yawatahama
- Kagawa Prefecture: Takamatsu, Marugame, Kan'onji, Sakaide, Sanuki, Zentsūji,
- Kōchi Prefecture: Nankoku, Shimanto, Kōnan, Tosa, Kami, Susaki, Sukumo, Aki, Tosashimizu, Muroto
- Tokushima Prefecture: Anan, Naruto, Yoshinogawa, Komatsushima, Awa, Mima, Miyoshi

== Culture ==
=== Society and architecture ===
Shikoku has historically been quite isolated and therefore it has kept the original characteristics of Japan for a longer period, especially in regards to vegetation and some architectural techniques. There are many Buddhist temples.

The "lost" Shikoku has been described by an American writer, Alex Kerr, who lived in a remote mountain village near Oboke (大歩危) for many years from 1970 onwards.

Ashizuri-Uwakai National Park is located in the south-west part of Shikoku.

=== Traditions ===
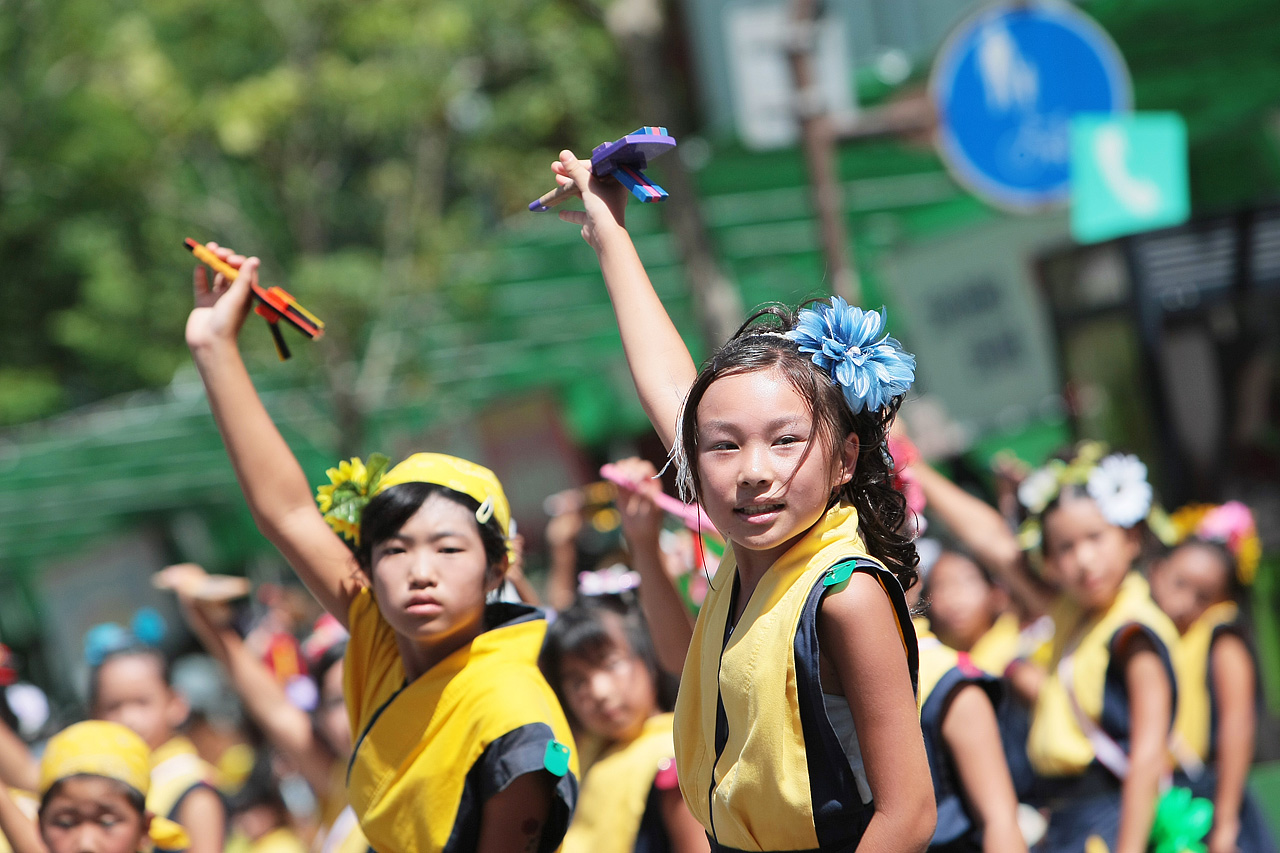
Yosakoi festival

Shikoku is also famous for its 88-temple pilgrimage of temples. The pilgrimage was established by the Heian-period Buddhist priest Kūkai, a native of present-day Zentsūji-cho in Kagawa prefecture. According to legend, Kūkai still appears to pilgrims today. Most modern-day pilgrims travel by bus, rarely choosing the old-fashioned method of going by foot. They are seen wearing white jackets emblazoned with the characters reading dōgyō ninin (同行二人) meaning "two traveling together".

Tokushima Prefecture also has its annual Awa Odori running in August at the time of the Obon festival, which attracts thousands of tourists each year from all over Japan and from abroad.

Kōchi Prefecture is home to the first annual Yosakoi festival. The largest festival in Kōchi, it takes place in August every year and attracts dancers and tourists from all over Japan.

=== Food ===
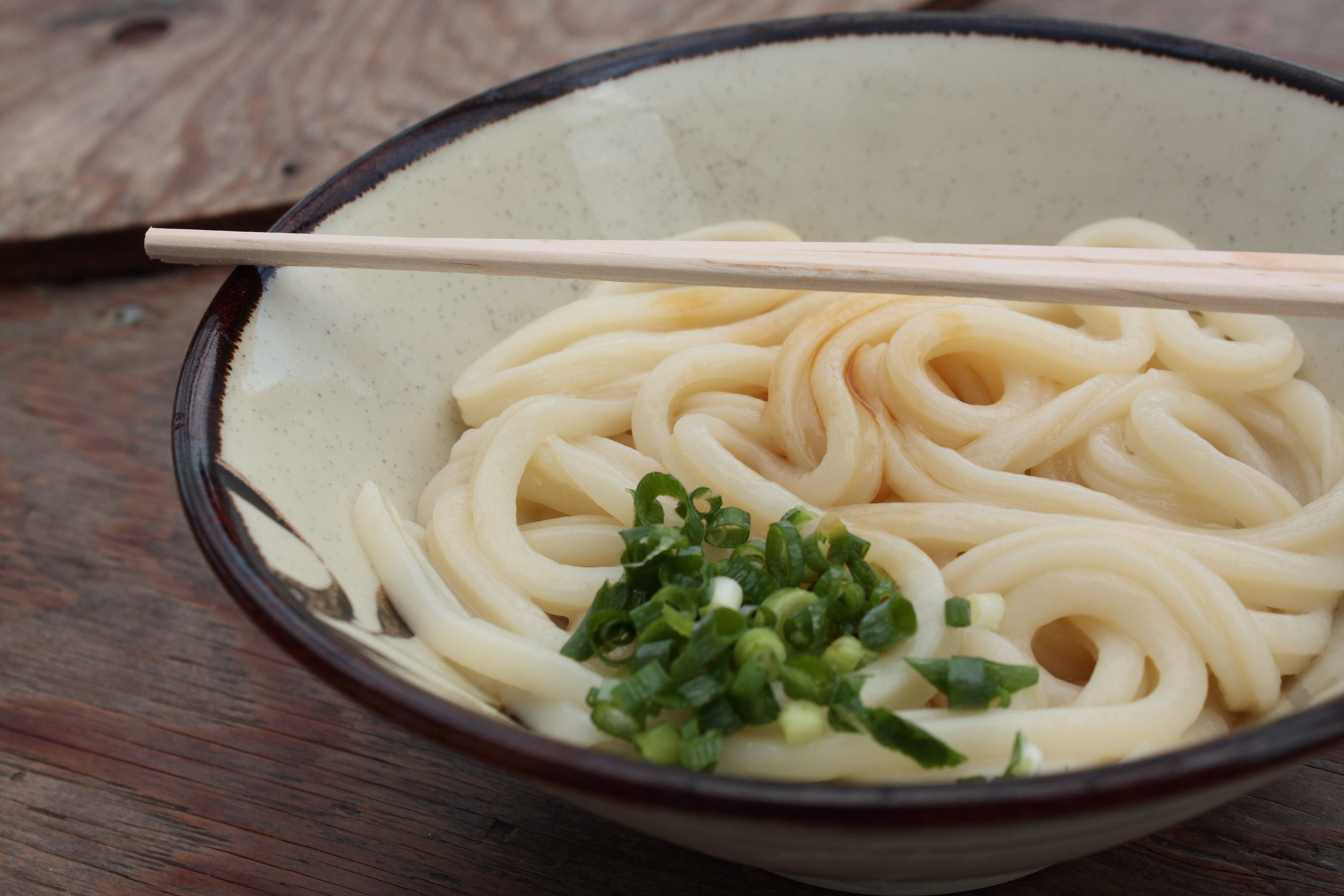
Sanuki udon

One of the major foods of Shikoku is udon. Udon is often served hot as a noodle soup in its simplest form, as kake udon, in a mildly flavoured broth called kakejiru, which is made of dashi, soy sauce (shōyu), and mirin. It is usually topped with thinly chopped scallions. Other common toppings include tempura, often prawn or kakiage (a type of mixed tempura fritter), or aburaage, a type of deep-fried tofu pockets seasoned with sugar, mirin, and soy sauce. A thin slice of kamaboko, a halfmoon-shaped fish cake, is often added. Shichimi can be added to taste. Another specialty is Kōchi's signature dish, seared bonito.

The warm climate of Shikoku lends itself to the cultivation of citrus fruits. As a result, yuzu, mikan and other citrus fruits are plentiful on Shikoku and have become synonymous with the regions they are grown in.

=== Movements ===
Pioneering natural farmer Masanobu Fukuoka, author of The One-Straw Revolution, developed his methods here on his family's farm.

=== Sports ===
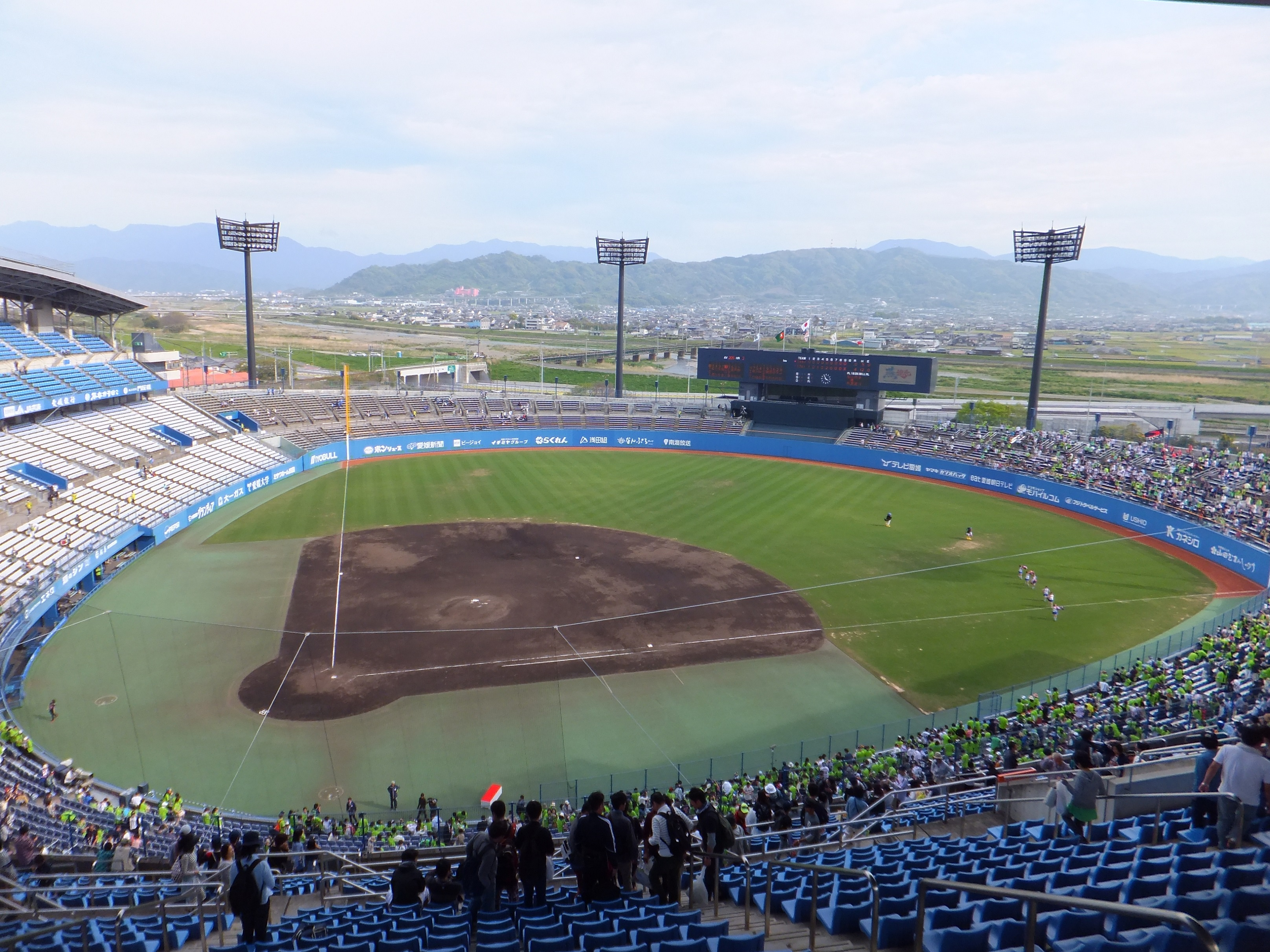
Shikoku Island League Plus (Ehime Mandarin Pirates)

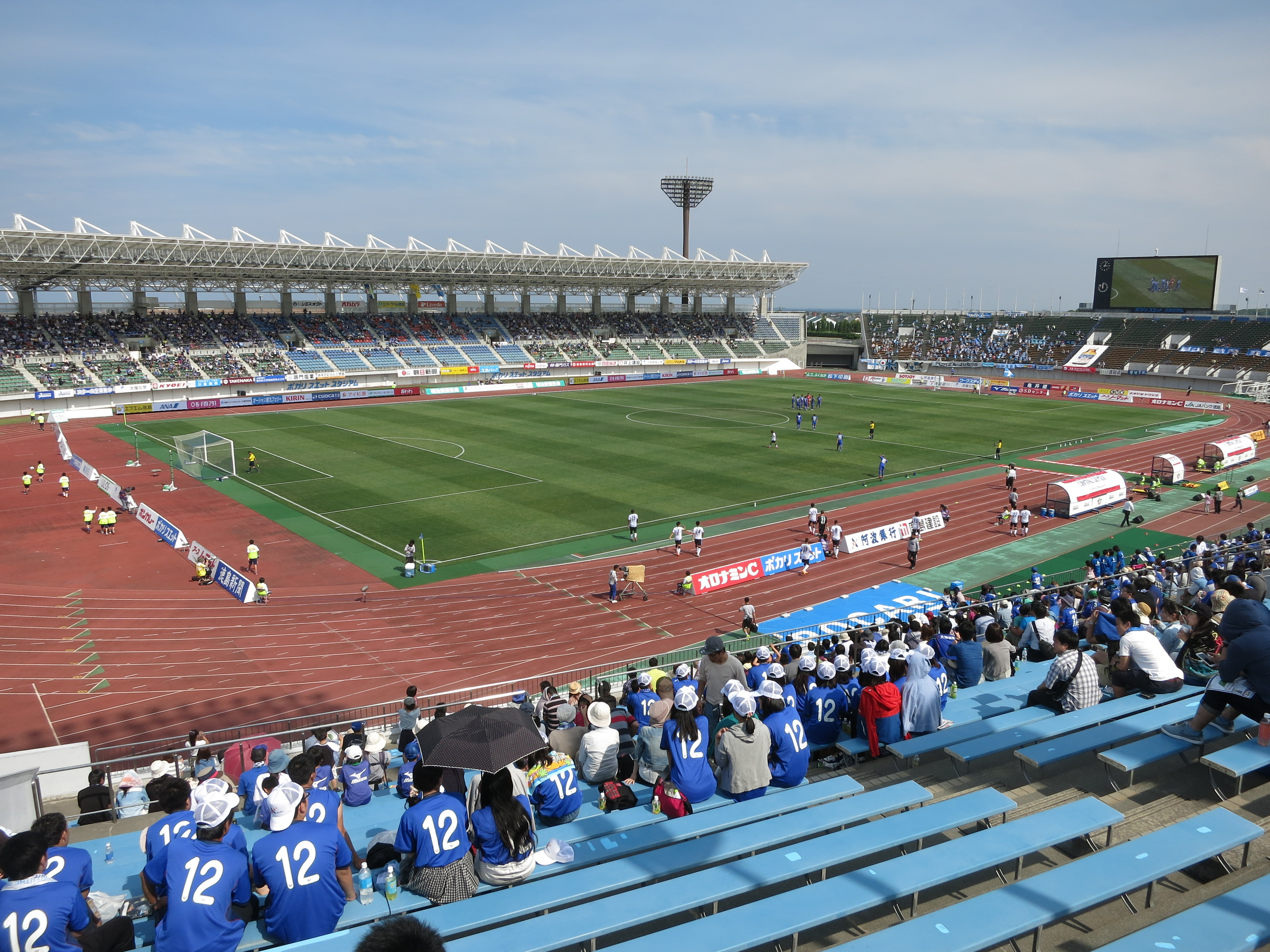
J. League (Tokushima Vortis)

Historically no Shikoku-based sports team has competed in the top Japanese division of baseball, football (soccer) or even rugby union. However, Tokushima Vortis have had two spells in the top flight of Japanese soccer (J1) in 2014 and 2021. Currently the major teams competing in Shikoku's major cities include:

- Naruto, Tokushima:
  - Tokushima Vortis (football, J2)
  - Tokushima Indigo Socks (baseball, SKIL)
- Matsuyama, Ehime
  - Ehime FC (football, J2)
  - Ehime Mandarin Pirates (baseball, SKIL)
- Imabari, Ehime:
  - FC Imabari (football, J2)
- Takamatsu, Kagawa:
  - Kamatamare Sanuki (football, J3)
  - Kagawa Olive Guyners (baseball, SKIL)
- Kōchi, Kōchi:
  - Kōchi United SC (football, J3)
  - Kōchi Fighting Dogs (baseball, SKIL)

=== Notable sportspeople ===
Two time darts Women's World Champion Mikuru Suzuki is a native of Takamatsu in Kagawa Prefecture on Shikoku.

== Transportation ==
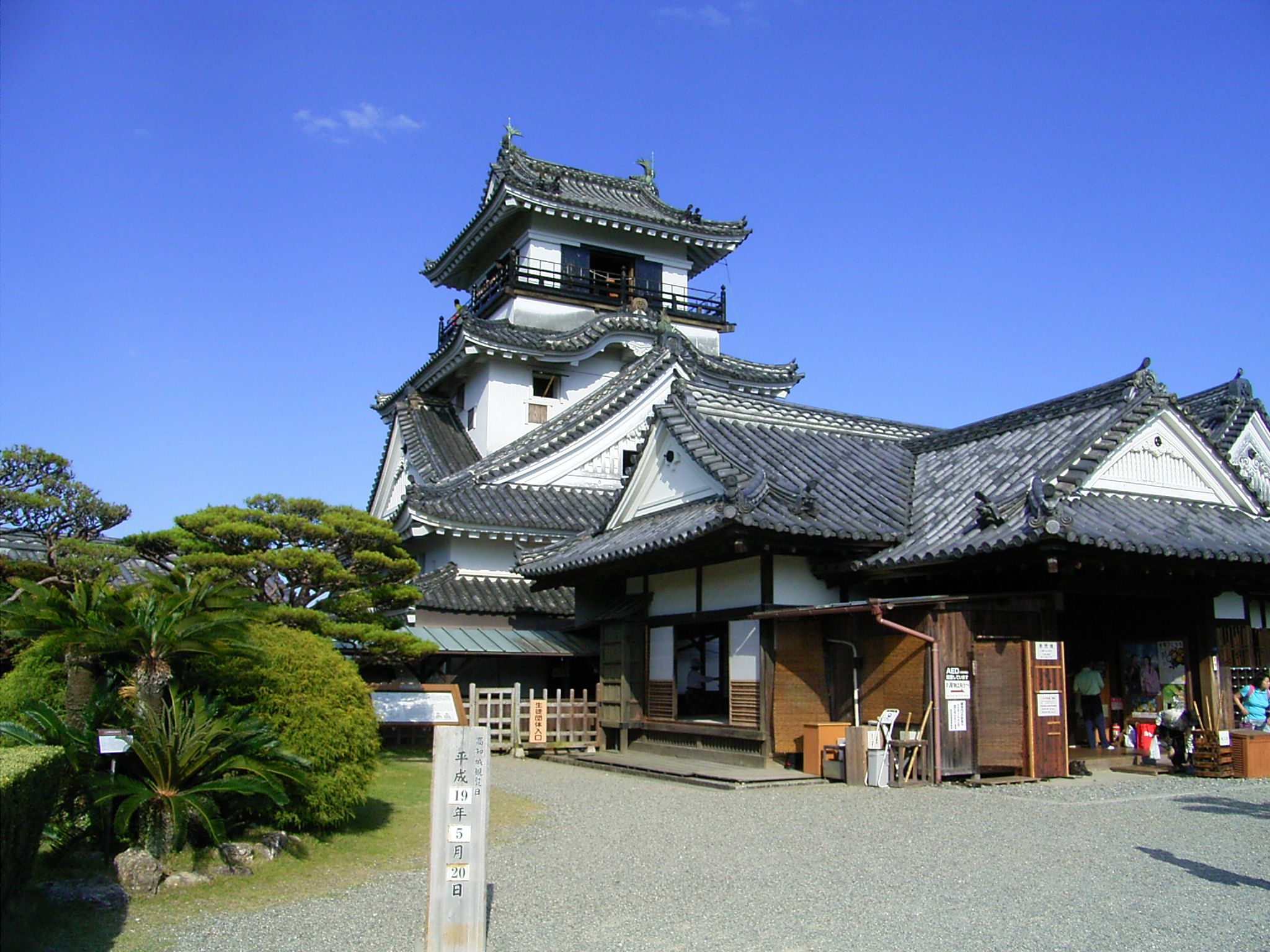
Kōchi Castle

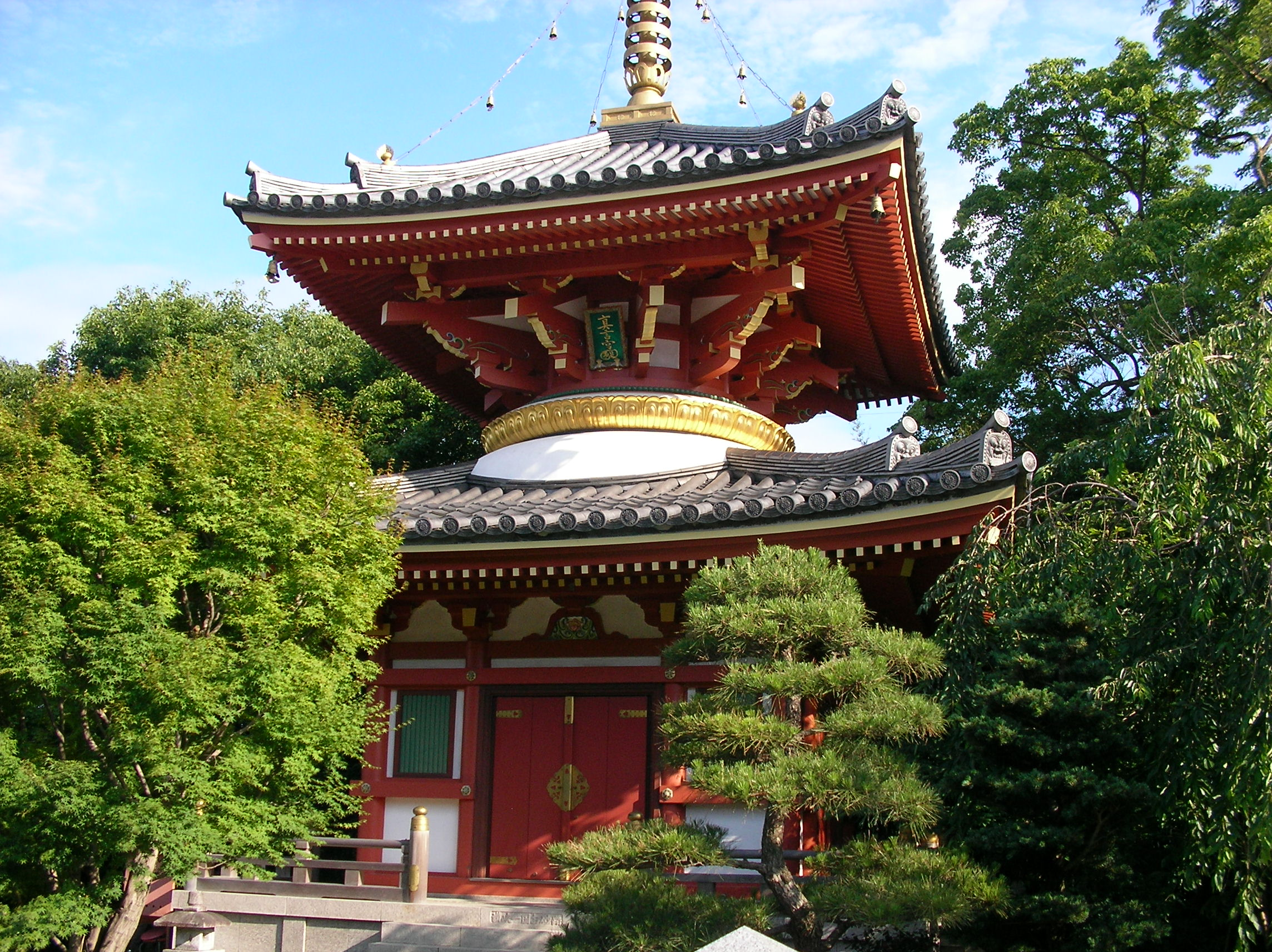
Anraku-ji in Kamiita, Tokushima

=== Roads ===
Shikoku is connected to Honshu by three expressways, which together form the Honshū–Shikoku Bridge Project.

- Kobe-Awaji-Naruto Expressway (Eastern Shikoku)
- Nishiseto Expressway (Western Shikoku)
- Seto-Chūō Expressway (Central Shikoku)

The eastern gateway to Shikoku, Naruto in Tokushima Prefecture has been linked to the Kobe-Awaji-Naruto Expressway since 1998. This line connects Shikoku to the Kansai area which has a large population, including the large conurbations of Osaka, Kyoto, and Kobe. Therefore, the Kobe-Awaji-Naruto Expressway carries a large traffic volume. Many highway buses are operated between Kansai and Tokushima Prefecture.

The central part of Shikoku is connected to Honshu by ferry, air, and – since 1988 – by the Great Seto Bridge network. Until completion of the bridges, the region was isolated from the rest of Japan. The freer movement between Honshu and Shikoku was expected to promote economic development on both sides of the bridges, which has not materialized yet.

Within the island, a web of expressways and national highways connects the major population centers. These include Kōchi Expressway, Matsuyama Expressway, Takamatsu Expressway, Tokushima Expressway, Routes 11, 32, 33, 55, and 56.

=== Rail ===
The Shikoku Railway Company (JR Shikoku) serves the island and connects to Honshu via the Great Seto Bridge. JR lines include:

- Dosan Line
- Honshi Bisan Line
- Kōtoku Line
- Mugi Line
- Naruto Line
- Seto Ōhashi Line
- Tokushima Line
- Uchiko Line
- Yodo Line
- Yosan Line

Private railway lines operate in each of the four prefectures on Shikoku.

=== Air travel ===
Shikoku lacks a full international airport but has four regional/domestic airports (Tokushima Airport, Takamatsu Airport, Kōchi Ryōma Airport and Matsuyama Airport). All of these airports have flights to Tokyo and other major Japanese cities such as Osaka, Nagoya, Sapporo, and Fukuoka. International flights to Seoul, South Korea, are serviced by Asiana Airlines from Matsuyama and Takamatsu. There are periodic international charter flights as well.

Sea Travel

Ferries link Shikoku to destinations including Honshu, Kyushu, and islands around Shikoku.

== See also ==
- Geography of Japan
- Japanese archipelago
- Regions of Japan
- Shikoku dialect
- Invasion of Shikoku (1585)
