= Japan National Route 494 =

Road in Japan

National Route 494
- 国道494号

Location
- Country: Japan

Highway system
- National highways of Japan; Expressways of Japan
← National Route 493	→ National Route 495

National Route 494 is a national highway of Japan connecting between Matsuyama, Ehime and Susaki, Kōchi on the island of Shikoku, with a total length of 120.7 km (74.83 mi). of Japan .
