= 11E =

11E, 11e or eleven E may refer to:

- 11th meridian east
- GCR Class 11E, a class of British 4-4-0 steam locomotive
- Kepler-11e, an exoplanet orbiting the star Kepler-11
- South African Class 11E, a class of Co-Co electric locomotive
- Tropical Depression Eleven-E (2010), a weather system which developed into Tropical Storm Hermine
- U.S. Route 11E, a highway connecting Knoxville, Tennessee with Bristol, Virginia
- 11 East Forsyth or 11 E, a historic building in Jacksonville, Florida

== See also ==
- E11 (disambiguation)
