= Tokushima-Nanbu Expressway =

Expressway in Tokushima Prefecture, Japan

- 徳島南部自動車道

Route information
- Length: 22.4 km (13.9 mi)
- Existed: 2021–present

Major junctions
- From: Anan, Tokushima (Anan Interchange)
- To: Tokushima, Tokushima (Tokushima Junction)

Location
- Country: Japan

Highway system
- National highways of Japan; Expressways of Japan

The Tokushima-Nanbu Expressway (徳島南部自動車道, Tokushima-Nanbu Jidōsha-dō) is an expressway that runs from Anan in Tokushima Prefecture to Tokushima via Komatsushima. It is connected to the Anan Aki Expressway in Anan and to the Tokushima Expressway in Tokushima. Anan Interchange-Tokushima Okishu Interchange is under new direct control.

The name of the National Land Development Trunk Road (National Trunk Road) is part of the Shikoku Crossing Expressway (Shikoku-Ōdan Expressway), which constitutes the starting point of the line.

The name of the city planning road is Tokushima Expressway Tokushima Junction (under construction) - Together with Naruto Junction, it is the Tokushima eastern city planning road Anan Naruto Line.

The route number according to the expressway numbering is assigned E55 together with the Anan Aki Expressway and the Kōchi-Tōbu Expressway.
