= Tosa Kaidō =

Ancient trade route in Japan

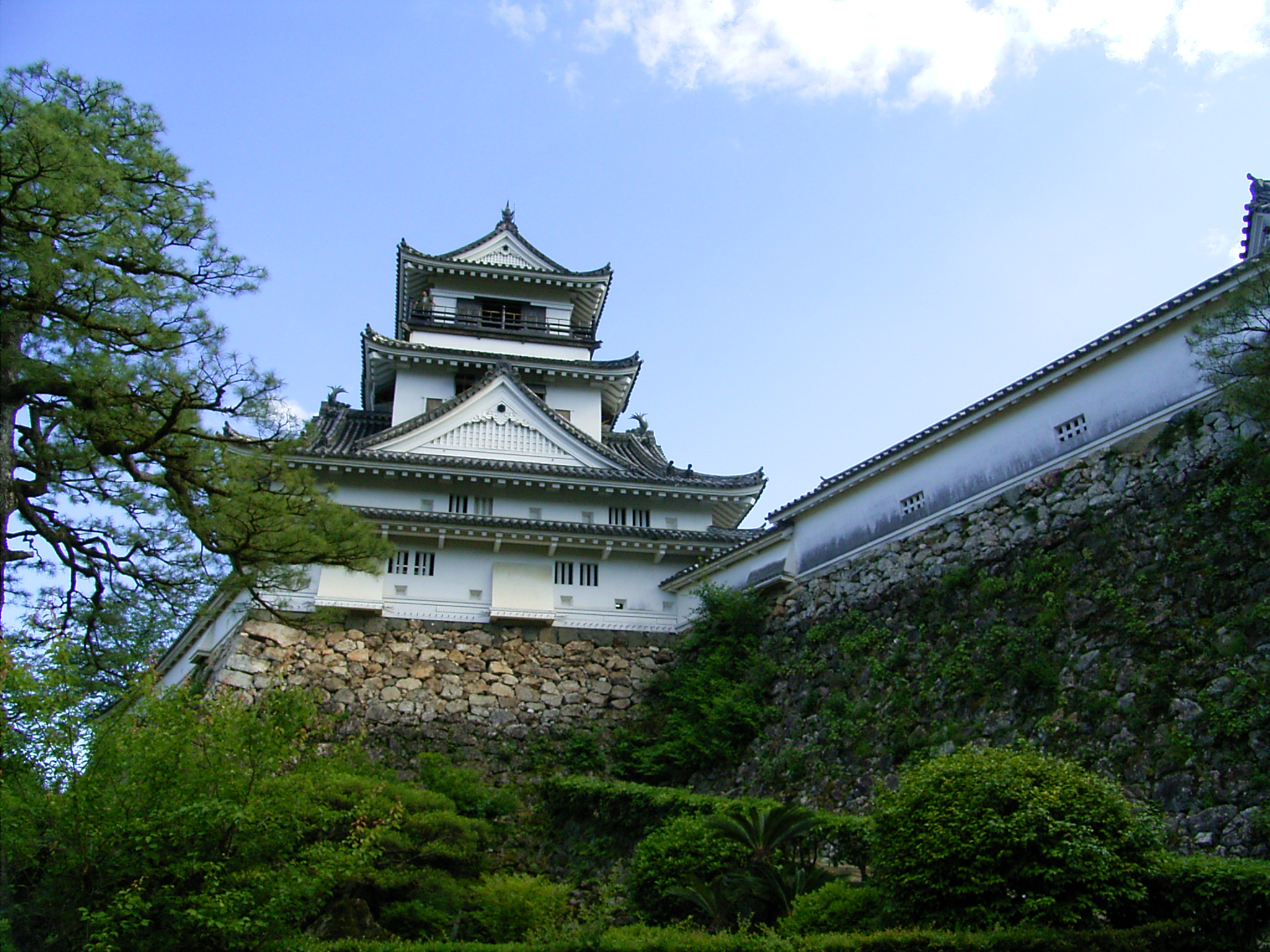
Kōchi Castle at the end of the route

The Tosa Kaidō (土佐街道) was an ancient trade route in Japan that is now mirrored by the modern National Route 33.

== History ==
The Tosa Kaidō was established during the Yamato period.

The Tosa Domain used a route that connected Kōchi with the modern-day Shikokuchūō sankin kōtai. This route was called the "Old Tosa Kaidō" (旧土佐街道 Kyū-Tosa Kaidō).

It developed into an official highway during the Meiji period, before being renamed the Prefectural Matsuyama-Kōchi Highway (県道松山高知線 Kendō Matsuyama-Kōchi-sen).

On January 18, 1945, it was renamed as National Route 23, before becoming National Route 33 on December 4 of the same year.

== See also ==
- Edo Five Routes
- Kaidō
