= Kōchi-Tōbu Expressway =

Expressway in Kochi Prefecture, Japan

Kōchi-Tōbu Expressway
- 高知東部自動車道

Route information
- Maintained by Ministry of Land, Infrastructure, Transport and Tourism
- Length: 36.0 km (22.4 mi)
- Existed: 2011–present
- Component highways: National Route 55

Location
- Country: Japan

Highway system
- National highways of Japan; Expressways of Japan

The Kōchi-Tōbu Expressway (高知東部自動車道, Kōchi-Tōbu Jidōsha-dō) is an incomplete two-lane national expressway in Kōchi Prefecture. It is owned and operated by the Ministry of Land, Infrastructure, Transport and Tourism (MLIT). The route is signed as an auxiliary route of National Route 55 as well E55 under MLIT's "2016 Proposal for Realization of Expressway Numbering."

== Route description ==
The speed limit is 70 km/h for the entire route. There is only one lane traveling in each direction along the entirety of the expressway.

== History ==
The existing portions (as of February 2019) of the expressway opened in five phases between March 2011 and April 2016.

Kōchi Ryoma Airport-Kōnan Noichi section was opened on March 15th, 2025.

== Junction list ==
The entire expressway is in Kōchi Prefecture.

Location	km	mi	Exit	Name	Destinations	Notes
Kōchi	0	0.0	-	Kōchi	Kōchi Expressway	Western terminus of the expressway
Kōchi	2.8	1.7	1	Kōchi-chūō	Kōchi Route 374	
Kōchi	6.2	3.9	2	Kōchi-minami	Kōchi Route 376	
Nankoku	10.9	6.8	3	Nankoku	Kōchi Route 375	
Nankoku	15.0	9.3	4	Kōchi Ryoma Airport	Kōchi Route 13 – Kōchi Airport	
Kōnan	18.5	11.5	5	Kōnan-Noichi	National Route 55	
Kōnan	20.7	12.9	6	Kōnan-Kagami	Kōchi Route 227	
Kōnan	23.6	14.7	7	Kōnan-Yasu	Kōchi Route 51	
Geisei	27.5	17.1	8	Geisei-nishi	National Route 55	Eastern terminus of the expressway (as of February 2019)
Geisei	30.5	19.0	9	Geisei-higashi	National Route 55	
Aki	36.0	22.4	10	Aki-nishi	National Route 55	Planned eastern terminus of the expressway
1.000 mi = 1.609 km; 1.000 km = 0.621 mi: Unopened

== See also ==
- Japan National Route 55
- Kōchi Expressway
