= Ocean Ridge Airport =

- IATA: none; ICAO: none; FAA LID: E55

Summary
- Airport type: Public
- Owner: John H. Bower
- Serves: Gualala, California
- Elevation AMSL: 940 ft (290 m)
- Coordinates: 38°48′06″N 123°31′50″W
- Interactive map of Ocean Ridge Airport

Runways
Direction	Length		Surface
Direction	ft	m	Surface
13/31	2,500	762	Asphalt

Statistics (2008)
- Aircraft operations: 5,000
- Based aircraft: 21
- Source: Federal Aviation Administration

Ocean Ridge Airport (FAA LID: E55, formerly Q69) is a privately owned public-use airport located three nautical miles (6 km) north of the central business district of Gualala, in Mendocino County, California, United States.

== Facilities and aircraft ==
Ocean Ridge Airport covers an area of 30 acres (12 ha) at an elevation of 940 feet (287 m) above mean sea level. It has one runway designated 13/31 with an asphalt surface measuring 2,500 by 50 feet (762 x 15 m).

For the 12-month period ending November 21, 2008, the airport had 5,000 general aviation aircraft operations, an average of 13 per day. At that time there were 21 aircraft based at this airport: 95% single-engine and 5% multi-engine.
