= Japan National Route 32 =

Road in Japan

National Route 32
- 国道32号

Route information
- Length: 139.9 km (86.9 mi)
- Existed: 4 December 1952–present

Major junctions
- North end: National Route 11 / National Route 172 in Takamatsu
- South end: National Route 55 / National Route 375 in Kōchi

Location
- Country: Japan

Highway system
- National highways of Japan; Expressways of Japan
← National Route 31	→ National Route 33

National Route 32 (国道32号, Kokudō sanjūni-gō) is a national highway connecting Takamatsu and Kōchi in Japan.

== Route data ==
- Length: 139.9 km (86.9 mi)
- Origin: Takamatsu (originates at the junction with Routes 11 and 30)
- Terminus: Kōchi (ends at the origin of Routes 33, 55, 194, 195 and 197, the terminus of Route 55)
- Major cities: Miyoshi

== History ==
- 1952-12-04 - First Class National Highway 32 (from Takamatsu to Kōchi)
- 1965-04-01 - General National Highway 32 (from Takamatsu to Kōchi)

== Municipalities passed through ==
- Kagawa Prefecture
  - Takamatsu - Ayagawa - Marugame - Manno - Mitoyo
- Tokushima Prefecture
- Kōchi Prefecture

== Intersects with ==
- Kagawa Prefecture
- Tokushima Prefecture
- Kōchi Prefecture
