= Japan National Route 56 =

National highway in Japan

National Route 56
- 国道56号

Route information
- Length: 300.2 km (186.5 mi)
- Existed: 1 April 1963–present

Major junctions
- West end: National Route 11 in Matsuyama
- East end: National Route 32 / National Route 33 / National Route 55 / National Route 194 / National Route 195 / National Route 197 / National Route 493 in Kōchi

Location
- Country: Japan

Highway system
- National highways of Japan; Expressways of Japan
← National Route 55	→ National Route 57

National Route 56 is a national highway of Japan connecting Kōchi and Matsuyama.

== History ==
Route 56 was designated on 18 May 1953 on the current route as National Route 197, and this was redesignated as Route 56 on 1 April 1963 when the route was promoted to a first-class highway.

== Route data ==
- Length: 300.2 km (186.54 mi).
