= Japan National Route 30 =

National highway in Japan

National Route 30
- 国道30号
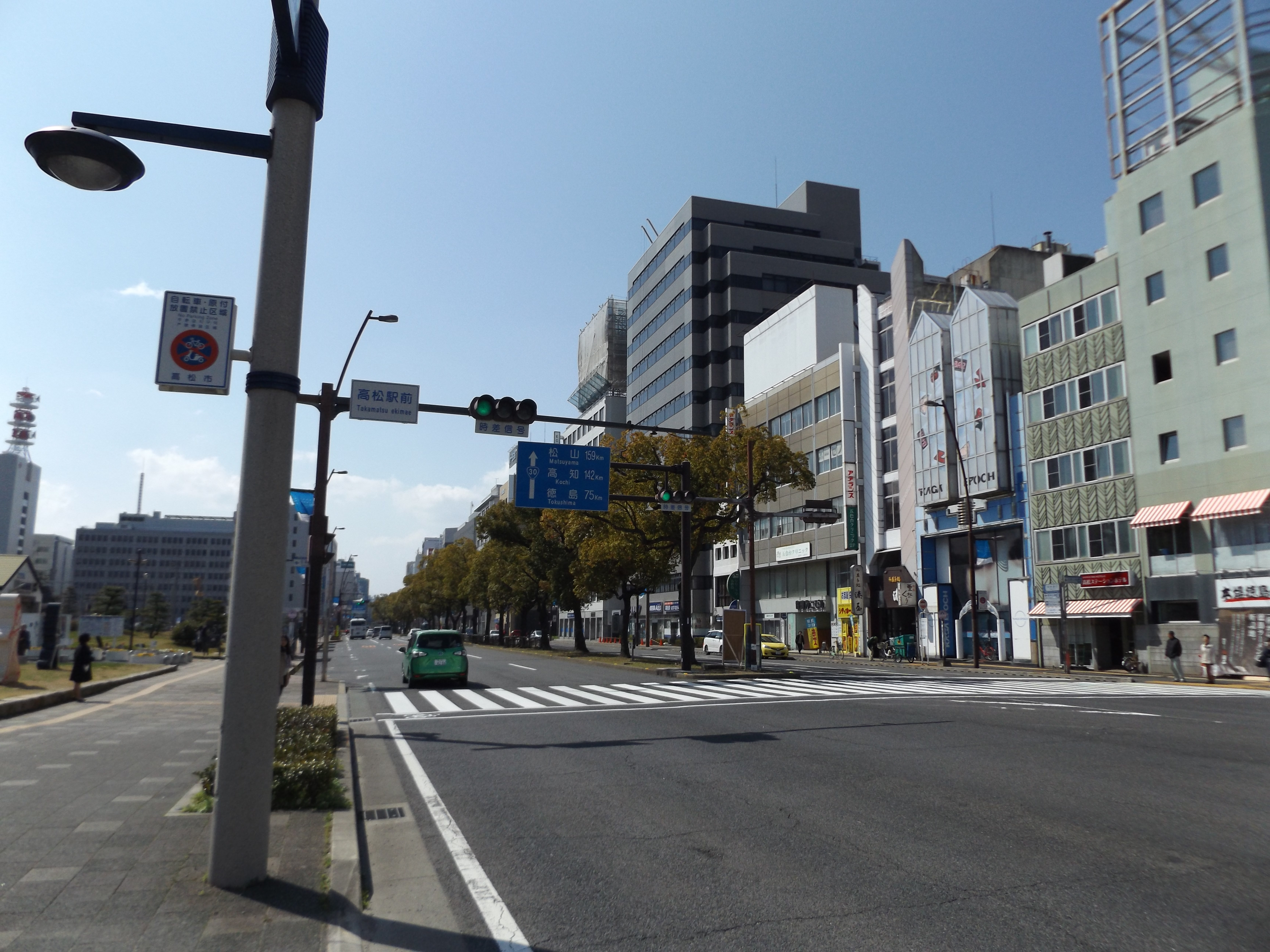

Route information
- Length: 26.4 km (16.4 mi)
- Existed: 4 December 1952–present

Major junctions
- North end: National Route 2 in Okayama
- National Route 430
- South end: National Route 11 in Takamatsu

Location
- Country: Japan

Highway system
- National highways of Japan; Expressways of Japan
← National Route 29	→ National Route 31

National Route 30 (国道30号, Kokudō sanjū-gō) is a national highway connecting Okayama and Takamatsu in Japan.

== Route data ==
- Length: 26.4 km (16.4 mi)
- Origin: Okayama (originates at the origin of Routes 53 and 180, the terminus of Route 250)
- Terminus: Takamatsu (ends at junction with Route 11)
- Major cities: Tamano

== History ==
- 1952-12-04 - First Class National Highway 30 (from Okayama to Takamatsu)
- 1965-04-01 - General National Highway 30 (from Okayama to Takamatsu)

== Intersects with ==
- Okayama Prefecture
- Kagawa Prefecture
