= Japan National Route 197 =

Road in Japan

National Route 197
- 国道197号
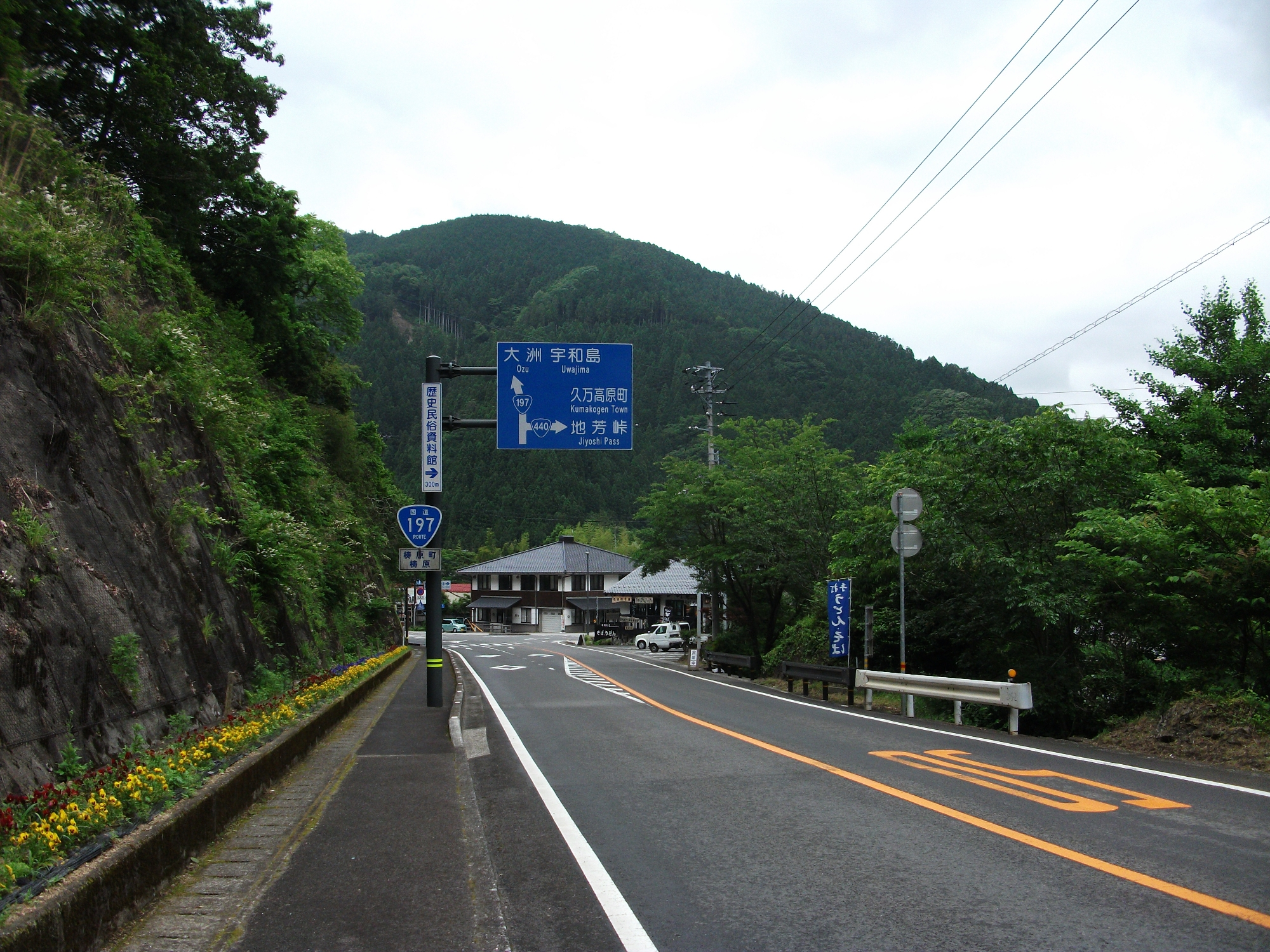

Route information
- Length: 223.1 km (138.6 mi)
- Existed: 1 April 1963–present

Major junctions
- West end: National Route 10 / National Route 210 in Ōita
- East end: National Route 56 in Susaki, Kōchi

Location
- Country: Japan

Highway system
- National highways of Japan; Expressways of Japan
← National Route 196	→ National Route 198

National Route 197 (国道197号, Kokudō Hyaku-kyūjū-nana-gō) is a Japanese national highway running on the islands of Kyūshū and Shikoku. The 223.1-kilometer-long (138.6 mi) highway originates at a junction with Routes 10 and 210 in Ōita and terminates at a junction with Route 56 in Susaki, Kōchi. The route is interrupted between Saganoseki area of Ōita (where it joins with Route 217) and Ikata, Ehime because of the Hōyo Strait, and traffic between the two islands is carried by a ferry between the two towns. Though the gap is less than 15 km at the strait's narrowest point, there are currently no plans to bridge the gap.

== History ==
Route 197 was originally designated on 18 May 1953 from Matsuyama to Kōchi. This was redesignated as Route 56 on 1 April 1963.

== Route description ==
The road is affectionately nicknamed "Melody Line". As a result, it gained two musical road segments located in Ikata, the first of which was placed on the road to celebrate its anniversary of being built in 2011, so the road could literally have a "melody". The second segment was not completed until 2018. Two Japanese folk songs can be heard, one in each direction, when these short segments of the road are driven over. The songs are created by grooves in the roadway (rumble strips) arranged to form melodies.
