= Smart interchange =

Feature of Japanese expressways

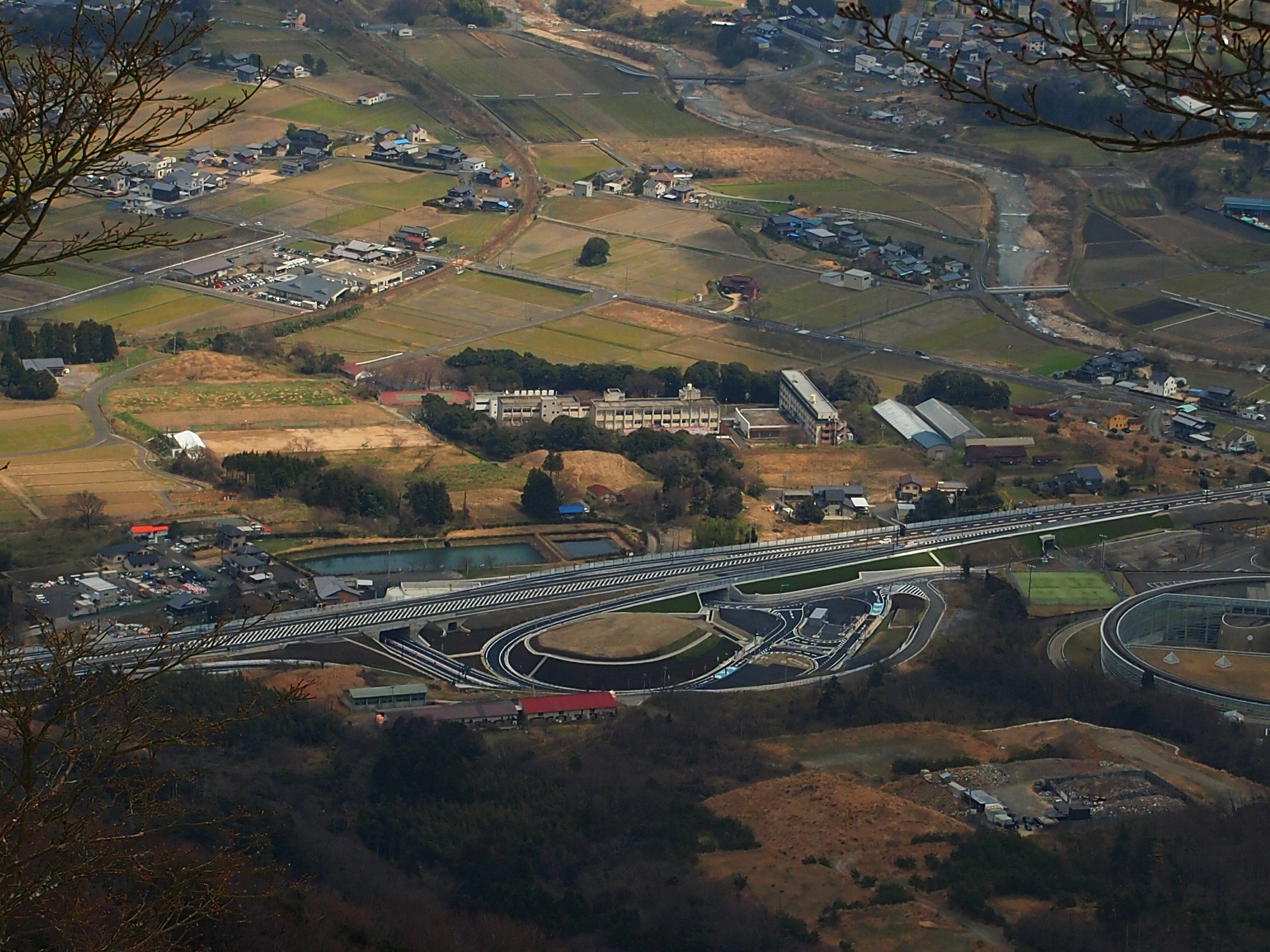
A smart interchange on the Maizuru-Wakasa Expressway in Tsuruga, Fukui

A smart interchange (スマートインターチェンジ, Sumāto Intāchenji) is a feature of Japanese expressways that provides exclusive access to and from the expressway for vehicles equipped with electronic toll collection (ETC). The feature increases accessibility to and from the expressway in less-populated areas while cutting construction and maintenance costs. Smart interchanges can be built by adding connector roads between local roads and pre-existing service areas, parking areas, or bus stops located along expressways or by building simpler interchanges than were previously implemented in Japan.

== Design ==
The objective of a smart interchange is to increase accessibility to areas that were not served by full-scale interchanges in order to spread out the economic, logistical, and disaster recovery benefits that a high-speed road provides beyond more densely populated areas. This often is achieved by adding connector roads between local roads and service areas, parking areas, or bus stops that are located along expressways. The connector roads are then equipped with gates that allow the free-flow of traffic that utilizes ETC payment. In the past, Japan's tolled expressways involved complex interchanges, such as the continuous green T hybrid interchange to streamline the number of points where cash tolls were collected. The rise of ETC and the introduction of smart interchanges has allowed new smart interchanges be built in the more simple, diamond interchange layout, resulting in lower construction and maintenance costs. The average cost of installing a new interchange along an expressway is 35 billion yen while a new smart interchange costs about 20 billion yen to build.

== History ==
In October 2004, an experiment was conducted on the Tōhoku Expressway's Fukushima-Matsukawa Smart Interchange, which was installed onto the pre-existing Fukushima-Matsukawa Parking Area in the city of Fukushima. After the experimental smart interchange was deemed successful, the Fukushima-Matsukawa Smart Interchange as well as sixteen others around the country were officially opened to traffic across the country in October 2006. As of March 2020, 136 smart interchanges are operational across Japan's expressways.
