= Japan National Route 493 =

National highway in Japan

National Route 493
- 国道493号

Route information
- Length: 98.3 km (61.1 mi)

Location
- Country: Japan

Highway system
- National highways of Japan; Expressways of Japan
← National Route 492	→ National Route 494

National Route 493 is a national highway of Japan. The highway connects Kochi, Kochi and Tōyō, Kochi. It has a total length of 98.3 kilometers (61.1 mi).
