= Japan National Route 11 =

National highway in Japan

National Route 11
- 国道11号

Route information
- Length: 239.4 km (148.8 mi)
- Existed: 4 December 1952–present

Major junctions
- West end: National Route 33 / National Route 56 / National Route 317 / National Route 379 / National Route 440 / National Route 494 in Matsuyama
- East end: National Route 28 / National Route 55 / National Route 195 in Tokushima

Location
- Country: Japan

Highway system
- National highways of Japan; Expressways of Japan
← National Route 10	→ National Route 12

National Route 11 (国道11号, Kokudō Jūichi-gō) is a Japanese highway on the island of Shikoku. The most important artery in Shikoku, it originates at the intersection with Routes 28, 55 and 195 in the prefectural capital of Tokushima (Tokushima Prefecture) and terminates at the intersection with Routes 33, 56, 317, 379, 440 and 494 in Matsuyama (the capital of Ehime Prefecture). Between the terminals, it passes through Naruto (Tokushima Prefecture) and Takamatsu (the capital of Kagawa Prefecture), as well as other regional population centers. Route 11 measures 239.4 km in length.

== Route data ==
- Length: 239.4 km (148.8 mi)
- Origin: Tokushima (originates at junction with Routes 28, 55 and 195)
- Terminus: Matsuyama (ends at Junction with Routes 33, 56, 317, 379, 440 and 494)
- Major cities: Naruto, Takamatsu, Sakaide, Marugame, Shikokuchuo, Niihama, Saijo, Toon

== History ==
- 4 December 1952 - First Class National Highway 11 (from Tokushima to Matsuyama)
- 1 April 1965 - General National Highway 11 (from Tokushima to Matsuyama)

== Overlapping sections ==
- From Tokushima (Kachidoki-bashi intersection) to Matsushige: Route 28
- From Naruto (Naruto IC intersection) to Higashikagawa (Takoda intersection): Route 377
- In Takamatsu, from Bancho intersection to Nakajincho intersection: Routes 30 and 436
