= List of national highways of Japan =

This list of prefectural route of Japan contains every national route in Japan.

== List of highways ==
Number	Origin	Terminus	Length (km)	Vehicles only (popular name)
National Route 1	Chūō, Tokyo	Kita-ku, Osaka	566.4	
National Route 2	Kita-ku, Osaka	Moji-ku, Kitakyūshū	533.7	
National Route 3	Moji-ku, Kitakyūshū	Kagoshima	391.6	
National Route 4	Chūō, Tokyo	Aomori	742.9	
National Route 5	Hakodate	Chūō-ku, Sapporo	279.6	
National Route 6	Chūō, Tokyo	Miyagino-ku, Sendai	345.8	
National Route 7	Chūō-ku, Niigata	Aomori	475.7	
National Route 8	Chūō-ku, Niigata	Shimogyō-ku, Kyoto	572.6	
National Route 9	Shimogyō-ku, Kyoto	Shimonoseki	643.4	
National Route 10	Moji-ku, Kitakyūshū	Kagoshima	454.8	
National Route 11	Tokushima, Tokushima	Matsuyama	232.1	
National Route 12	Chūō-ku, Sapporo	Asahikawa	136.2	
National Route 13	Fukushima, Fukushima	Akita, Akita	306.1	
National Route 14	Chūō, Tokyo	Chūō-ku, Chiba	39.7	Keiyō Road
National Route 15	Chūō, Tokyo	Kanagawa-ku, Yokohama	28.8	
National Route 16	Nishi-ku, Yokohama	Nishi-ku, Yokohama	251.0	
National Route 17	Chūō, Tokyo	Chūō-ku, Niigata	349.4	
National Route 18	Takasaki	Jōetsu, Niigata	193.9	
National Route 19	Atsuta-ku, Nagoya	Nagano, Nagano	266.4	
National Route 20	Chūō, Tokyo	Shiojiri, Nagano	225.0	
National Route 21	Mizunami, Gifu	Maibara, Shiga	101.4	
National Route 22	Atsuta-ku, Nagoya	Gifu	37.0	
National Route 23	Toyohashi	Ise, Mie	181.3	
National Route 24	Shimogyō-ku, Kyoto	Wakayama, Wakayama	141.2	
National Route 25	Yokkaichi	Kita-ku, Osaka	144.5	
National Route 26	Kita-ku, Osaka	Wakayama, Wakayama	71.8	
National Route 27	Tsuruga, Fukui	Kyōtamba, Kyoto	140.9	
National Route 28	Chūō-ku, Kobe	Tokushima, Tokushima	89.9	
National Route 29	Himeji	Tottori, Tottori	118.6	
National Route 30	Okayama	Takamatsu	26.4	
National Route 31	Kaita, Hiroshima	Kure, Hiroshima	20.1	
National Route 32	Takamatsu	Kōchi, Kōchi	138.5	
National Route 33	Kōchi, Kōchi	Matsuyama	122.3	
National Route 34	Tosu, Saga	Nagasaki	136.5	
National Route 35	Takeo, Saga	Sasebo	35.2	
National Route 36	Chūō-ku, Sapporo	Muroran	133.2	
National Route 37	Oshamanbe, Hokkaidō	Muroran	80.8	
National Route 38	Takikawa, Hokkaidō	Kushiro	298.7	
National Route 39	Asahikawa, Hokkaidō	Abashiri	213.6	
National Route 40	Asahikawa, Hokkaidō	Wakkanai	249.8	
National Route 41	Higashi-ku, Nagoya	Toyama, Toyama	252.1	
National Route 42	Chūō-ku, Hamamatsu	Wakayama, Wakayama	469.6	
National Route 43	Nishinari-ku, Osaka	Nada-ku, Kobe	30.2	
National Route 44	Kushiro	Nemuro, Hokkaidō	124.8	
National Route 45	Aoba-ku, Sendai	Aomori	516.9	
National Route 46	Morioka	Akita, Akita	116.2	
National Route 47	Miyagino-ku, Sendai	Sakata, Yamagata	173.6	
National Route 48	Aoba-ku, Sendai	Yamagata, Yamagata	75	
National Route 49	Iwaki, Fukushima	Chūō-ku, Niigata	246.4	
National Route 50	Maebashi	Mito, Ibaraki	144.2	
National Route 51	Chūō-ku, Chiba	Mito, Ibaraki	124	
National Route 52	Shimizu-ku, Shizuoka	Kōfu, Yamanashi	100.1	
National Route 53	Okayama	Tottori, Tottori	138.5	
National Route 54	Naka-ku, Hiroshima	Matsue, Shimane	174.5	
National Route 55	Tokushima, Tokushima	Kōchi, Kōchi	210.2	
National Route 56	Kōchi, Kōchi	Matsuyama	300.2	
National Route 57	Ōita, Ōita	Nagasaki	258.9	
National Route 58	Kagoshima	Naha	248.1	
National Route 101	Aomori	Akita, Akita	251.2	
National Route 102	Hirosaki	Towada	101.8	
National Route 103	Aomori	Ōdate	133.6	
National Route 104	Hachinohe	Ōdate	128.8	
National Route 105	Yurihonjō	Kitaakita	172.3	
National Route 106	Miyako, Iwate	Morioka	94.4	
National Route 107	Ōfunato, Iwate	Yurihonjō	192.5	
National Route 108	Ishinomaki	Yurihonjō	186.9	
National Route 112	Yamagata, Yamagata	Sakata, Yamagata	140.3	
National Route 113	Chūō-ku, Niigata	Sōma, Fukushima	235.2	
National Route 114	Fukushima, Fukushima	Namie, Fukushima	69.5	
National Route 115	Sōma, Fukushima	Inawashiro	109.7	
National Route 116	Kashiwazaki, Niigata	Chūō-ku, Niigata	77.8	
National Route 117	Nagano, Nagano	Ojiya, Niigata	120.1	
National Route 118	Mito, Ibaraki	Aizuwakamatsu	206.1	
National Route 119	Nikkō	Utsunomiya, Tochigi	39.4	
National Route 120	Nikkō	Numata, Gunma	95.2	
National Route 121	Yonezawa, Yamagata	Mashiko, Tochigi	246.4	
National Route 122	Nikkō	Toshima, Tokyo	158.3	
National Route 123	Utsunomiya, Tochigi	Mito, Ibaraki	70	
National Route 124	Chōshi	Mito, Ibaraki	88.1	
National Route 125	Katori, Chiba	Kumagaya	128.4	
National Route 126	Chōshi	Chūō-ku, Chiba	79.2	Chiba-Tōgane Road
National Route 127	Tateyama, Chiba	Kisarazu	54.5	
National Route 128	Tateyama, Chiba	Chūō-ku, Chiba	131.6	
National Route 129	Hiratsuka	Sagamihara	31.7	
National Route 130	Minato, Tokyo	Minato, Tokyo	0.5	
National Route 131	Ōta, Tokyo	Ōta, Tokyo	3.6	
National Route 132	Kawasaki-ku, Kawasaki	Kawasaki-ku, Kawasaki	4.5	
National Route 133	Naka-ku, Yokohama	Naka-ku, Yokohama	1.4	
National Route 134	Yokosuka	Ōiso	61.1	
National Route 135	Shimoda, Shizuoka	Odawara	94.4	
National Route 136	Shimoda, Shizuoka	Mishima, Shizuoka	111.3	
National Route 137	Fujiyoshida	Fuefuki	30	
National Route 138	Fujiyoshida	Odawara	61.4	
National Route 139	Fuji, Shizuoka	Okutama, Tokyo	134.4	
National Route 140	Kumagaya	Masuho, Yamanashi	146.6	
National Route 141	Nirasaki, Yamanashi	Ueda, Nagano	104.9	
National Route 142	Karuizawa, Nagano	Shimosuwa	77.3	
National Route 143	Matsumoto, Nagano	Ueda, Nagano	51	
National Route 144	Naganohara	Ueda, Nagano	45.3	
National Route 145	Naganohara	Numata, Gunma	49.8	
National Route 146	Naganohara	Karuizawa, Nagano	30.2	
National Route 147	Ōmachi, Nagano	Matsumoto, Nagano	34.6	
National Route 148	Ōmachi, Nagano	Itoigawa	69.9	
National Route 149	Shimizu-ku, Shizuoka	Shimizu-ku, Shizuoka	2.6	
National Route 150	Shimizu-ku, Shizuoka	Chūō-ku, Hamamatsu	102.2	
National Route 151	Iida, Nagano	Toyohashi	137.4	
National Route 152	Ueda, Nagano	Chūō-ku, Hamamatsu	252.4	
National Route 153	Higashi-ku, Nagoya	Shiojiri, Nagano	213.4	
National Route 154	Higashi-ku, Nagoya	Atsuta-ku, Nagoya	4	
National Route 155	Tokoname	Yatomi, Aichi	126.9	
National Route 156	Gifu	Takaoka, Toyama	213.3	
National Route 157	Kanazawa	Gifu	202.6	
National Route 158	Fukui, Fukui	Matsumoto, Nagano	250.1	
National Route 159	Nanao, Ishikawa	Kanazawa	64.8	
National Route 160	Nanao, Ishikawa	Takaoka, Toyama	45.8	
National Route 161	Tsuruga, Fukui	Ōtsu, Shiga	86.4	
National Route 162	Shimogyō-ku, Kyoto	Tsuruga, Fukui	148	
National Route 163	Kita-ku, Osaka	Tsu, Mie	124.6	
National Route 164	Yokkaichi	Yokkaichi	3	
National Route 165	Kita-ku, Osaka	Tsu, Mie	124.7	
National Route 166	Habikino	Matsusaka	125.4	
National Route 167	Shima, Mie	Ise, Mie	40.2	
National Route 168	Shingū, Wakayama	Hirakata	194.8	
National Route 169	Nara, Nara	Shingū, Wakayama	184.6	
National Route 170	Takatsuki	Izumisano, Osaka	74	
National Route 171	Minami-ku, Kyoto	Chūō-ku, Kobe	67.7	
National Route 172	Minato-ku, Osaka	Chūō-ku, Osaka	8	
National Route 173	Ikeda, Osaka	Ayabe, Kyoto	72.4	
National Route 174	Chūō-ku, Kobe	Chūō-ku, Kobe	0.2	
National Route 175	Akashi, Hyōgo	Maizuru, Kyoto	126.4	
National Route 176	Miyazu, Kyoto	Kita-ku, Osaka	154.2	
National Route 177	Maizuru, Kyoto	Maizuru, Kyoto	0.7	
National Route 178	Maizuru, Kyoto	Iwami, Tottori	201	
National Route 179	Himeji	Yurihama, Tottori	158.7	
National Route 180	Okayama	Matsue, Shimane	198.9	
National Route 181	Tsuyama	Yonago	101.8	
National Route 182	Niimi	Fukuyama, Hiroshima	79.7	
National Route 183	Naka-ku, Hiroshima	Yonago	196.4	
National Route 184	Izumo, Shimane	Onomichi, Hiroshima	203	
National Route 185	Kure, Hiroshima	Mihara, Hiroshima	68.4	
National Route 186	Gōtsu, Shimane	Ōtake, Hiroshima	145.5	
National Route 187	Iwakuni	Masuda, Shimane	108.4	
National Route 188	Iwakuni	Kudamatsu, Yamaguchi	67.7	
National Route 189	Iwakuni	Iwakuni	2.9	
National Route 190	Yamaguchi, Yamaguchi	San'yō-Onoda	40.9	
National Route 191	Shimonoseki	Naka-ku, Hiroshima	284.1	
National Route 192	Saijō, Ehime	Tokushima, Tokushima	138.3	
National Route 193	Takamatsu	Kaiyō, Tokushima	155.7	
National Route 194	Kōchi, Kōchi	Saijō, Ehime	88.3	
National Route 195	Kōchi, Kōchi	Tokushima, Tokushima	178.2	
National Route 196	Matsuyama	Saijō, Ehime	66.4	
National Route 197	Kōchi, Kōchi	Ōita, Ōita	222.7	
National Route 198	Moji-ku, Kitakyūshū	Moji-ku, Kitakyūshū	0.6	
National Route 199	Moji-ku, Kitakyūshū	Yahatanishi-ku, Kitakyūshū	33.2	
National Route 200	Yahatanishi-ku, Kitakyūshū	Chikushino, Fukuoka	60.4	
National Route 201	Higashi-ku, Fukuoka	Kanda, Fukuoka	64.5	
National Route 202	Hakata-ku, Fukuoka	Nagasaki	199.6	
National Route 203	Karatsu, Saga	Saga, Saga	47.3	
National Route 204	Karatsu, Saga	Sasebo	157	
National Route 205	Sasebo	Higashisonogi, Nagasaki	23.2	
National Route 206	Nagasaki	Sasebo	72.6	
National Route 207	Saga, Saga	Togitsu, Nagasaki	112.8	
National Route 208	Chūō-ku, Kumamoto	Saga, Saga	84.7	
National Route 209	Ōmuta, Fukuoka	Kurume	35.5	
National Route 210	Kurume	Ōita, Ōita	136.2	
National Route 211	Hita, Ōita	Yahatanishi-ku, Kitakyūshū	76.3	
National Route 212	Nakatsu, Ōita	Aso, Kumamoto	106.8	
National Route 213	Beppu	Nakatsu, Ōita	124.8	
National Route 217	Ōita, Ōita	Saiki, Ōita	92.3	
National Route 218	Chūō-ku, Kumamoto	Nobeoka	145.9	
National Route 219	Chūō-ku, Kumamoto	Miyazaki, Miyazaki	207.4	
National Route 220	Miyazaki, Miyazaki	Kirishima, Kagoshima	186.1	
National Route 221	Hitoyoshi, Kumamoto	Miyakonojō	74.6	
National Route 222	Nichinan, Miyazaki	Miyakonojō	55.2	
National Route 223	Kobayashi, Miyazaki	Kirishima, Kagoshima	72.5	
National Route 224	Tarumizu, Kagoshima	Kagoshima	14.2	
National Route 225	Makurazaki, Kagoshima	Kagoshima	53.1	
National Route 226	Minamisatsuma	Kagoshima	157.4	
National Route 227	Hakodate	Esashi, Hokkaidō	69.7	
National Route 228	Hakodate	Esashi, Hokkaidō	151.5	
National Route 229	Otaru	Esashi, Hokkaidō	307	
National Route 230	Chūō-ku, Sapporo	Setana, Hokkaidō	195.4	
National Route 231	Kita-ku, Sapporo	Rumoi, Hokkaidō	129.2	
National Route 232	Wakkanai	Rumoi, Hokkaidō	184.8	
National Route 233	Asahikawa, Hokkaidō	Rumoi, Hokkaidō	78.3	
National Route 234	Iwamizawa, Hokkaidō	Tomakomai, Hokkaidō	66.8	
National Route 235	Muroran	Urakawa, Hokkaidō	195.8	
National Route 236	Obihiro	Urakawa, Hokkaidō	139.1	
National Route 237	Asahikawa, Hokkaidō	Urakawa, Hokkaidō	260	
National Route 238	Abashiri	Wakkanai	327.3	
National Route 239	Abashiri	Rumoi, Hokkaidō	346.6	
National Route 240	Kushiro	Abashiri	149	
National Route 241	Teshikaga, Hokkaidō	Obihiro	162.5	
National Route 242	Abashiri	Obihiro	284.9	
National Route 243	Abashiri	Nemuro, Hokkaidō	173.1	
National Route 244	Abashiri	Nemuro, Hokkaidō	153.9	
National Route 245	Mito, Ibaraki	Hitachi, Ibaraki	42.6	
National Route 246	Chiyoda, Tokyo	Numazu, Shizuoka	122.7	
National Route 247	Atsuta-ku, Nagoya	Toyohashi	150.8	
National Route 248	Gamagōri, Aichi	Gifu	113.3	
National Route 249	Nanao, Ishikawa	Kanazawa	248.8	
National Route 250	Chūō-ku, Kobe	Okayama	146.3	
National Route 251	Nagasaki	Isahaya, Nagasaki	148.2	
National Route 252	Kashiwazaki, Niigata	Aizuwakamatsu	204.6	
National Route 253	Jōetsu, Niigata	Minamiuonuma	67.8	
National Route 254	Bunkyō, Tokyo	Matsumoto, Nagano	226.1	
National Route 255	Hadano, Kanagawa	Odawara	20.3	
National Route 256	Gifu	Iida, Nagano	243.4	
National Route 257	Chūō-ku, Hamamatsu	Takayama, Gifu	241.6	
National Route 258	Ōgaki, Gifu	Kuwana, Mie	41.5	
National Route 259	Toba, Mie	Toyohashi	47	
National Route 260	Shima, Mie	Kihoku, Mie	102.9	
National Route 261	Naka-ku, Hiroshima	Gōtsu, Shimane	102.2	
National Route 262	Hagi, Yamaguchi	Hōfu, Yamaguchi	57.2	
National Route 263	Sawara-ku, Fukuoka	Saga, Saga	48	
National Route 264	Saga, Saga	Kurume	27.4	
National Route 265	Kobayashi, Miyazaki	Aso, Kumamoto	203.8	
National Route 266	Amakusa, Kumamoto	Chūō-ku, Kumamoto	155.3	
National Route 267	Hitoyoshi, Kumamoto	Satsumasendai, Kagoshima	82.7	
National Route 268	Minamata, Kumamoto	Miyazaki, Miyazaki	114.3	
National Route 269	Ibusuki, Kagoshima	Miyazaki, Miyazaki	147.4	
National Route 270	Makurazaki, Kagoshima	Ichikikushikino	52.4	
National Route 271	Odawara	Atsugi, Kanagawa	33.1	Odawara-Atsugi Road
National Route 272	Kushiro	Shibetsu, Hokkaidō	113.1	
National Route 273	Obihiro	Monbetsu, Hokkaidō	235.2	
National Route 274	Kita-ku, Sapporo	Shibecha, Hokkaidō	371.8	
National Route 275	Chūō-ku, Sapporo	Hamatonbetsu, Hokkaidō	315.2	
National Route 276	Esashi, Hokkaidō	Tomakomai, Hokkaidō	315.4	
National Route 277	Esashi, Hokkaidō	Yakumo, Hokkaidō	61	
National Route 278	Hakodate	Mori, Hokkaidō	114.3	
National Route 279	Hakodate	Noheji, Aomori	107	
National Route 280	Aomori	Hakodate	140.9	
National Route 281	Morioka	Kuji, Iwate	111.9	
National Route 282	Morioka	Hirakawa, Aomori	124.4	
National Route 283	Kamaishi, Iwate	Hanamaki, Iwate	89.3	
National Route 284	Rikuzentakata, Iwate	Ichinoseki, Iwate	71.9	
National Route 285	Akita, Akita	Kazuno, Akita	116	
National Route 286	Taihaku-ku, Sendai	Yamagata, Yamagata	61.9	
National Route 287	Yonezawa, Yamagata	Higashine, Yamagata	82	
National Route 288	Kōriyama, Fukushima	Futaba, Fukushima	68.3	
National Route 289	Chūō-ku, Niigata	Iwaki, Fukushima	275.4	
National Route 290	Murakami, Niigata	Uonuma, Niigata	165.5	
National Route 291	Maebashi	Kashiwazaki, Niigata	161.6	
National Route 292	Naganohara	Myōkō, Niigata	112.6	
National Route 293	Hitachi, Ibaraki	Ashikaga, Tochigi	164.2	
National Route 294	Kashiwa, Chiba	Aizuwakamatsu	249.9	
National Route 295	Narita, Chiba	Narita, Chiba	5.8	
National Route 296	Sōsa, Chiba	Funabashi	59	
National Route 297	Tateyama, Chiba	Ichihara, Chiba	107	
National Route 298	Wakō, Saitama	Ichikawa, Chiba	32.2	
National Route 299	Chino, Nagano	Iruma, Saitama	189.3	
National Route 300	Fujiyoshida	Minobu, Yamanashi	48.2	
National Route 301	Chūō-ku, Hamamatsu	Toyota, Aichi	99.2	
National Route 302	Nakagawa-ku, Nagoya	Nakagawa-ku, Nagoya	54	
National Route 303	Gifu	Wakasa, Fukui	122.8	
National Route 304	Kanazawa	Nanto, Toyama	48.6	
National Route 305	Kanazawa	Minamiechizen, Fukui	145.5	
National Route 306	Tsu, Mie	Hikone, Shiga	89.9	
National Route 307	Hikone, Shiga	Hirakata	103.7	
National Route 308	Chūō-ku, Osaka	Nara, Nara	32.9	
National Route 309	Kumano, Mie	Hirano-ku, Osaka	145.5	
National Route 310	Sakai-ku, Sakai	Gojō, Nara	39.3	
National Route 311	Owase, Mie	Kamitonda, Wakayama	147.4	
National Route 312	Miyazu, Kyoto	Himeji	153.5	
National Route 313	Fukuyama, Hiroshima	Hokuei, Tottori	171.5	
National Route 314	Fukuyama, Hiroshima	Unnan, Shimane	142.4	
National Route 315	Shūnan	Hagi, Yamaguchi	88.9	
National Route 316	Nagato, Yamaguchi	San'yō-Onoda	40.2	
National Route 317	Matsuyama	Onomichi, Hiroshima	99.2	Nishiseto Expressway
National Route 318	Tokushima, Tokushima	Higashikagawa, Kagawa	43.4	
National Route 319	Sakaide, Kagawa	Shikokuchūō, Ehime	110.4	
National Route 320	Sukumo, Kōchi	Kihoku, Ehime	98.3	
National Route 321	Shimanto, Kōchi	Sukumo, Kōchi	82.3	
National Route 322	Kokurakita-ku, Kitakyūshū	Kurume	87.9	
National Route 323	Saga, Saga	Karatsu, Saga	46.8	
National Route 324	Nagasaki	Uki, Kumamoto	84.4	
National Route 325	Kurume	Takachiho, Miyazaki	138.5	
National Route 326	Nobeoka	Bungo-ōno, Ōita	68.3	
National Route 327	Hyūga, Miyazaki	Aso, Kumamoto	97.5	
National Route 328	Kagoshima	Izumi, Kagoshima	64.4	
National Route 329	Nago	Naha	78.5	
National Route 330	Okinawa, Okinawa	Naha	26.1	
National Route 331	Naha	Ōgimi, Okinawa	150.4	
National Route 332	Naha	Naha	3.1	
National Route 333	Asahikawa, Hokkaidō	Kitami, Hokkaidō	172.1	
National Route 334	Rausu, Hokkaidō	Bihoro, Hokkaidō	123.3	
National Route 335	Rausu, Hokkaidō	Shibetsu, Hokkaidō	42.4	
National Route 336	Urakawa, Hokkaidō	Kushiro	234.6	
National Route 337	Chitose, Hokkaidō	Otaru	92.4	
National Route 338	Hakodate	Oirase, Aomori	219.6	
National Route 339	Hirosaki	Sotogahama	108.4	
National Route 340	Rikuzentakata, Iwate	Hachinohe	253.1	
National Route 341	Kazuno, Akita	Yurihonjō	168.7	
National Route 342	Yokote, Akita	Tome, Miyagi	148.9	
National Route 343	Rikuzentakata, Iwate	Ōshū, Iwate	65.1	
National Route 344	Yuzawa, Akita	Sakata, Yamagata	115	
National Route 345	Chūō-ku, Niigata	Yuza, Yamagata	212	
National Route 346	Aoba-ku, Sendai	Kesennuma, Miyagi	111.6	
National Route 347	Sagae, Yamagata	Ōsaki, Miyagi	90.1	
National Route 348	Nagai, Yamagata	Yamagata, Yamagata	45.3	
National Route 349	Mito, Ibaraki	Shibata, Miyagi	256.3	
National Route 350	Chūō-ku, Niigata	Jōetsu, Niigata	51.9	
National Route 351	Nagaoka, Niigata	Ojiya, Niigata	38.7	
National Route 352	Kashiwazaki, Niigata	Kaminokawa, Tochigi	329	
National Route 353	Kiryū, Gunma	Kashiwazaki, Niigata	187.4	
National Route 354	Takasaki	Hokota, Ibaraki	172.8	
National Route 355	Katori, Chiba	Kasama, Ibaraki	73.8	
National Route 356	Chōshi	Abiko, Chiba	91.7	
National Route 357	Chūō-ku, Chiba	Yokosuka	70	
National Route 358	Fujikawaguchiko, Yamanashi	Kōfu, Yamanashi	28.5	
National Route 359	Toyama, Toyama	Kanazawa	56.2	
National Route 360	Toyama, Toyama	Komatsu, Ishikawa	128.3	
National Route 361	Takayama, Gifu	Ina, Nagano	131.7	
National Route 362	Toyokawa, Aichi	Aoi-ku, Shizuoka	157.2	
National Route 363	Meito-ku, Nagoya	Nakatsugawa, Gifu	80.2	
National Route 364	Ōno, Fukui	Kaga, Ishikawa	62.8	
National Route 365	Kaga, Ishikawa	Yokkaichi	229.4	
National Route 366	Handa, Aichi	Atsuta-ku, Nagoya	20.1	
National Route 367	Shimogyō-ku, Kyoto	Wakasa, Fukui	68.5	
National Route 368	Iga, Mie	Taki, Mie	74.5	
National Route 369	Nara, Nara	Matsusaka	122.3	
National Route 370	Kainan, Wakayama	Nara, Nara	133.2	
National Route 371	Kawachinagano, Osaka	Kushimoto, Wakayama	199.6	
National Route 372	Kameoka, Kyoto	Himeji	102	
National Route 373	Akō, Hyōgo	Tottori, Tottori	101.9	
National Route 374	Bizen, Okayama	Tsuyama	58	
National Route 375	Kure, Hiroshima	Ōda, Shimane	163.4	
National Route 376	Yamaguchi, Yamaguchi	Iwakuni	68.1	
National Route 377	Naruto, Tokushima	Kan'onji, Kagawa	129.9	
National Route 378	Iyo, Ehime	Uwajima, Ehime	124.1	
National Route 379	Matsuyama	Uchiko, Ehime	53.8	
National Route 380	Yawatahama, Ehime	Kumakōgen, Ehime	66.8	
National Route 381	Susaki, Kōchi	Uwajima, Ehime	115.6	
National Route 382	Tsushima, Nagasaki	Karatsu, Saga	125.2	
National Route 383	Hirado, Nagasaki	Imari, Saga	75.8	
National Route 384	Gotō, Nagasaki	Sasebo	91.7	
National Route 385	Yanagawa, Fukuoka	Hakata-ku, Fukuoka	68.1	
National Route 386	Hita, Ōita	Chikushino, Fukuoka	46.6	
National Route 387	Usa, Ōita	Kita-ku, Kumamoto	132.6	
National Route 388	Saiki, Ōita	Yunomae, Kumamoto	229.4	
National Route 389	Ōmuta, Fukuoka	Akune, Kagoshima	155.4	
National Route 390	Ishigaki, Okinawa	Naha	58.2	
National Route 391	Kushiro	Abashiri	152.6	
National Route 392	Kushiro	Honbetsu, Hokkaidō	83.6	
National Route 393	Otaru	Kutchan, Hokkaidō	51.7	
National Route 394	Mutsu, Aomori	Hirosaki	185	
National Route 395	Kuji, Iwate	Ninohe, Iwate	58.6	
National Route 396	Tōno, Iwate	Morioka	58.7	
National Route 397	Ōfunato, Iwate	Yokote, Akita	137.8	
National Route 398	Ishinomaki	Yurihonjō	273.6	
National Route 399	Iwaki, Fukushima	Nan'yō, Yamagata	179.4	
National Route 400	Mito, Ibaraki	Nishiaizu, Fukushima	225.7	
National Route 401	Aizuwakamatsu	Numata, Gunma	171.1	
National Route 402	Kashiwazaki, Niigata	Chūō-ku, Niigata	89	
National Route 403	Chūō-ku, Niigata	Matsumoto, Nagano	352.8	
National Route 404	Nagaoka, Niigata	Jōetsu, Niigata	95.7	
National Route 405	Nakanojō, Gunma	Jōetsu, Niigata	109.6	
National Route 406	Ōmachi, Nagano	Takasaki	192.5	
National Route 407	Ashikaga, Tochigi	Iruma, Saitama	60.4	
National Route 408	Narita, Chiba	Takanezawa, Tochigi	116.9	
National Route 409	Takatsu-ku, Kawasaki	Narita, Chiba	119.3	Tokyo Bay Aqua-Line
National Route 410	Tateyama, Chiba	Kisarazu	100.8	
National Route 411	Hachiōji, Tokyo	Kōfu, Yamanashi	118.5	
National Route 412	Hiratsuka	Sagamihara	48.6	
National Route 413	Fujiyoshida	Sagamihara	71.7	
National Route 414	Shimoda, Shizuoka	Numazu, Shizuoka	73.7	
National Route 415	Hakui, Ishikawa	Toyama, Toyama	68.1	
National Route 416	Fukui, Fukui	Komatsu, Ishikawa	86.3	
National Route 417	Ōgaki, Gifu	Minamiechizen, Fukui	143	
National Route 418	Ōno, Fukui	Iida, Nagano	243.3	
National Route 419	Mizunami, Gifu	Takahama, Aichi	62.4	
National Route 420	Toyota, Aichi	Shinshiro, Aichi	66.5	
National Route 421	Kuwana, Mie	Ōmihachiman, Shiga	72	
National Route 422	Ōtsu, Shiga	Kihoku, Mie	163	
National Route 423	Kita-ku, Osaka	Kameoka, Kyoto	53.5	
National Route 424	Tanabe, Wakayama	Kinokawa, Wakayama	118.4	
National Route 425	Owase, Mie	Gobō, Wakayama	206.2	
National Route 426	Toyooka, Hyōgo	Fukuchiyama, Kyoto	49.6	
National Route 427	Akashi, Hyōgo	Asago, Hyōgo	96.9	
National Route 428	Chūō-ku, Kobe	Miki, Hyōgo	34.4	
National Route 429	Kurashiki	Fukuchiyama, Kyoto	254.4	
National Route 430	Kurashiki	Tamano, Okayama	38.9	
National Route 431	Izumo, Shimane	Yonago	93.5	
National Route 432	Takehara, Hiroshima	Matsue, Shimane	211	
National Route 433	Ōtake, Hiroshima	Miyoshi, Hiroshima	130.5	
National Route 434	Shūnan	Miyoshi, Hiroshima	166.9	
National Route 435	Yamaguchi, Yamaguchi	Shimonoseki	73.8	
National Route 436	Himeji	Takamatsu	33.4	
National Route 437	Matsuyama	Iwakuni	61.7	
National Route 438	Tokushima, Tokushima	Sakaide, Kagawa	163	
National Route 439	Tokushima, Tokushima	Shimanto, Kōchi	341.2	
National Route 440	Matsuyama	Yusuhara, Kōchi	96.2	
National Route 441	Ōzu, Ehime	Shimanto, Kōchi	110.9	
National Route 442	Ōita, Ōita	Ōkawa, Fukuoka	162.2	
National Route 443	Ōkawa, Fukuoka	Hikawa, Kumamoto	124.9	
National Route 444	Ōmura, Nagasaki	Saga, Saga	73.5	
National Route 445	Chūō-ku, Kumamoto	Hitoyoshi, Kumamoto	136.1	
National Route 446	Hyūga, Miyazaki	Yunomae, Kumamoto	103.3	
National Route 447	Ebino, Miyazaki	Izumi, Kagoshima	60.4	
National Route 448	Ibusuki, Kagoshima	Miyazaki, Miyazaki	231.1	
National Route 449	Motobu, Okinawa	Nago	20.3	
National Route 450	Asahikawa, Hokkaidō	Monbetsu, Hokkaidō	29.2	Asahikawa-Monbetsu Expressway
National Route 451	Rumoi, Hokkaidō	Takikawa, Hokkaidō	116.5	
National Route 452	Yūbari, Hokkaidō	Asahikawa, Hokkaidō	124.4	
National Route 453	Toyohira-ku, Sapporo	Date, Hokkaidō	123.5	
National Route 454	Hachinohe	Owani, Aomori	116.9	
National Route 455	Morioka	Iwaizumi, Iwate	104.4	
National Route 456	Morioka	Motoyoshi, Miyagi	154.5	
National Route 457	Ichinoseki, Iwate	Shiroishi, Miyagi	173.9	
National Route 458	Shinjō, Yamagata	Kaminoyama, Yamagata	112.5	
National Route 459	Chūō-ku, Niigata	Namie, Fukushima	267.8	
National Route 460	Shibata, Niigata	Kashiwazaki, Niigata	120.5	
National Route 461	Nikkō	Takahagi, Ibaraki	135	
National Route 462	Saku, Nagano	Isesaki, Gunma	114.6	
National Route 463	Koshigaya, Saitama	Iruma, Saitama	43.8	
National Route 464	Matsudo, Chiba	Narita, Chiba	46.9	
National Route 465	Mobara, Chiba	Futtsu, Chiba	112.3	
National Route 466	Setagaya, Tokyo	Hodogaya-ku, Yokohama	18.4	Daisan Keihin Road
National Route 467	Yamato, Kanagawa	Fujisawa, Kanagawa	21.6	
National Route 468	Kanazawa-ku, Yokohama	Kisarazu	38.5	Ken-Ō Expressway
National Route 469	Gotemba, Shizuoka	Nanbu, Yamanashi	59.1	
National Route 470	Wajima, Ishikawa	Tonami, Toyama	19.4	Nōetsu Expressway
National Route 471	Hakui, Ishikawa	Takayama, Gifu	181.6	
National Route 472	Imizu, Toyama	Gujō, Gifu	185.8	
National Route 473	Gamagōri, Aichi	Makinohara, Shizuoka	247.8	
National Route 474	Iida, Nagano	Hamana-ku, Hamamatsu	8.3	San En Nanshin Expressway
National Route 475	Toyota, Aichi	Yokkaichi	73.0	Tōkai-Kanjō Expressway
National Route 476	Ōno, Fukui	Tsuruga, Fukui	76.2	
National Route 477	Yokkaichi	Ikeda, Osaka	217.6	
National Route 478	Miyazu, Kyoto	Kumiyama, Kyoto	63.9	Kyoto-Jukan Expressway
National Route 479	Toyonaka, Osaka	Suminoe-ku, Osaka	28.6	
National Route 480	Izumi, Osaka	Arida, Wakayama	143.6	
National Route 481	Izumisano, Osaka	Izumisano, Osaka	5.8	Kansai-kūkō Expressway
National Route 482	Miyazu, Kyoto	Yonago	324.7	
National Route 483	Toyooka, Hyōgo	Tamba, Hyōgo	11.6	Kitakinki-Toyooka Expressway
National Route 484	Bizen, Okayama	Takahashi, Okayama	93.9	
National Route 485	Okinoshima, Shimane	Matsue, Shimane	67.5	
National Route 486	Sōja, Okayama	Higashihiroshima, Hiroshima	130.8	
National Route 487	Kure, Hiroshima	Minami-ku, Hiroshima	50.3	
National Route 488	Masuda, Shimane	Hatsukaichi, Hiroshima	108.9	
National Route 489	Shūnan	Yamaguchi, Yamaguchi	44.8	
National Route 490	Ube, Yamaguchi	Hagi, Yamaguchi	62.4	
National Route 491	Shimonoseki	Nagato, Yamaguchi	53.4	
National Route 492	Takamatsu	Ōtoyo, Kōchi	166.9	
National Route 493	Kōchi, Kōchi	Tōyō, Kōchi	98.3	
National Route 494	Matsuyama	Susaki, Kōchi	120.7	
National Route 495	Wakamatsu-ku, Kitakyūshū	Higashi-ku, Fukuoka	63.4	
National Route 496	Yukuhashi, Fukuoka	Hita, Ōita	68.9	
National Route 497	Hakata-ku, Fukuoka	Takeo, Saga	63.5	Nishikyūshū Expressway
National Route 498	Kashima, Saga	Sasebo	56.6	
National Route 499	Nagasaki	Akune, Kagoshima	27.7	
National Route 500	Beppu	Tosu, Saga	160.9	
National Route 501	Ōmuta, Fukuoka	Uto, Kumamoto	47.1	
National Route 502	Usuki, Ōita	Taketa, Ōita	53.3	
National Route 503	Takamori, Kumamoto	Hyūga, Miyazaki	112.7	
National Route 504	Kanoya, Kagoshima	Izumi, Kagoshima	145.1	
National Route 505	Motobu, Okinawa	Nago	21.1	
National Route 506	Naha	Nishihara, Okinawa	8.5	Naha Airport Expressway
National Route 507	Itoman, Okinawa	Naha	26.5	
