= Roadside station =

Japanese rest area along roads and highways

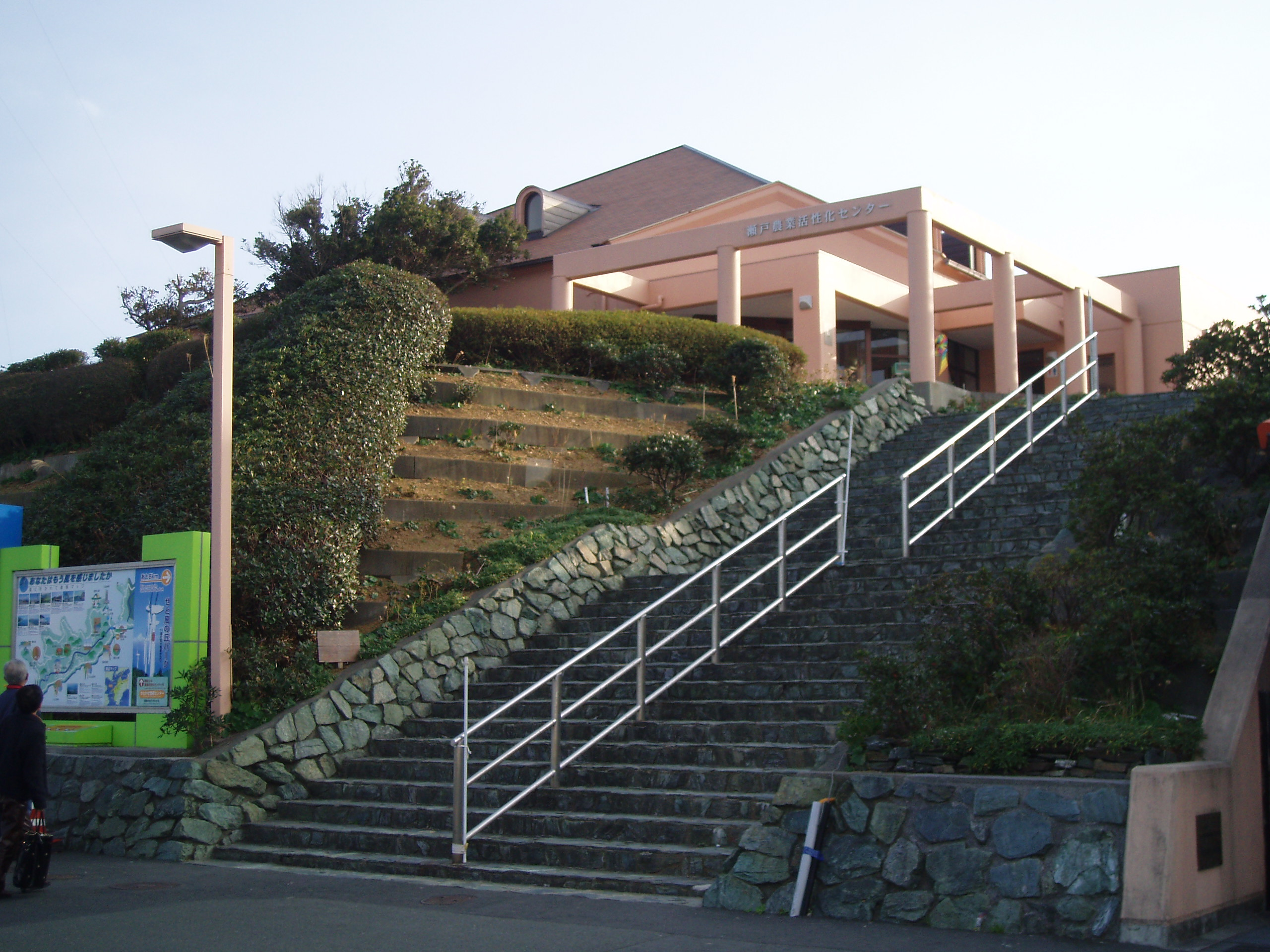
Seto Agriculture Park, a roadside station in Ikata, Ehime

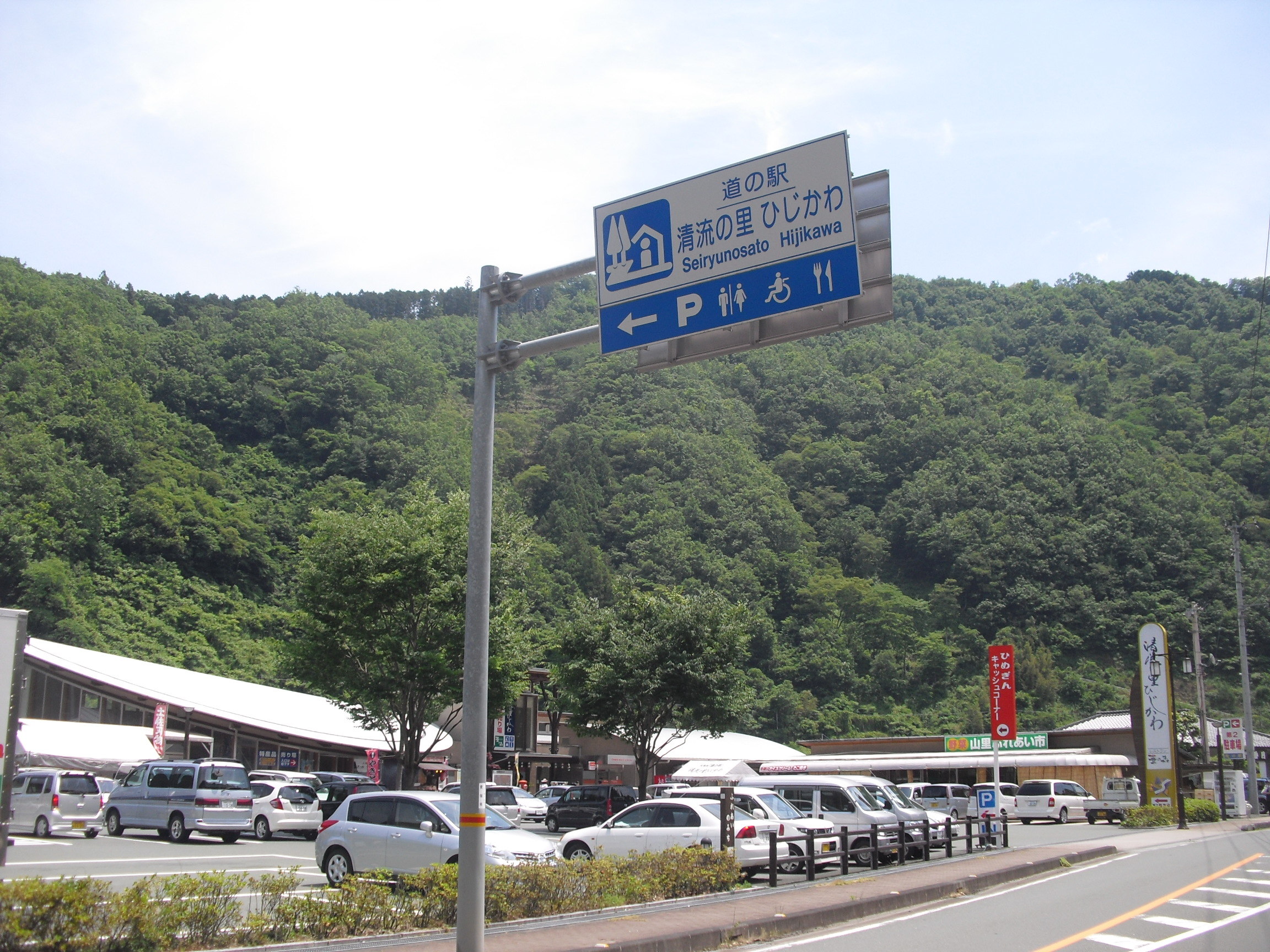
Roadside Station Seiryunosato Hijikawa (道の駅 清流の里ひじかわ) in Ehime

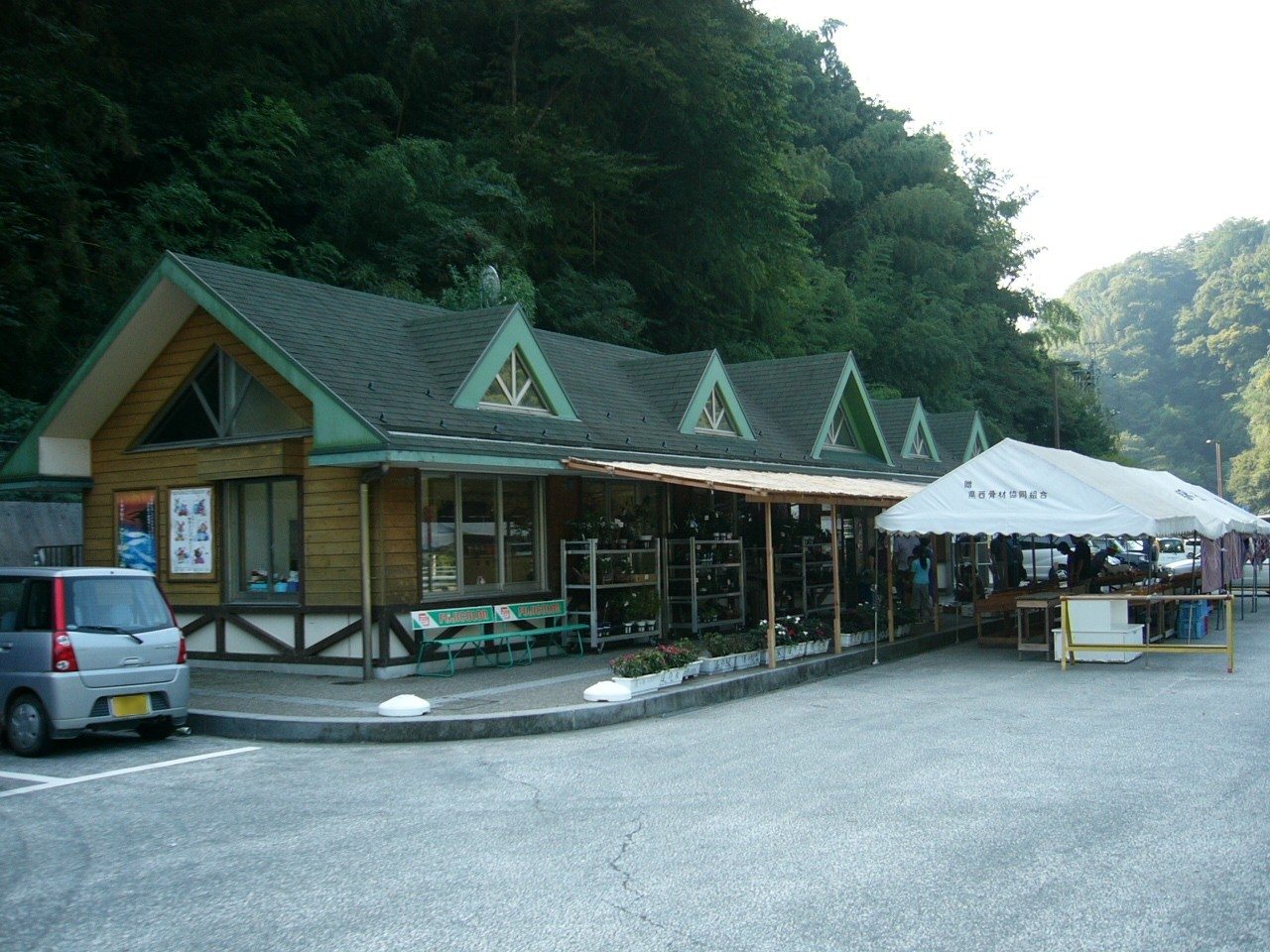
Roadside station in Yamakita, Kanagawa

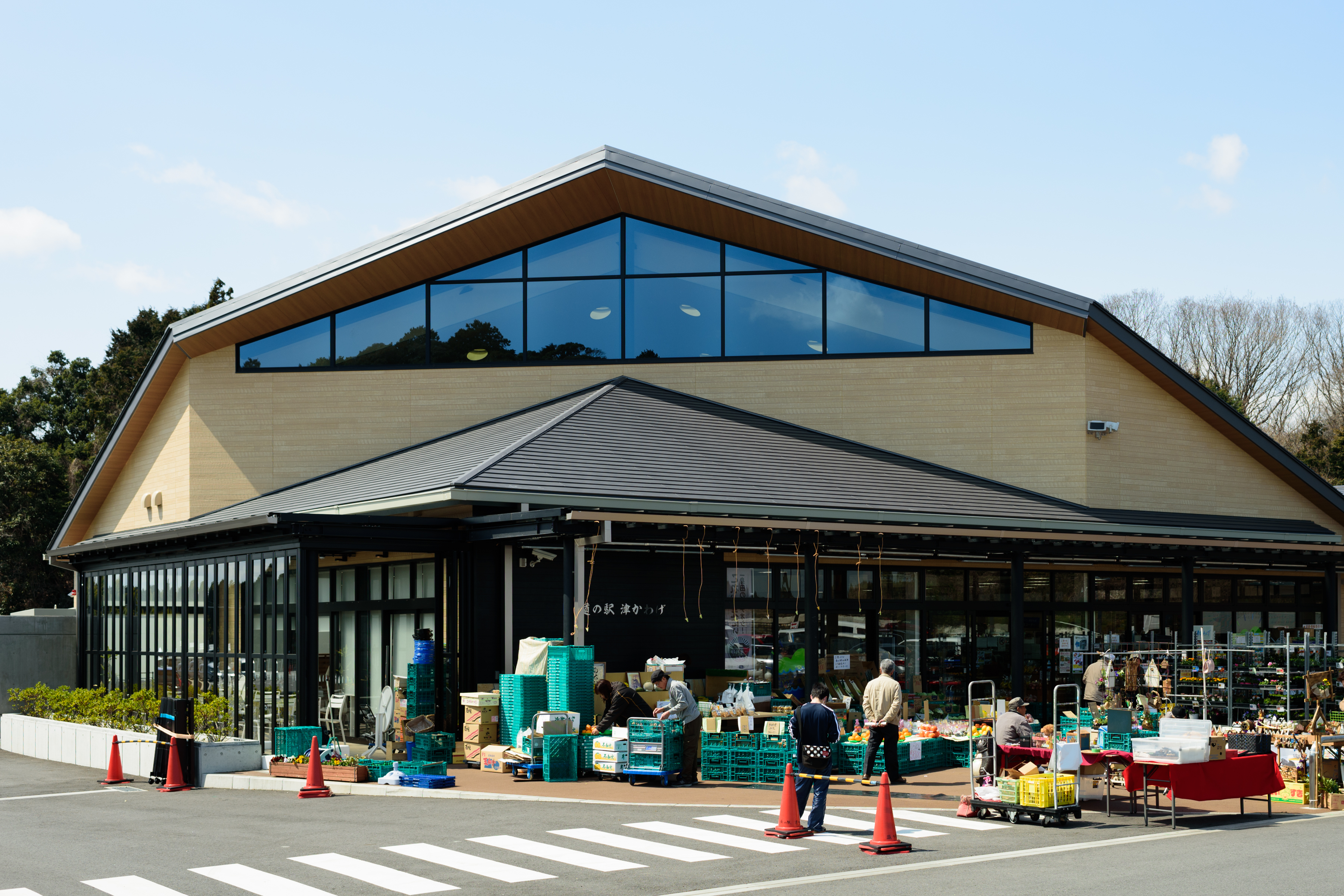
Roadside station Tsu Kawage in Tsu, Mie

A roadside station (道の駅, Michi no eki) is a government-designated rest area found along roads and highways in Japan. Unlike Service Areas and Parking Areas, they are not on tolled expressways and can be accessed by anyone.

In addition to providing places for travelers to rest, they are intended to promote local tourism and trade. Shops may sell local produce, snacks, souvenirs, and other goods. All roadside stations provide 24-hour access to parking, public toilets, directional and tourism information, and other facilities.

As of August 2024, there are 1221 roadside stations across Japan: 128 in Hokkaido, 175 in the Tōhoku region, 188 in the Kantō region, 84 in the Hokuriku region, 136 in the Chūbu region, 158 in the Kansai (Kinki) region, 108 in the Chūgoku region, 91 in Shikoku, and 153 across both Kyushu and Okinawa.

== History ==
The concept for roadside stations came from a January 1990 symposium held by the Ministry of Construction's Chugoku Regional Construction Bureau: one of the participants suggested that roads could have stations in the same way that railways do. Experiments began in October of 1991 in Yamaguchi Prefecture, Tochigi Prefecture, and Gifu Prefecture, and the system for roadside stations was officially established on February 23, 1993. The first registrations were in April of 1993, resulting in 103 initial roadside stations.

On April 1, 2014, the Order on Road Sign, Road Line, and Road Surface Marking was revised to include road signs with directional markers for roadside stations.

On January 30, 2015, a system for "priority roadside stations" was established. The purpose of the system is to provide priority support to roadside stations that are deemed excellent in order to assist with regional revitalization. Priority roadside stations are divided into three categories:

- National Model Roadside Stations: roadside stations which continuously demonstrate outstanding regional revitalization abilities;
- Priority Roadside Stations: roadside stations that have excellent plans for regional revitalization, and are expected to be effective in the future with the assistance of priority support;
- Priority Roadside Station Candidates: roadside stations with the potential to become priority roadside stations.

Initially, 6 stations were designated National Model Roadside Stations, 35 were designated Priority Roadside Stations, and 49 were designated Priority Roadside Station Candidates.

=== Registered roadside stations by year ===
Year	Total number of roadside stations	Registrations (deregistrations)	Change
1993	115	115 (0) (Note: In addition to the initial 103 roadside stations, 12 more stations were registered in the first year)	
1994	175	60 (0)	+60
1995	233	58 (0)	+58
1996	313	80 (0)	+80
1997	390	77 (0)	+77
1998	470	80 (0)	+80
1999	551	81 (0)	+81
2000	610	59 (0)	+59
2001	649	49 (0)	+49
2002	701	52 (0)	+52
2003	743	42 (0)	+42
2004	785	43 (1)	+42
2005	830	45 (0)	+45
2006	845	15 (0)	+15
2007	868	23 (0)	+23
2008	887	42 (0)	+42
2009	917	30 (0)	+30
2010	952	35 (0)	+35
2011	977	25 (0)	+25
2012	996	19 (0)	+19
2013	1,014	19 (1)	+18
2014	1,040	26 (0)	+26
2015	1,079	39 (0)	+39
2016	1,107	67 (0)	+67
2017	1,134	36 (0)	+36
2018	1,145	11 (0)	+11
2019	1,160	15 (0)	+15
2020	1,180	20 (0)	+20
2021	1,193	13 (0)	+13
2022	1,198	7 (2)	+5
2023	1,209	11 (0)	+11
2024	1,221	12 (0)	+12
