= Japan National Route 198 =

National highway in Japan

National Route 198
- 国道198号
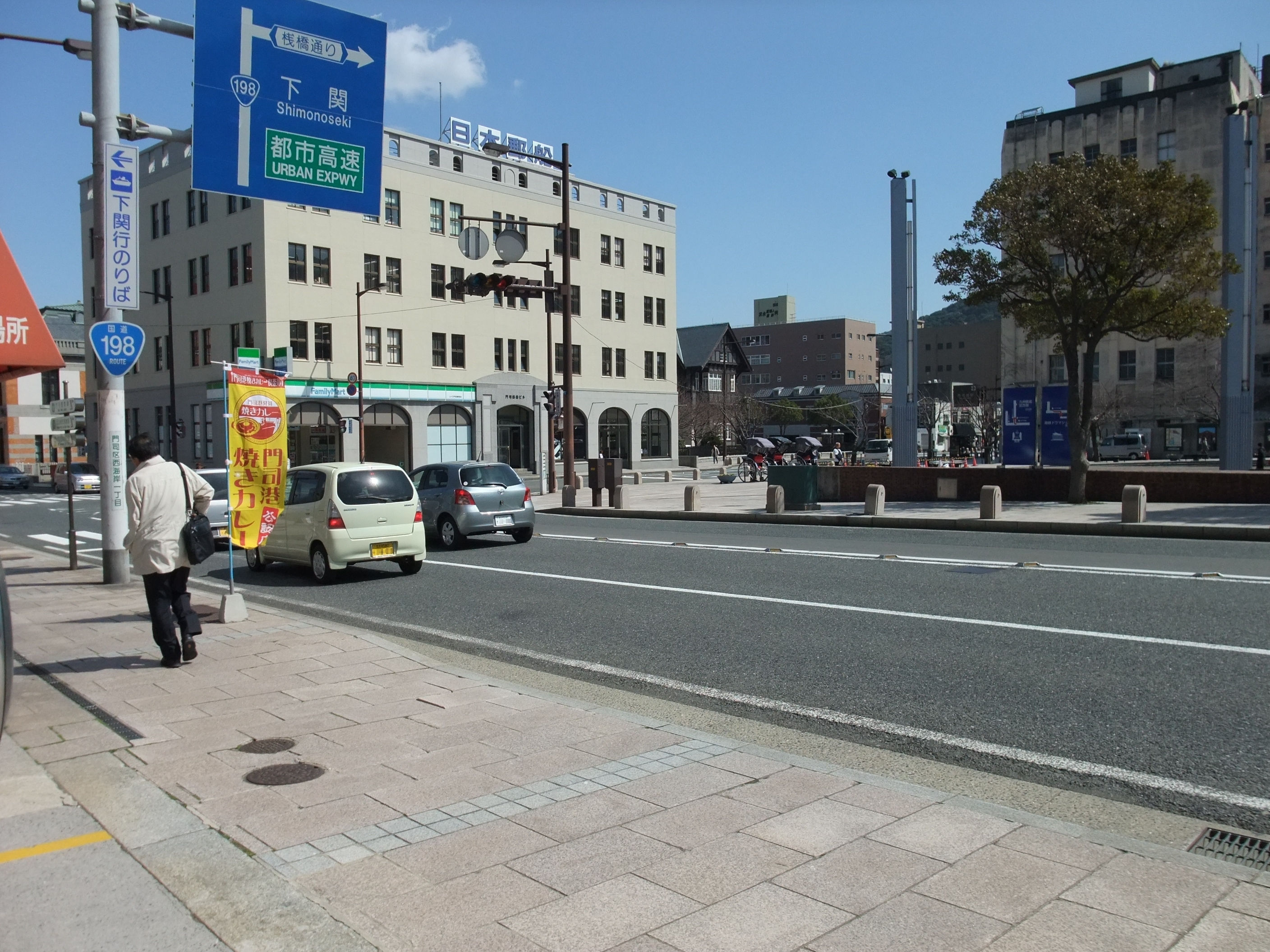

Route information
- Length: 0.6 km (0.37 mi; 2,000 ft)
- Existed: 18 May 1953–present

Major junctions
- West end: National Route 199 at Port of Moji
- East end: National Route 3 at Moji-ku, Kitakyushu

Location
- Country: Japan

Highway system
- National highways of Japan; Expressways of Japan
← National Route 197	→ National Route 199

National Route 198 is a short national highway of Japan connecting Moji-ku, Kitakyūshū and Moji-ku, Kitakyūshū in Japan, with a total length of 0.6 km (0.37 mi).
