= Japan National Route 321 =

National highway in Japan

National Route 321
- 国道321号
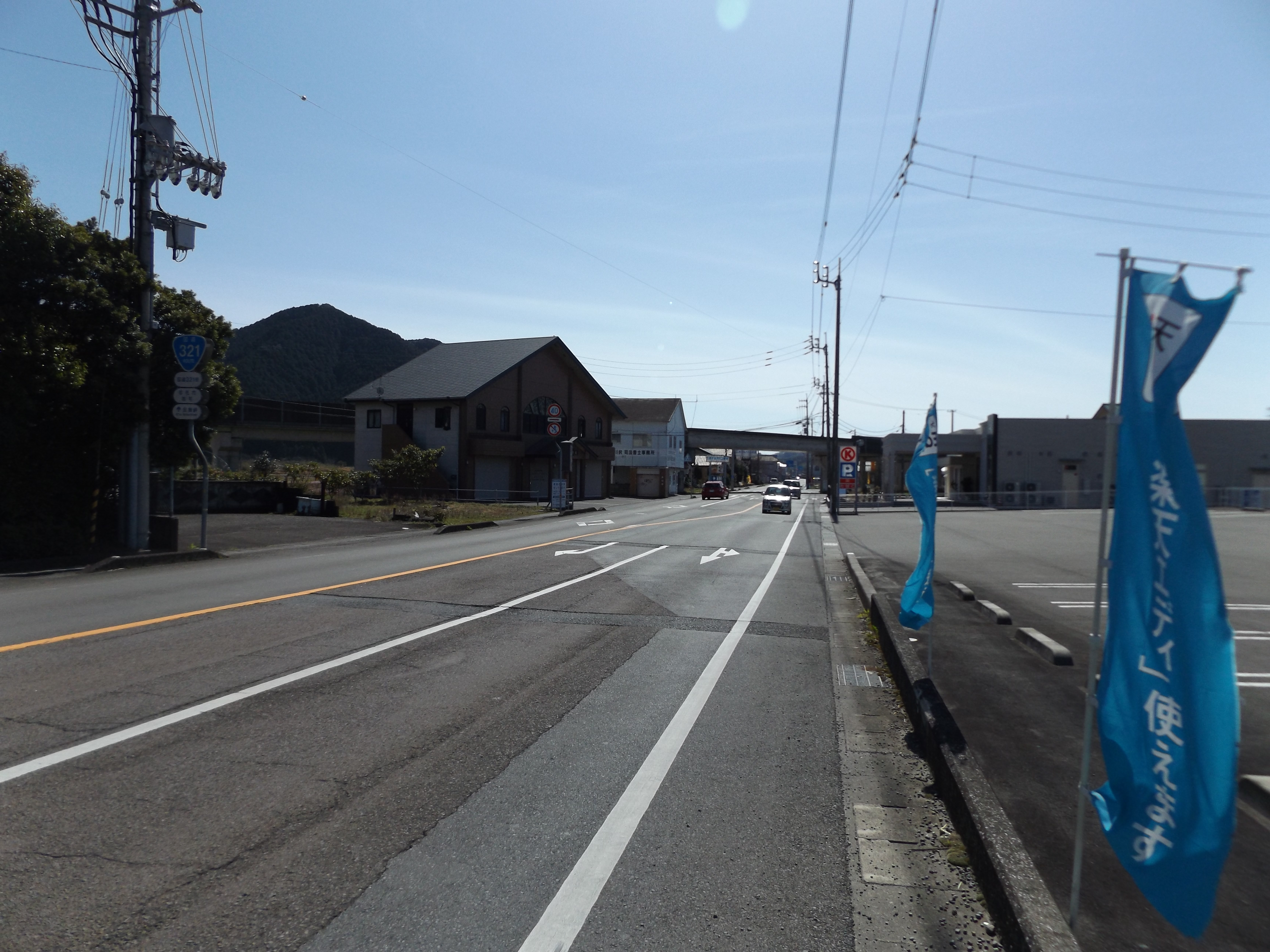

Route information
- Length: 82.3 km (51.1 mi)

Location
- Country: Japan

Highway system
- National highways of Japan; Expressways of Japan
← National Route 320	→ National Route 322

National Route 321 is a national highway of Japan connecting Shimanto and Sukumo in Kochi prefecture, with a total length of 82.3 km (51.14 mi).
