= Japan National Route 380 =

Road in Ehime prefecture, Japan

National Route 380
- 国道380号

Route information
- Length: 66.8 km (41.5 mi)

Location
- Country: Japan

Highway system
- National highways of Japan; Expressways of Japan
← National Route 379	→ National Route 381

National Route 380 is a national highway of Japan connecting Yawatahama, Ehime and Kumakōgen, Ehime in Japan, with a total length of 66.8 km (41.51 mi).
