= Japan National Route 441 =

Road in Japan

National Route 441
- 国道441号
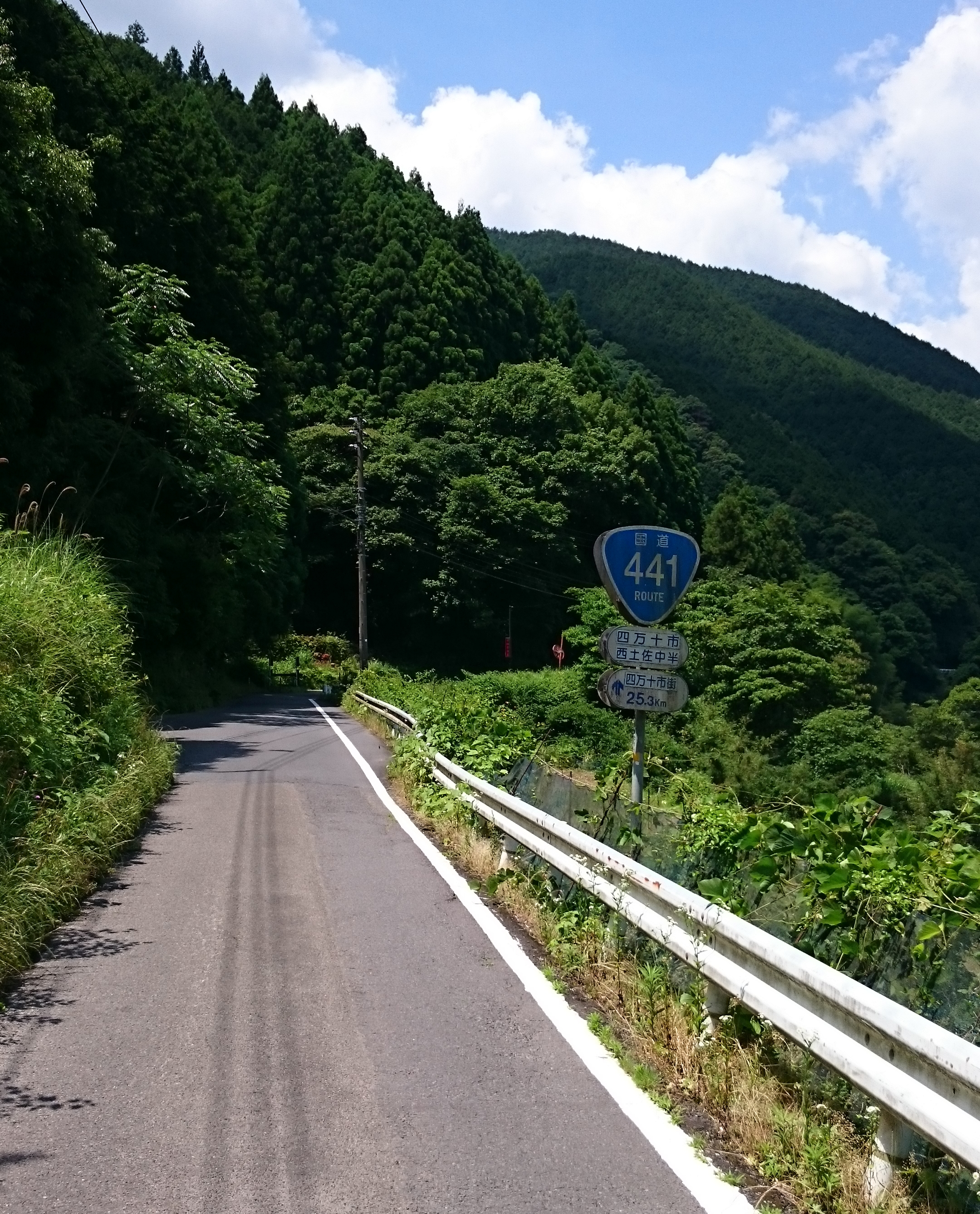

Route information
- Length: 110.9 km (68.9 mi)

Location
- Country: Japan

Highway system
- National highways of Japan; Expressways of Japan
← National Route 440	→ National Route 442

National Route 441 is a national highway of Japan connecting Ōzu, Ehime and Shimanto, Kōchi in Japan, with a total length of 110.9 km (68.91 mi).
