= Japan National Route 199 =

Road in Fukuoka prefecture, Japan

National Route 199
- 国道199号
- Japan National Route 199 highlighted in red
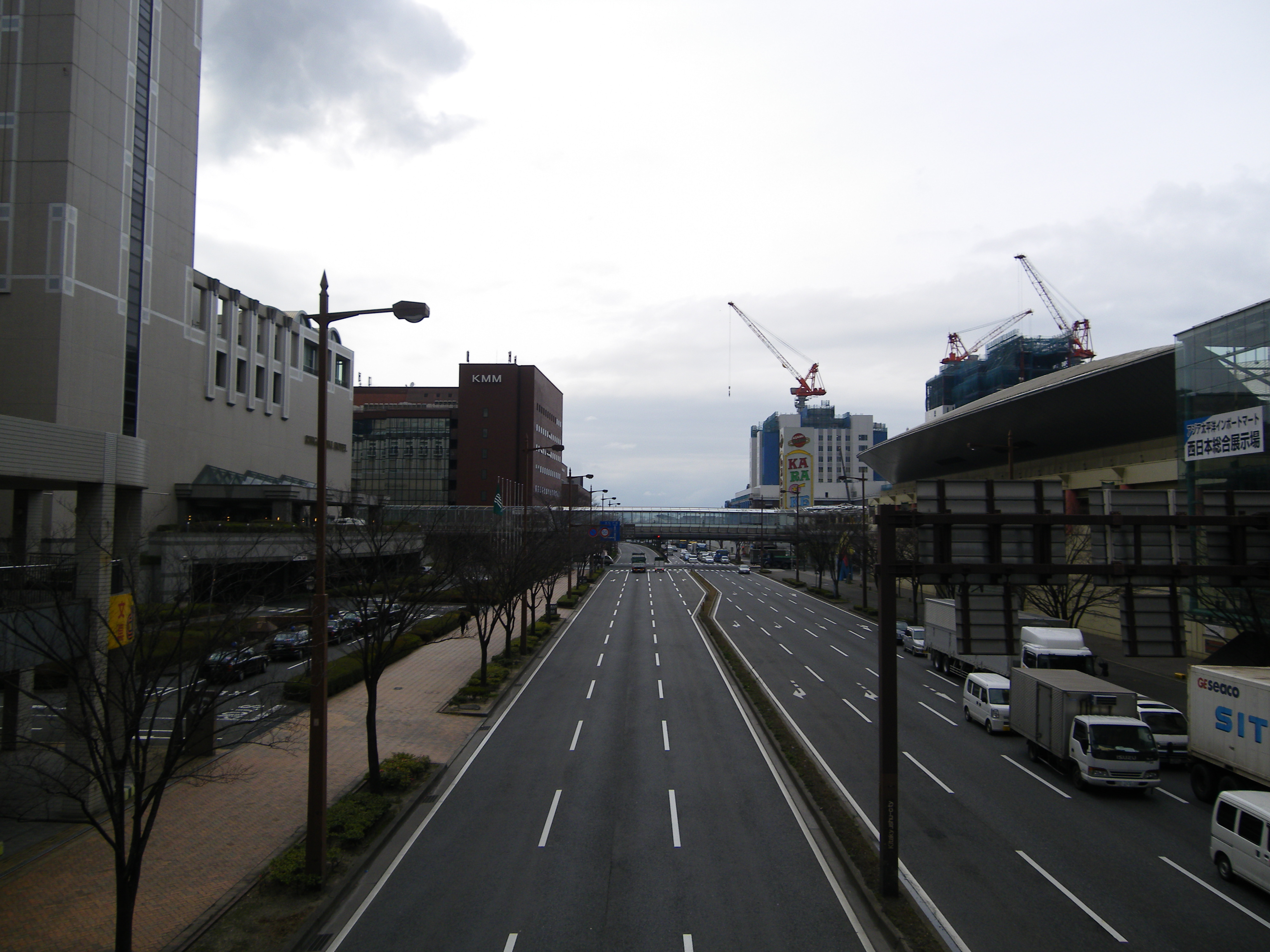

Route information
- Length: 33.2 km (20.6 mi)
- Existed: 18 May 1953–present

Major junctions
- West end: National Route 3 in Moji-ku, Kitakyūshū
- East end: National Route 3 in Yahatanishi-ku, Kitakyūshū

Location
- Country: Japan

Highway system
- National highways of Japan; Expressways of Japan
← National Route 198	→ National Route 200

National Route 199 is a national highway of Japan connecting Moji-ku, Kitakyūshū and Yahatanishi-ku, Kitakyūshū in Japan, with a total length of 33.2 km (20.63 mi).
