= Japan National Route 438 =

National highway in Japan

National Route 438
- 国道438号
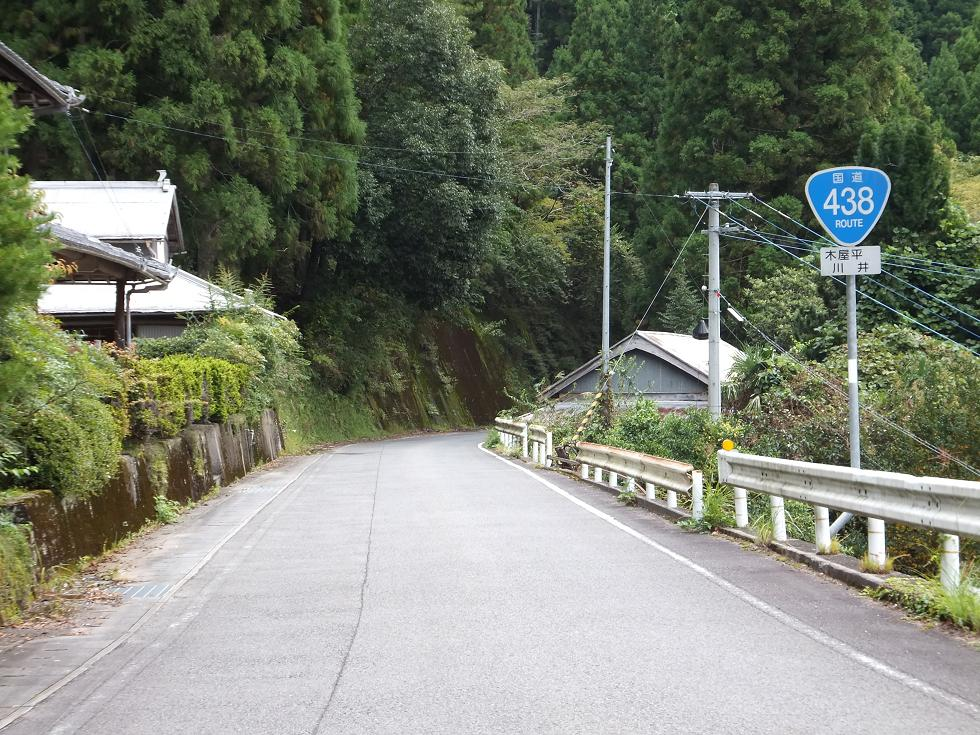

Route information
- Length: 163 km (101 mi)

Location
- Country: Japan

Highway system
- National highways of Japan; Expressways of Japan
← National Route 437	→ National Route 439

National Route 438 is a national highway of Japan connecting Tokushima, Tokushima and Sakaide, Kagawa in Japan, with a total length of 163 km (101.28 mi).
