= Japan National Route 442 =

Road in Japan

National Route 442
- 国道442号

Route information
- Length: 162.2 km (100.8 mi)

Major junctions
- East end: National Route 10 / National Route 57 / National Route 197 / National Route 217 in Ōita, Ōita
- West end: National Route 208 in Ōkawa, Fukuoka

Location
- Country: Japan

Highway system
- National highways of Japan; Expressways of Japan
← National Route 441	→ National Route 443

National Route 442 is a national highway of Japan connecting Ōita, Ōita and Ōkawa, Fukuoka in Japan, with a total length of 162.2 km (100.79 mi).
