= Japan National Route 319 =

Road in Japan

National Route 319
- 国道319号
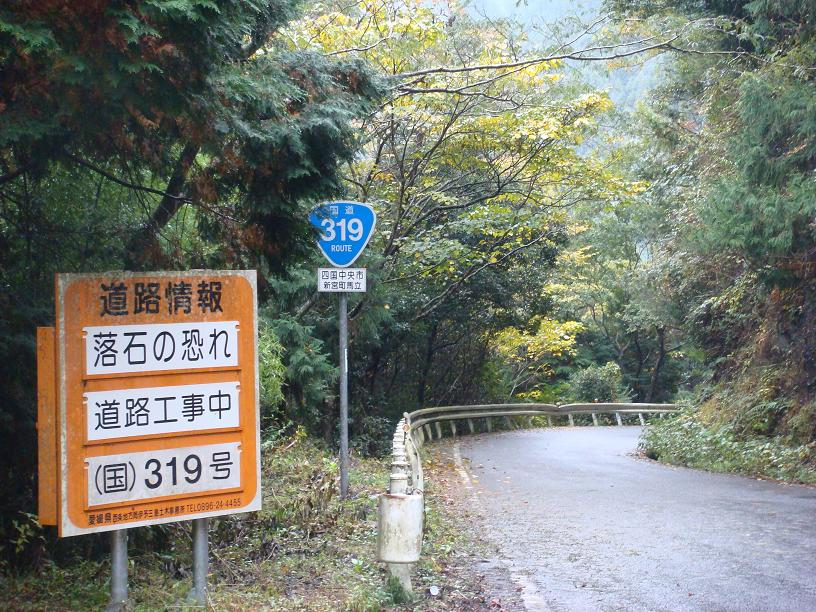

Route information
- Length: 110.4 km (68.6 mi)

Location
- Country: Japan

Highway system
- National highways of Japan; Expressways of Japan
← National Route 318	→ National Route 320

National Route 319 is a national highway of Japan connecting Sakaide, Kagawa and Shikokuchūō, Ehime in Japan, with a total length of 110.4 km (68.6 mi).
