= Japan National Route 317 =

National highway of Japan

National Route 317
- 国道317号
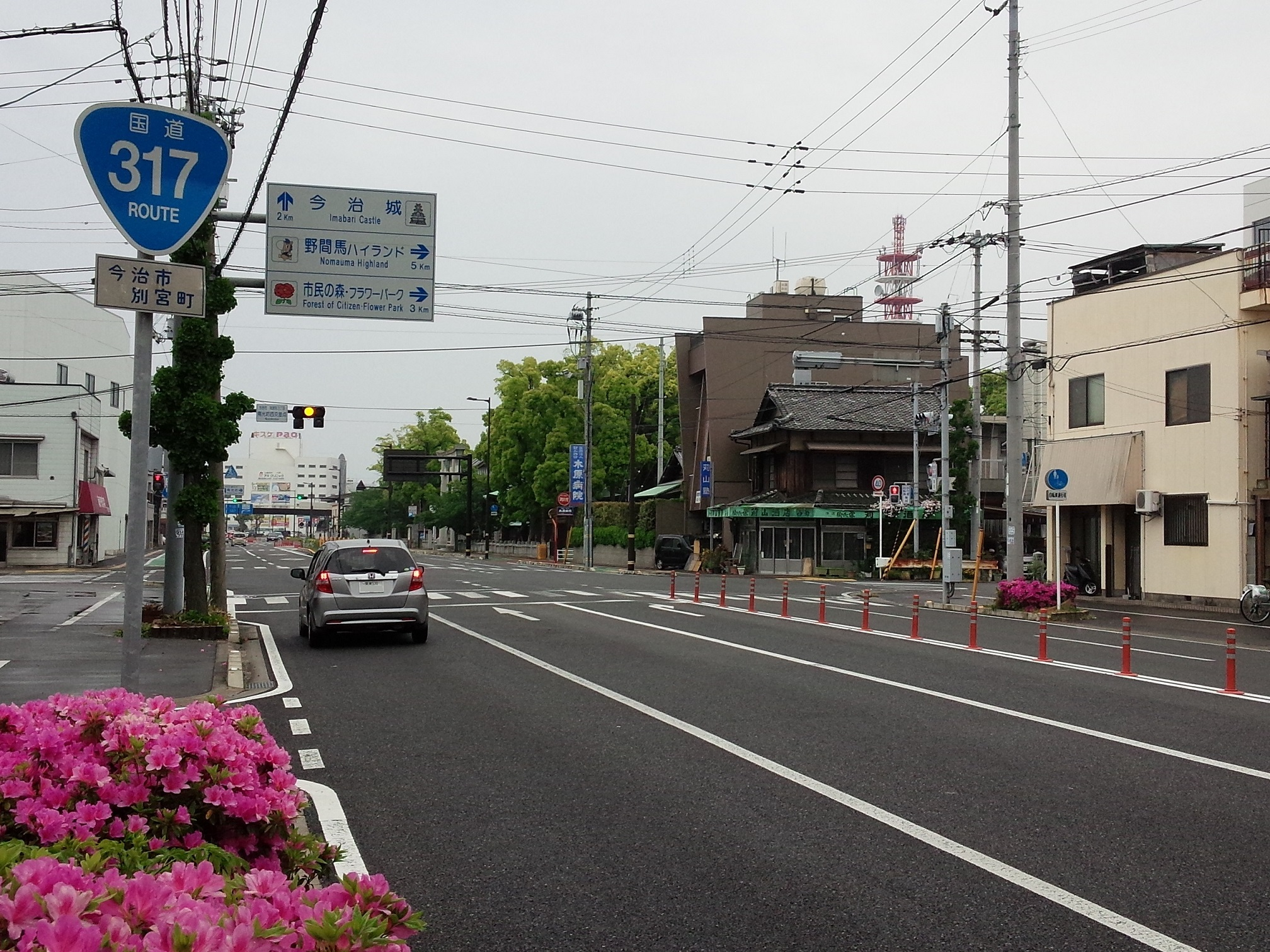

Route information
- Length: 99.2 km (61.6 mi)

Location
- Country: Japan

Highway system
- National highways of Japan; Expressways of Japan
← National Route 316	→ National Route 318

National Route 317 is a national highway of Japan connecting Matsuyama, Ehime and Onomichi, Hiroshima in Japan, with a total length of 99.2 km (61.64 mi).
