= Japan National Route 322 =

Road in Japan

National Route 322
- 国道322号
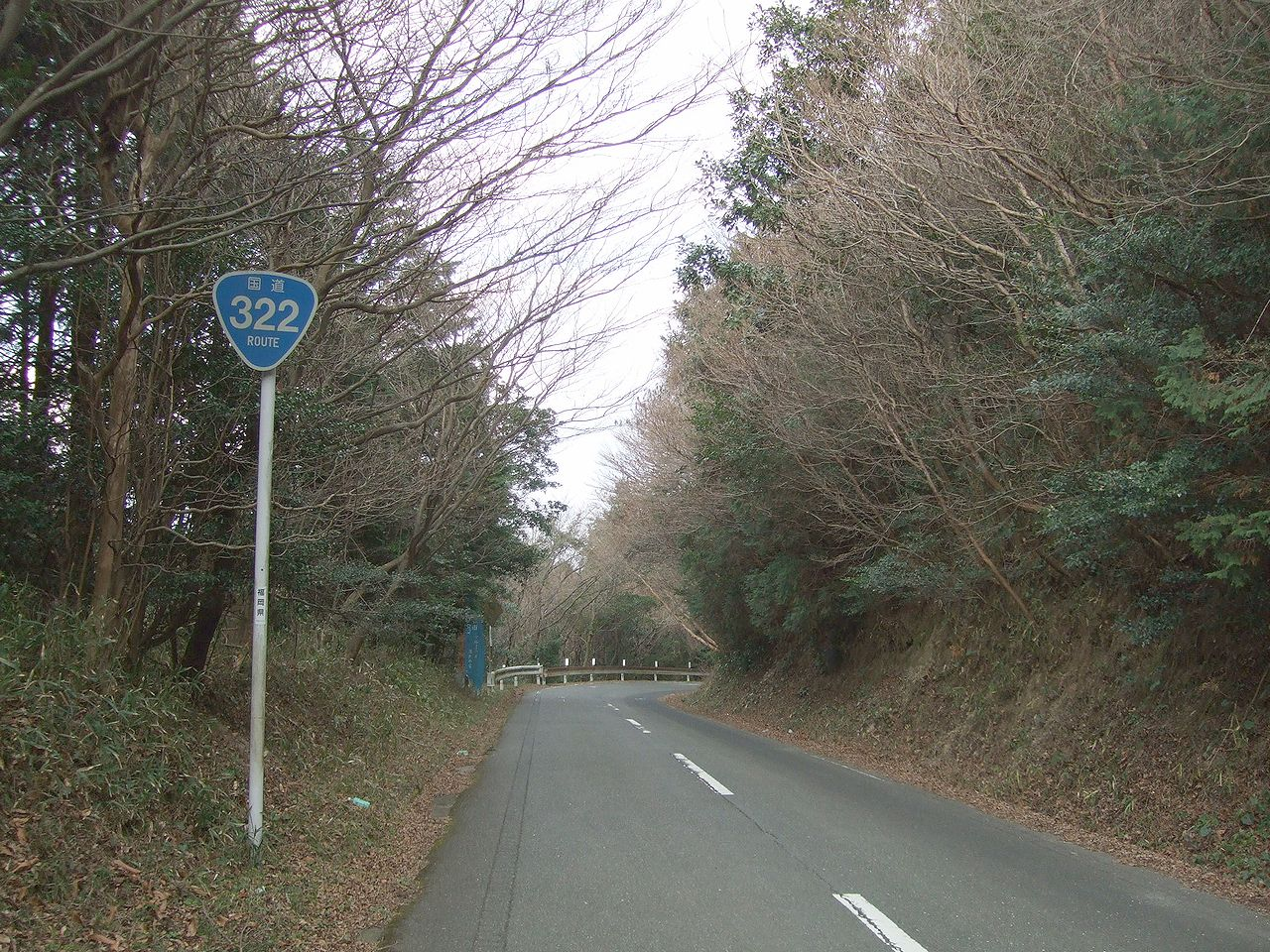

Route information
- Length: 87.9 km (54.6 mi)

Location
- Country: Japan

Highway system
- National highways of Japan; Expressways of Japan
← National Route 321	→ National Route 323

National Route 322 is a national highway of Japan connecting Kokura Kita-ku, Kitakyūshū and Kurume, Fukuoka in Japan, with a total length of 87.9 km (54.62 mi).
