= Japan National Route 446 =

Road in Japan

National Route 446
- 国道446号
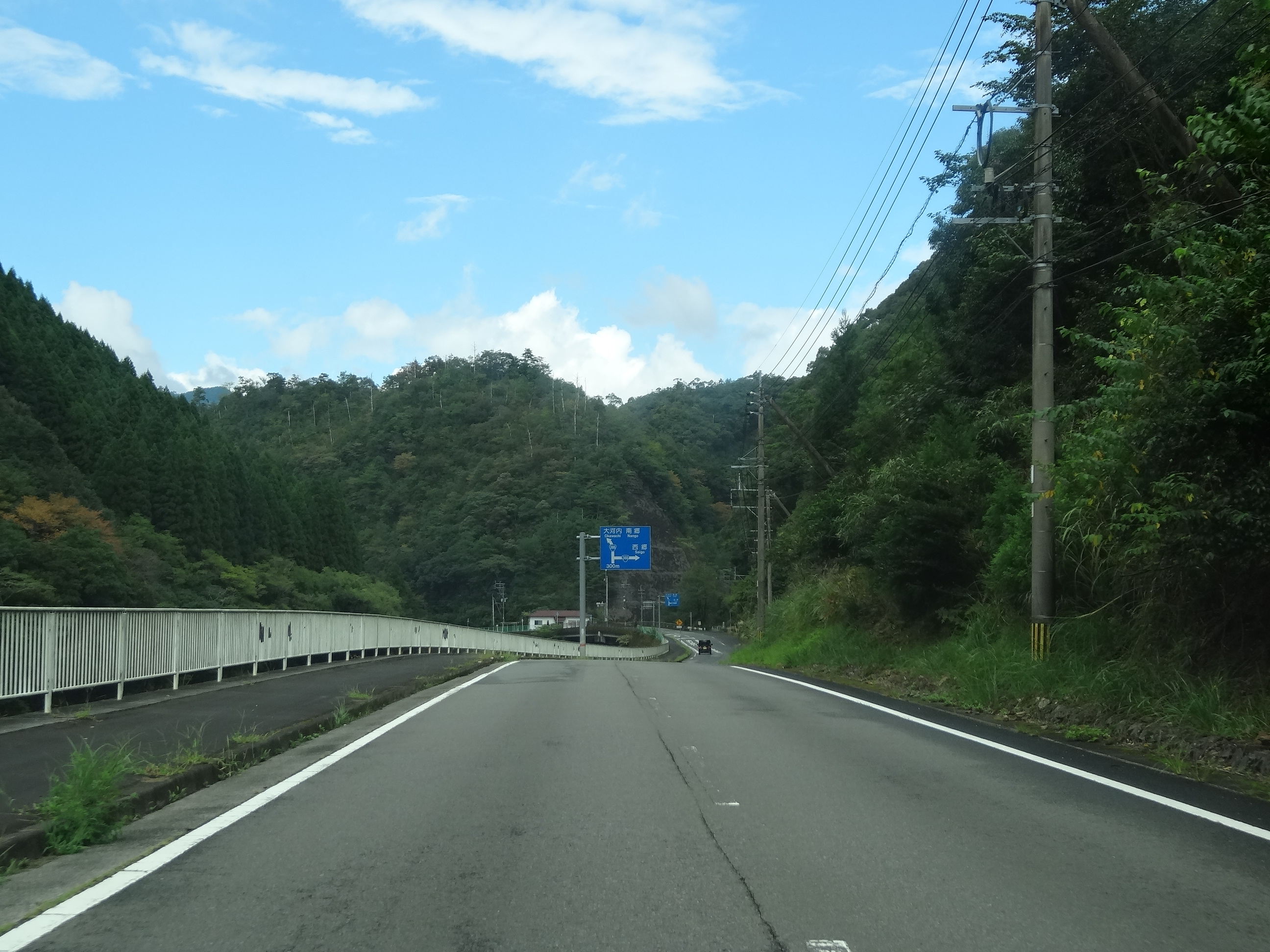

Route information
- Length: 103.3 km (64.2 mi)

Location
- Country: Japan

Highway system
- National highways of Japan; Expressways of Japan
| ← National Route 445 | → National Route 447 |

National Route 446 is a national highway of Japan connecting Hyuga, Miyazaki and Yunomae, Kumamoto in Japan, with a total length of 103.3 km (64.2 mi).
