= Japan National Route 377 =

Road in Japan

National Route 377
- 国道377号
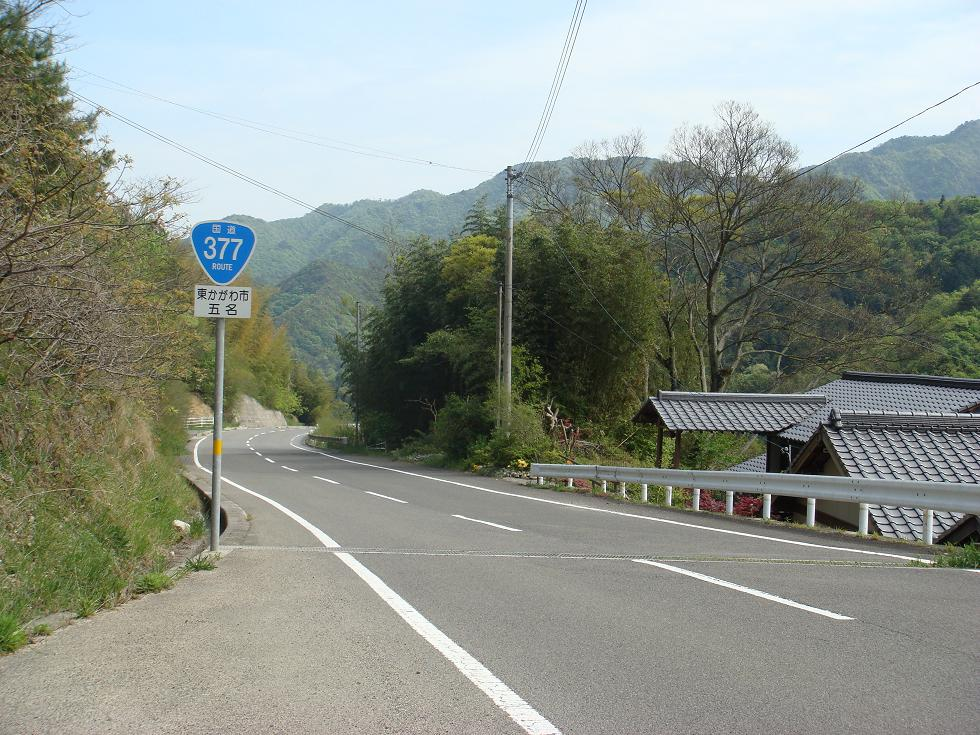

Route information
- Length: 129.9 km (80.7 mi)

Location
- Country: Japan

Highway system
- National highways of Japan; Expressways of Japan
← National Route 376	→ National Route 378

National Route 377 is a national highway of Japan connecting Naruto, Tokushima and Kan'onji, Kagawa in Japan, with a total length of 129.9 km (80.72 mi).
