= Japan National Route 440 =

Road in Japan

National Route 440
- 国道440号
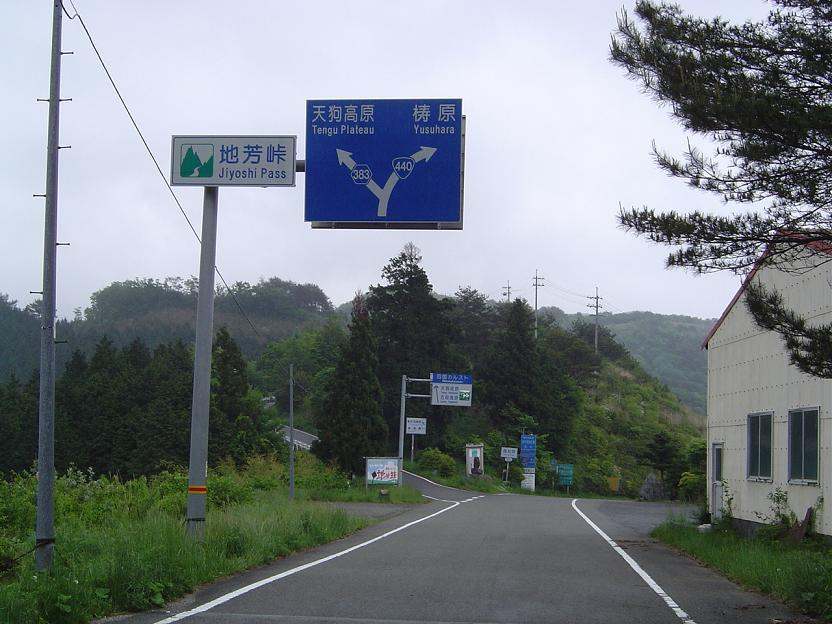

Route information
- Length: 96.2 km (59.8 mi)

Location
- Country: Japan

Highway system
- National highways of Japan; Expressways of Japan
← National Route 439	→ National Route 441

National Route 440 is a national highway of Japan connecting Matsuyama, Ehime and Yusuhara, Kōchi in Japan and has a total length of 96.2 km (59.78 mi).
