= Japan National Route 379 =

National highway in Japan

National Route 379
- 国道379号

Route information
- Length: 53.8 km (33.4 mi)

Location
- Country: Japan

Highway system
- National highways of Japan; Expressways of Japan
← National Route 378	→ National Route 380

National Route 379 is a national highway of Japan connecting Matsuyama, Ehime and Uchiko, Ehime in Japan, with a total length of 53.8 km (33.43 mi).
