= Japan National Route 378 =

Road in Ehime prefecture, Japan

National Route 378
- 国道378号
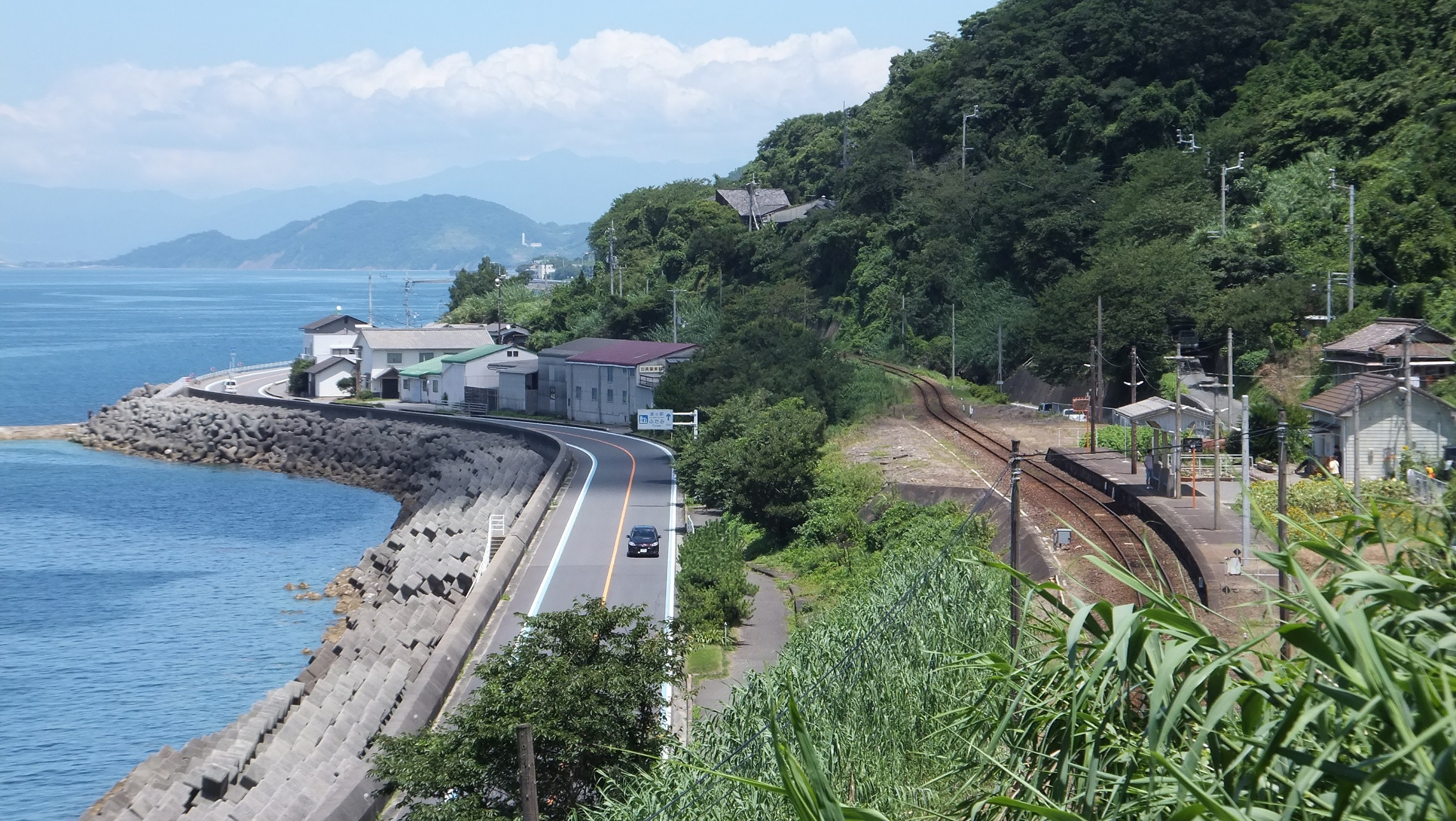

Route information
- Length: 124.1 km (77.1 mi)

Location
- Country: Japan

Highway system
- National highways of Japan; Expressways of Japan
← National Route 377	→ National Route 379

National Route 378 is a national highway of Japan connecting Iyo, Ehime and Uwajima, Ehime in Japan, with a total length of 124.1 km (77.11 mi).
