= Japan National Route 443 =

Road in Japan

National Route 443
- 国道443号
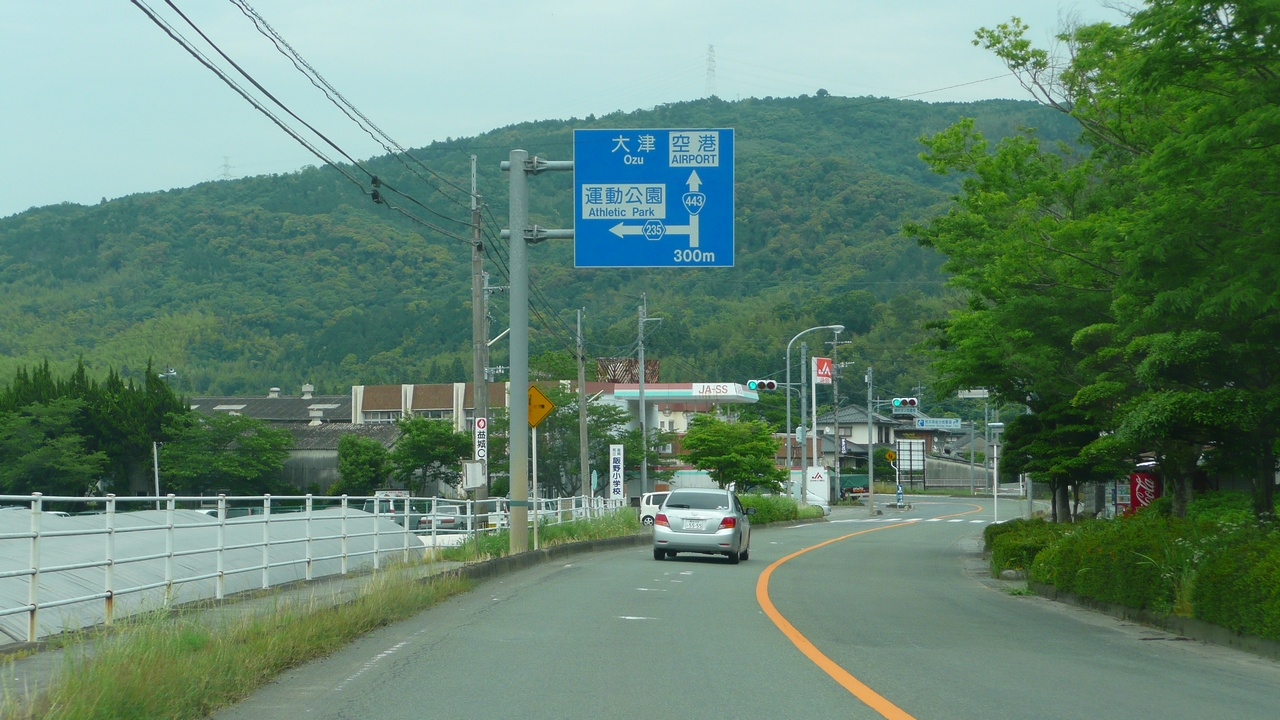

Route information
- Length: 124.9 km (77.6 mi)

Location
- Country: Japan

Highway system
- National highways of Japan; Expressways of Japan
← National Route 442	→ National Route 444

National Route 443 is a national highway of Japan connecting Ōkawa, Fukuoka and Hikawa, Kumamoto in Japan, with a total length of 124.9 km (77.61 mi).
