= Japan National Route 320 =

Road in Japan

National Route 320
- 国道320号
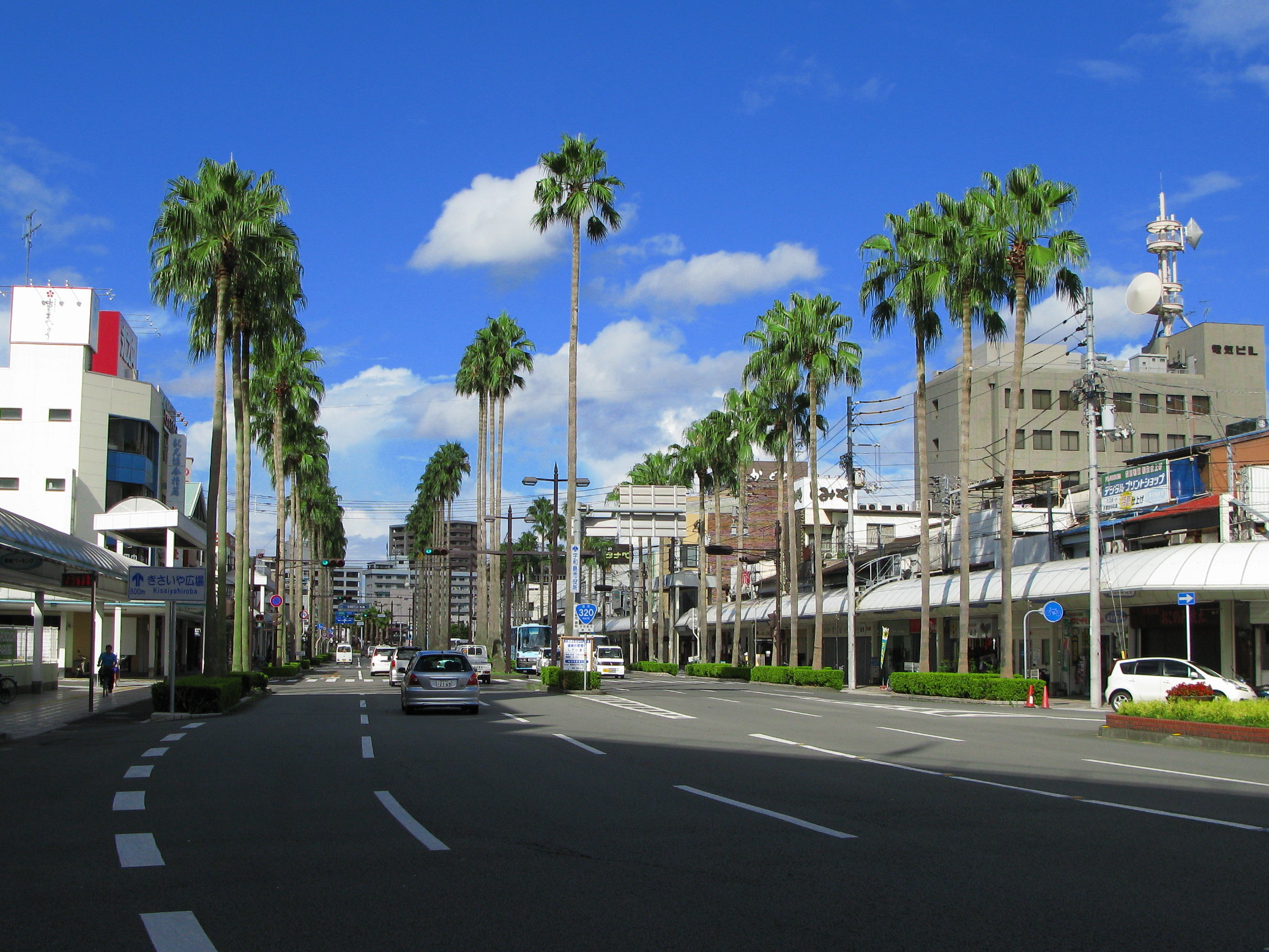

Route information
- Length: 98.3 km (61.1 mi)

Location
- Country: Japan

Highway system
- National highways of Japan; Expressways of Japan
← National Route 319	→ National Route 321

National Route 320 is a national highway of Japan connecting Sukumo, Kōchi and Kihoku, Ehime in Japan, with a total length of 98.3 km (61.08 mi).
