= Japan National Route 444 =

National highway in Japan

National Route 444
- 国道444号

Route information
- Length: 73.5 km (45.7 mi)

Location
- Country: Japan

Highway system
- National highways of Japan; Expressways of Japan
← National Route 443	→ National Route 445

National Route 444 (国道444号, Kokudō Yonhyaku Yonjū Yongō) is a national highway of Japan on the island of Kyushu. The 73.5-kilometer (45.7 mi) highway begins in the city of Ōmura in Nagasaki Prefecture and ends in the city of Saga in Saga Prefecture.
