= Japan National Route 437 =

Road in Japan

National Route 437
- 国道437号

Route information
- Length: 61.7 km (38.3 mi)

Location
- Country: Japan

Highway system
- National highways of Japan; Expressways of Japan
← National Route 436	→ National Route 438

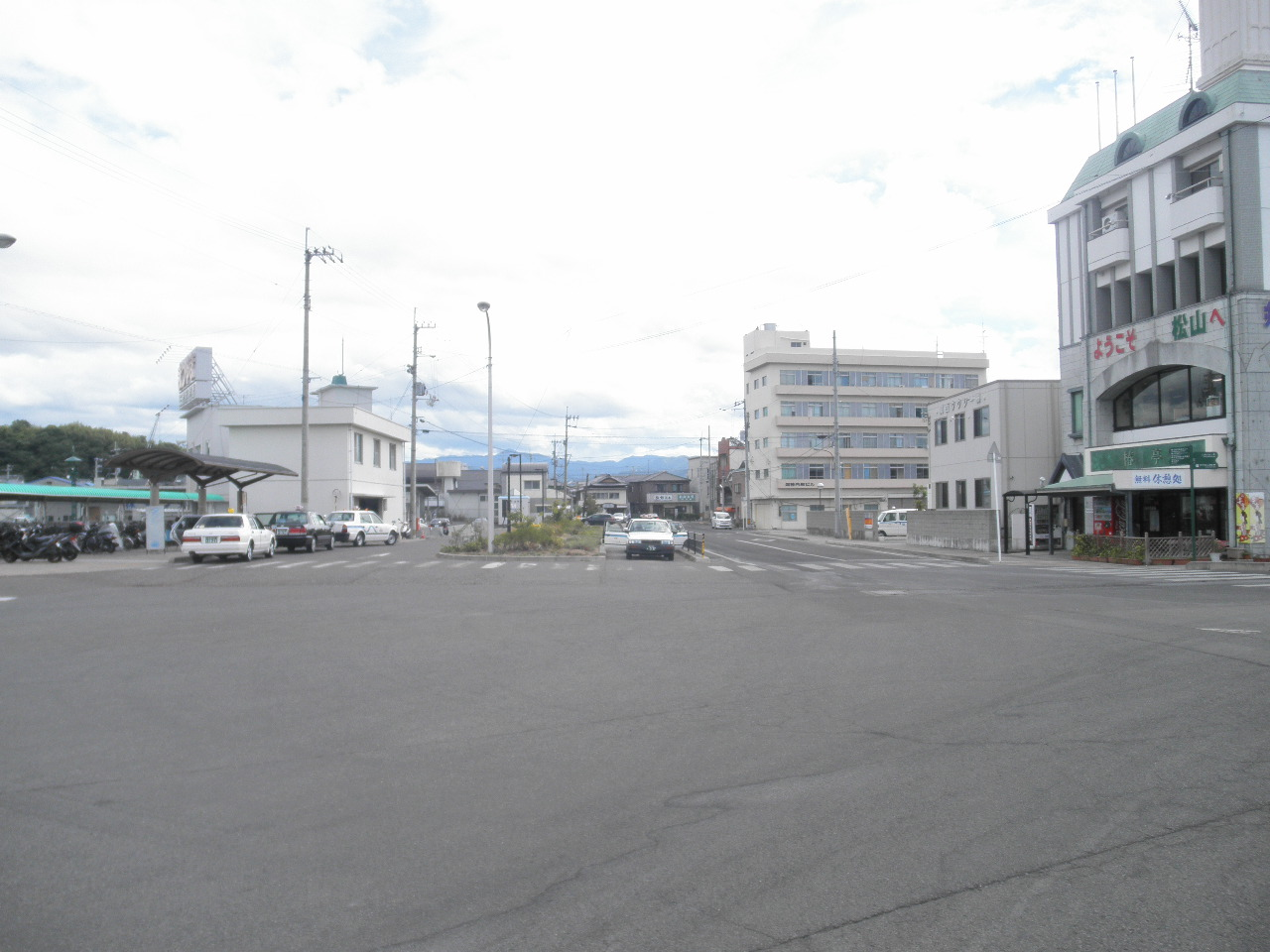

National Route 437 is a national highway of Japan connecting Matsuyama, Ehime and Iwakuni, Yamaguchi in Japan, with a total length of 61.7 km (38.34 mi).
