= Japan National Route 375 =

Road in Japan

National Route 375
- 国道375号
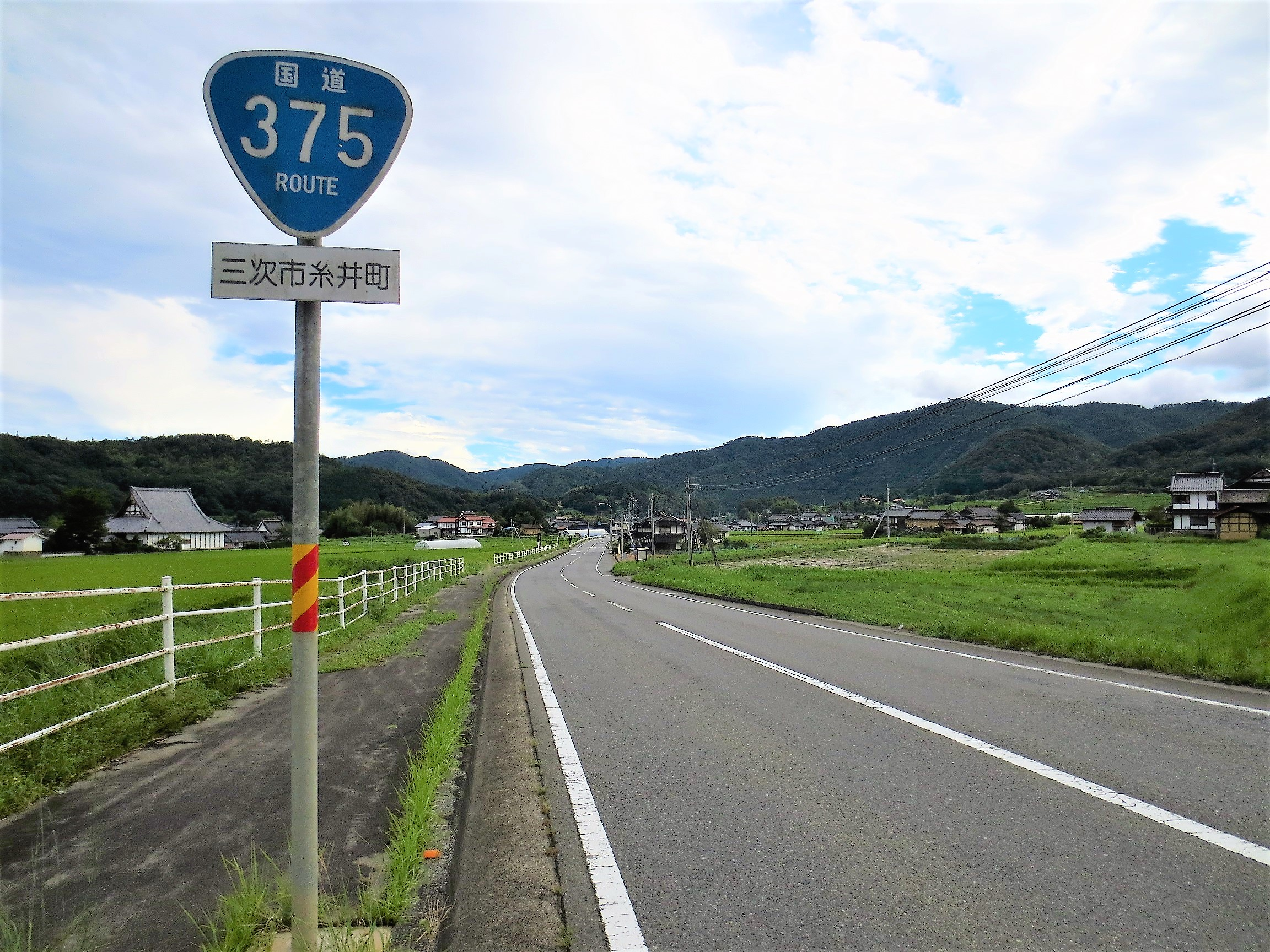

Route information
- Length: 163.4 km (101.5 mi)

Location
- Country: Japan

Highway system
- National highways of Japan; Expressways of Japan
← National Route 374	→ National Route 376

National Route 375 is a national highway of Japan connecting Kure, Hiroshima and Ōda, Shimane in Japan, with a total length of 163.4 km (101.53 mi).
