= Japan National Route 445 =

Highway in Japan

National Route 445
- 国道445号
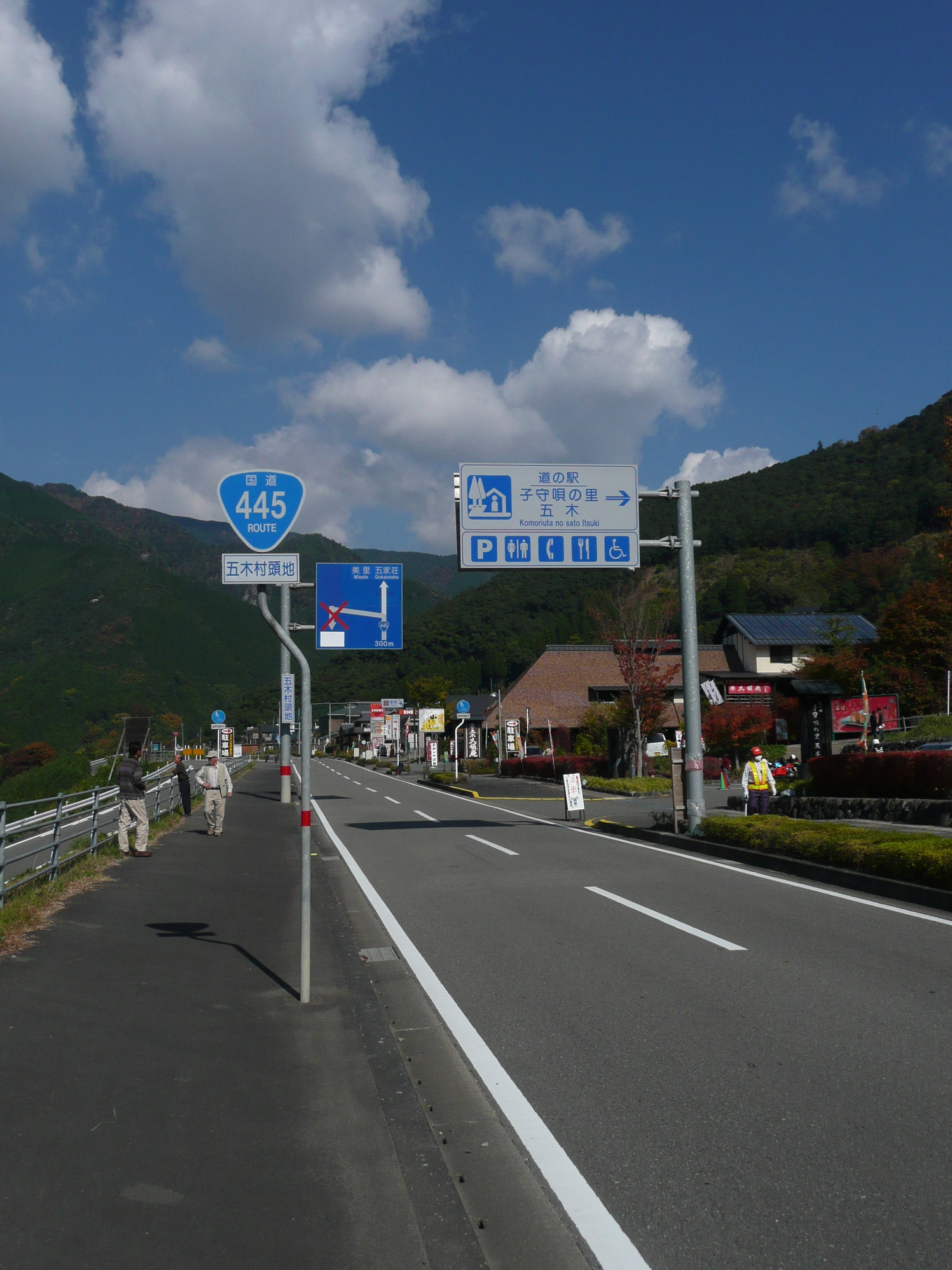

Route information
- Length: 136.1 km (84.6 mi)

Location
- Country: Japan

Highway system
- National highways of Japan; Expressways of Japan
← National Route 444	→ National Route 446

National Route 445 is a national highway of Japan connecting Chūō-ku, Kumamoto and Hitoyoshi, Kumamoto in Japan, with a total length of 136.1 km (84.6 mi).
