= Japan National Route 318 =

National highway in Japan

National Route 318
- 国道318号

Route information
- Length: 43.4 km (27.0 mi)

Location
- Country: Japan

Highway system
- National highways of Japan; Expressways of Japan
| ← National Route 317 | → National Route 319 |

National Route 318 is a national highway of Japan connecting Tokushima, Tokushima and Higashikagawa, Kagawa in Japan, with a total length of 43.4 km (26.97 mi).
