= Japan National Route 376 =

Road in Yamaguchi prefecture, Japan

National Route 376
- 国道376号

Route information
- Length: 68.1 km (42.3 mi)

Location
- Country: Japan

Highway system
- National highways of Japan; Expressways of Japan
← National Route 375	→ National Route 377

National Route 376 is a national highway of Japan connecting Yamaguchi, Yamaguchi and Iwakuni, Yamaguchi in Japan, with a total length of 68.1 km (42.32 mi).
