= Japan National Route 447 =

National highway of Japan

National Route 447
- 国道447号
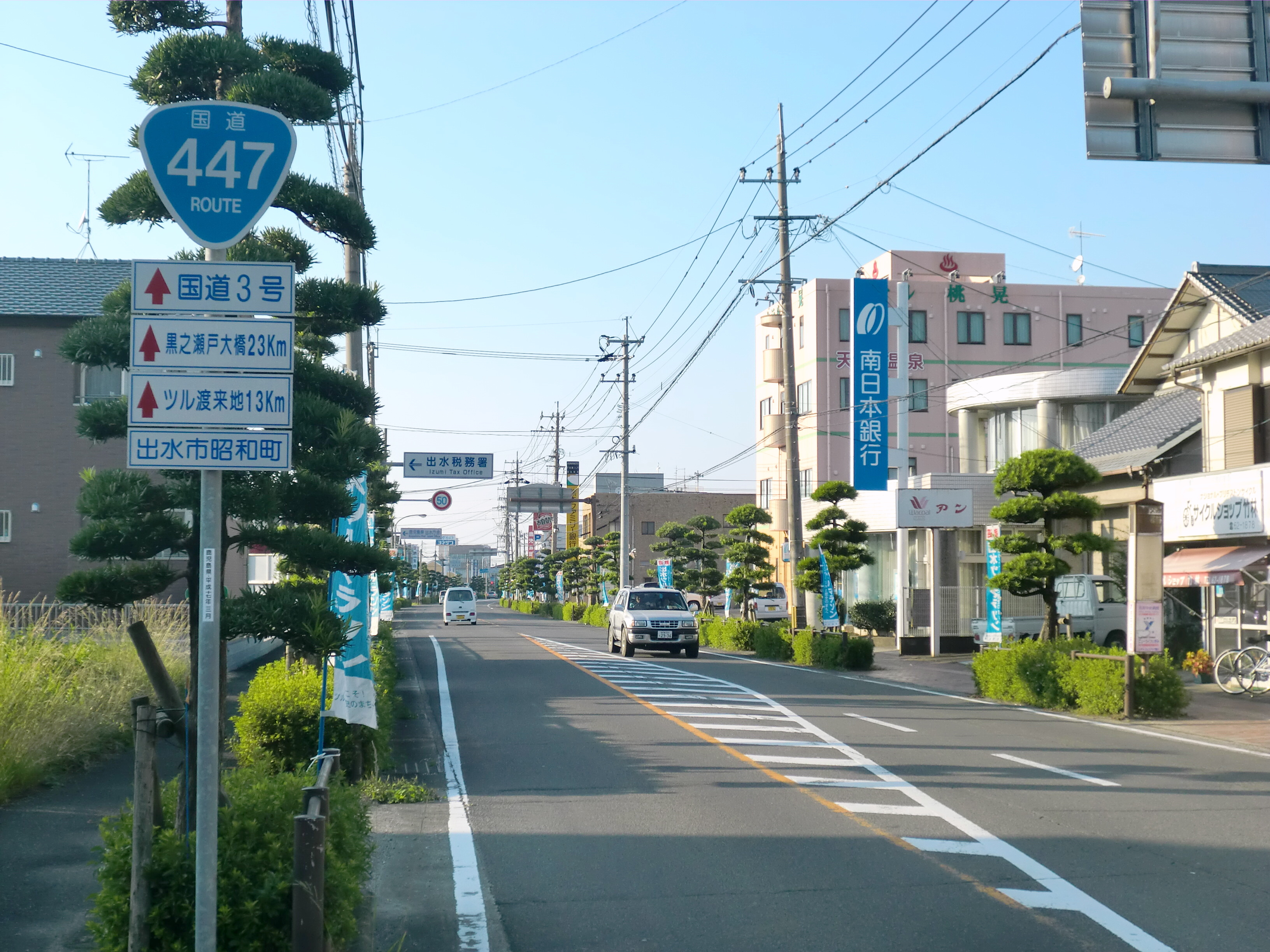

Route information
- Length: 60.4 km (37.5 mi)

Location
- Country: Japan

Highway system
- National highways of Japan; Expressways of Japan
← National Route 446	→ National Route 448

National Route 447 is a national highway of Japan connecting Ebino, Miyazaki and Izumi, Kagoshima in Japan, with a total length of 60.4 km (37.5 mi).
