= Japan National Route 439 =

Road in Japan

National Route 439
- 国道439号
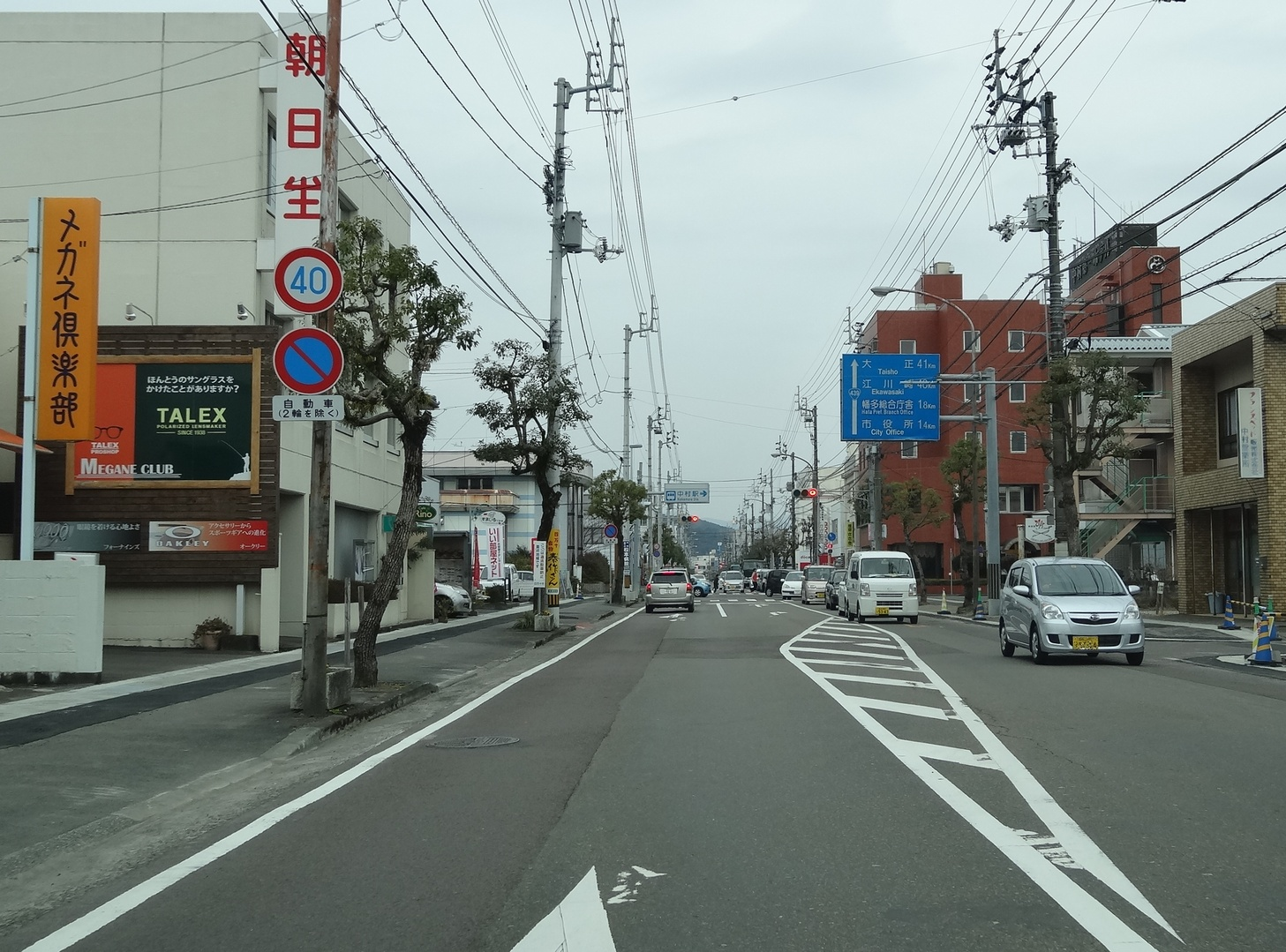

Route information
- Length: 341.2 km (212.0 mi)

Location
- Country: Japan

Highway system
- National highways of Japan; Expressways of Japan
← National Route 438	→ National Route 440

National Route 439 is a national highway of Japan connecting Tokushima, Tokushima and Shimanto, Kōchi in Japan, with a total length of 341.2 km (212.01 mi).
