= 442 =

442 may refer to:

- 442 (number)
- AD 442, a year in the 5th century of the Gregorian calendar
- 442 BC, a year in the pre-Julian Roman calendar
- Area code 442
- 4–4–2, a football formation
- 442 Eichsfeldia, a large asteroid

== Media ==
- FourFourTwo, a football magazine
- 4–4–2, a band formed to record the song "Come On England" for the England football team for the Euro 2004 championship
- 442oons, a football animation parody YouTube channel
- FourFourTwo (TV series), an Asian football TV series

== Military ==
- 442 Transport and Rescue Squadron, of the Royal Canadian Air Force
- 442d Bombardment Squadron, an inactive United States Air Force unit
- 442d Operations Group, an active United States Air Force Reserve unit
- 442d Tactical Fighter Training Squadron, an inactive United States Air Force unit
- 442nd Fighter Wing, an Air Reserve Component of the United States Air Force
- 442nd Infantry Regiment (United States) of the United States Army, also known as the 442nd Regimental Combat Team
- 442nd Missile Brigade, of the Soviet Army

== Transportation ==
- Oldsmobile 442, a muscle car produced by Oldsmobile
- List of highways numbered 442
- 4-4-2 (locomotive), a steam locomotive configuration in Whyte notation
- British Rail Class 442, a British EMU train
- New South Wales 442 class locomotive, a class of diesel locomotives
