= 443 (disambiguation) =

The number 443 may refer to:

- 443 AD
- 443 BC
- 400 (number) § 443
- Area code 443, in the state of Maryland
- MP-443 Grach, a Russian pistol
- TCP port 443, the default port for HTTPS network traffic

== See also ==
- List of highways numbered 443
