= Sandalfoot Cove, Florida =

Community in Florida, United States

- unincorporated place
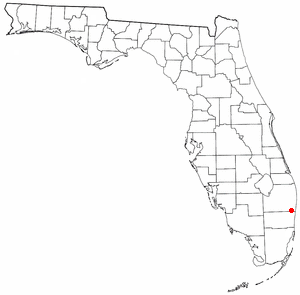
- The location of Sandalfoot Cove, Florida.
- Coordinates: 26°20′20″N 80°11′7″W
- Country: United States
- State: Florida
- County: Palm Beach

Area
  - Total: 3.0 sq mi (7.7 km^{2})
  - Land: 3.0 sq mi (7.7 km^{2})
  - Water: 0 sq mi (0.0 km^{2})
- Elevation: 13 ft (4 m)

Population (2000)
  - Total: 16,582
  - Density: 5,587/sq mi (2,157.1/km^{2})
- Time zone: UTC-5 (Eastern (EST))
  - Summer (DST): UTC-4 (EDT)
- Area codes: 561, 728
- FIPS code: 12-63450
- GNIS feature ID: 1867199

Sandalfoot Cove was a former census-designated place (CDP) and current unincorporated place near Boca Raton in Palm Beach County, Florida, United States. The population was 16,582 at the 2000 census. While it is not officially in the City of Boca Raton, the community is frequently classified under its umbrella term.

== Geography ==
Sandalfoot Cove is located at 26°20′20″N 80°11′07″W, or about five miles southwest of Boca Raton.

According to the United States Census Bureau, the CDP has a total area of 7.7 km^{2} (3.0 sq mi), all land.

Although the defined western border stops at U.S. Route 441, the area directly west is also generally referred to by residents as Sandalfoot as well. Sandalfoot Boulevard continues west of 441. This area includes the Watergate Estates mobile homes, Boca Trails, Palmetto Pines, Boca Springs, and Tudor Woods.

== Demographics ==
As of the 2000 census, there were 16,582 people, 6,895 households, and 4,592 families residing in the CDP. The population density was 2,155.7 people/km^{2} (5,583 people/mi^{2}). There were 7,743 housing units at an average density of 1,006.6 units/km^{2} (2,607 units/mi^{2}). The racial makeup of the CDP was 87.21% White (76.4% were Non-Hispanic White), 3.96% African American, 0.15% Native American, 2.97% Asian, 0.05% Pacific Islander, 3.29% from other races, and 2.37% from two or more races. Hispanic or Latino of any race were 14.46% of the population.

In 2000, there were 6,895 households, out of which 30.1% had children under the age of 18 living with them, 51.8% were married couples living together, 11.4% had a female householder with no husband present, and 33.4% were non-families. 25.8% of all households were made up of individuals, and 12.2% had someone living alone who was 65 years of age or older. The average household size was 2.40 and the average family size was 2.91.

In 2000, in the former CDP, the population was spread out, with 22.3% under the age of 18, 6.3% from 18 to 24, 30.9% from 25 to 44, 21.1% from 45 to 64, and 19.4% who were 65 years of age or older. The median age was 39 years. For every 100 females, there were 90.6 males. For every 100 females age 18 and over, there were 85.8 males.

In 2000, the median income for a household in the CDP was $44,243, and the median income for a family was $49,871. Males had a median income of $39,774 versus $29,920 for females. The per capita income for the CDP was $23,232. About 3.3% of families and 5.0% of the population were below the poverty line, including 5.4% of those under age 18 and 3.3% of those age 65 or over.

As of 2000, English was the first language for 76.91% of all residents, while Spanish accounted for 14.88%, Portuguese consisted of 3.18%, Italian made up 1.72%, Yiddish was totaled at 0.66%, Vietnamese totaled 0.56%, both French and German were at 0.46%, French Creole was at 0.43%, Arabic at 0.39%, and Hebrew was the mother tongue for 0.29% of the population.

As of 2000, the former CDP is home to a sizable and growing number of immigrants, most notably Brazilian and Colombian; as well as Haitian. This can be seen in the shopping centers south of Judge Winikoff Road, along 441, where there are a number of Brazilian and Colombian restaurants and markets within the area.

== Crime ==
Sandalfoot Cove, has a reputation as being one of the parts of unincorporated Boca Raton with a high crime rate, although there's no data sustaining that claim. According to Crime Grades, Violent Crimes in Sandalfoot Cove are rare, receiving an A+ score for Violent, Property Crime, and Others. This Reputation is likely due to the adjacent area, east of the 441 Road, which is known for some crime activity, but it's not part of SandalFoot Cove. Although this area also had a decline in crime through the years, according to sources.
