= List of highways numbered 446 =

The following highways are numbered 446:

== Japan ==
- Japan National Route 446

== United States ==
- Indiana State Road 446
- Kentucky Route 446
- Maryland Route 446
- Nevada State Route 446
- New Jersey Route 446 (unsigned designation for the Atlantic City Expressway)
  - New Jersey Route 446X (unsigned designation for the Atlantic City–Brigantine Connector)
- New Mexico State Road 446
- New York State Route 446
- Ohio State Route 446
- Pennsylvania Route 446
- Puerto Rico Highway 446

Preceded by 445	Lists of highways 446	Succeeded by 447
