= List of highways numbered 449 =

The following highways are numbered 449:

== Canada ==
- Manitoba Provincial Road 449

== Japan ==
- Japan National Route 449

== United States ==
- Kentucky Route 449
- Louisiana Highway 449
- Maryland Route 449
- Montana Secondary Highway 449
- Pennsylvania Route 449
- Puerto Rico Highway 449
- Tennessee State Route 449
- Farm to Market Road 449

| Preceded by 448 | Lists of highways 449 | Succeeded by 450 |
