= List of highways numbered 448 =

The following highways are numbered 448:

== Canada ==
- Manitoba Provincial Road 448
- Highway 448 (Ontario) (unbuilt)

== Germany ==
- Bundesautobahn 448

== India ==
- National Highway 448 (India)

== Japan ==
- Japan National Route 448

== United States ==
- Louisiana Highway 448
- Maryland Route 448 (former)
- New Mexico State Road 448
- New York State Route 448
- Puerto Rico Highway 448
- Tennessee State Route 448

Preceded by 447	Lists of highways 448	Succeeded by 449
