= List of highways numbered 450 =

The following highways are numbered 450:

== Canada ==
- Manitoba Provincial Road 450
- New Brunswick Route 450
- Newfoundland and Labrador Route 450

== Japan ==
- Route 450 (Japan)

== United States ==
- U.S. Route 450 (former)
- Florida State Road 450
- Indiana State Road 450
- Iowa Highway 450
- Maryland Route 450
- Mississippi Highway 450
- New Mexico State Road 450
- Ohio State Route 450
- Puerto Rico Highway 450
- Wyoming Highway 450

Preceded by 449	Lists of highways 450	Succeeded by 451
