= List of highways numbered 444 =

The following highways are numbered 444:

== Australia ==
- Wilsons Promontory Road

== Canada ==
- Manitoba Provincial Road 444

== Israel ==
- Route 444

== Japan ==
- Japan National Route 444

== United States ==
- Interstate 444 (unsigned)
- Louisiana Highway 444
- Maryland Route 444
- Montana Secondary Highway 444
- Nevada State Route 444
- New Jersey Route 444 (unsigned designation for the Garden State Parkway)
  - New Jersey Route 444R
  - New Jersey Route 444S
- New York State Route 444
- Ohio State Route 444
  - Ohio State Route 444A (former)
- Puerto Rico Highway 444
- Tennessee State Route 444

Preceded by 443	Lists of highways 444	Succeeded by 445
