= List of highways numbered 447 =

The following highways are numbered 447:

== Japan ==
- Japan National Route 447

== United States ==
- Kentucky Route 447
- Louisiana Highway 447
- Maryland Route 447 (former)
- Montana Secondary Highway 447
- Nevada State Route 447
- Pennsylvania Route 447
- Puerto Rico Highway 447
- Texas State Highway Spur 447

| Preceded by 446 | Lists of highways 447 | Succeeded by 448 |
