= List of highways numbered 445 =

The following highways are numbered 445:

== Canada ==
- Manitoba Provincial Road 445
- New Brunswick Route 445

== Cuba ==
- Nuevitas–Camagüey Road (5–445)

== Japan ==
- Japan National Route 445

== United States ==
- Florida State Road 445
- County Road 445 (Hernando County, Florida)
- Indiana State Road 445
- Louisiana Highway 445
- Maryland Route 445
- Nevada State Route 445
- New Jersey Route 445 (unsigned designation for the Palisades Interstate Parkway)
  - New Jersey Route 445S
- New Mexico State Road 445
- North Carolina Highway 445
- Pennsylvania Route 445
- Puerto Rico Highway 445
- South Carolina Highway 445 (former)
- Tennessee State Route 445
- Texas
  - Texas State Highway Loop 445
  - Farm to Market Road 445

Preceded by 444	Lists of highways 445	Succeeded by 446
