= List of highways numbered 441 =

The following highways are numbered 441:

== Japan ==
- Japan National Route 441

== United States ==
- U.S. Route 441
- Florida State Road 441
- Indiana State Road 441
- Louisiana Highway 441
- Maryland Route 441
- New York State Route 441
- Pennsylvania Route 441
- Puerto Rico Highway 441
- Tennessee State Route 441
- Wisconsin Highway 441

Preceded by 440	Lists of highways 441	Succeeded by 442
