= Oldsmobile 442 =

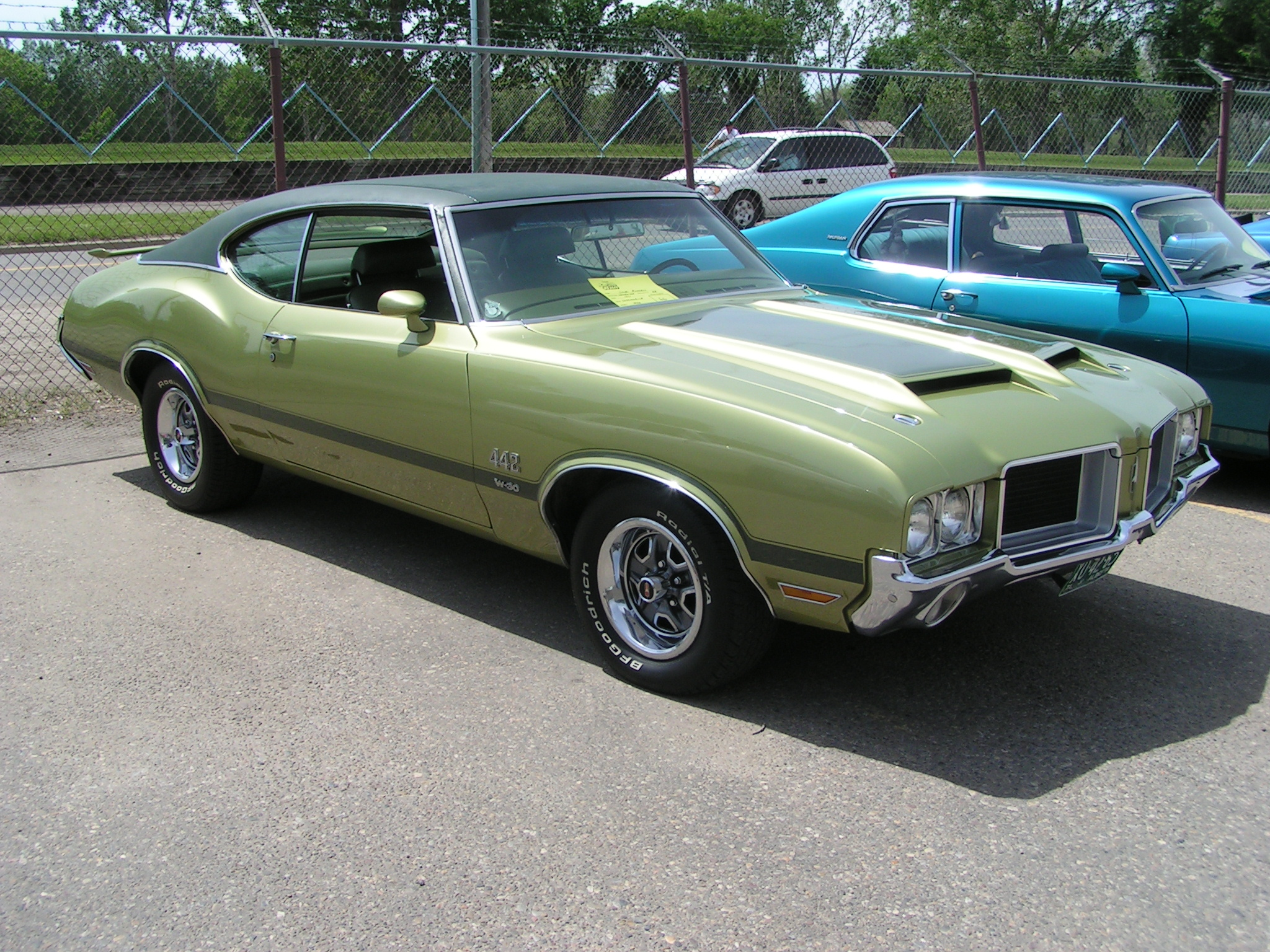
- 1971 Oldsmobile 442

Overview
- Manufacturer: Oldsmobile (General Motors)
- Model years: 1964–1980; 1985–1987; 1990–1991

Body and chassis
- Class: Muscle car
- Layout: FR layout

The Oldsmobile 4-4-2 is a muscle car produced by Oldsmobile between the 1964 and 1987 model years. Introduced as an option package for US-sold F-85 and Cutlass models, it became a model in its own right from 1968 to 1971, spawned the Hurst/Olds in 1968, then reverted to an option through the mid-1970s. The name returned in the 1980s on the rear-wheel drive Cutlass Supreme and in the early 1990s as an option package for the new front-wheel drive Cutlass Calais.

The "4-4-2" name (pronounced "Four-four-two") derives from the original car's four-barrel carburetor, four-speed manual transmission, and dual exhausts. It was originally written "4-4-2" (with badging showing hyphens between the numerals), and remained hyphenated throughout Oldsmobile's use of the designation. Beginning in 1965, the 4-4-2's standard transmission was a three-speed manual, along with an optional two-speed automatic and four-speed manual, but were still badged as "4-4-2"s. Because of this change, from 1965 on, Oldsmobile brochures and advertisements defined the 4-4-2 designation as the 400 cubic inch engine, four-barrel carburetor, and dual exhausts. By 1968, badging was shortened to simply "442", but Oldsmobile brochures and internal documents continued to use the "4-4-2" model designation.

== First generation ==
First generation
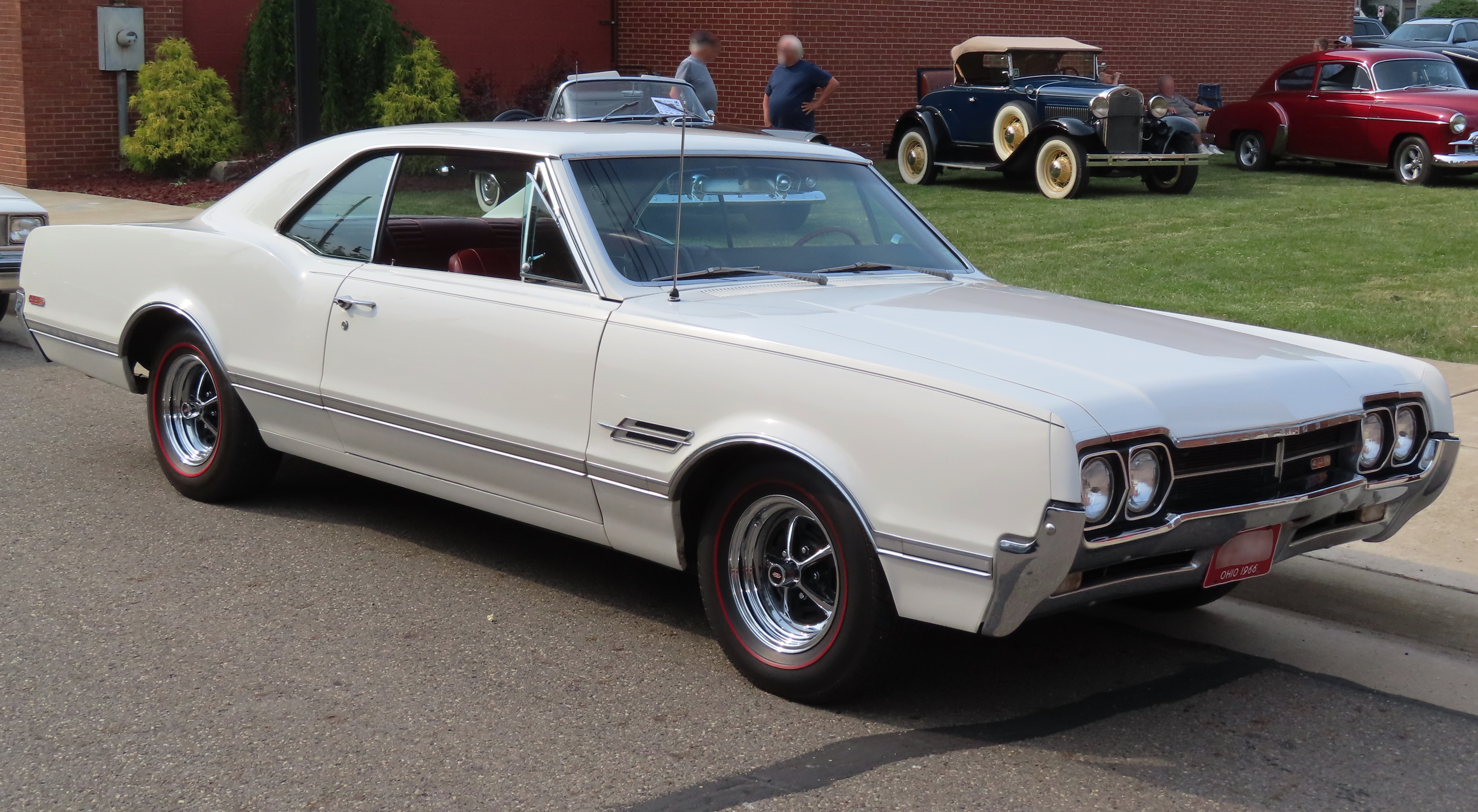
- 1966 Oldsmobile 442 2-door hardtop

Overview
- Production: 1964–1967
- Assembly: Lansing, Michigan (Lansing Car Assembly); Framingham, Massachusetts (Framingham Assembly); Fremont, California (Fremont Assembly)

Body and chassis
- Body style: 2-door coupe 2-door convertible 2-door sedan 4-door sedan
- Platform: A-body
- Related: Chevrolet Malibu; Pontiac GTO; Buick Gran Sport

Powertrain
- Engine: 5.4 L Oldsmobile 330 V8; 6.5 L Oldsmobile 400 V8
- Transmission: 4-speed manual 3-speed manual 2-speed Jet-Away automatic 3-speed Turbo Hydramatic automatic

=== 1964 ===
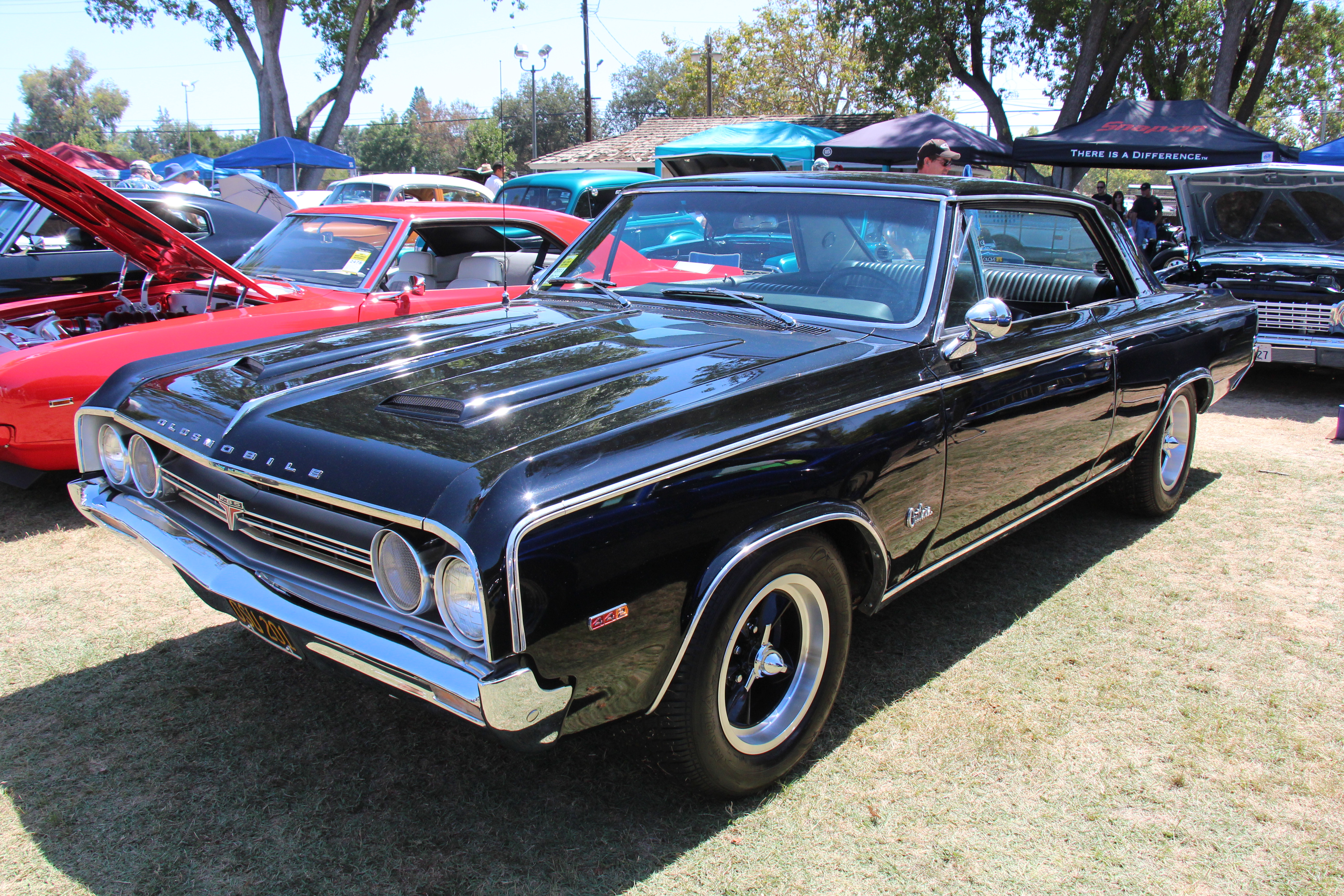
1964 Oldsmobile 442 2-door hardtop

The 4-4-2 emerged from competition between the Pontiac and Oldsmobile divisions of GM. The high-performance GTO version of the Pontiac LeMans intermediate had proved an unexpected success midway through the 1964 model year. Oldsmobile's hasty response was to beef up their own popular Cutlass, a task given to a team led by performance enthusiast and Olds engineer John Beltz (later responsible for the distinctive and powerful Toronado), aided by Dale Smith and division chief engineer Bob Dorshimer.

Contrasted with the 1964 Tempest LeMans GTO with its 389 cubic inch V-8 (introduced in September 1963 as an option package), the Oldsmobile offering was a conservative package. Technically the "B09 Police Apprehender Pursuit" option, the 442 used the four-barrel carbureted 330 CID (5.4 L) V8, known as L79, but with shorter valve spring retainers, longer pushrods, M400 rod and main bearings, and high lift camshaft, raising rated (SAE gross) output to 310 hp (231.3 kW) at 5,200 rpm. Torque remained 355 lb⋅ft (481 N⋅m), although the torque peak rose from 2800 rpm to 3600 rpm. Enhanced handling was credited to the heavy-duty (HD) suspension package that included HD springs (30% higher rating), HD shocks (valving with 50% more restriction), a 15/16 diameter front and 7/8 diameter rear sway bar, and boxed lower rear control arms with denser bushings. Other standard 442 equipment included Muncie M20, heavy-duty clutch with higher-rate springs in the pressure plate assembly, HD manual steering ratio 20:1 versus the standard ratio 24:1, performance rear axle ratio 3.36:1, dual exhaust, 14x6 HD wheels sporting 7.5 x14 US Royal 80XP Black with red stripe tire, front fender and rear decklid 442 medallions, and a dual snorkel air cleaner. The 442 was not equipped with power brakes or steering unless added as an option. The frame, part number 3837595, was not unique or modified for the 442 option, and could be found under F85s equipped with a manual transmission. There was an HD frame option in 1964, part number 9773002; which was boxed, but it was not standard equipment for the 442. Unlike the 1965 442 model built in Lansing, the 1964 442 does not have an option code on the data plate. Documentation shows that the 1964 442 was built in both Lansing and Fremont.

The package was dubbed 4-4-2 based on its combination of a four-barrel carburetor, a four-speed manual transmission, and dual exhausts. It was available on any F-85 or Cutlass model except the station wagon, although most were Cutlass hardtop coupés (Oldsmobile archives indicate that approximately 10 four-door sedans were built with the B09 option) with an optional list price of $136 ($1,412 in 2025 dollars), added to the MSRP of $2,663 ($27,644 in 2025 dollars) for the coupe and $2,773 ($28,786 in 2025 dollars) for the hardtop, along with additional optional equipment. A total of 2,999 were sold.

Motor Trend tested an early 1964 4-4-2 with a 3:55 rear axle (standard ratio was 3.36:1) and found that the 3,440 lb (1,560 kg) car ran 0–60 mph (0–97 km/h) in 7.5 seconds, the standing quarter mile in 15.5 seconds at 90 mph (145 km/h), and reached a top speed of 116 mph (187 km/h).

=== 1965 ===
With the GTO receiving GM corporate sanction to receive its full-sized car's 389 V-8, Oldsmobile followed suit and replaced the 4-4-2's standard 330 CID with the new 400 CID (6.5 L). The definition of "4-4-2" was then restated as referring to 400 cubic inches, a four-barrel carburetor (a 515 cfm Rochester four-jet), and two exhausts. Output for the big engine rose to 345 hp (257 kW) and 440 lb⋅ft (597 N⋅m). The standard transmission became a three-speed manual with a column shifter, with a floor-shifter four-speed and Oldsmobile's two-speed Jetaway automatic transmission as optional. A heavy-duty three-speed with Hurst floor shifter was introduced as a mid-year option.

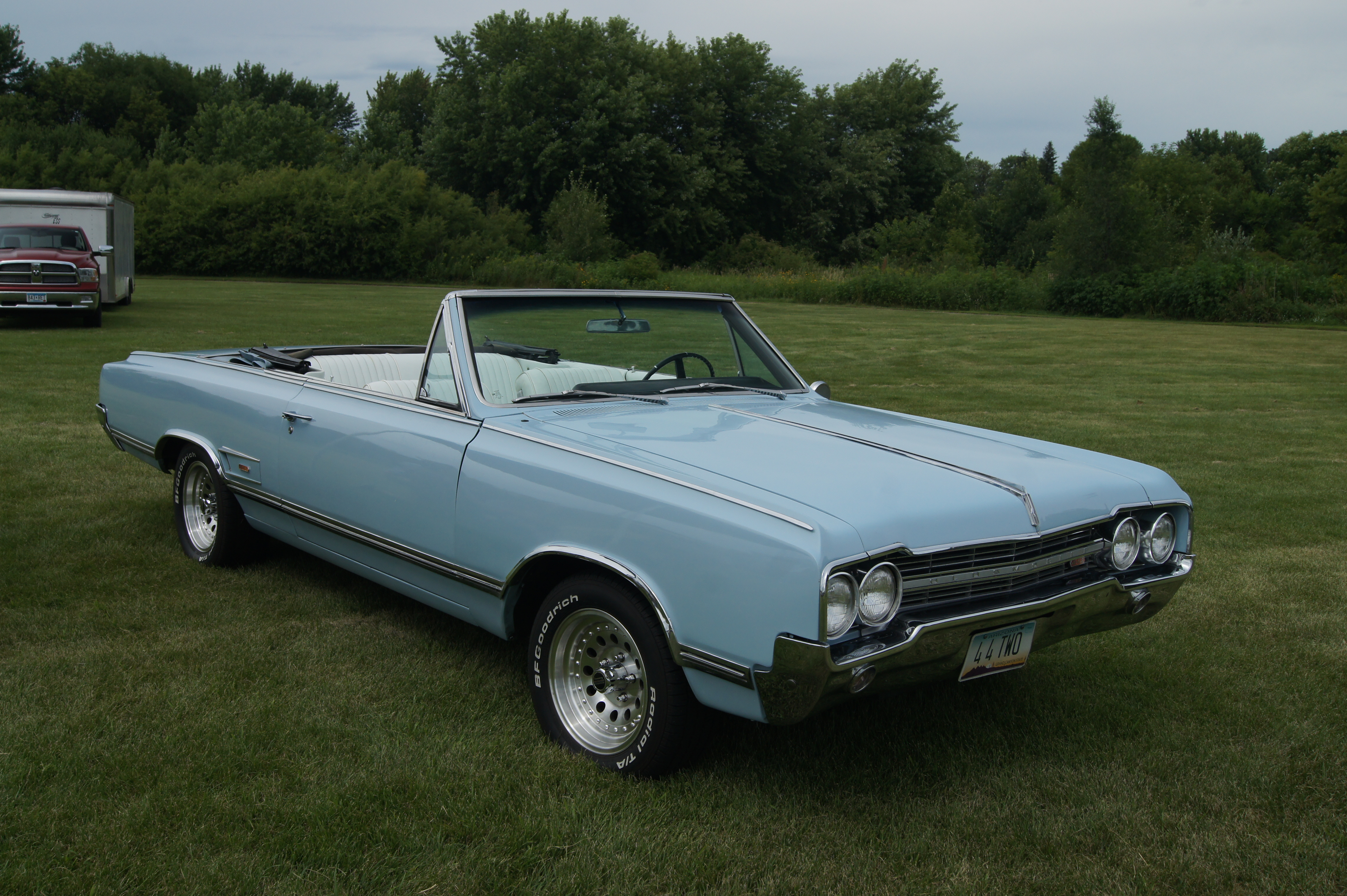
1965 Oldsmobile 442 convertible

Other additions to the 1965 included chrome body side scoops with 4-4-2 badging, chambered dual exhaust pipes, a chrome single-snout air cleaner, and 4-4-2 badging on the dash. Late in the year option N98 was added, which were chrome 14 in × 6 in (356 mm × 152 mm) wheels. It also offered standard bucket seats when optioned on the Cutlass and a 6,000 rpm tachometer mounted in the optional console, more for decoration than usefulness. Retractable front seat belts were optional. The turning diameter was 41 feet.

Modern Rod tested a 1965 F85 4-4-2 with the four-speed manual, slicks, and headers and obtained a quarter mile acceleration of 13.78 seconds at 102.73 mph (165 km/h); Car Life's automatic 1965 ran the quarter mile in 15.5 seconds at 89 mph (143 km/h), with a 0 to 60 mph time of 7.8 seconds. Car and Driver tested a 1965 4-4-2 and did 0–60 mph in 5.5 seconds.

Offered in four body styles, 4-4-2 sales rose to 25,003, including 3,468 convertibles.

=== 1966 ===
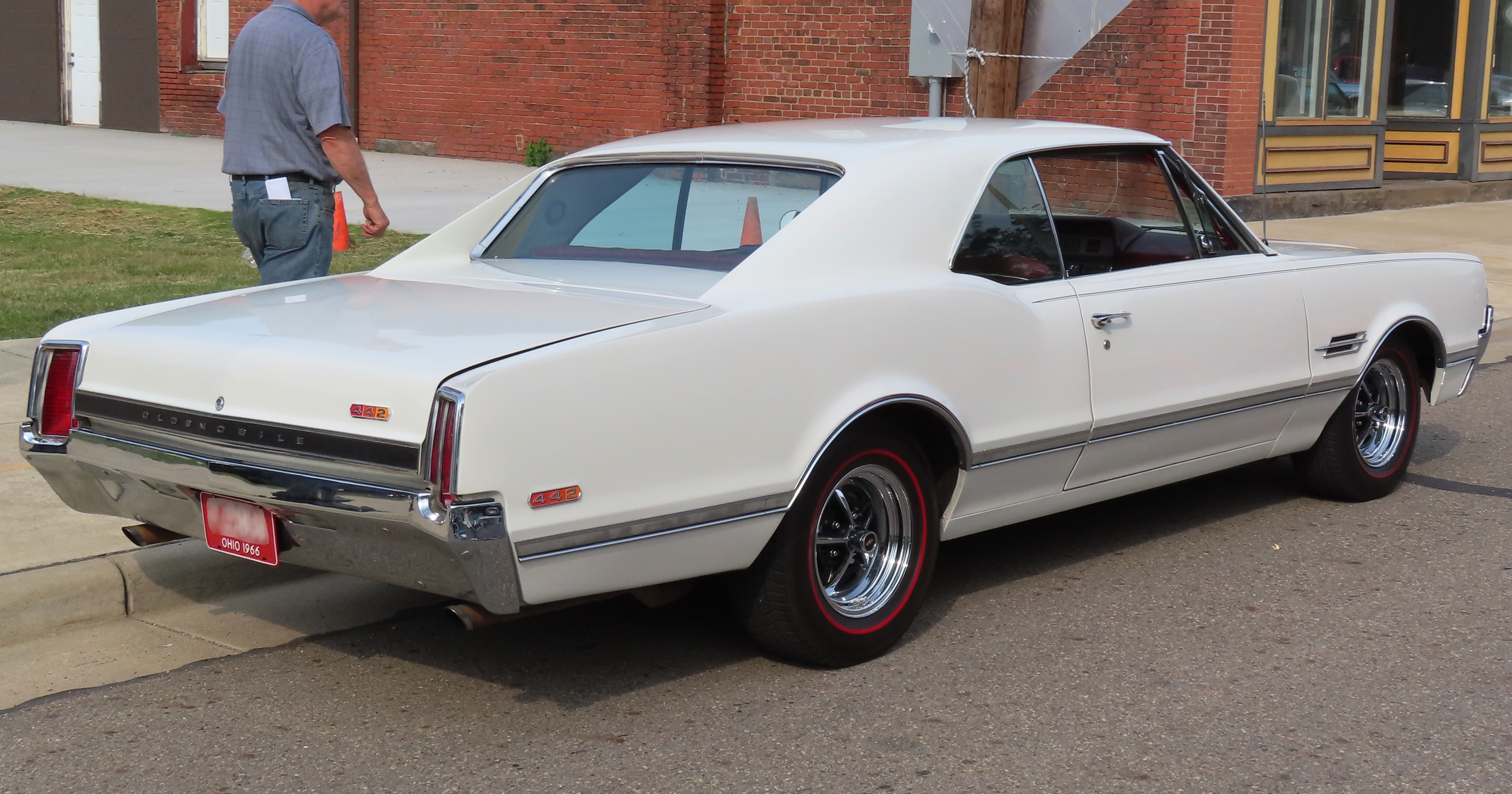
1966 4-4-2 2-door hardtop rear

The 1966 4-4-2 shared a modest facelift with other Cutlasses. It came with a 400 ci L78 V8 rated at 350 hp (261 kW) and 440 lb⋅ft (597 N⋅m) with a single four-barrel carburetor. Two new optional 400 ci engines offered even higher performance: the 360 hp (268 kW) L69, with three two-barrel Rochester 2GC carburetors on a progressive linkage and 440 lb⋅ft (597 N⋅m) of torque, which was priced at US$264.54, and the rare W30. Besides the convertible, the 4-4-2 option was available on both hardtop and pillared coupes, which shared the same roofline. Besides the new sweeping C pillar on coupes, which featured a "flying buttress" recessed rear window, the new body had high, round rear fenders giving the car a more muscular appearance.

The W30 engine added an outside-air induction system (sending cool air to the carburetors via tubing from the front grille) and a hotter cam, under-rated as producing the same 360 hp (268 kW) as the L69. The battery was relocated to the trunk to make room for the air hoses, which prevented the package from being ordered on convertible models. Only 54 W30s were built by the factory, although an additional 97 were produced for dealer installation.

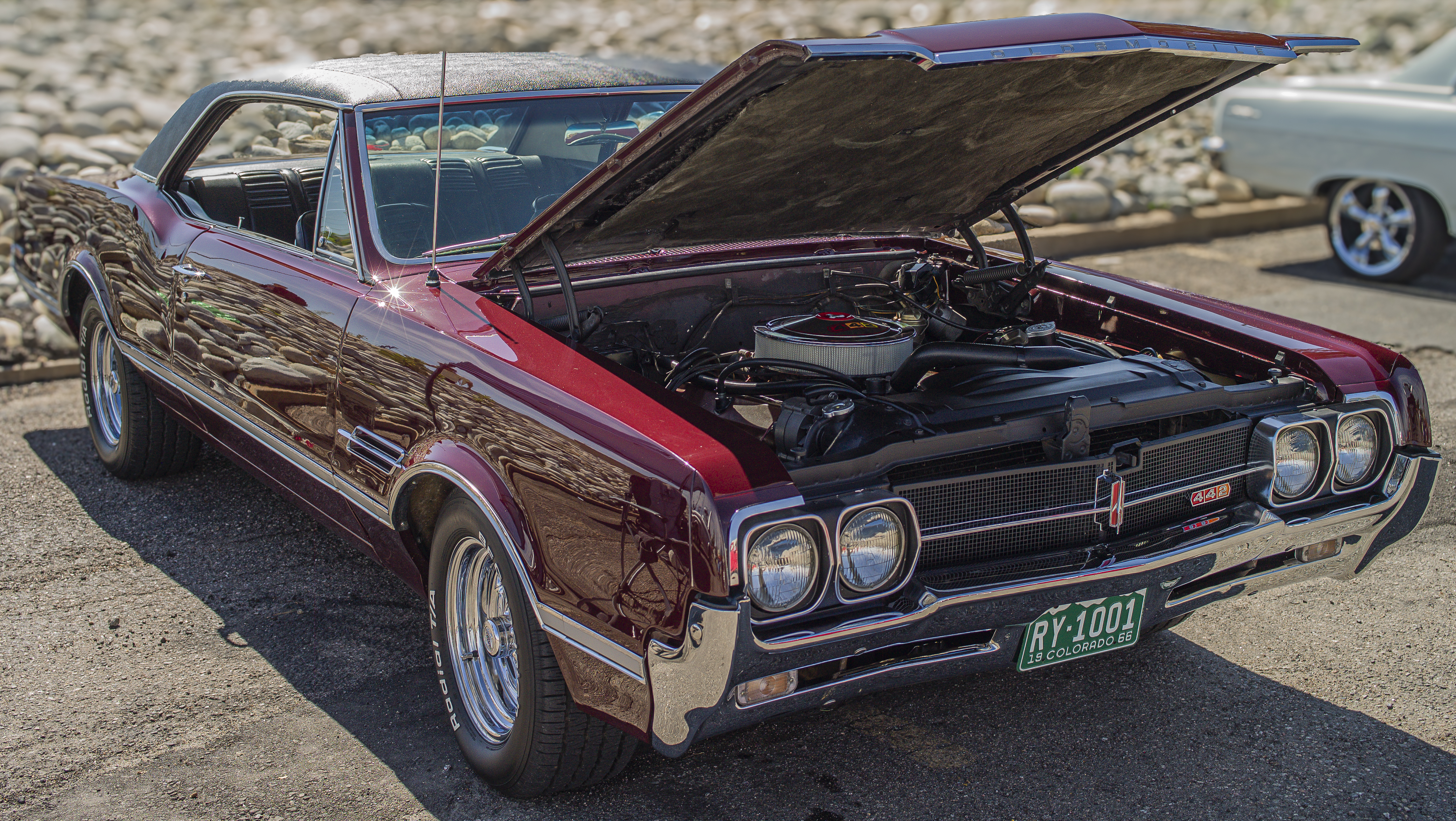
1966 442 In Autumn Bronze. 400 Cubic inch with a 4 Barrel Carburetor if visible.

The standard transmission was a three-speed manual with column shift, and the two-speed Jetaway automatic with switch-pitch torque converter was optional. Hurst shifters became standard equipment with floor-mounted manual transmissions, including the optional heavy-duty three-speed, M-20 wide-ratio four-speed, or M-21 close-ratio four-speed. The standard 350-hp 400 engine could be ordered with any of the four transmissions, while only manual transmissions could be ordered with the L69 three two-barrel option.

Inside, a revised instrument panel featured two round pods for the speedometer and other instruments, replacing the horizontal sweep speedometer of 1964–65 models, but the rest of the basic dashboard design was unchanged. F-85 models had base interiors with bench seats and rubber floor mats, while the more lavish Cutlass versions came with full carpeting and featured Strato bucket seats with a new design, higher and thinner seat backs, or a no-cost bench seat option. Headrests were an option.

Car Life tested an L69 4-4-2 with a four-speed transmission and obtained a 0–60 mph time of 6.3 seconds and a quarter mile of 14.8 seconds at 97 mph (156 km/h). Motor Trend's similar test car ran 0–60 mph in 7.2 seconds, with a quarter mile time of 15.2 seconds at 96.6 mph (155.5 km/h).

Production slumped to 21,997. The 4-4-2 still constituted only about 10 percent of Cutlass sales.

=== 1967 ===
For 1967, the 4-4-2's styling and base engine remained the same, save for minor trim changes, a louvered hood, and an increase in intake valve size to 2.067 from 1.99. The three-speed Turbo Hydra-Matic automatic transmission with Switch Pitch became available, replacing the two-speed Switch Pitch Jetaway, as in mid-sized muscle cars from other GM divisions (Pontiac GTO, Chevrolet Chevelle SS396, and Buick GS400). The heavy-duty floor-mounted three-speed manual transmission was now standard, with the Muncie M-20 and M-21 four-speeds optional, all with Hurst shifters. Front disc brakes were a new option.

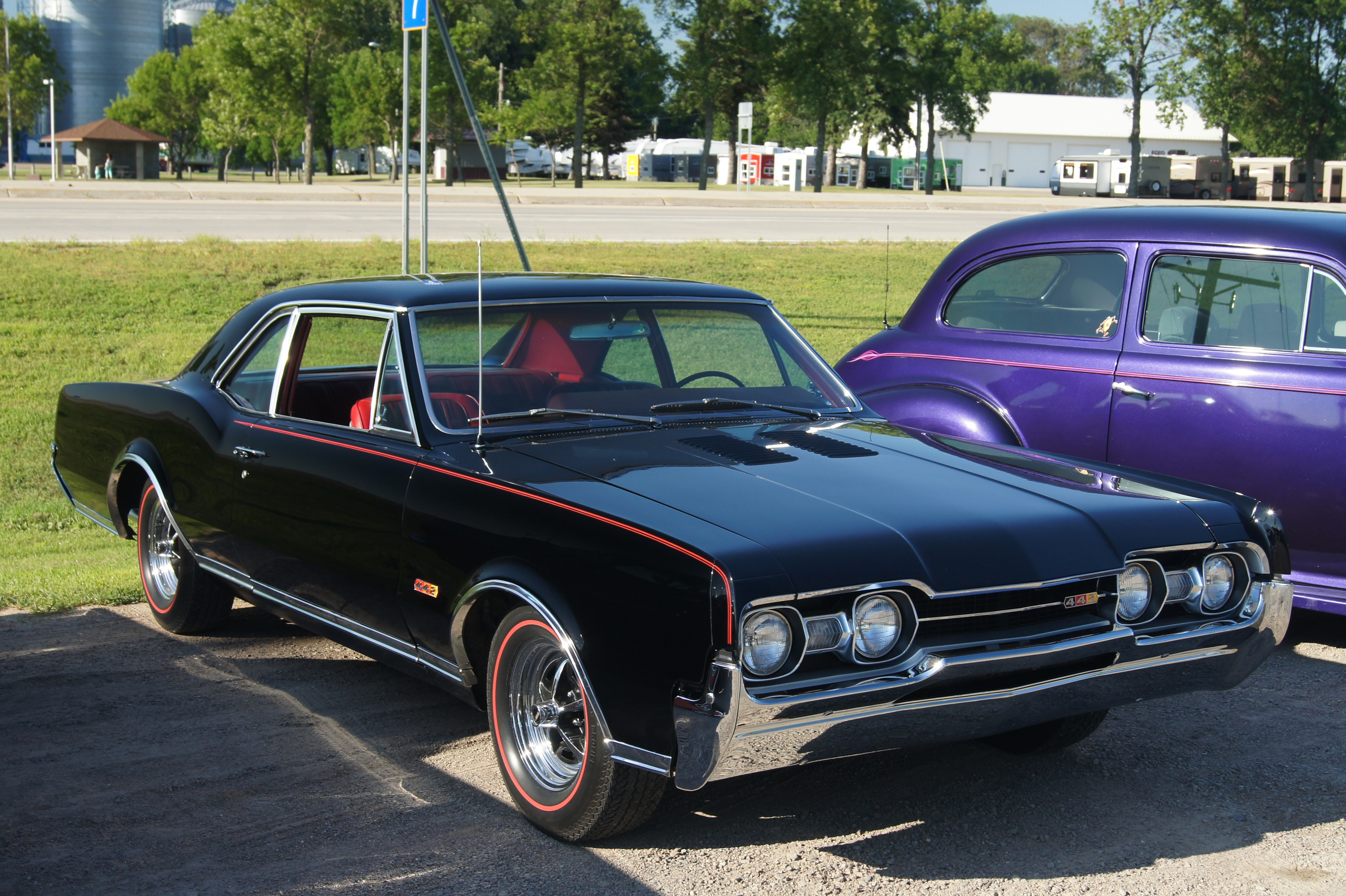
1967 Oldsmobile 442 2-door coupe

A GM policy decision banning multiple carburetors for all vehicles except Ed Cole's beloved Corvette and the Corvair ended the L69 with its triple carburetors, a rare option for Olds and an icon for Pontiacs since 1957. The W30 remained available, although the four-barrel Quadrajet carburetor replaced the tri-carb setup. New red plastic inner fender liners became part of the W30 package. 502 factory W30 engines were built to meet NHRA homologation rules, along with an unknown number of dealer-installed packages.

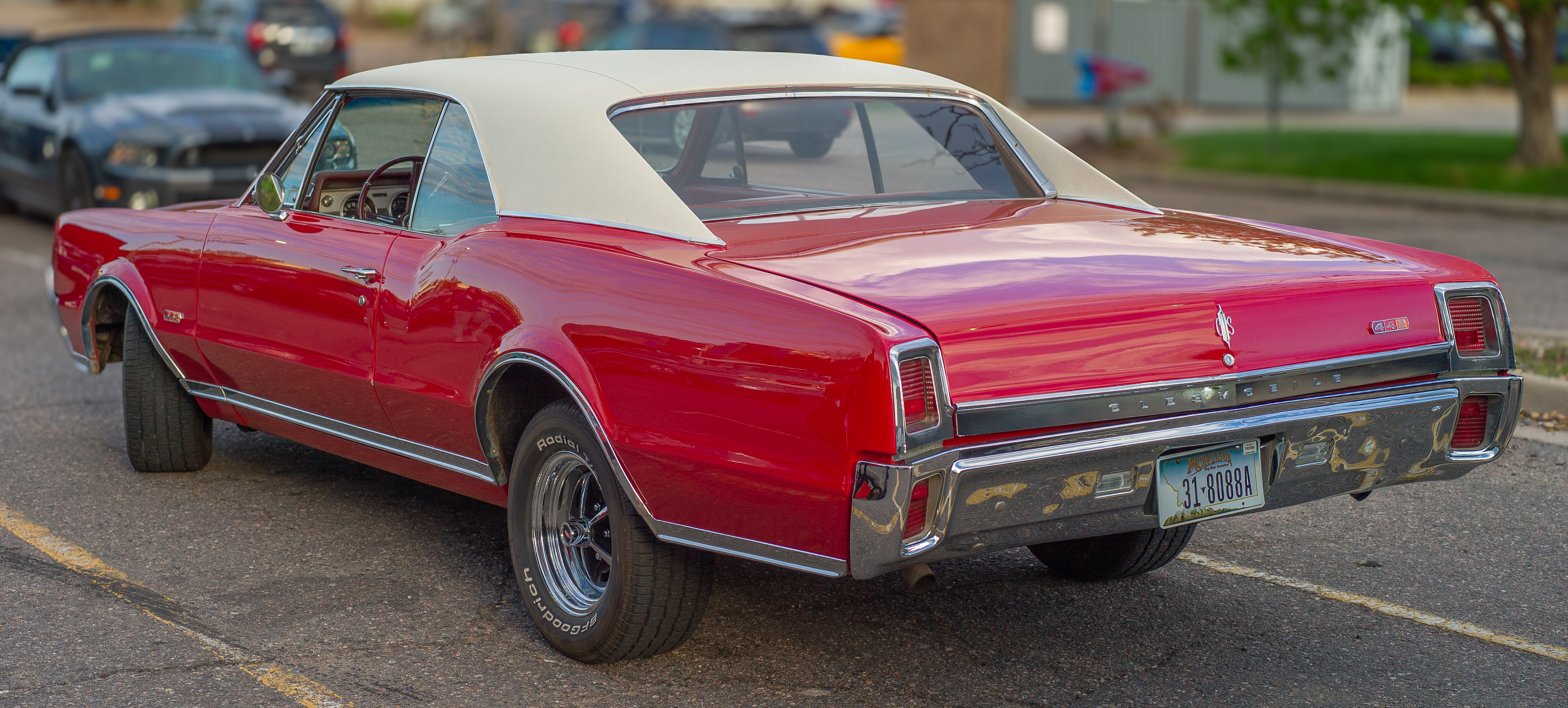
1967 Oldsmobile 442 Holiday Coupe

Cars tested a W30 4-4-2 with a close-ratio four-speed and a 4.33 rear axle (a dealer-installed-only option), obtaining a quarter-mile time of 14.1 seconds at 103 mph (166 km/h) in completely stock form. 0–60 mph times were between 6.5 and 6.7 seconds.

Unlike in previous years, when the 4-4-2 option could be ordered on either baseline F-85 or upscale Cutlass models, the 1967 4-4-2 package was based on the top-line Cutlass Supreme series, including the sport coupe (with center post), Holiday hardtop coupe and convertible. Standard equipment on all models included Strato bucket seats or no-cost notchback bench seat, full carpeting, expanded Morocceen vinyl upholstery, heavy-duty suspension with rear sway bar, and wide-oval tires.

Like all cars sold in the U.S. in 1967, the 4-4-2 came standard with a group of occupant protection and accident-avoidance features mandated by Federal law. This package included an energy-absorbing steering column and safety steering wheel, padded dash, recessed controls, four-way hazard flashers, and a dual-circuit brake hydraulic master cylinder.

Production rose somewhat from the previous year, rising to 24,833.

== Second generation ==
=== 1968 ===
Second generation
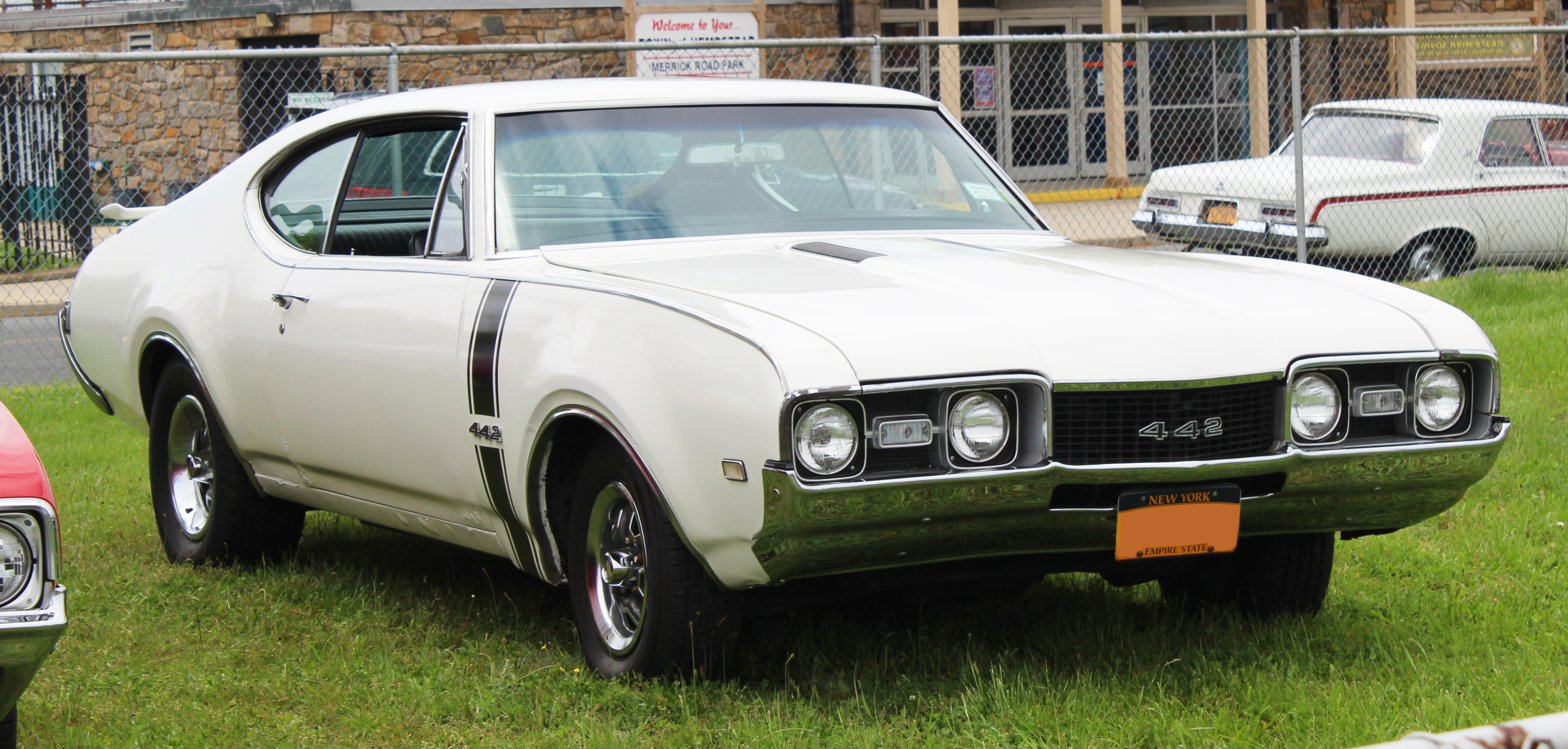
- 1968 Oldsmobile 442

Overview
- Production: 1968–1972
- Assembly: Lansing, Michigan (Lansing Car Assembly); Arlington, Texas (Arlington Assembly); Framingham, Massachusetts (Framingham Assembly); Fremont, California (Fremont Assembly); Linden, New Jersey (Linden Assembly); Oshawa, Ontario, Canada (Oshawa Car Assembly)

Body and chassis
- Body style: 2-door Sport coupe (pillars); 2-door Holiday coupe (hardtop); 2-door convertible Vista Cruiser station wagon (1970)
- Platform: A-body
- Related: Acadian Beaumont; Chevrolet Chevelle; Chevrolet Monte Carlo; Chevrolet Malibu; Chevrolet El Camino; GMC Sprint; Pontiac Tempest; Pontiac LeMans; Pontiac Grand Prix; Pontiac GTO; Oldsmobile F-85; Oldsmobile Cutlass; Oldsmobile Hurst/Olds; Buick Special; Buick Skylark; Buick GSX

Powertrain
- Engine: 455 cu in (7.5 L) V8; 400 cu in (6.6 L) 290hp V8
- Transmission: 4-speed manual 3-speed manual 3-speed automatic

Dimensions
- Wheelbase: 112.0 in (2,845 mm)
- Length: 203.2 in (5,161 mm)
- Width: 76.2 in (1,935 mm)
- Height: 52.8 in (1,341 mm)
- Curb weight: 3,713 pounds (1,684 kg)

The 4-4-2 became a separate model from 1968 through 1971. The wheelbase was 112 in (2,845 mm), and over 33,000 were sold for 1968. Despite the engine displacement staying at 400 CID, it used the new 455 V8's 4.25-inch stroke, with the bore decreased (to 3.87). Torque came at 3000–3200 rpm as opposed to the early 400s 3600 rpm peak, mostly due to a milder base cam grind. Car Life tested a 1968 4-4-2 with a 3.42:1 rear axle ratio and Hydramatic and attained 0–60 times of 7.0 seconds, and a quarter-mile time of 15.13 seconds at 92 mph (148 km/h). Top speed was reported as 115 mph (185 km/h). The base engine was still rated at 350 hp (261 kW), but only with the standard three-speed and optional four-speed; automatics were rated at 325 hp (242 kW). W-30s were rated again at 360 hp (268 kW). Car Life also tested a four-speed W-30 with a 4.33 rear end and recorded a 13.3 at 103.30 mph (166.2 km/h).

All standard 1968 4-4-2 engines are painted bronze–copper, as with the 1967s, and topped with a fire-red air cleaner. W-30 option cars featured ram-air intake hoses running from chrome-topped, dual-snorkel black air cleaners to special under-bumper air scoops, set off by bright red plastic fender wells. In addition, a Turnpike Cruiser option was available with a two-barrel carburetor; this was previously available on the 1967 Cutlass Supreme. 1968 was the first year for side marker lights and front outboard shoulder belts, and the last year for vent windows on hardtops and convertibles. The 1968 4-4-2 had unique rear bumpers with exhaust cutouts and special exhaust tips.

==== Hurst/Olds ====
In 1968, Oldsmobile partnered with Hurst Performance Research Corporation to create the Hurst/Olds rather than just adding Hurst shifters as with earlier models. The limited regular production run of 515 Hurst/Olds (459 Holiday Coupes/56 Sport Coupes) started as regular 4-4-2s but received numerous distinct cosmetic and mechanical enhancements. All cars were painted Peruvian silver (a Toronado color) with liberal black striping and white pinstripes, exterior and interior H/O badging (unique to 1968), and a real walnut wood dash insert. Mechanically, the cars left the factory with two drivetrain combinations. Red 455 CID engines were paired with modified W-30 Turbo 400 automatic transmissions. A/C cars got W-46 engines with 3.08:1 rears while non-A/C cars got W-45 engines with 3.91:1 rears. While both engines were rated at 390 hp (291 kW), the W-45 engine got the cylinder heads from the W-30 and the camshaft from the W-31, making it better suited to higher RPMs. All cars came with bucket seats and a Hurst dual-gate shifter in a mini-console. Also standard were numerous regular 4-4-2 options such as disc brakes, heavy-duty cooling, and FE2 suspension. They shared the red fender wells and ram air setup with the W-30. Popular, but not standard, additional options included the tick-tock-tach and wood-grained steering wheel. Power front disc brakes were optional.

The 1968 Hurst/Olds posted a 0–60 mph time of 5.4 seconds, and ran the 1/4 mile in 13.9 seconds at 103 mph (166 km/h).

=== 1969 ===
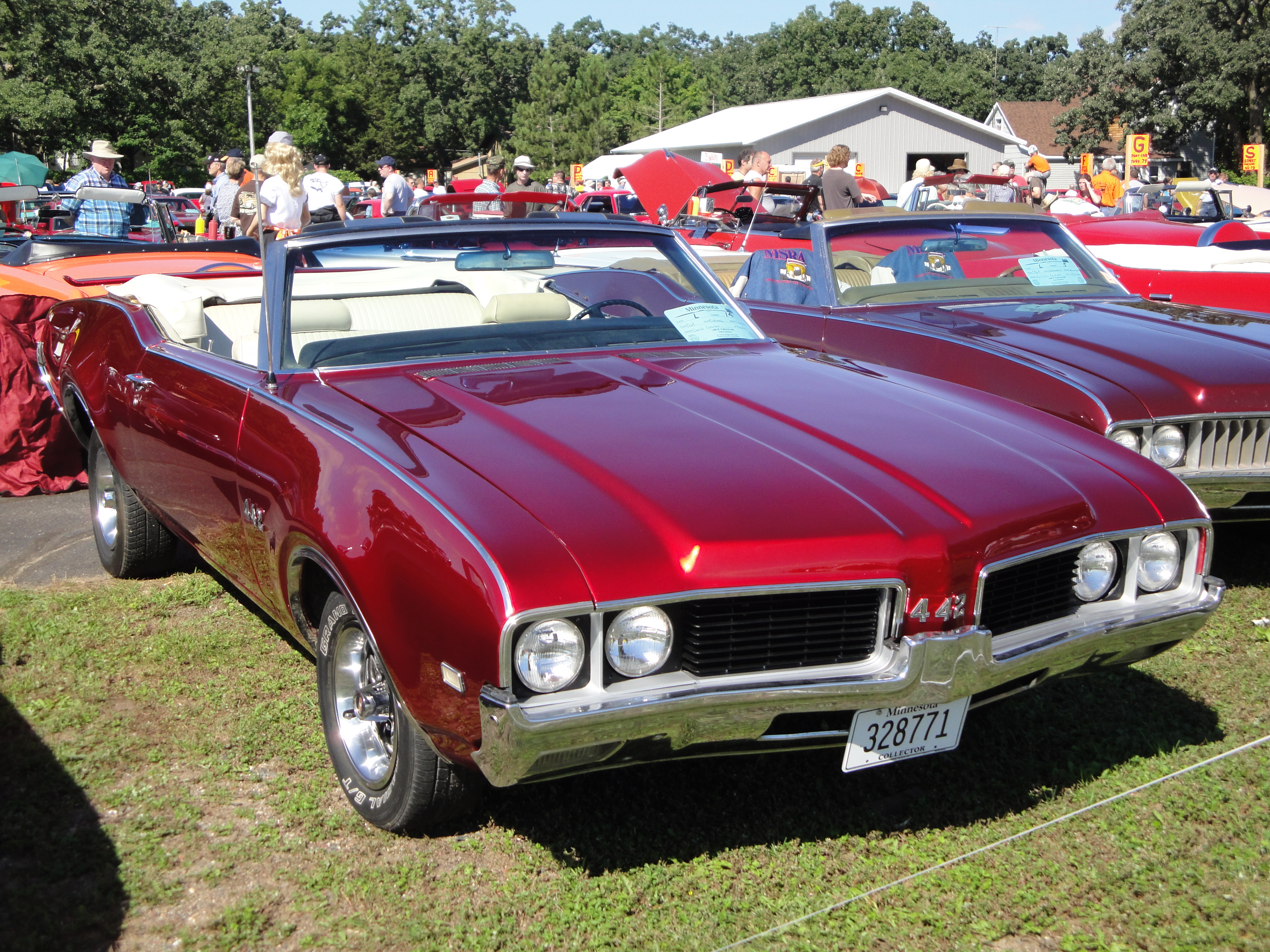
1969 Oldsmobile 4-4-2 convertible

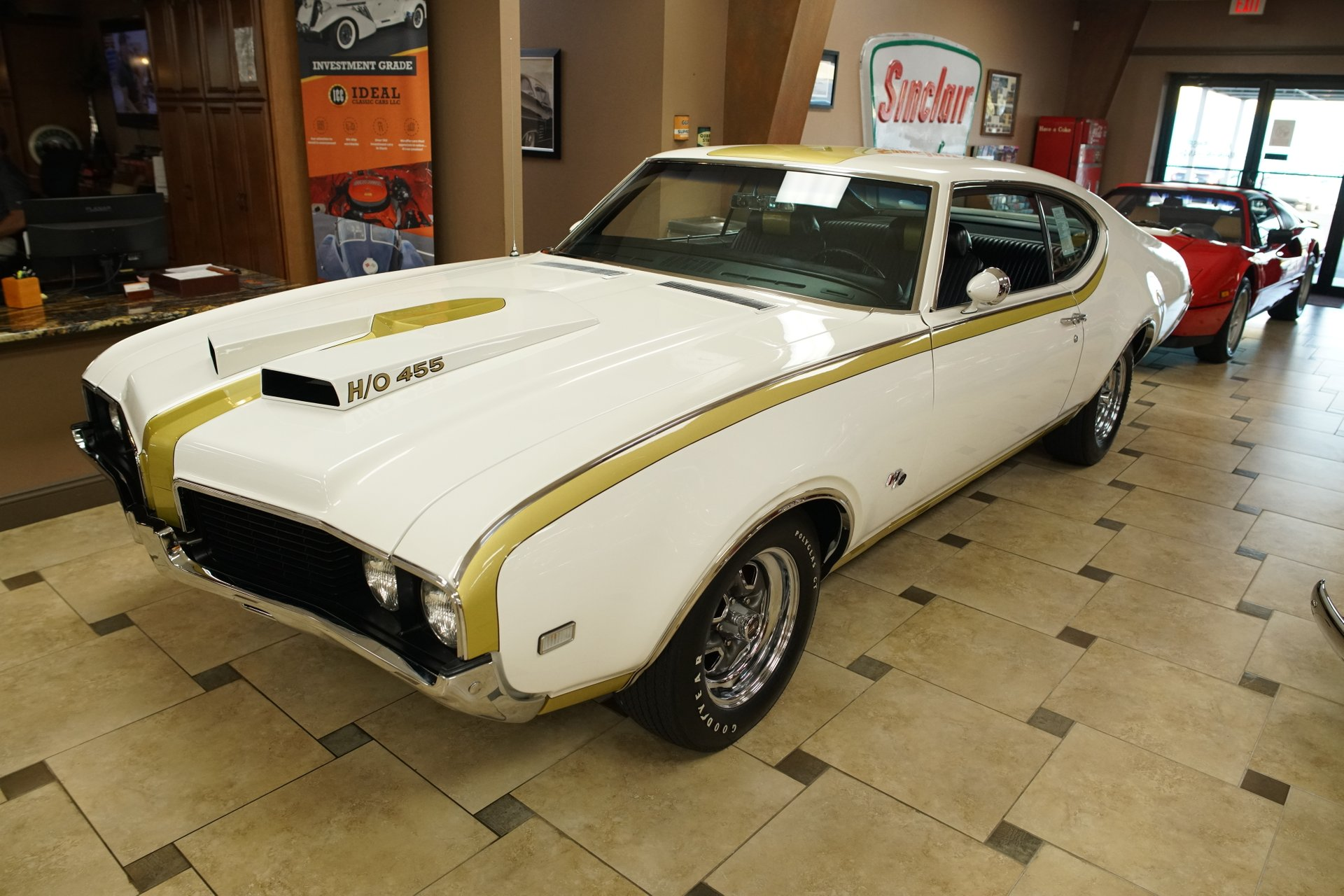
1969 Hurst Oldsmobile on display at Ideal Classic Cars in Venice, Florida.

1969 4-4-2s were very similar to the 1968, except for the division tooth between the grilles, the trunk lid inlets for the taillights, wing windows deleted on Holiday Coupes and convertibles, a steering-lock ignition switch on the steering column, standard headrests added to the front seats, and the paint scheme. Twin hood stripes were now available to highlight the new dual-bulged hood. The 4-4-2 numerals nearly doubled in size. Optional disc brakes had updated single-piston calipers. The exhaust manifolds featured a new center divider for better performance. Other engine changes were minimal, but the Turnpike Cruiser option was deleted. A new optional W-32 high-performance engine was available with an automatic; it came with the W-30's forced-air induction system, but had the base engine's milder cam. A total of 297 were built, including 25 sport coupes and convertibles each.

The Hurst/Olds returned, with a cameo white and fire frost gold striped paint scheme, large functional ram air mailbox hood scoops, rear pedestal spoiler, 15" SSII chrome-plated rims, European racing mirrors, and a 380-horsepower 455 cid V8 that was detuned slightly from 1968. 906 production Hurst/Olds Holiday Coupes were built, plus 6 prototypes and 2 convertibles. Performance was 0–60 in 5.9 seconds, and the 1/4 mile in 14.03 seconds at 101 mph (163 km/h).

=== 1970 ===
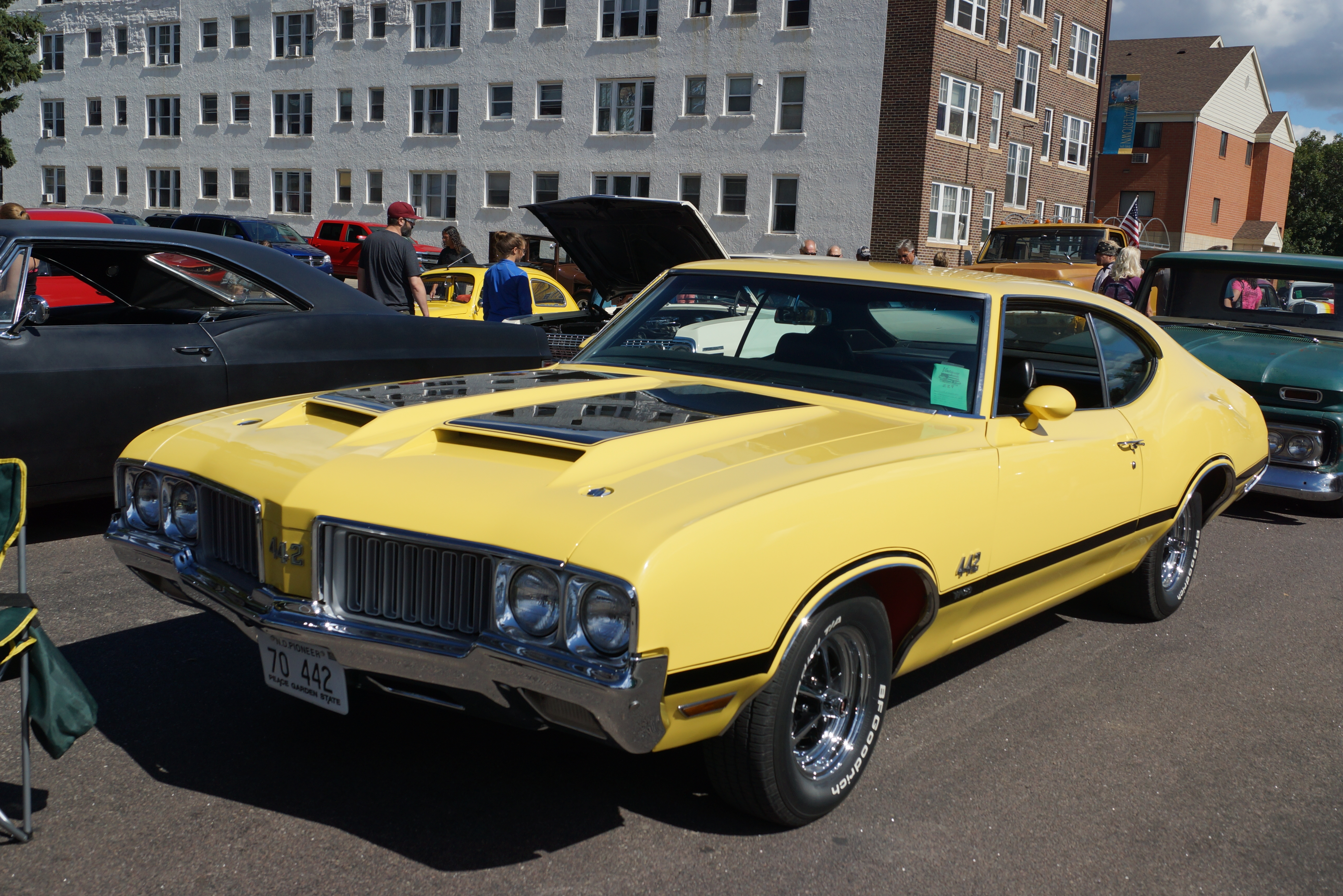
1970 Oldsmobile 4-4-2

1970 was considered the pinnacle of performance from Oldsmobile. In order to keep up in the horsepower arms-race, General Motors dropped the cap on engine size in 1970, and Oldsmobile responded by making the Olds 455 V8 the standard 4-4-2 engine. Output was 365 hp (272 kW) and 500 lb⋅ft (680 N⋅m), with a 370 hp (276 kW) variant available with the W30 option. The 1970 model year can be identified by vertical bars in its chrome grille, rectangular parking lights in the front bumper, and vertical taillights.

The revised body style and increased performance earned the 4-4-2 pace car duties at the Indianapolis 500 in 1970. A high-performance W-30 package was offered, which added a fiberglass hood (option W25) with functional air scoops and a low-restriction air cleaner, aluminum intake manifold, special camshaft, cylinder heads, distributor, and carburetor. Two W-30-equipped 4-4-2 Vista Cruisers were produced by special order. Rear shoulder seat belts were optional at $23.

Motor Trend tested a 4-4-2 W-30 with the four-speed manual transmission and 3.91:1 rear gears, clocking a quarter-mile time of 14.2 seconds at 102 mph (164 km/h). However, the magazine noted that Oldsmobile engineers had earlier posted a best of 13.7 seconds on the same test car with a fresh tune.

New options for the 1970 4-4-2 included GM's variable-ratio power steering (option N47), a console-mounted Hurst Dual/Gate shifter for the Turbo Hydra-matic transmission, and an aluminum differential housing and cover (option W27). All Oldsmobile V8s received new Positive Valve Rotators for the 1970s to increase engine valve life.

=== 1971 ===
Despite an industry-wide softening of muscle car sales, the 4-4-2 returned in 1971 with only minor modifications from the previous year. Engine output was down for 1971 due to a lower compression ratio (8.5:1), which affected all of GM's engines as a result of a corporate policy requiring engines to run on lower-octane regular leaded, low lead, or unleaded gasoline, in preparation for the introduction of the catalytic converter on 1975-model cars. The base 455 was rated at 340 hp (254 kW), with the W-30 achieving a rating of 350 hp (261 kW). The W-27 option was downgraded to an aluminum cover for the cast iron differential housing. The 1971 4-4-2 was available as a hardtop coupe or convertible. The sport coupe disappeared for the first time since 1964, then returned in 1972. 1971 model-year appearance changes included a black grille with silver surround, silver headlight bezels, round parking lights in the front bumper, and horizontal taillights.

Road & Track magazine reported a quarter-mile time of 15.2 seconds at 99 mph (159 km/h), and 0–60 mph in 8.9 seconds, in a car equipped with the TH400 automatic transmission.

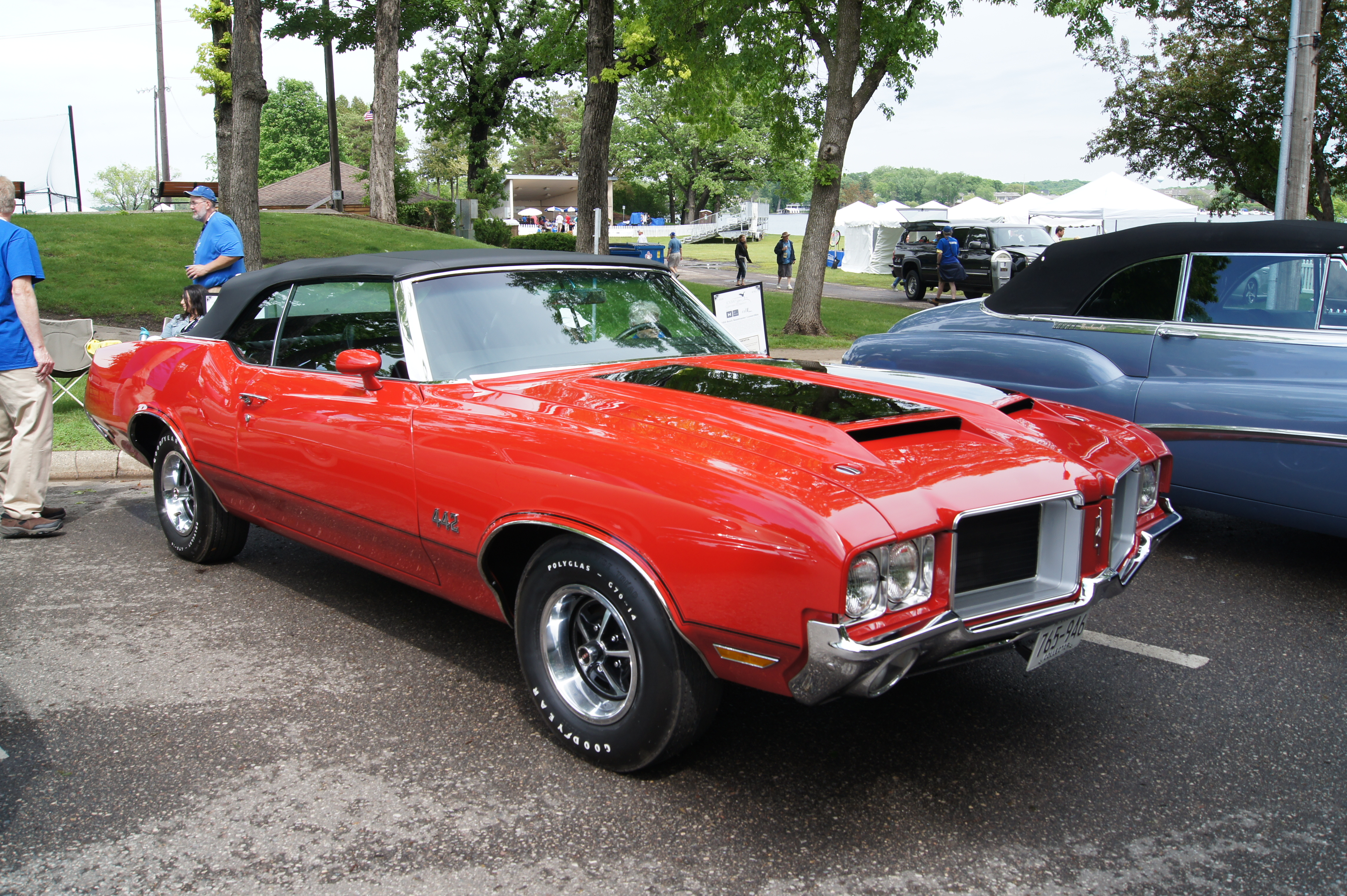
1971 Oldsmobile 4-4-2 convertible

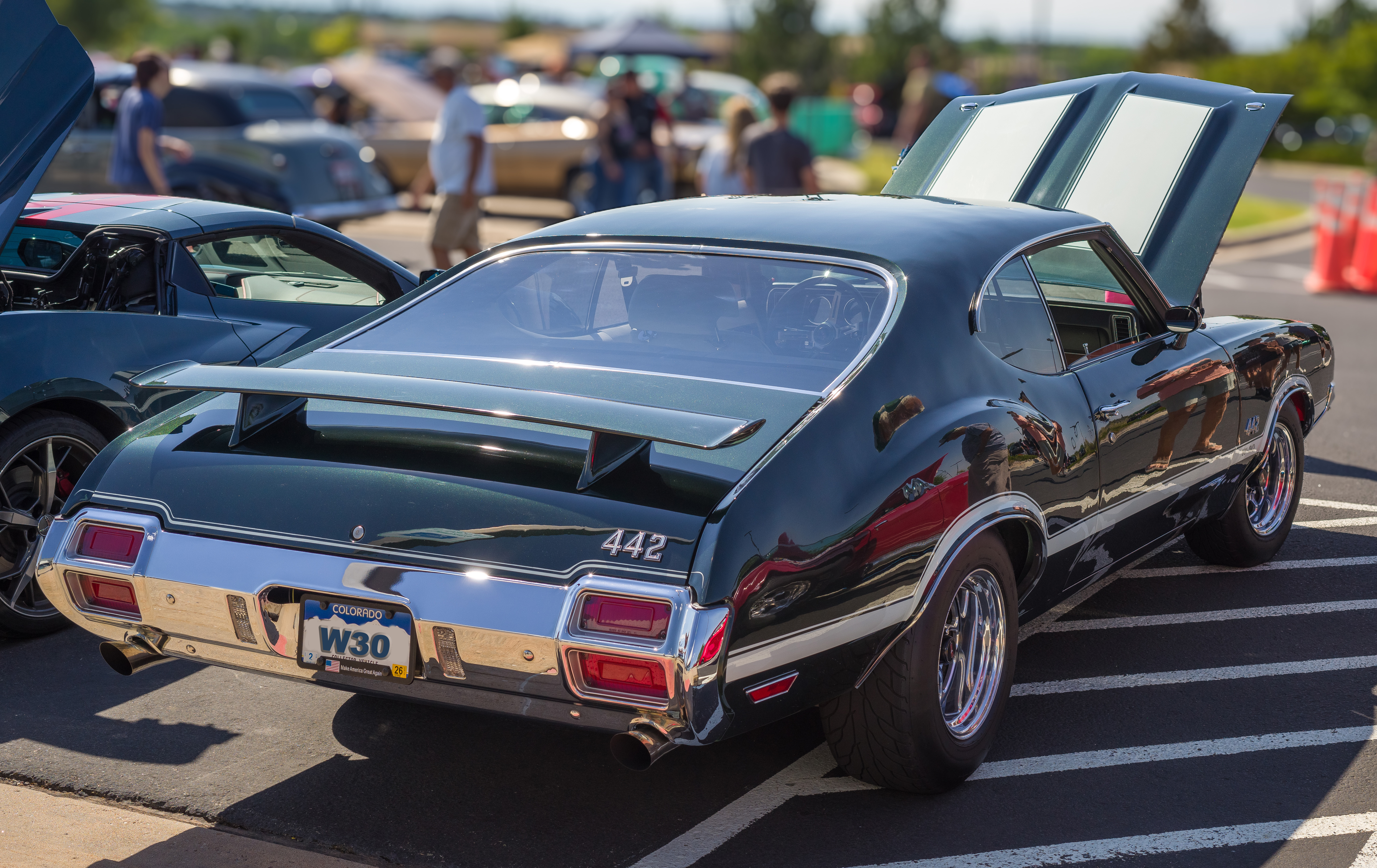
1971 Oldsmobile 442 W30 in Antique Jade Green

=== 1972 ===
By 1972, the muscle car era was clearly in decline because of the twin blows of rising insurance rates and increasingly stringent Federal emissions standards. The 4-4-2 name reverted to an appearance and handling option package (option code W-29) in 1972 on the Cutlass Holiday coupe, Cutlass S sport coupe and Holiday coupe, and Cutlass Supreme convertible. The W-29 option was not available on Cutlass Supreme notchback hardtops. The 4-4-2 option package, which carried a modest sticker price of $29, consisted of the "FE2" suspension upgrades (heavy duty springs & shocks, front and rear sway bars, boxed lower rear control arms, and 14- by 7-in [356- by 178-mm] wheels), side striping, fender and decklid badging, faux hood louvers, and a unique grille. The rear bumper sported cutouts for exhaust tips, but only when paired with the optional L75 455 CID V8 in place of the standard Oldsmobile 350 V8.

Interior trims differed on each 4-4-2 body style, much like the early 1964–66 models. For the base Cutlass hardtop coupe, a basic two-spoke steering wheel, vinyl or cloth/vinyl bench seat, and rubber floor mats were standard; Cutlass S sport coupe and Holiday hardtop coupe featured full carpeting, deluxe steering wheel, courtesy lighting, and bench seats with cloth-and-vinyl or all-vinyl upholstery or optional Strato bucket seats; and the Cutlass Supreme convertible came with more woodgrain interior accents than the "S", along with an all-vinyl notchback bench seat with armrest or no-cost Strato bucket seats; a center console was optional. An AM/FM stereo radio with a tape player was $363.

4-4-2s could still be ordered with the additional W30 option, which included the L77 455 engine, rated at 300 hp (224 kW) and 410 lb⋅ft (556 N⋅m) of torque with standard low-restriction dual exhausts. Other notable W30 components included a lightweight aluminum intake manifold, the W25 fiberglass ram-air hood, an anti-spin differential with 3.42:1 gears (3.73:1 available), and heavy-duty cooling. Because of the low vacuum at idle, air conditioning was not available, and power brakes were available only with an automatic transmission. Only 113 W30 convertibles and 659 W30 coupes were produced in 1972.

A special edition Hurst/Olds paced the Indianapolis 500 in 1972. The H/O coupe was based on the notchback Cutlass Supreme Holiday coupe (not offered with the 4-4-2 option) and the Cutlass Supreme convertible, both of which came standard with a 270-net horsepower 455 Rocket four-barrel V8 or optional 300-net horsepower W-30 option 455. Both H/O engines were mated to Turbo 400 transmissions with console-mounted Hurst Dual Gate shifters. A H/O Vista Cruiser was provided for the Medical Director.

Appearance changes included a silver grille with black surround, black headlight bezels, round parking lights in the front bumper, and 3-section horizontal taillights.

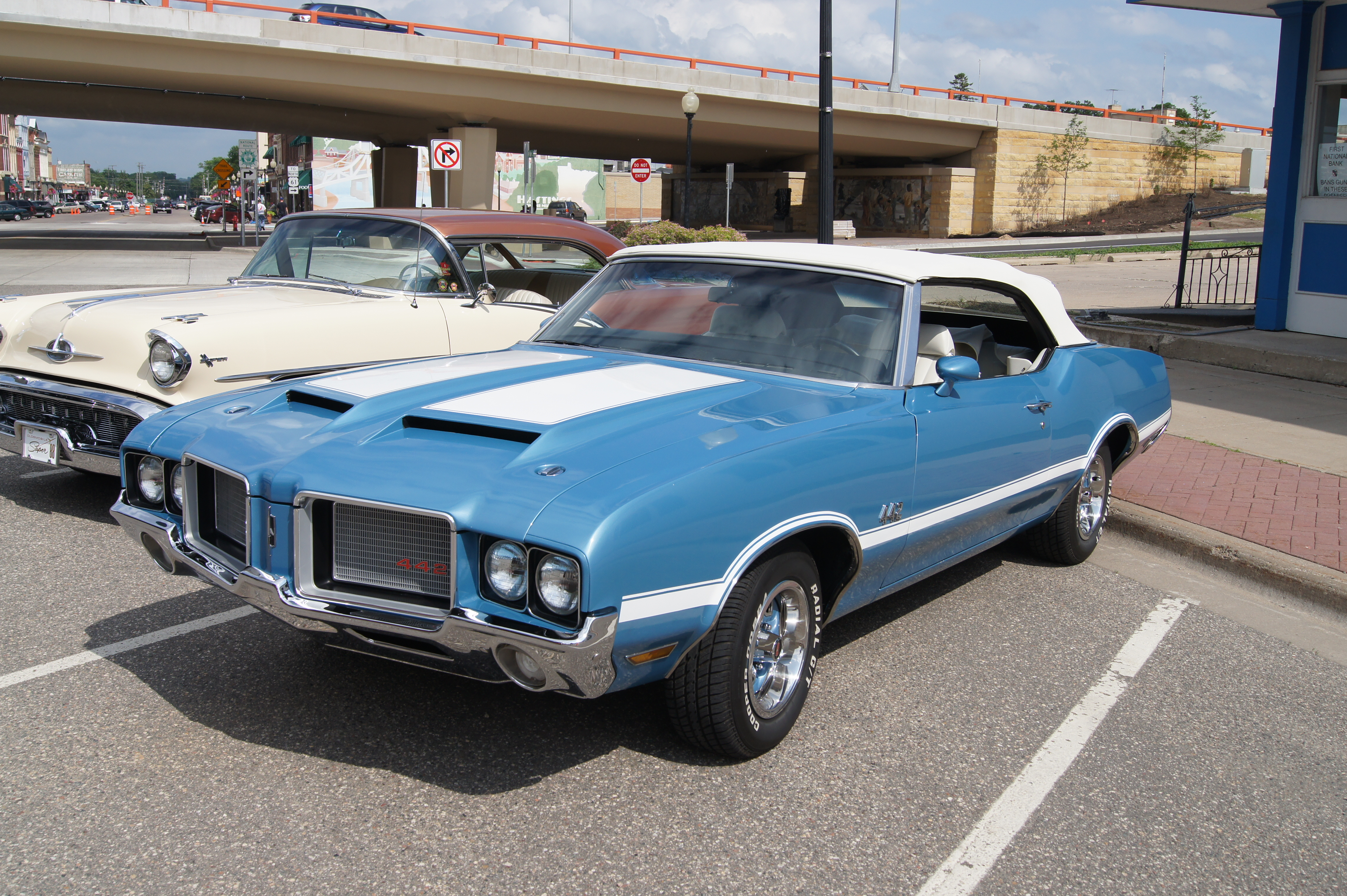
1972 Oldsmobile 442 convertible

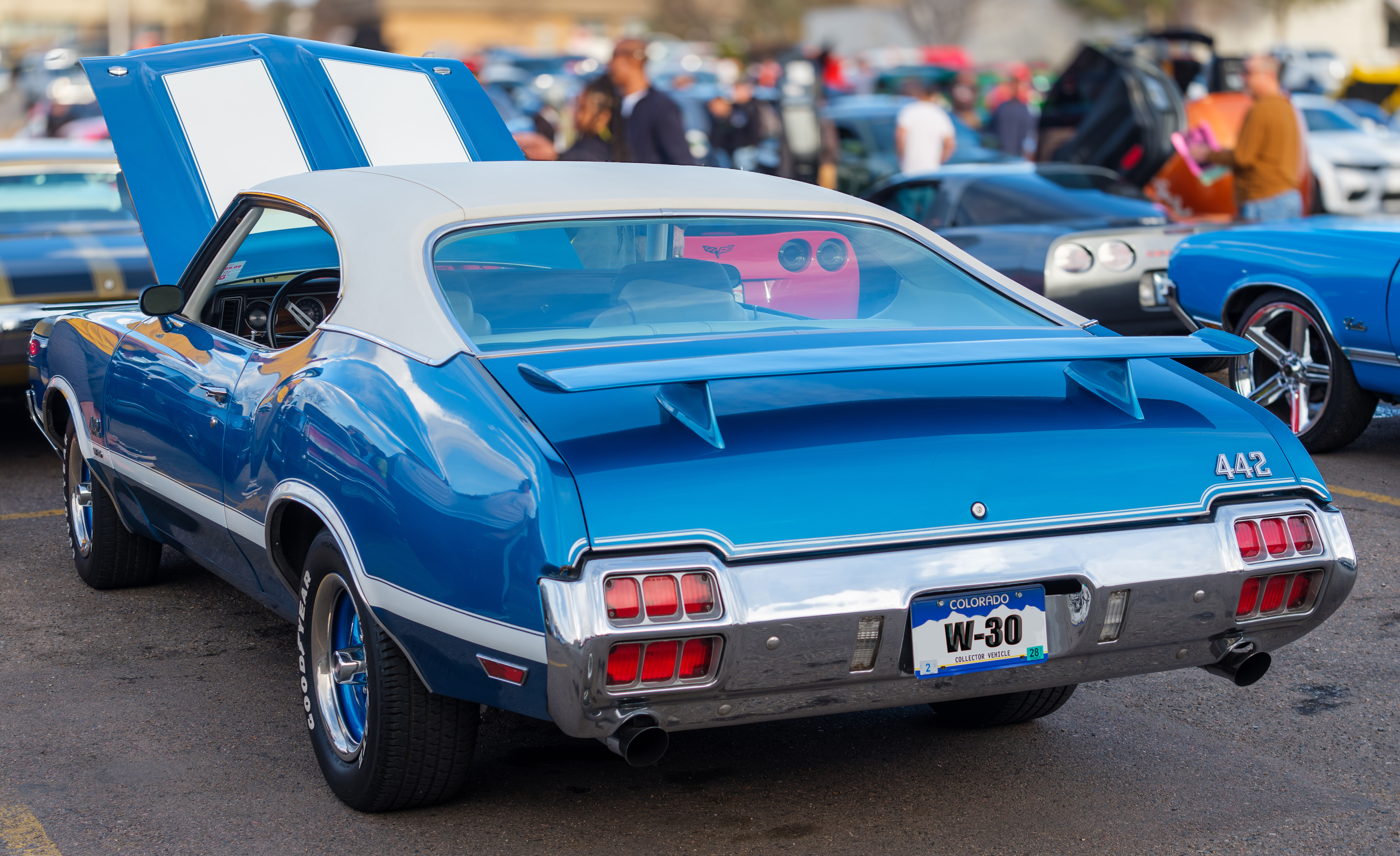
1972 442 W-30 in Viking blue with white trim

== Third generation ==
=== 1973 ===
Third generation
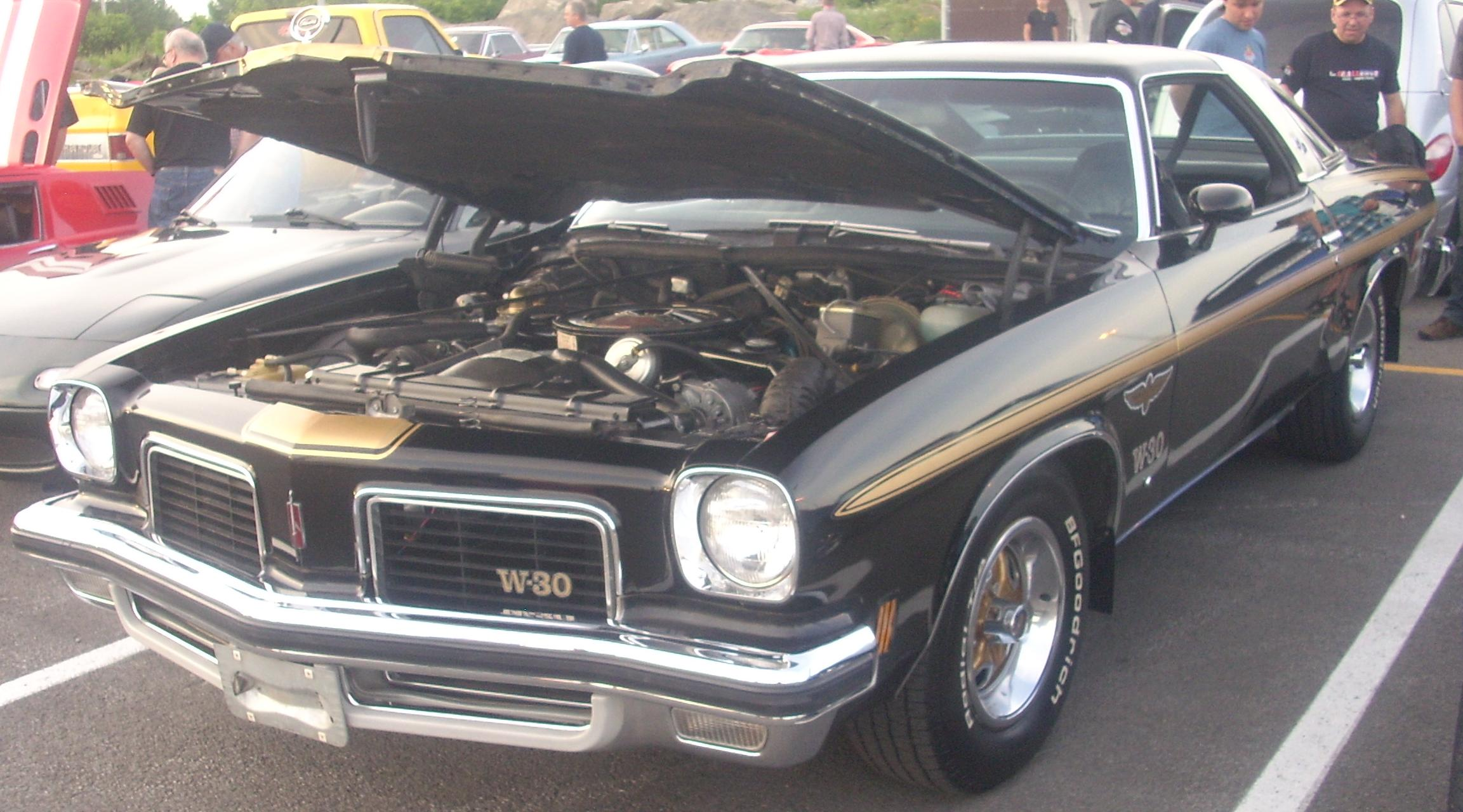

Overview
- Production: 1973–1977
- Assembly: Lansing Car Assembly Lansing, Michigan; Arlington Assembly, Arlington, Texas; Doraville Assembly, Doraville, Georgia; Framingham Assembly, Framingham, Massachusetts

Body and chassis
- Body style: 2-door coupe
- Layout: FR layout
- Platform: A-body
- Related: Chevrolet Chevelle; Chevrolet Monte Carlo; Pontiac LeMans; Pontiac Grand Prix; Pontiac Grand Am; Oldsmobile Cutlass; Oldsmobile Cutlass Supreme; Buick Century; Buick Regal

Powertrain
- Engine: 231 cu in (3.8 L) LD5/LD7 V6; 250 cu in (4.1 L) Turbo-Thrift I6; 261 cu in (4.3 L) LV8 V8; 350 cu in (5.7 L) Rocket V8; 403 cu in (6.6 L) L80 V8; 455 cu in (7.4 L) Rocket V8
- Transmission: 4-speed manual 3-speed manual 3-speed automatic 5-speed manual

Originally expected to debut for the 1972 model year, the new "Colonnade" body style was delayed until 1973 due to an auto workers' strike in 1972. The body was redesigned to feature massive 5-foot (1.5 m) long doors and energy-absorbing bumpers. The rear windows were fixed, and the roof was reinforced in anticipation of government rollover standards. These cars were a few hundred pounds heavier and slightly larger than the 1972's.

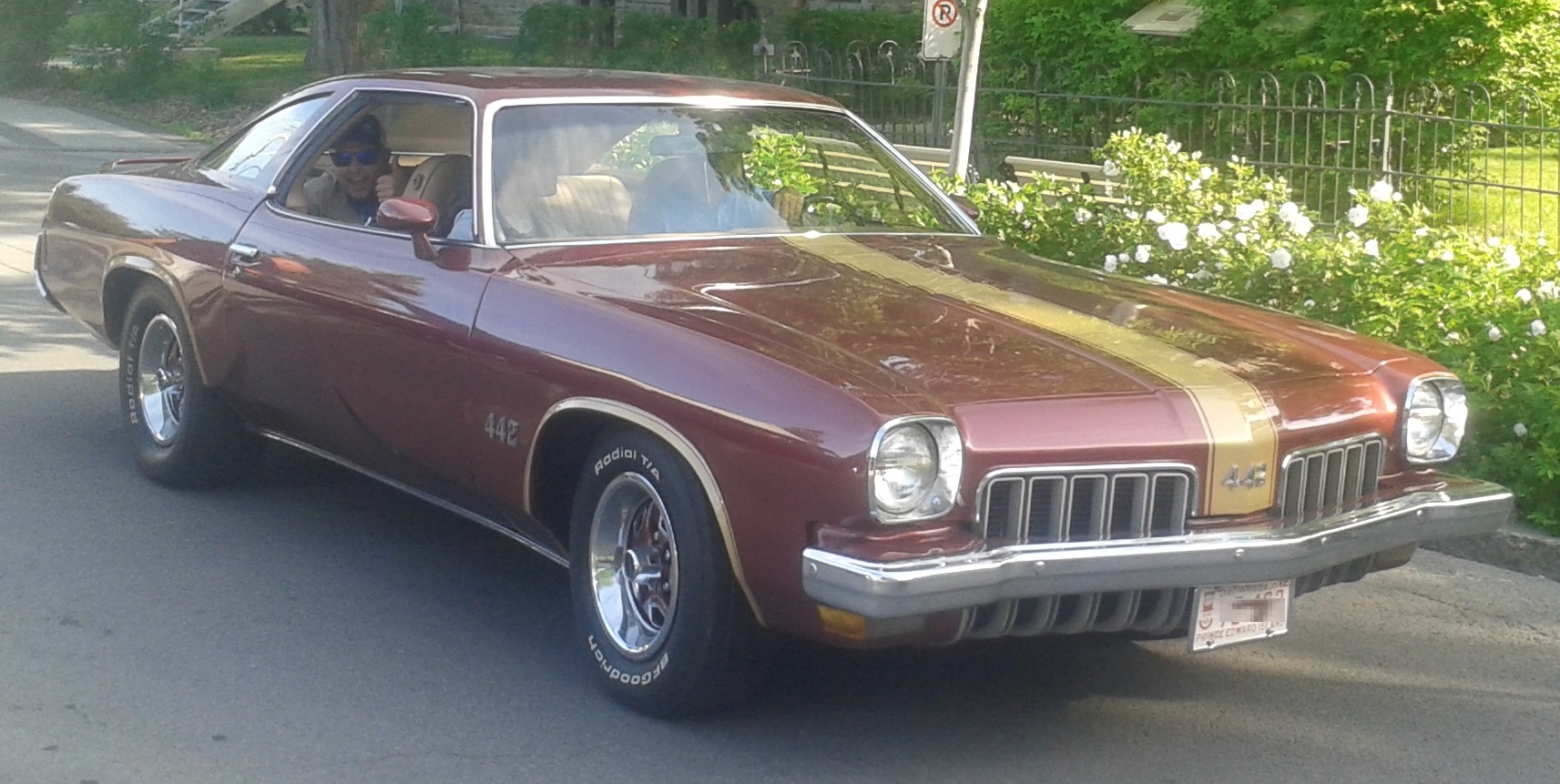
1973 Oldsmobile 442

Consistent with 1972, the 4-4-2 option remained a handling and appearance package (code W-29) and was available on the Cutlass and Cutlass "S". It included a faux louvered hood, FE2 suspension, specific grilles, emblems, and stripes. Items such as dual exhaust and Super Stock wheels were optional, reflecting an industry-wide weaning of U.S. consumers from large, powerful cars. Power figures are all net, rather than the earlier gross units.

The W-30 (which had 300 hp (224 kW) in 1972) had become a trim package. The L77 "V" code 455 was there, but only with the 4-speed wide-ratio M-20 transmission. 1973 was also the last year of the 4-speed manual transmission in the Oldsmobile "A" body. The L77 "V" code produced 270 hp (201 kW), the L75 "U" code 455 AT produced 250 hp (186 kW), while the "K" code 350 single exhaust produced 180 hp (134 kW) and the "M" code 350 with dual exhausts produced 200 hp (149 kW). Positraction rear ends, axle ratios, gauges, Super Stock wheels, HD cooling, and many sport-type options were optional. The L77 "V" code engine was also available in the Hurst/Olds without A/C, code W-46; the W-45 L75 "U" code was standard with A/C. Both 455s used the Turbo Hydra-matic 400 transmission, while the 350 used the Turbo 350.

Interior trims for the 1973 4-4-2 included a cloth/vinyl or all-vinyl bench seat and rubber mats on the base Cutlass coupe, while Cutlass S included full carpeting on the floor and lower door panels, woodgrain trim, a deluxe steering wheel, and a more luxurious cloth-and-vinyl or all-vinyl bench seat, or optional swiveling Strato bucket seats with vinyl trim that could be rotated 90 degrees for easy exit/entry. Center console with floor shifter was optional with either the 4-speed manual or Turbo Hydra-matic transmissions.

=== 1974 ===
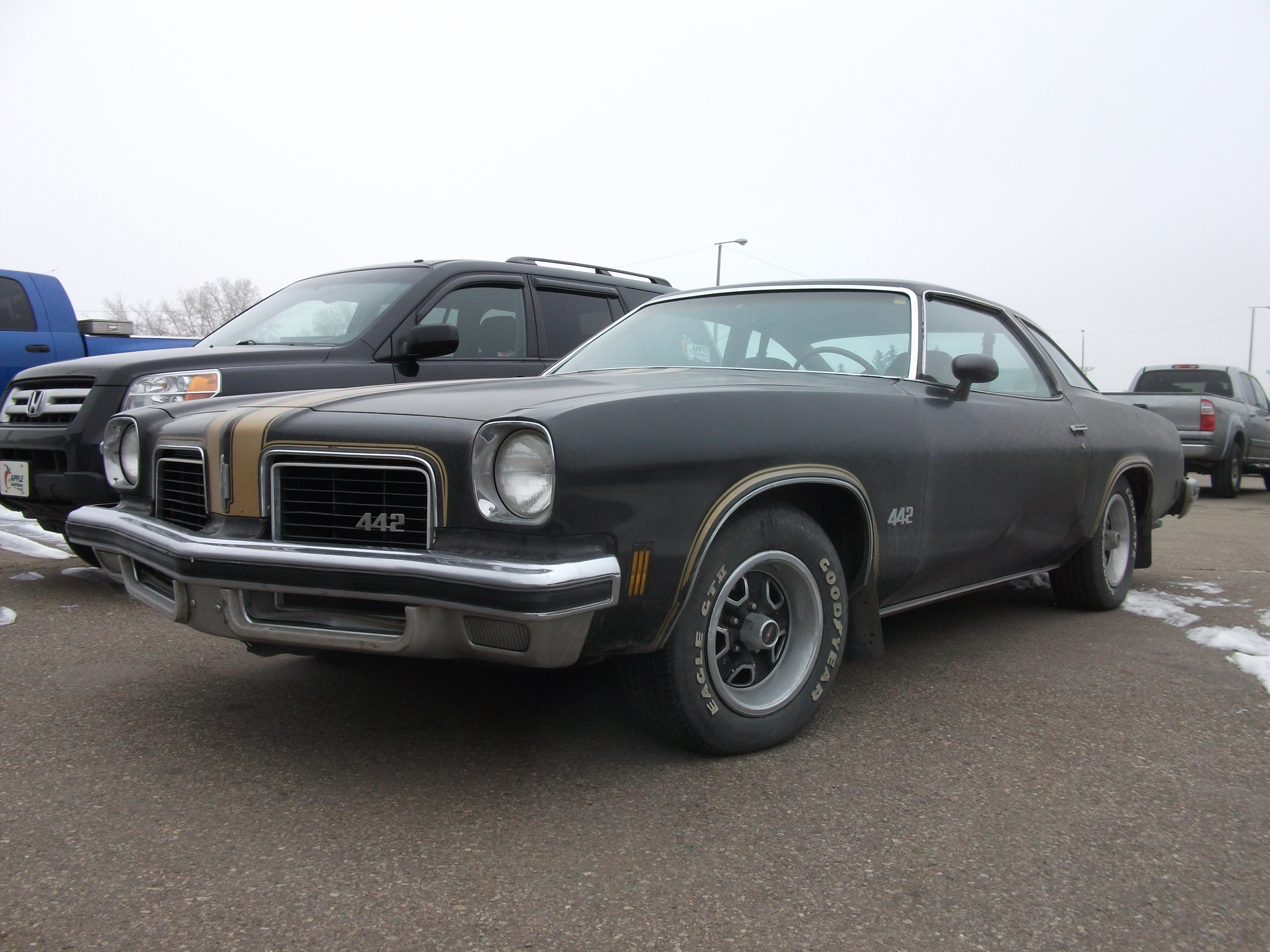
Oldsmobile 4-4-2

The 1974 4-4-2 received the same facelift as other Cutlasses that year, including a revised grille and new flush taillights over a newly mandated 5 mph (8.0 km/h) rear bumper to match the similarly mandated front bumper introduced in '73. It remained a handling and appearance package available on both base Cutlass and Cutlass S Colonnade coupes. Engine offerings included the standard 180 hp (134 kW) Rocket 350 four-barrel V8 or optional 230 hp (172 kW) Rocket 455, which reintroduced the W-30 code that signified the top 4-4-2 engine option package from 1966 to 1972. Power steering and Turbo Hydra-matic transmission became standard equipment on 4-4-2 and all other Cutlass models. The four-speed manual transmission with Hurst shifter was dropped from the option list. GM-specification radial tires were introduced as an option.

Interiors were similar to 1973, with cloth-and-vinyl or all-vinyl bench seats standard, or optional swiveling Strato bucket seats with Moroceen vinyl upholstery. The center console with floor shifter was optional with bucket seats.

=== 1975 ===
The 1975 4-4-2 received revised vertical-bar grilles and continued with vertically stacked taillight lenses. It was once again a handling/appearance package on base Cutlass and Cutlass S coupes with content similar to previous years. Radial tires became standard equipment, along with a GM High Energy electronic ignition.

All engines were mated to catalytic converters, which required unleaded gasoline and ended true dual exhausts. With economy now a selling point following the 1973–74 energy crisis, the 1975 4-4-2 and most other Cutlass models no longer included a V8 engine as standard equipment. For the first time since its 1964 introduction, the 4-4-2 came standard with a six-cylinder engine: Chevrolet's 250 cubic-inch inline unit, previously offered on some Oldsmobile intermediates from 1966 to 1971 and the compact Omega since its 1973 introduction. Also new was a small Oldsmobile-built 260-cubic-inch Rocket V8 designed for fuel economy. The 170-horsepower 350 Rocket V8 was now an extra-cost option along with the 190-horsepower 455 V8. A three-speed manual transmission was reinstated as standard equipment with the six-cylinder engine, with the Turbo Hydra-matic transmission optional with that engine and the only transmission offered with the V8 engines. Interiors again consisted of bench seats with cloth-and-Moroceen vinyl or all-Moroceen trim, or optional swiveling Strato buckets upholstered in Moroceen vinyl. Revised door panels featured pull straps. The console remained an option with bucket seats.

Because Detroit converted from SAE Gross horsepower ratings (commonly referred to as "brake horsepower" (bhp)) to SAE net for the 1972 model year, and because federal emissions standards grew ever more stringent, engine output continued to decline significantly. The 1975 4-4-2 equipped with a 455 was rated by Oldsmobile at just 190 hp at 3400 rpm and 350 lb-ft at 2000 rpm.

=== 1976 ===
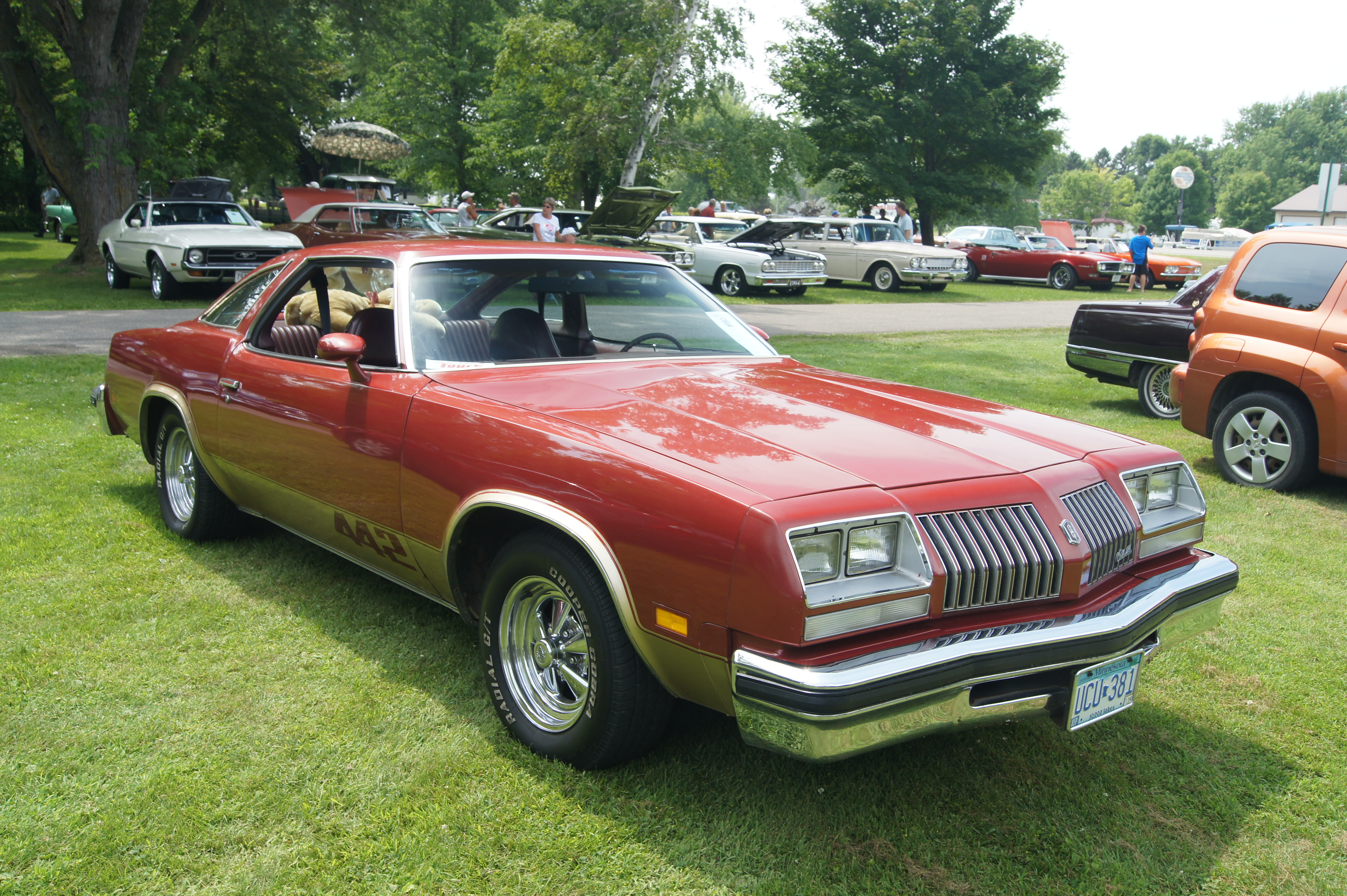
1976 Oldsmobile Cutlass S with 4-4-2 option package and after-market wheels

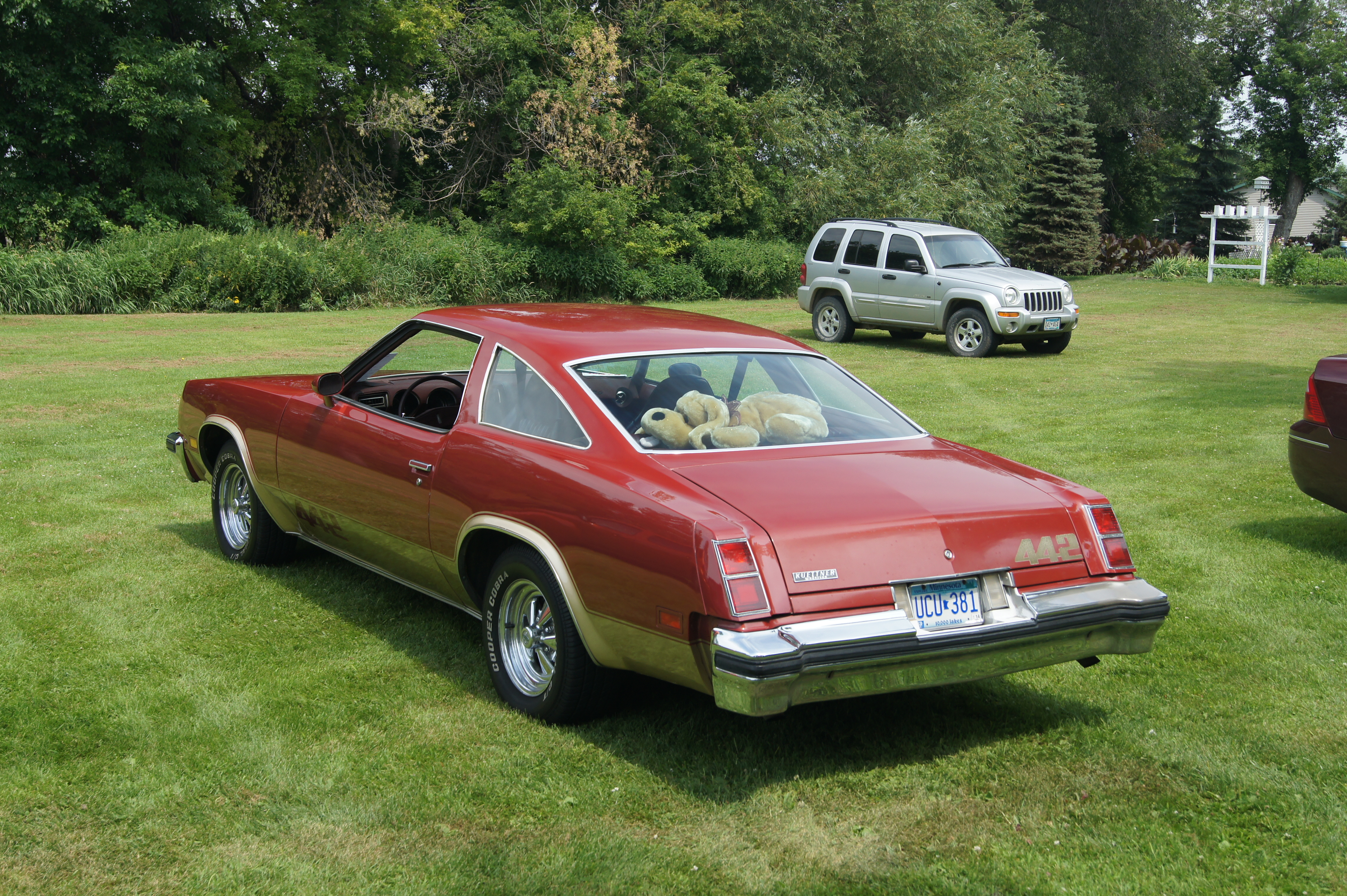
1976 Oldsmobile Cutlass S with 4-4-2 option package and after-market wheels

The 1976 4-4-2 shared a new aerodynamic sloped nose designed for NASCAR, split grilles, and new quad rectangular headlights with Cutlass S models, along with revised lower sheet metal with fewer creases than the 1973–75 models. The 4-4-2 option was offered on Cutlass S coupes and was once again an appearance/handling package. Engine/transmission offerings were unchanged from 1975 except that the 260 V8 could be ordered with a five-speed manual transmission. This was also the final year for the 455 Rocket V8. Interiors again consisted of bench seats with cloth-and-Moroceen vinyl or all-Moroceen trim, or optional swiveling Strato buckets upholstered in Moroceen vinyl. A console was optional with bucket seats.

=== 1977 ===
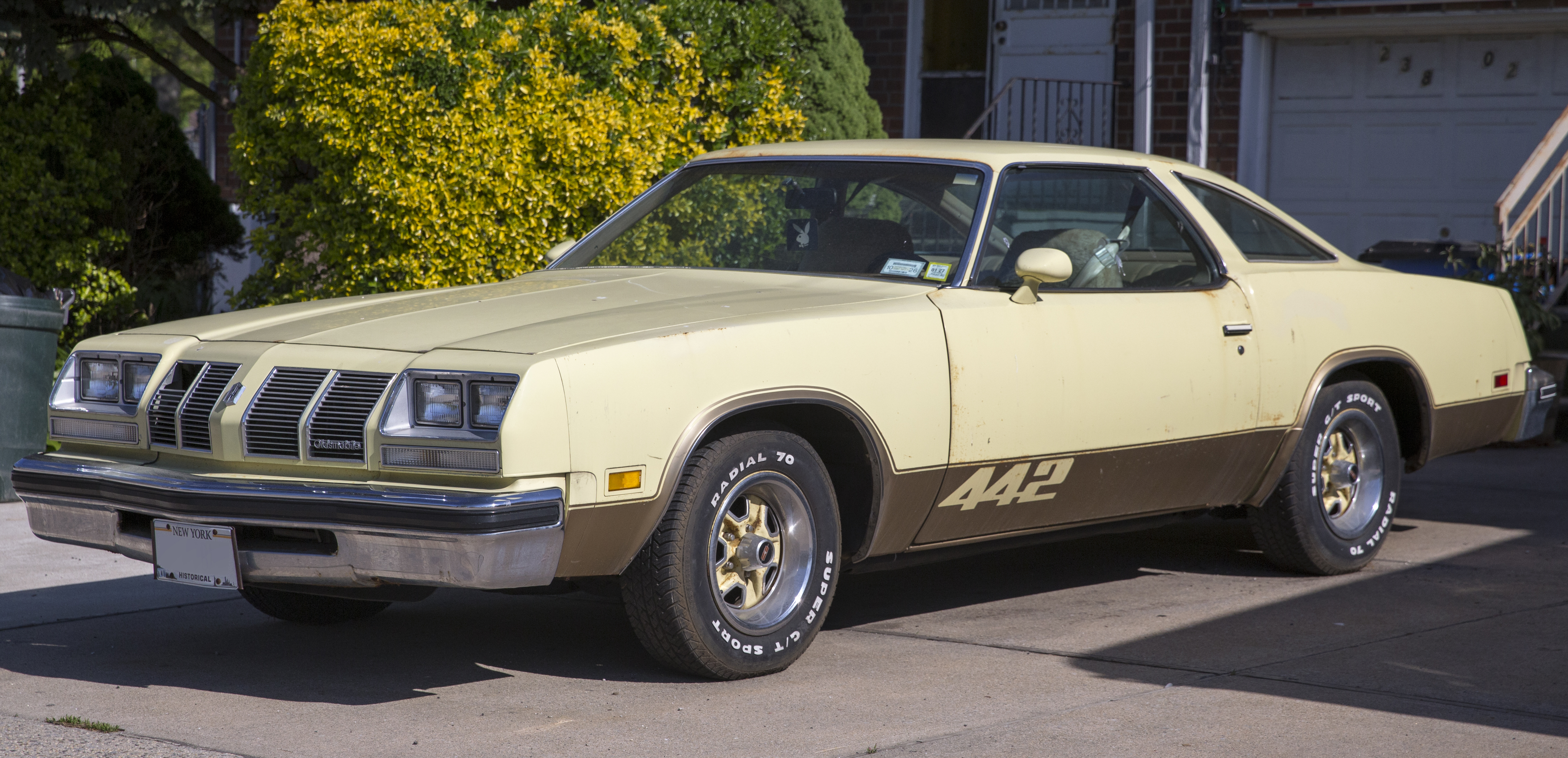
1977 Oldsmobile Cutlass 442

The 1977 model year was the last for the 1973-vintage Colonnade body. The 4-4-2 was the only Oldsmobile intermediate to feature the NASCAR sloped nose from the '76 model, with the Cutlass S switching to an upright nose similar to Cutlass Supreme models. Engine offerings were revised, with Buick's 231 cubic-inch V6 replacing the base model Chevy 250 inline-six, with optional powerplants again including the Oldsmobile-built 260 and 350 cubic-inch Rocket V8s. Replacing the 455 as the top engine was a new Oldsmobile 403 cubic-inch Rocket V8 rated at 185 hp (138 kW) and 320 lb⋅ft (434 N⋅m). Transmission offerings included a three-speed manual or Turbo Hydra-matic with the V6, a five-speed manual or Turbo Hydra-matic for the 260 V8, and Turbo Hydra-matic as the sole option for the 350 and 403 V8s. Interiors included a standard bench seat with cloth-and-vinyl or all-vinyl upholstery, or optional Strato bucket seats with all-vinyl upholstery and without the swiveling feature of previous years. The console remained optional with bucket seats.

== Fourth generation ==
Fourth generation
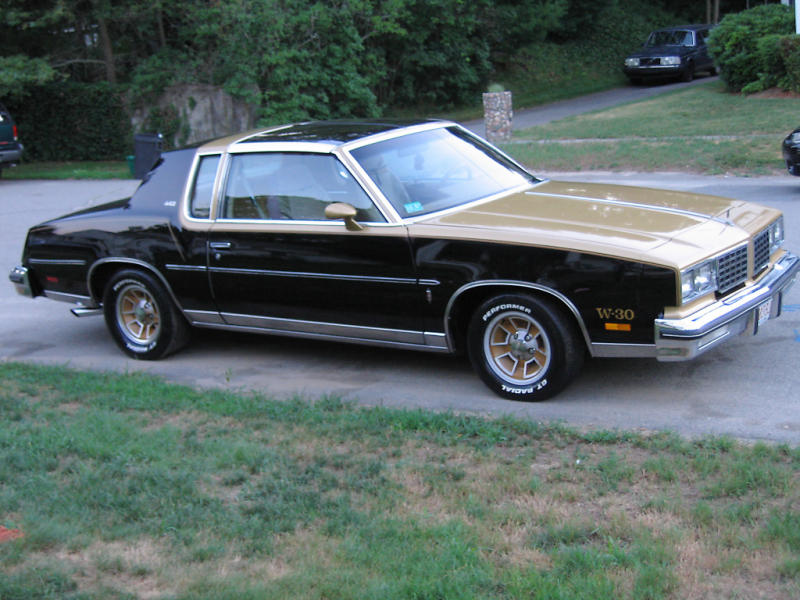
- 1980 442

Overview
- Production: 1978–1980
- Assembly: Lansing, Michigan (Lansing Car Assembly)

Body and chassis
- Body style: 2-door fastback coupe 2-door coupe
- Layout: FR layout
- Platform: A-body
- Related: Chevrolet Malibu; Chevrolet Monte Carlo; Pontiac LeMans; Pontiac Grand Prix; Pontiac Grand Am; Oldsmobile Cutlass; Oldsmobile Cutlass Supreme; Buick Century; Buick Regal

Powertrain
- Engine: 231 cu in (3.8 L) Buick V6; 260 cu in (4.3 L) Oldsmobile V8; 305 cu in (5.0 L) Chevrolet V8; 350 cu in (5.7 L) Oldsmobile V8
- Transmission: 3-speed manual 4-speed manual 3-speed automatic 5-speed manual

=== 1978 ===
The 4-4-2 continued on the downsized A-body platform introduced for 1978. The 1978 4-4-2 was an option package on the semi-fastback "Aeroback" Cutlass Salon, which was now the entry-level trim of the best-selling Cutlass range. It was offered with all powertrains available on the standard Cutlass, including the 231 cu in (3.8 L) two-barrel Buick V6, 260 cu in (4.3 L) two-barrel Oldsmobile V8, and 305 cu in (5.0 L) Chevrolet V8s, in either two- or four-barrel form. A three-speed manual transmission was standard, and a three-speed THM200 automatic was available with all engines; the 260 V8 had a Borg-Warner five-speed manual, and the 305 V8 had a four-speed Saginaw manual.

Distinctive trim elements included contrasting striping along the rocker panels, lower doors, and wheel wells, badging on the rear trunk, and interior emblems. All other options offered on the Cutlass Salon were available with the 4-4-2 package.

=== 1979 ===
The 1979 4-4-2 remained based on the Cutlass Salon body style. The Hurst/Olds rejoined the lineup this year, based on the Cutlass Calais.

=== 1980 ===
The 4-4-2 moved to the notchback Cutlass Calais for 1980, with some of its performance heritage returning as it gained a larger 350 cu in (5.7 L) Oldsmobile V8 engine not available on other Cutlass models. The 231 V6 and the Chevrolet 305 were no longer offered. It included W-30 badging on the front fenders above the side marker lights, with less dramatic graphics than before. Otherwise, the car shared an identical powertrain with the 1979 Hurst/Olds, except for the Hurst shifter. Also available only in gold over white or gold over black paint, 886 were built: 540 in black and 346 in white.

The MSRP of a Cutlass Calais in 1980 was $6,919.57 (~$27,038 in 2025). Option W-30 4-4-2 appearance and handling package consisted of: gold accent paint scheme (Y71), painted grille face, applique pillar molding, aluminum sport wheels, "W-30" decals on front fender, tail lamp bezel and rear window molding to match body color, "442" emblem on sail panel and deck lid, 5.7 liter engine (350 CID) V8, 4-bbl (L34), sport console (D55), Rallye suspension package (FE2), P205/70R14 steel belted radial ply blackwall tires with raised white letters (QFV) and a digital clock (UE8). The W-30 4-4-2 option was not available in California.

The 4-4-2 was not available from 1981 to 1984.

== Fifth generation ==
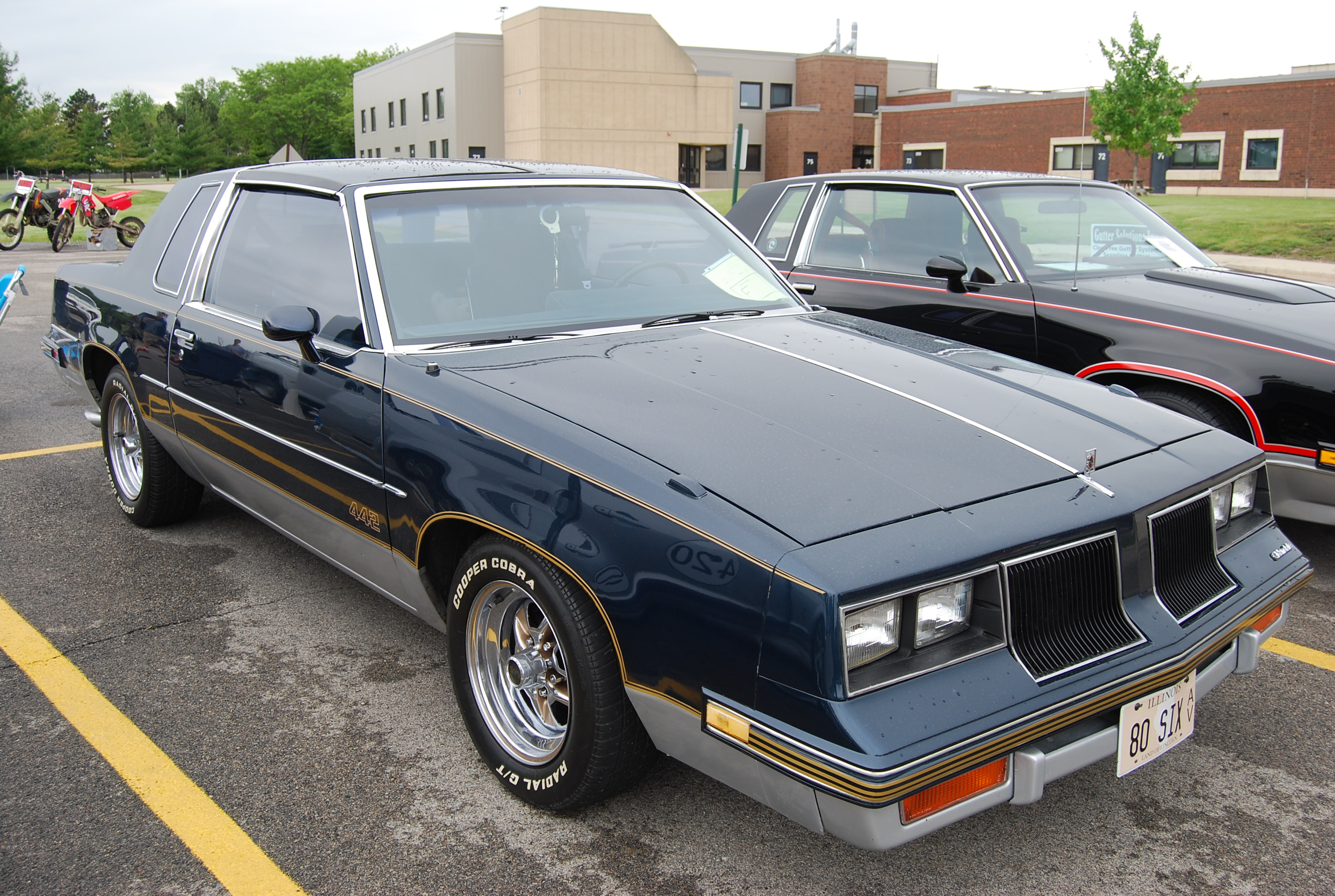
1986 Oldsmobile 4-4-2

The 4-4-2 name was revived in 1985 on the rear-wheel drive G-body Oldsmobile Cutlass Supreme due to the demise of Oldsmobile and Hurst's official collaboration on the Hurst/Olds but Oldsmobile wanted to continue to offer a performance-oriented Cutlass model to the public. The name now referred to the car's four-speed 200r4 automatic transmission, four-barrel carburetor, and two exhausts. This W42 model replaced the 1983 and 1984 Hurst/Olds models and used the same 307 cu in (5.0 L) LG8 V8. The shifter was mounted on the floor in a console between the front seats, and the upgraded F41 suspension package was included. 3,000 were produced in the first year, and all were sold quickly. The company produced 4,273 for 1986 and 4,208 for 1987.

All 1985 and 1986 4-4-2s used the already-sporty Cutlass Salon model as their base platform. Due to cost concerns, for 1987 they decided to use the less-expensive Cutlass Supreme model as the 4-4-2 base. The package included a beefier drivetrain, 15 X 7 fully chromed styled-steel wheels with gold trim, manually inflated air shocks in the rear, a special paint scheme (always silver at the bottom) and gold body stripe decal package, a dual-snorkel air cleaner with a chrome lid, mandatory A/C, and door panel 4-4-2 emblems. With few exceptions (vinyl tops, painted pinstripes, chrome outside mirrors and wire wheel covers, for example), 4-4-2s could be ordered with much of the optional equipment found on other Cutlass models.

The 1984 Hurst/Olds and 1985–87 4-4-2 were equipped with an 8.5-inch GM corporate differential, and all had 3.73:1 ring and pinion final drive gears. Rather than using the weaker 7.5-inch rear differential found in the Monte Carlo SS, these models used the same stout unit found in the Buick Grand National. Many 4-4-2s (and G-body Hurst/Olds) did not come with RPO G80 (limited-slip). This was largely because dealers ordered "packages" that grouped popular options together for ease of ordering. The problem was that the G80 wasn't part of any of those popular option packages, but could be added "a la carte."

The 1983–84 Hurst/Olds and 1985–1987 4-4-2s are distinguishable by a "9" as the engine code in the 8th character of their VINs. These were the only models to get the hotter VIN 9 307 cubic inch engine, and it was the only engine available. From 1983 to 1985, this engine had a flat-tappet valve train and rated at 180 hp/240 lb•ft torque. In 1986, the 307 engine received a roller-camshaft valve train and new swirl-port heads to improve economy and low-end torque. HP dropped to 170, with torque climbing to 255 lb-ft. The 1985 4-4-2 used an OZ code THM 200-4R transmission (as did the 1983–84 Hurst/Olds). Both 1986 and 1987 4-4-2 used the KZF code THM 200-4R. The KZF removed much of the shift harshness of the original OZ-coded transmissions, but was still firmer than the run-of-the-mill overdrive transmissions used in the rest of Oldsmobile's lineup.

== Sixth generation ==
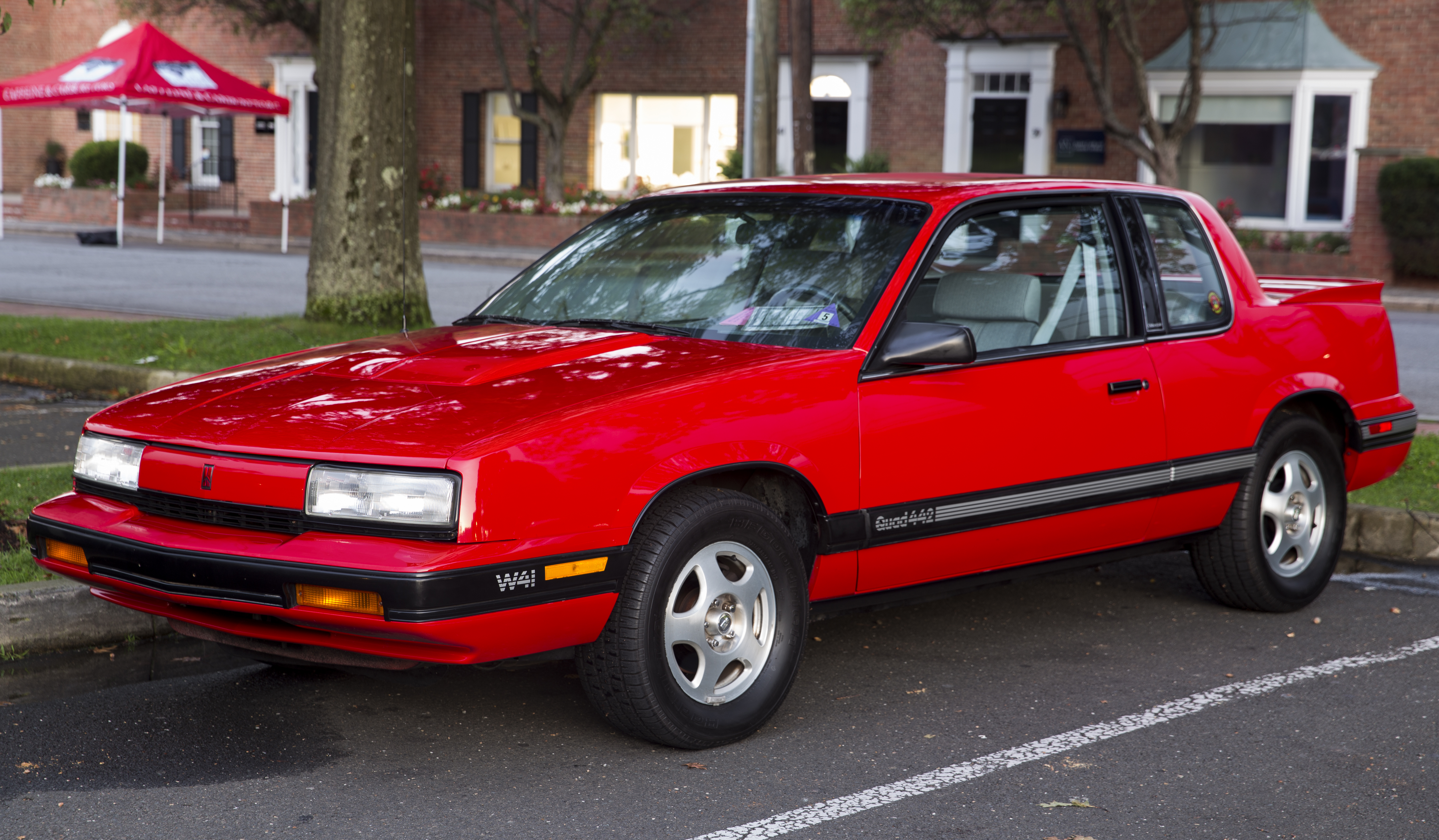
1991 Oldsmobile Cutlass Calais Quad 442 W41

The 442 option was revived on the Quad 442 front-wheel drive 1990–1991 Cutlass Calais. This model used a 2.3 L LG0 Quad-4 four-cylinder engine with four valves per cylinder and two camshafts. The engine was tuned with higher-output camshafts, which produced more top-end power at the expense of idle quality. It used a single exhaust with a dual-tipped muffler and produced 180 hp (134 kW) with a five-speed manual transmission.

This version of the 442 also used the "W-30" option code from earlier 442s, except that this model used the "W-40" option code. A low-production, late 1991 model year version used the option code "W-41"; the key differences of the "W-41" package were a 190 hp (142 kW) engine with a differently geared five-speed transmission, plus silver striping and lettering on the body side molding in place of the W-40's gold.

This 442 model lasted just two years.

Production totals:

1990 "W-40" = 2,629

1991 "W-40" = 1,160

1991 "W-41" = 204

GM literature referred to the 1992 and 1993 Oldsmobile Achieva SCX as a 442, the last time it used the designation. The Achieva SCX used the same "W41" drivetrain as the very limited-production 1991 Quad 442 W41.

== Engines ==
- 1968-69 Oldsmobile 400 CID 4-barrel V8 (3.87 in (98 mm) bore and 4.25 in (108 mm) stroke) 290 hp
- 1970 Oldsmobile 455 CID 4-barrel V8 (4.126 in (104.8 mm) bore and 4.25 in (108 mm) stroke) 370 hp
- 1971 Oldsmobile 455 CID 4-barrel V8 (4.126 in (104.8 mm) bore and 4.25 in (108 mm) stroke) 340 hp; W30 350 hp
- 1972 L32 350 CID 2-barrel V8, (160 hp and 275 lb⋅ft (373 N⋅m) in 1972) [H or J in VIN]
- 1972 L34 350 CID 4-barrel V8, (180 hp and 275 lb⋅ft (373 N⋅m) in 1972) [K in VIN]
- 1972 L34 350 CID 4-barrel V8 w/N10 dual exhaust, (200 hp and 275 lb⋅ft (373 N⋅m) in 1972) [M in VIN]
- 1972 W30 455 CID 4-barrel V8, (300 hp and 410 lb⋅ft (556 N⋅m) in 1972) [X in VIN w/ TH400 and M20]
- 1972 L75 455 CID 4-barrel V8, (250 hp w/ TH400 and 370 lb⋅ft (502 N⋅m) in 1972) [U in VIN]
- 1972 L75 455 CID 4-barrel V8, (270 hp w/ M20 and 370 lb⋅ft (502 N⋅m) in 1972) [V in VIN] – used 2.07 valves and W30 automatic camshaft
- 1973–1976 455 CID V8
- 1973–1977, 1980 350 CID V8

== In popular culture ==
The Blondie song Detroit 442 from the Plastic Letters album is a reference to the Oldsmobile 442.
