= List of highways numbered 443 =

Highway 443, or Route 443 may refer to the following roads.

== Canada ==
- Manitoba Provincial Road 443

== Germany ==
- Bundesautobahn 443

== Israel ==
- Route 443 (Israel)

== Japan ==
- Japan National Route 443

== United States ==
- Indiana State Road 443
- Louisiana Highway 443
- Maryland Route 443 (former)
- Nevada State Route 443
- New York State Route 443
- Pennsylvania Route 443
- Puerto Rico Highway 443

Preceded by 442	Lists of highways 443	Succeeded by 444
