= 442 BC =

442 BC in various calendars
- Gregorian calendar: 442 BC; CDXLII BC
- Ab urbe condita: 312
- Ancient Egypt era: XXVII dynasty, 84
- Pharaoh: Artaxerxes I of Persia, 24
- Ancient Greek Olympiad (summer): 84th Olympiad, year 3
- Assyrian calendar: 4309
- Balinese saka calendar: N/A
- Bengali calendar: −1035 – −1034
- Berber calendar: 509
- Buddhist calendar: 103
- Burmese calendar: −1079
- Byzantine calendar: 5067–5068
- Chinese calendar: 戊戌年 (Earth Dog); 2256 or 2049 — to — 己亥年 (Earth Pig); 2257 or 2050
- Coptic calendar: −725 – −724
- Discordian calendar: 725
- Ethiopian calendar: −449 – −448
- Hebrew calendar: 3319–3320
- Hindu calendars
- Vikram Samvat: −385 – −384
- Shaka Samvat: N/A
- Kali Yuga: 2659–2660
- Holocene calendar: 9559
- Iranian calendar: 1063 BP – 1062 BP
- Islamic calendar: 1096 BH – 1095 BH
- Javanese calendar: N/A
- Julian calendar: N/A
- Korean calendar: 1892
- Minguo calendar: 2353 before ROC 民前2353年
- Nanakshahi calendar: −1909
- Thai solar calendar: 101–102
- Tibetan calendar: ས་ཕོ་ཁྱི་ལོ་ (male Earth-Dog) −315 or −696 or −1468 — to — ས་མོ་ཕག་ལོ་ (female Earth-Boar) −314 or −695 or −1467

Year 442 BC was a year of the pre-Julian Roman calendar. At the time, it was known as the Year of the Consulship of Vibulanus and Helva (or, less frequently, year 312 Ab urbe condita). The denomination 442 BC for this year has been used since the early medieval period, when the Anno Domini calendar era became the prevalent method in Europe for naming years.

== Events ==
=== By place ===
==== Greece ====
- As a result of his failure to effectively challenge Pericles, the Athenian citizens ostracise Thucydides for 10 years and Pericles is once again unchallenged in Athenian politics.

=== By topic ===
==== Literature ====
- Sophocles writes Antigone.

== Deaths ==
- Zhou zhen ding wang, king of the Zhou dynasty of China
