= List of highways numbered 442 =

The following highways are numbered 442:

== Canada ==
- Manitoba Provincial Road 442

== Japan ==
- Japan National Route 442

== United States ==
- Florida State Road 442
- Louisiana Highway 442
- Maryland Route 442
- New York State Route 442
- Pennsylvania Route 442
- Puerto Rico Highway 442
- Farm to Market Road 442

Preceded by 441	Lists of highways 442	Succeeded by 443
