= Awa-Ōmiya Station =

Railway station in Itano, Tokushima prefecture, Japan

T08 Awa-Ōmiya Station 阿波大宮駅
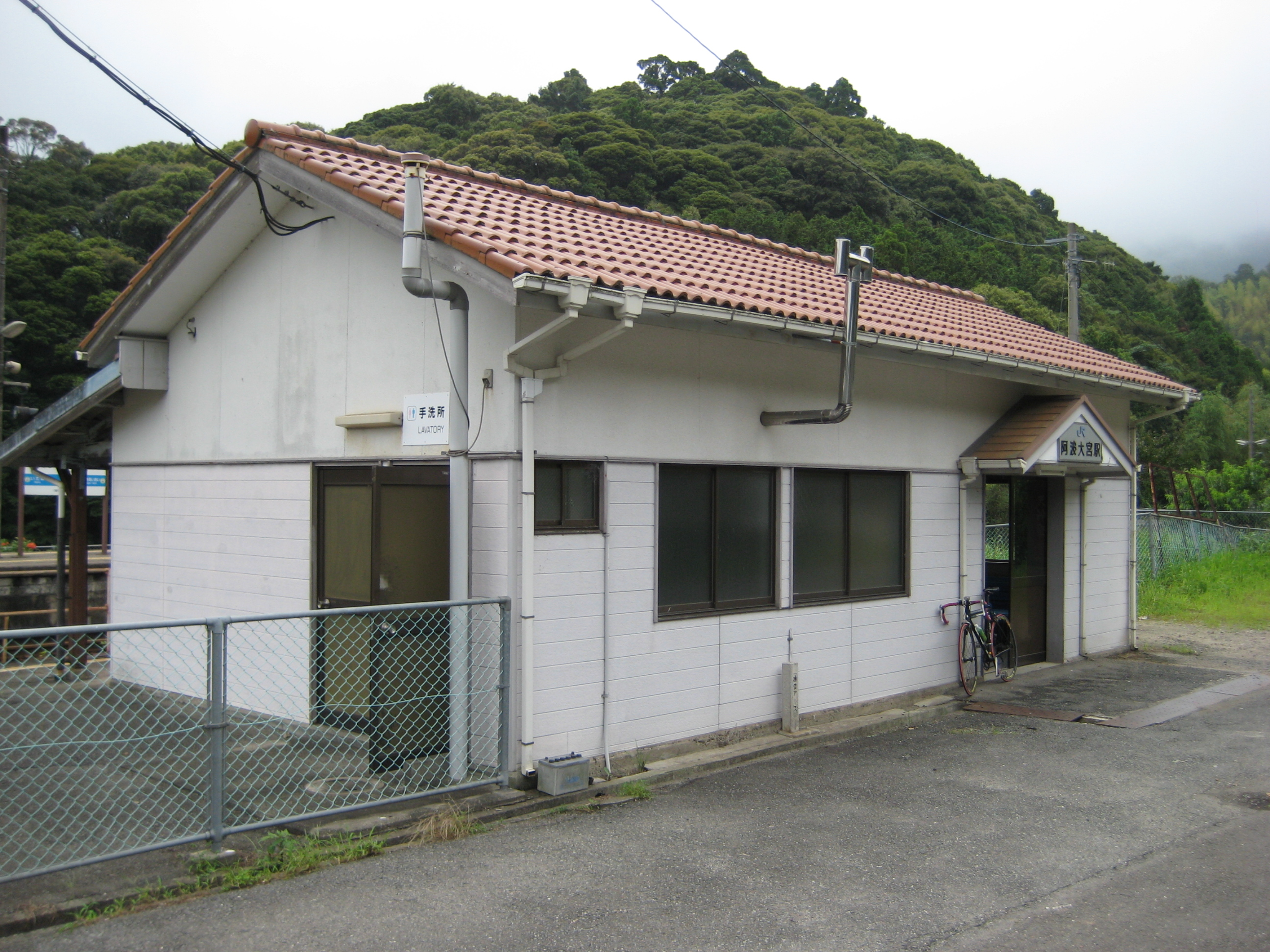
- Awa-Omiya Station in July 2007

General information
- Location: Kawahigashi Ōsaka, Itano Town, Itano District, Tokushima Prefecture 779-0101; Japan
- Coordinates: 34°10′44″N 134°26′55″E
- Operator: JR Shikoku
- Line: Kōtoku Line
- Distance: 53.2 km (33.1 mi) from Takamatsu
- Platforms: 1 island platform
- Tracks: 2

Construction
- Structure type: At grade
- Accessible: No - island platform accessed by footbrige

Other information
- Status: Unstaffed
- Station code: T08

History
- Opened: 20 March 1935; 91 years ago

Passengers
- FY2019: 4 (daily)

Services
Preceding station	JR Shikoku	Following station
Sanuki-Aioi T09 towards Takamatsu	Kōtoku Line	Itano T07 towards Tokushima
Uzushio does not stop here
Location
- Location within Tokushima Prefecture Location within Japan

Awa-Ōmiya Station (阿波大宮駅, Awa-Ōmiya-eki) is a passenger railway station located in the town of Itano, Itano District, Tokushima Prefecture, Japan. It is operated by JR Shikoku and has the station number "T08".

== Lines ==
Awa-Ōmiya Station is served by the JR Shikoku Kōtoku Line and is located 53.2 km from the beginning of the line at Takamatsu. Only local services stop at the station.

== Layout ==
The station consists of an island platform serving two tracks. The station building beside the tracks is unstaffed and serves only as a waiting room. Access to the island platform is by means of a footbridge.

=== Platforms ===
1	Kōtoku Line	for Itano and Tokushima
2	Kōtoku Line	for Sambommatsu and Takamatsu

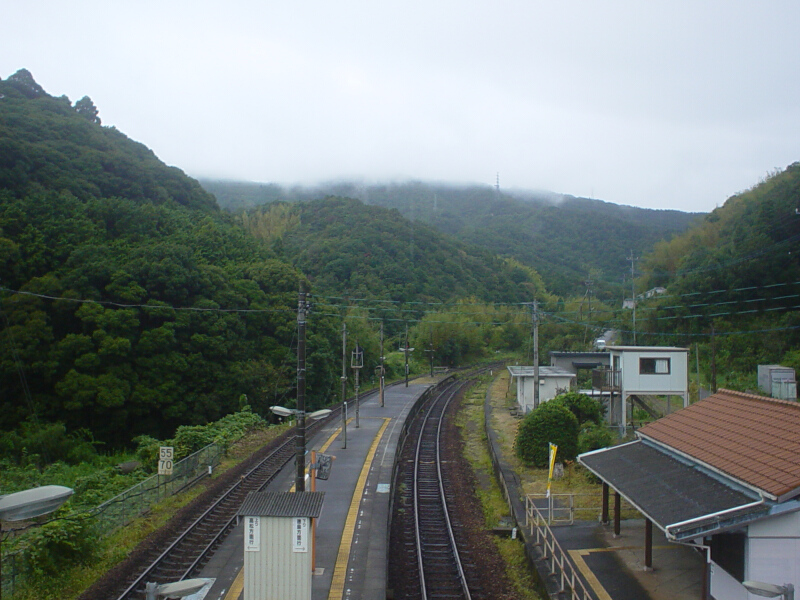
A view of the station platforms and tracks, looking in the direction of Takamatsu.

== History ==
Awa-Ōmiya Station was opened on 20 March 1935 as an intermediate stop when the Kōtoku Line was extended eastwards from Hiketa to link up with an existing track at Itano to establish a through-service to Sako. At that time the station was operated by Japanese Government Railways, later becoming Japanese National Railways (JNR). With the privatization of JNR on 1 April 1987, control of the station passed to JR Shikoku. In 2019, the station's bathroom was permanently closed.

== Surrounding area ==
The station located in the mountainous area on the way from central Itano to the crossing of Osaka Pass.

- Takamatsu Expressway
- Itano Municipal Itano Higashi Elementary School Osaka Branch School

== See also ==
- List of railway stations in Japan
