= Sanuki-Aioi Station =

Railway station in Higashikagawa, Kagawa prefecture, Japan

T09 Sanuki-Aioi Station 讃岐相生駅
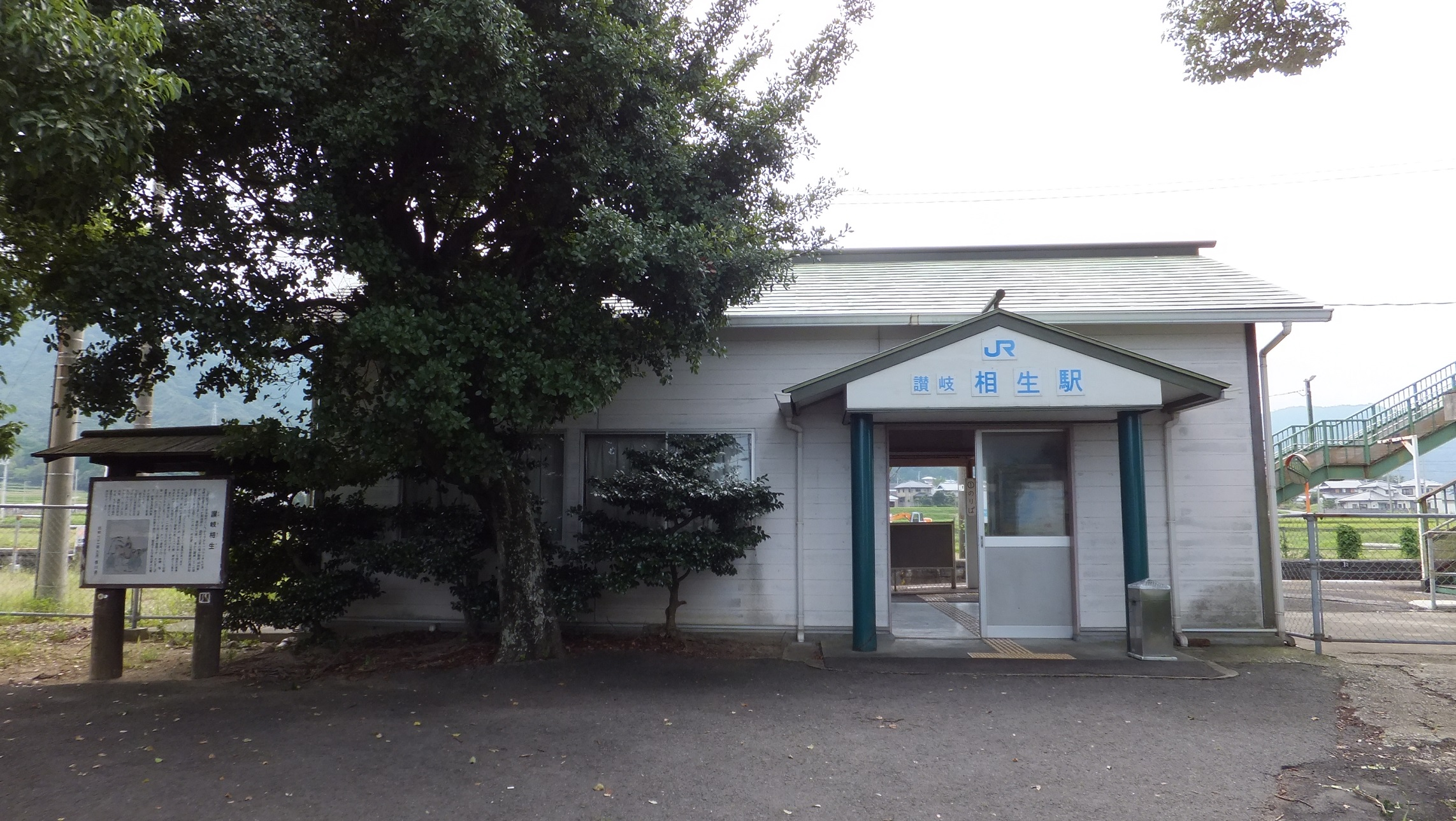
- Sanuki-Aioi Station in 2015

General information
- Location: 8-2-3 Minamino, Higashikagawa City, Kagawa Prefecture 769-2903; Japan
- Coordinates: 34°12′42″N 134°25′29″E
- Operator: JR Shikoku
- Line: Kōtoku Line
- Distance: 47.6 km (29.6 mi) from Takamatsu
- Platforms: 2 side platforms
- Tracks: 2

Construction
- Structure type: At grade
- Accessible: No - platforms linked by footbrige

Other information
- Status: Unstaffed
- Station code: T09

History
- Opened: 20 March 1935; 91 years ago

Passengers
- FY2019: 28

Services
Preceding station	JR Shikoku	Following station
Hiketa T10 towards Takamatsu	Kōtoku Line	Awa-Ōmiya T08 towards Tokushima
Uzushio does not stop here
Location
- Location within Kagawa Prefecture Location within Japan

Sanuki-Aioi Station (讃岐相生駅, Sanuki-Aioi-eki) is a passenger railway station located in the city of Higashikagawa, Kagawa Prefecture, Japan. It is operated by JR Shikoku and has the station number "T09".

== Lines ==
Sanuki-Aioi Station is served by the JR Shikoku Kōtoku Line and is located 47.6 km from the beginning of the line at Takamatsu. Only local services stop at the station.

== Layout ==
The station consists of two opposed side platforms serving two tracks. The station building is unstaffed and serves only as a waiting room. Access to the opposite platform is by means of a footbridge. It is also possible to access platform 2 from a road running behind it by means of a short flight of steps.

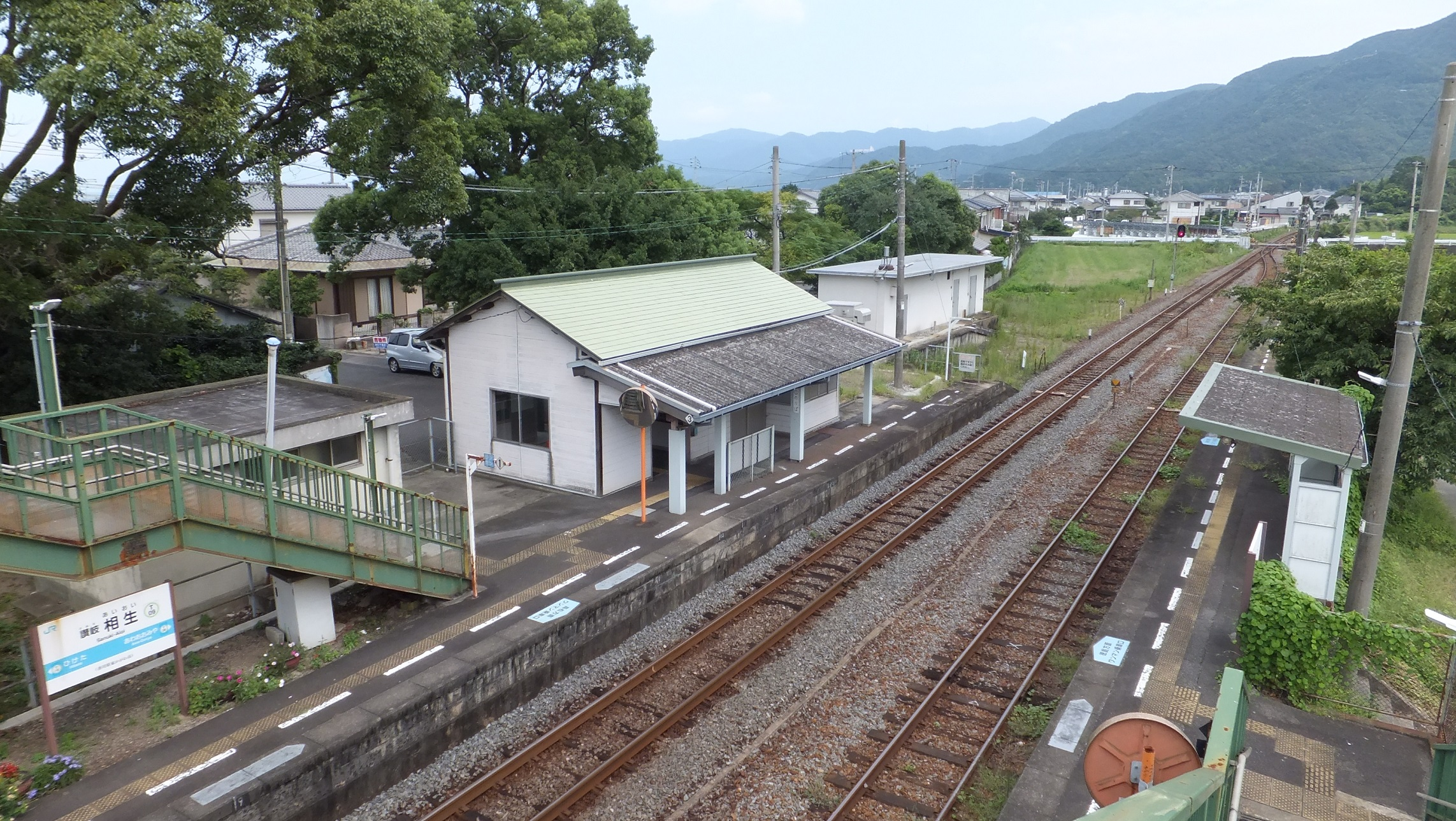
A view of the station platforms and tracks, looking in the direction of Tokushima.

== History ==
Sanuki-Aioi Station was opened on 20 March 1935 as an intermediate stop when the Kōtoku Line was extended eastwards from Hiketa to link up with an existing track at Itano to establish a through-service to Sako. At that time the station was operated by Japanese Government Railways, later becoming Japanese National Railways (JNR). With the privatization of JNR on 1 April 1987, control of the station passed to JR Shikoku.

== Surrounding area ==
- Sakamoto Beach
- Osaka Pass

== See also ==
- List of railway stations in Japan
