= Sanuki-Shirotori Station =

Passenger railway station in Higashikagawa, Kagawa Prefecture, Japan

T11 Sanuki-Shirotori Station 讃岐白鳥駅
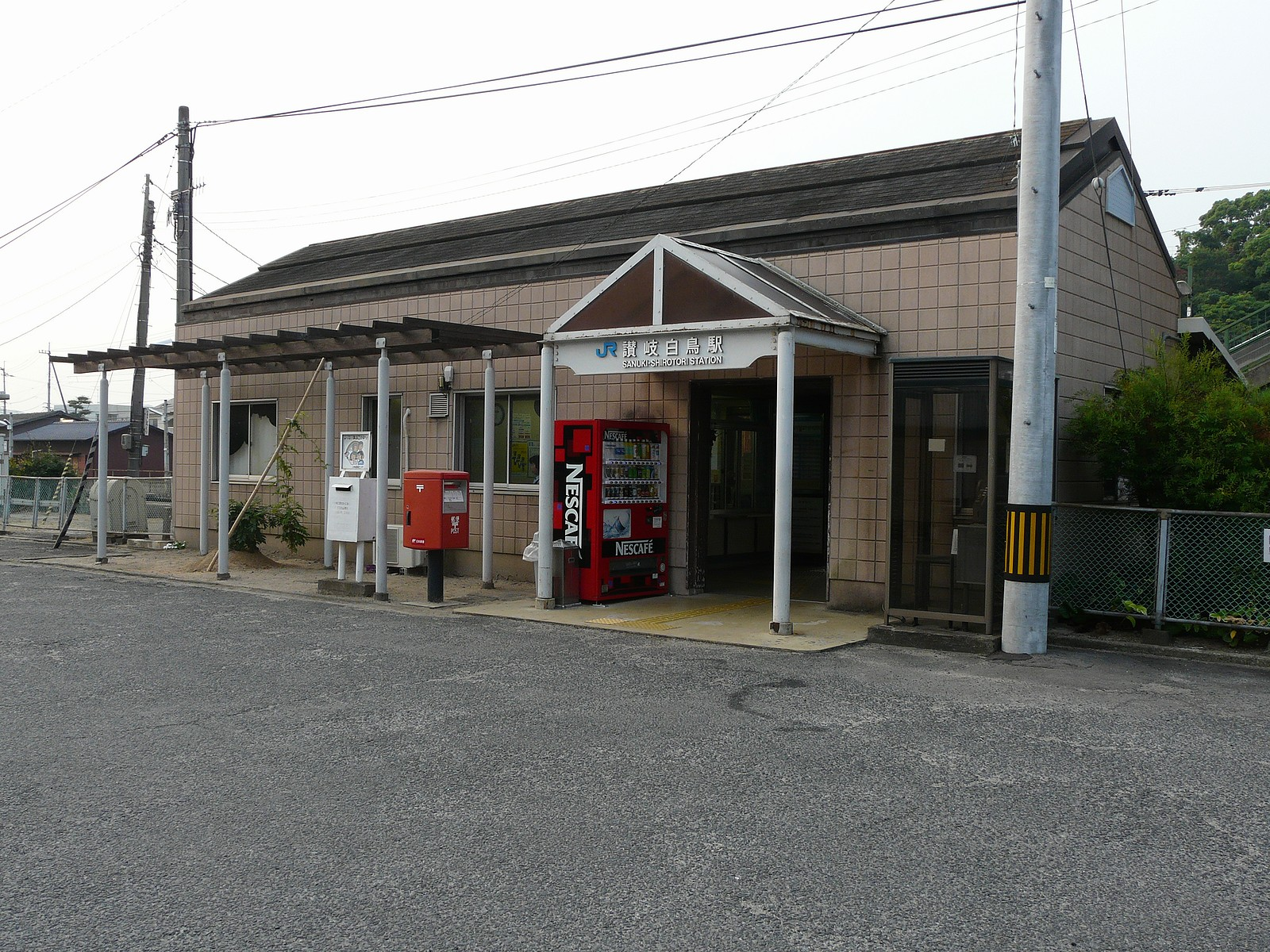
- Sanuki-Shirotori Station, July 2007

General information
- Location: 648-2 Matsubara, Higashikagawa City, Kagawa Prefecture 769-2702; Japan
- Coordinates: 34°14′36″N 134°21′56″E
- Operator: JR Shikoku
- Line: Kōtoku Line
- Distance: 40.7 km (25.3 mi) from Takamatsu
- Platforms: 2 side platforms
- Tracks: 2

Construction
- Structure type: At grade
- Accessible: Yes - platforms have their own entrances from their access roads

Other information
- Status: Unstaffed
- Station code: T11

History
- Opened: 15 April 1928; 98 years ago
- Former names: Sanuki-Shiratori (until 15 December 1956)

Passengers
- FY2019: 440

Services
Preceding station	JR Shikoku	Following station
Sambommatsu T12 towards Takamatsu	Kōtoku Line	Hiketa T10 towards Tokushima
Limited Express
Sambommatsu T12 towards Kojima	Uzushio	Hiketa T10 towards Tokushima
Location
- Location within Kagawa Prefecture Location within Japan

Sanuki-Shirotori Station (讃岐白鳥駅, Sanuki-Shirotori-eki) is a passenger railway station located in the city of Higashikagawa, Kagawa Prefecture, Japan. It is operated by JR Shikoku and has the station number "T11".

== Lines ==
Sanuki-Shirotori Station is served by the JR Shikoku Kōtoku Line and is located 40.7 km from the beginning of the line at Takamatsu. Besides local services, the Uzushio limited express between Okayama, Takamatsu and Tokushima also stops at the station.

== Layout ==
The station consists of two opposed side platforms serving two tracks. The station building is unstaffed and serves only as a waiting room. The platforms are linked by a footbridge but it is also possible to access platform 2 directly from the south entrance of the station. A bike shed is provided just outside this entrance.

== History ==
Sanuki-Shirotori Station was opened on 15 April 1928 as an intermediate stop when the track of the Kōtoku Line was extended eastwards to Hiketa from Sanuki-Tsuda. At that time the station was operated by Japanese Government Railways, later becoming Japanese National Railways (JNR). On 15 December 1956, the reading of the station name was changed from "Sanuki-Shiratori" to "Sanuki-Shirotori" with no change in the kanji. With the privatization of JNR on 1 April 1987, control of the station passed to JR Shikoku.

== Surrounding area ==
- Higashikagawa City Hall
- Kagawa Prefectural Shiratori Hospital

== See also ==
- List of railway stations in Japan
