= Itano Station =

Railway station in Itano, Tokushima prefecture, Japan

T07 Itano Station 板野駅
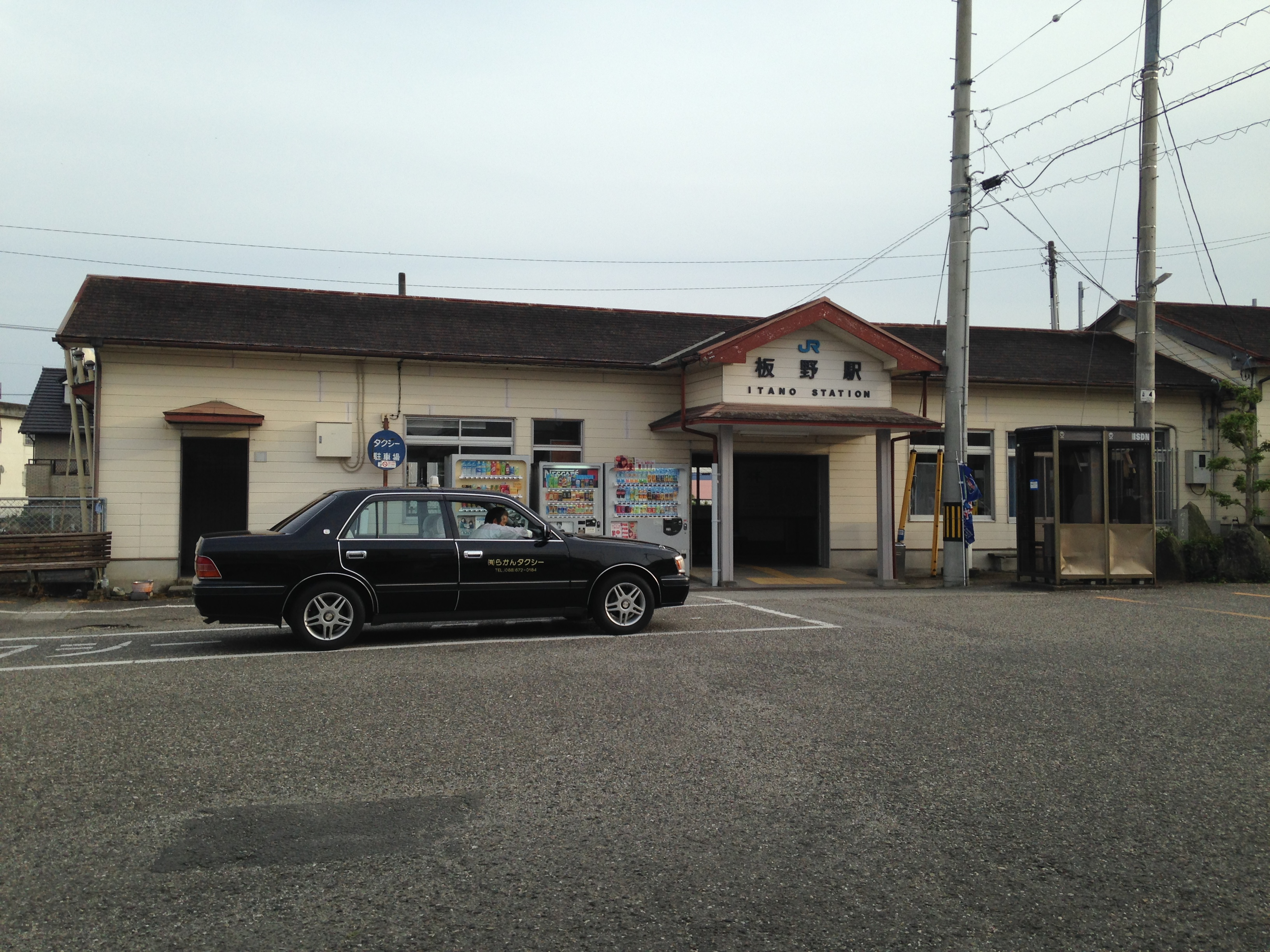
- Itano Station in May 2016

General information
- Location: Hirata-64 Ōtera, Itano Town, Itano District, Tokushima Prefecture 779-0105; Japan
- Coordinates: 34°08′31″N 134°27′56″E
- Operator: JR Shikoku
- Line: Kōtoku Line
- Distance: 58 km (36 mi) from Takamatsu
- Platforms: 1 side + 1 island platform
- Tracks: 3 + 1 passing loop

Construction
- Structure type: At grade
- Parking: Available
- Accessible: Yes - platforms accessed by footbridge but there is also a level crossing

Other information
- Status: Staffed - JR ticket window
- Station code: T07
- Website: Official website

History
- Opened: 15 February 1923; 103 years ago
- Former names: Awa-Ōdera (until 1 July 1933); Banzai (until 10 April 1956)

Passengers
- FY2019: 936

Services
Preceding station	JR Shikoku	Following station
Awa-Ōmiya T08 towards Takamatsu	Kōtoku Line	Awa-Kawabata T06 towards Tokushima
Limited Express
Hiketa T10 towards Kojima	Uzushio	Ikenotani T04 towards Tokushima
Location
- Location within Tokushima Prefecture Location within Japan

Itano Station (板野駅, Itano-eki) is a passenger railway station located in the town of Itano, Itano District, Tokushima Prefecture, Japan. It is operated by JR Shikoku and has the station number "T07".

== Lines ==
Itano Station is served by the JR Shikoku Kōtoku Line and is located 58.0 km from the beginning of the line at Takamatsu. Besides local services, the Uzushio limited express between Okayama, Takamatsu and Tokushima also stops at the station.

== Layout ==
The station consists of an island platform and a side platform serving three tracks. The island platform has an old style tiled roof shelter and serves lines 1 and 2. Line 3 is served by the side platform which has a passing loop/siding running on the other side. The station building is located to the side of line 1. A footbridge from the station building gives access to the island platform and, beyond, to the side platform but a level crossing is also available. The station building houses a waiting room and a JR ticket window (without a Midori no Madoguchi facility). Parking is available at the station forecourt.

=== Platforms ===
1, 2, 3	Kōtoku Line	for Tokushima and Anan
2, 3	Kōtoku Line	for Sambommatsu and Takamatsu

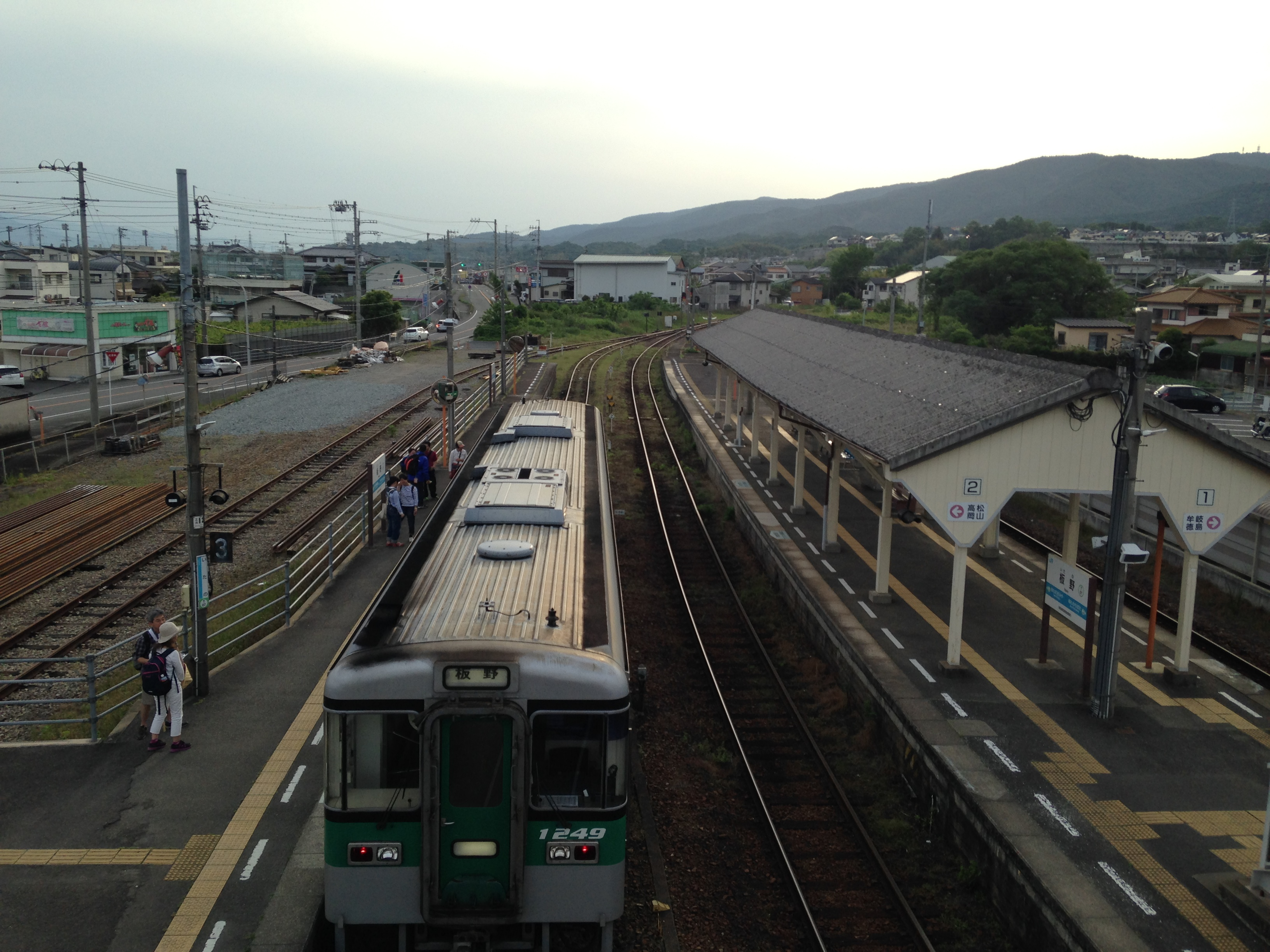
A view of the platforms looking in the direction of Takamatsu. The passing loop can be seen to the left of the side platform. Further to the left of it can be seen the traces of the trackbed of the former track to Kajiyabara.

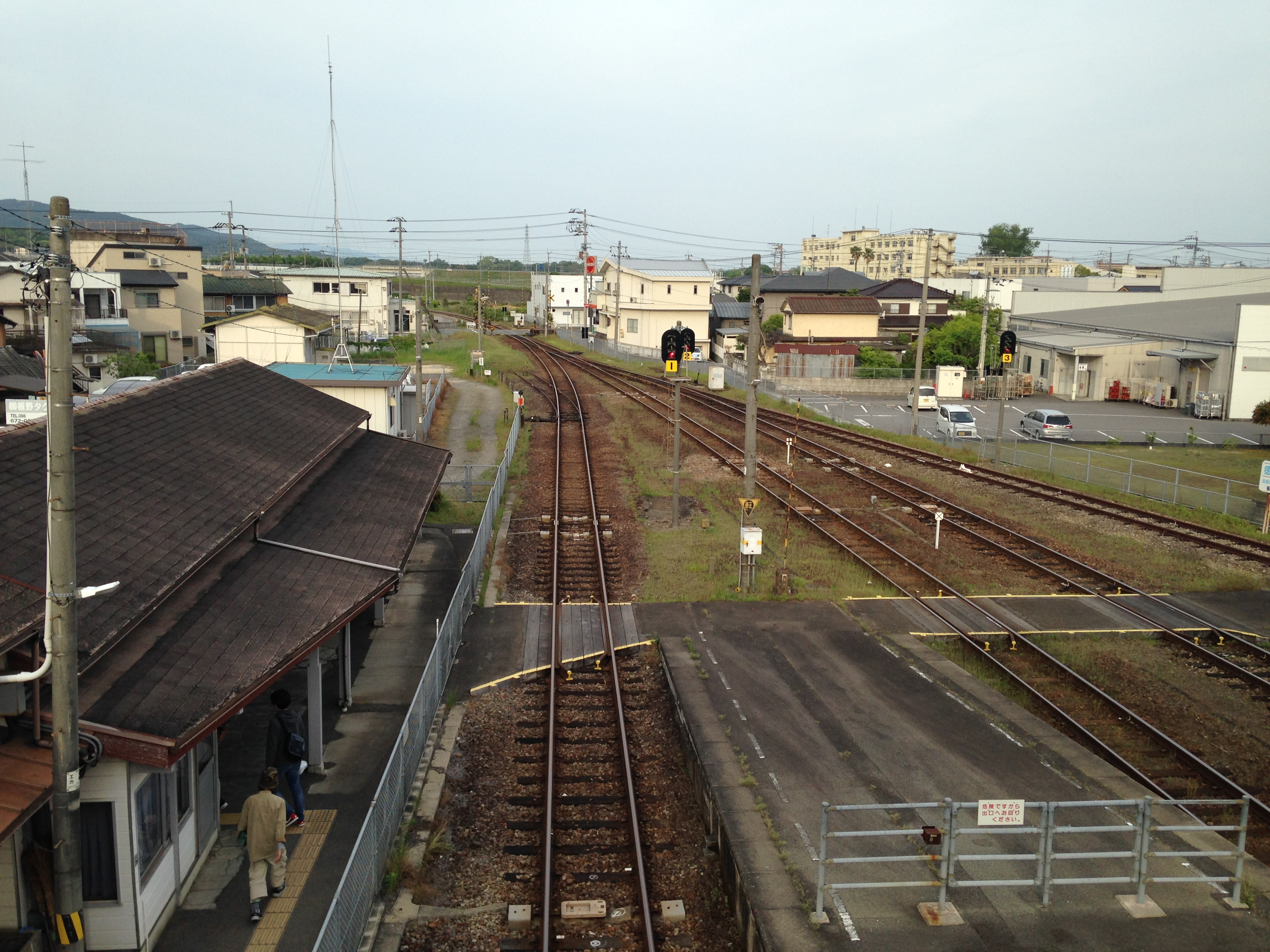
A view from the island platform. There is a level crossing connecting the station building (left) to the island platform and, beyond, to the side platform.

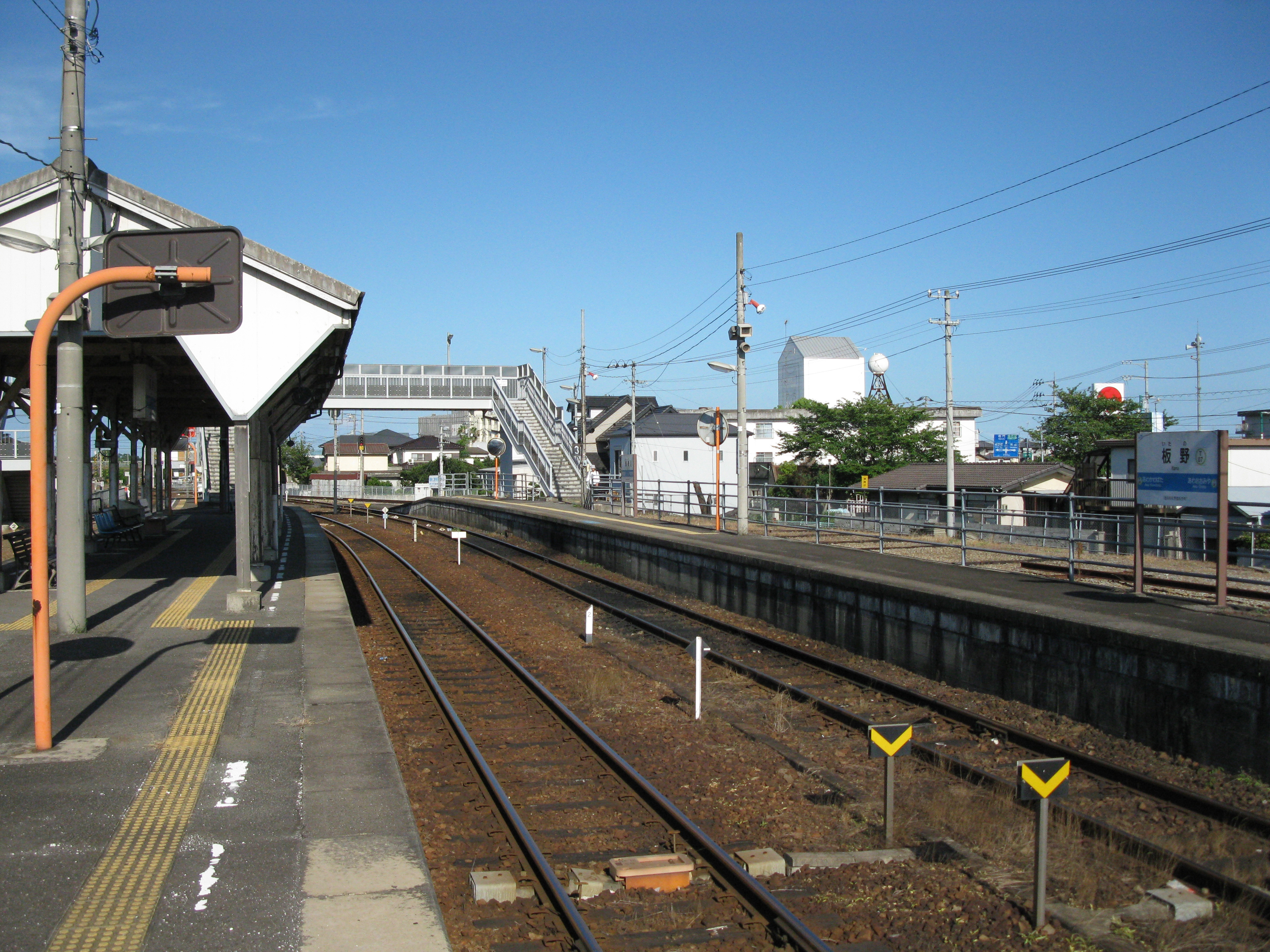

== History ==
Itano Station was opened 15 February 1923 under the name Awa-Ōdera Station (阿波大寺駅) by the privately run Awa Electric Railway (later the Awa Railway). It was an intermediate station on a new stretch of track laid down by the company from Ikenotani to Kajiyabara (now closed). The Awa Railway was nationalized on 1 July 1933 and Japanese Government Railways (JGR) took over control of the station. The station was renamed Banzai Station (板西駅) and was operated as part of the Awa Line from Ikenotani to Banzai to Kajiyabara. On 20 March 1935 Banzai Station became part of the Kōtoku Main Line with through traffic from Takamatsu to Sako. The track to Kajiyabara became part of the Kajiyabara Line with Banzai as the start point. The Kajiyabara Line was closed from 1 November 1943 to 15 July 1947 and on 10 April 1956 the station was renamed Itano Station. On 16 January 1972 the Kajiyabara Line was closed and the station was then served solely by the Kōtoku Main Line. On 1 April 1987:JNR (the successor to JGR) was privatized. JR Shikoku assumed control of the station. On 1 June 1988 the Kōtoku Main Line was renamed the Kōtoku Line.

== Passenger statistics ==
In fiscal 2018, the station was used by an average of 936 passengers daily

== Surrounding area ==
- Itano Town Hall
- Itano Municipal Itano Junior High School
- Tokushima Prefectural Itano High School

== See also ==
- List of railway stations in Japan
