= Furutakamatsu-Minami Station =

Passenger railway station in Takamatsu, Kagawa Prefecture, Japan

T22 Furutakamatsu-Minami Station 古高松南駅
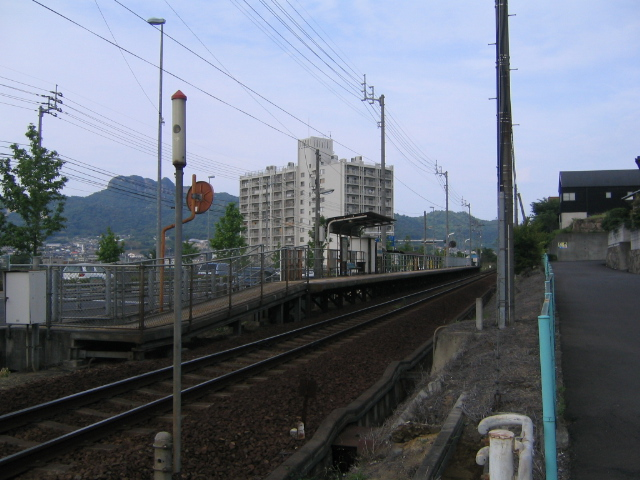
- Furutakamatsu-Minami Station

General information
- Location: 2029-5 Tsunomura, Takamatsu-cho, Takamatsu City, Kagawa Prefecture 761-0104; Japan
- Coordinates: 34°20′28″N 134°07′18″E
- Operator: JR Shikoku
- Line: Kōtoku Line
- Distance: 10.8 km (6.7 mi) from Takamatsu
- Platforms: 1 side platform
- Tracks: 1

Construction
- Structure type: At grade
- Cycle facilities: Bike shed
- Accessible: Yes - ramp leads up to platform

Other information
- Status: Unstaffed
- Station code: T22

History
- Opened: 1 November 1986; 39 years ago

Passengers
- FY2019: 486

Services
Preceding station	JR Shikoku	Following station
Yashima T23 towards Takamatsu	Kōtoku Line	Yakuriguchi T21 towards Tokushima
Uzushio does not stop here
Location
- Location within Kagawa Prefecture Location within Japan

Furutakamatsu-Minami Station (古高松南駅, Furutakamatsu-Minami-eki) is a passenger railway station located in the city of Takamatsu, Kagawa Prefecture, Japan. It is operated by JR Shikoku and has the station number "T22".

== Lines ==
The station is served by the JR Shikoku Kōtoku Line and is located 10.8 km from the beginning of the line at Takamatsu. Only local services stop at the station.

== Layout ==
The station consists of a side platform serving a single track. There is no station building and the station is unstaffed but a shelter is provided on the platform for waiting passengers and a "Tickets Corner" (a small shelter housing an automatic ticket vending machine) is installed. A ramp leads up to the platform from the access road. A bike shed is near the station entrance.

== History ==
Japanese National Railways (JNR) opened Furutakamatsu-Minami Station on 1 November 1986 as a temporary stop on the existing Kōtoku Line. With the privatization of JNR on 1 April 1987, JR Shikoku assumed control and the stop was upgraded to a full station.

== Surrounding area ==
- Hirata Pond
- Yakuri Station on the Takamatsu Kotohira Electric Railway Shido Line

== See also ==
- List of railway stations in Japan
