= Sanuki-Tsuda Station =

Passenger railway station in Sanuki, Kagawa Prefecture, Japan

T15 Sanuki-Tsuda Station 讃岐津田駅
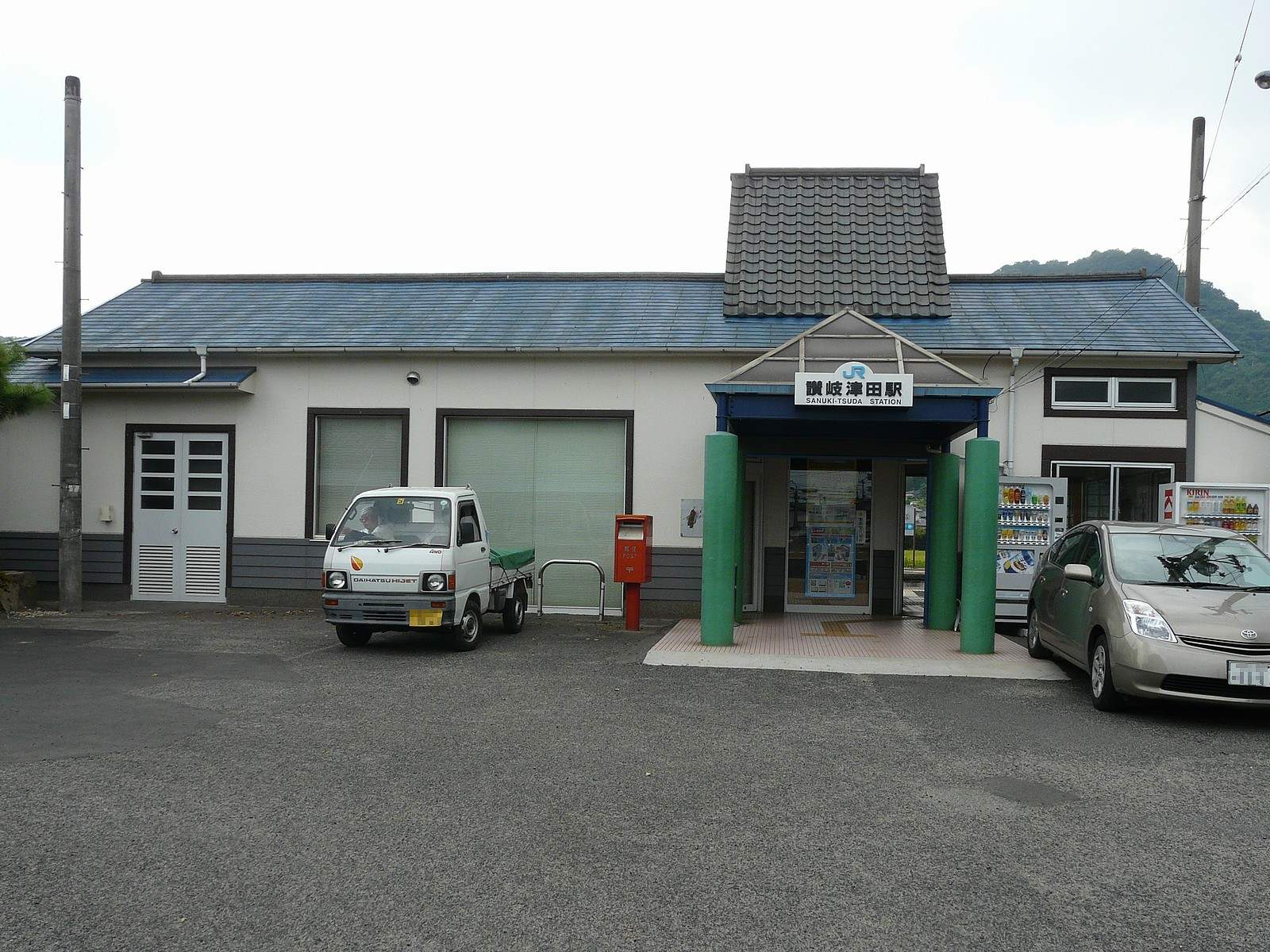
- Sanuki-Tsuda Station, July 2007

General information
- Location: 887 Tsudamachi Tsuda, Sanuki City, Kagawa Prefecture 769-2401; Japan
- Coordinates: 34°17′18″N 134°14′53″E
- Operator: JR Shikoku
- Line: Kōtoku Line
- Distance: 27.7 km (17.2 mi) from Takamatsu
- Platforms: 1 side + 1 island platform
- Tracks: 3 + 1 siding

Construction
- Structure type: At grade
- Accessible: No - platforms linked by footbridge

Other information
- Status: Staffed (JR Shikoku ticket window)
- Station code: T15

History
- Opened: 21 March 1926; 100 years ago

Passengers
- FY2019: 1,066

Services
Preceding station	JR Shikoku	Following station
Kanzaki T16 towards Takamatsu	Kōtoku Line	Tsuruwa T14 towards Tokushima
Limited Express
Orange Town T18 towards Kojima	Uzushio	Sambommatsu T12 towards Tokushima
Location
- Location within Kagawa Prefecture Location within Japan

Sanuki-Tsuda Station (讃岐津田駅, Sanuki-Tsuda-eki) is passenger railway station located in the city of Sanuki, Kagawa Prefecture, Japan. It is operated by JR Shikoku and has the station number "T15".

== Lines ==
The station is served by the JR Shikoku Kōtoku Line and is located 27.7 km from the beginning of the line at Takamatsu. Besides local services, the Uzushio limited express between Okayama, Takamatsu and Tokushima also stops at the station.

== Layout ==
Sanuki-Tsuda Station consists of a side platform and an island platform serving three tracks. The station building is unstaffed and serves only as a waiting room. Access to the island platform is by means of a footbridge. There is a siding which branches off track 1 and ends in a vehicle shed near the station building.

== History ==
Sanuki-Tsuda Station was opened on 21 March 1926 as the terminus of the Kōtoku Line when the track was extended eastwards from Shido. It became a through-station on 15 April 1928 when the track was further extended to Hiketa. At that time the station was operated by Japanese Government Railways, later becoming Japanese National Railways (JNR). With the privatization of JNR on 1 April 1987, control of the station passed to JR Shikoku.

== Surrounding area ==
- Kagawa Prefecture Okawa Joint Government Building
- Kagawa Prefectural Tosan Agricultural Improvement and Extension Center
- Sanuki Municipal Tsuda Children's Center
- Sanuki Municipal Tsuda Elementary School

== See also ==
- List of railway stations in Japan
