= Aioi Station =

Aioi Station is the name of four train stations in Japan:

- Aioi Station (Gifu) (相生駅) in Gifu Prefecture
- Aioi Station (Gunma) (相老駅) in Gunma Prefecture
- Aioi Station (Hyogo) (相生駅) in Hyogo Prefecture
- Sanuki-Aioi Station (讃岐相生駅) in Kagawa Prefecture
