= Hiketa Station =

Railway station in Higashikagawa, Kagawa prefecture, Japan

T10 Hiketa Station 引田駅
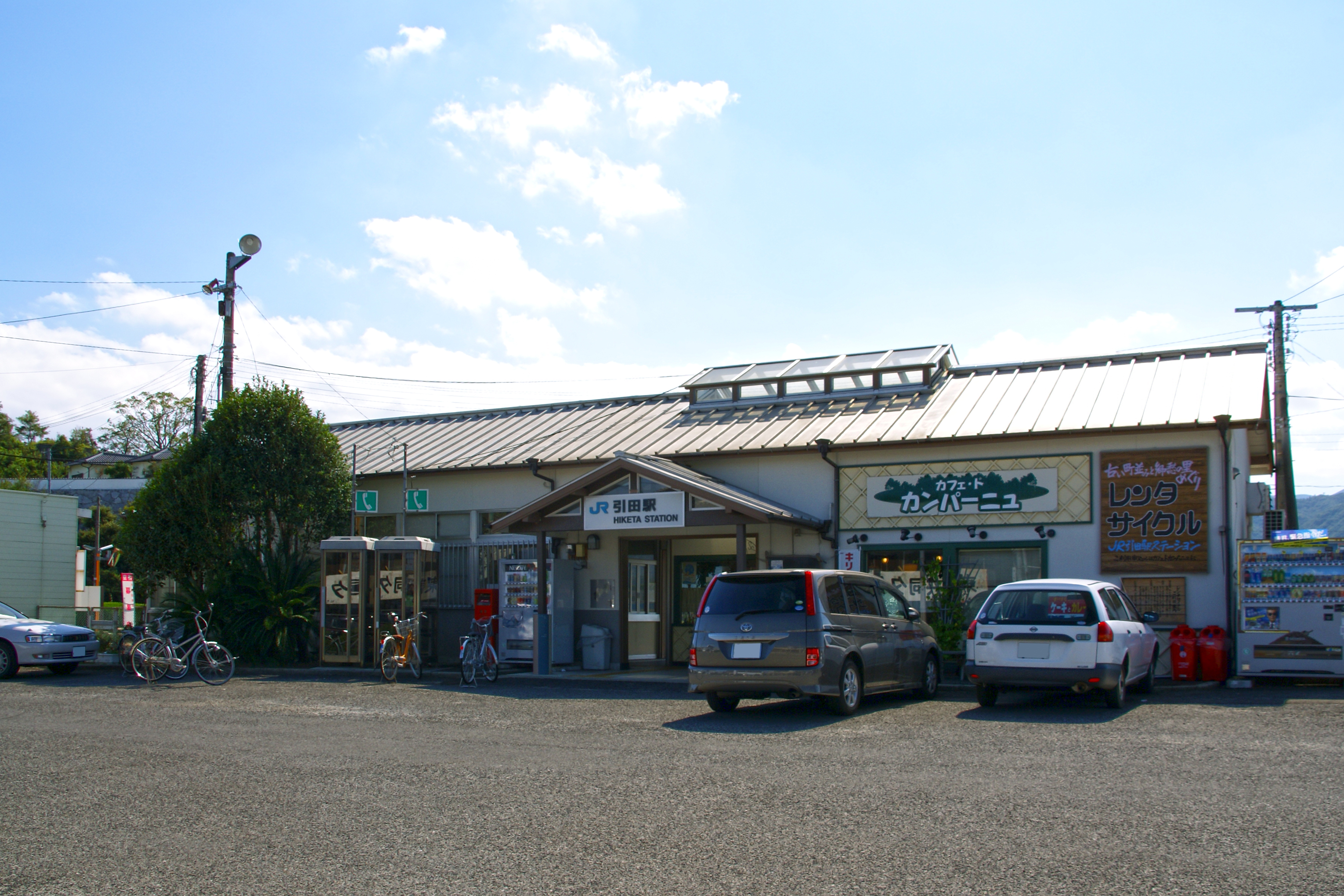
- Hiketa Station in 2007

General information
- Location: 700-2 Hiketa, Higashikagawa City, Kagawa Prefecture 769-2901; Japan
- Coordinates: 34°13′25″N 134°24′04″E
- Operator: JR Shikoku
- Line: Kōtoku Line
- Distance: 45.1 km (28.0 mi) from Takamatsu
- Platforms: 1 side + 1 island platform
- Tracks: 2 + 2 sidings

Construction
- Structure type: At grade
- Parking: Available
- Accessible: No - platforms linked by footbridge

Other information
- Status: Staffed - JR ticket window
- Station code: T10

History
- Opened: 15 April 1928; 98 years ago

Passengers
- FY2019: 516

Services
Preceding station	JR Shikoku	Following station
Sanuki-Shirotori T11 towards Takamatsu	Kōtoku Line	Sanuki-Aioi T09 towards Tokushima
Limited Express
Sanuki-Shirotori T11 towards Kojima	Uzushio	Itano T07 towards Tokushima
Location
- Location within Kagawa Prefecture Location within Japan

Hiketa Station (引田駅, Hiketa-eki) is a passenger railway station located in the city of Higashikagawa, Kagawa Prefecture, Japan. It is operated by JR Shikoku and has the station number "T10".

== Lines ==
Hiketa Station is served by the JR Shikoku Kōtoku Line and is located 45.1 km from the beginning of the line at Takamatsu. Besides local services, the Uzushio limited express between Okayama, Takamatsu and Tokushima also stops at the station.

== Layout ==
The station consists of a side platform and an island platform serving three tracks. A station building houses a waiting room and a cafe. A JR ticket window (without a Midori no Madoguchi facility) is available but open for limited hours only. Access to the island platform is by means of a footbridge. A siding runs on the far side of the island platform beyond track 3. Another siding branches off track 1 and ends at a disused freight platform. Parking is available on the station forecourt.

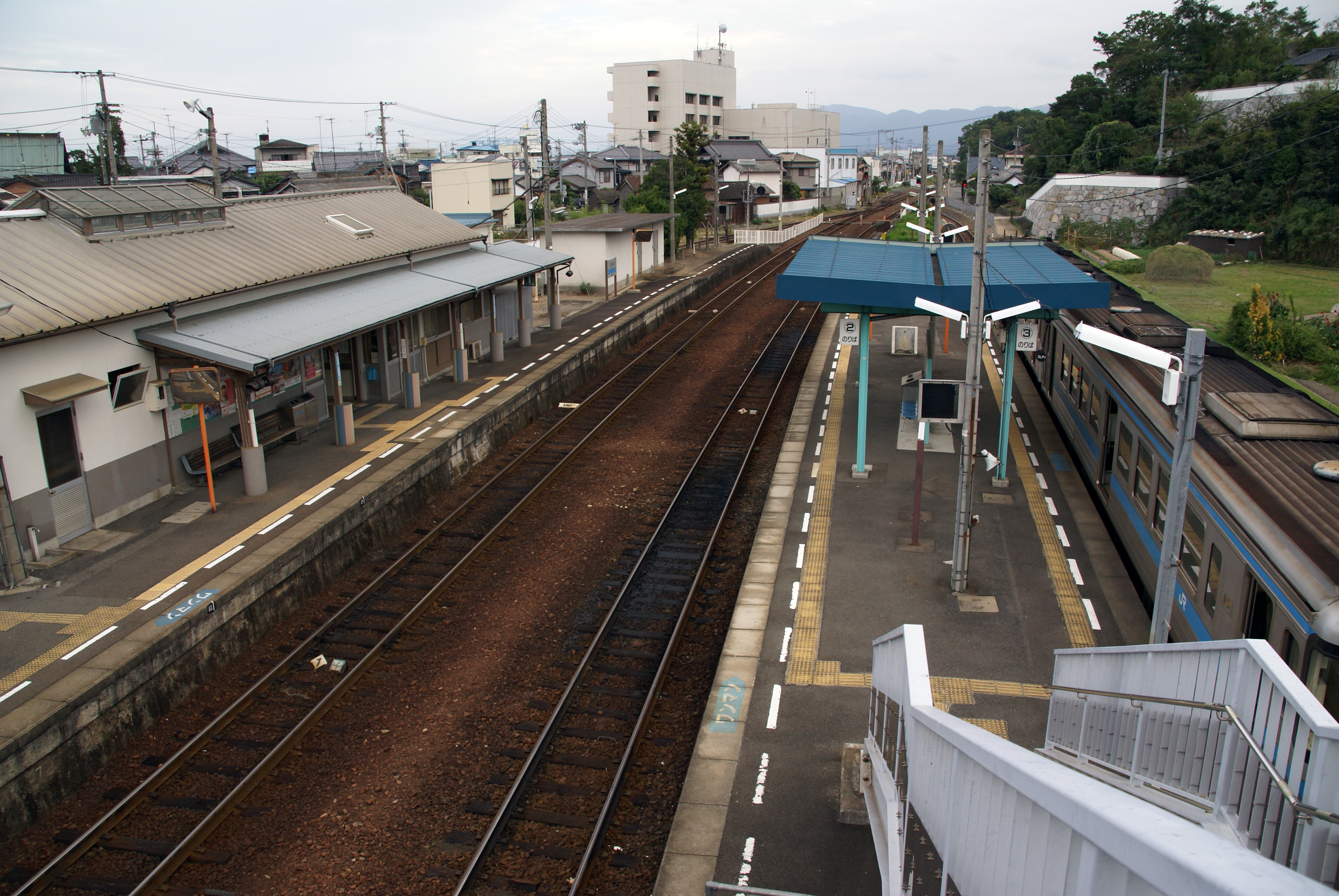
A view of the station platforms and tracks, looking in the direction of Tokushima. In the far distance, a siding can be seen branching off track 1 to the left.

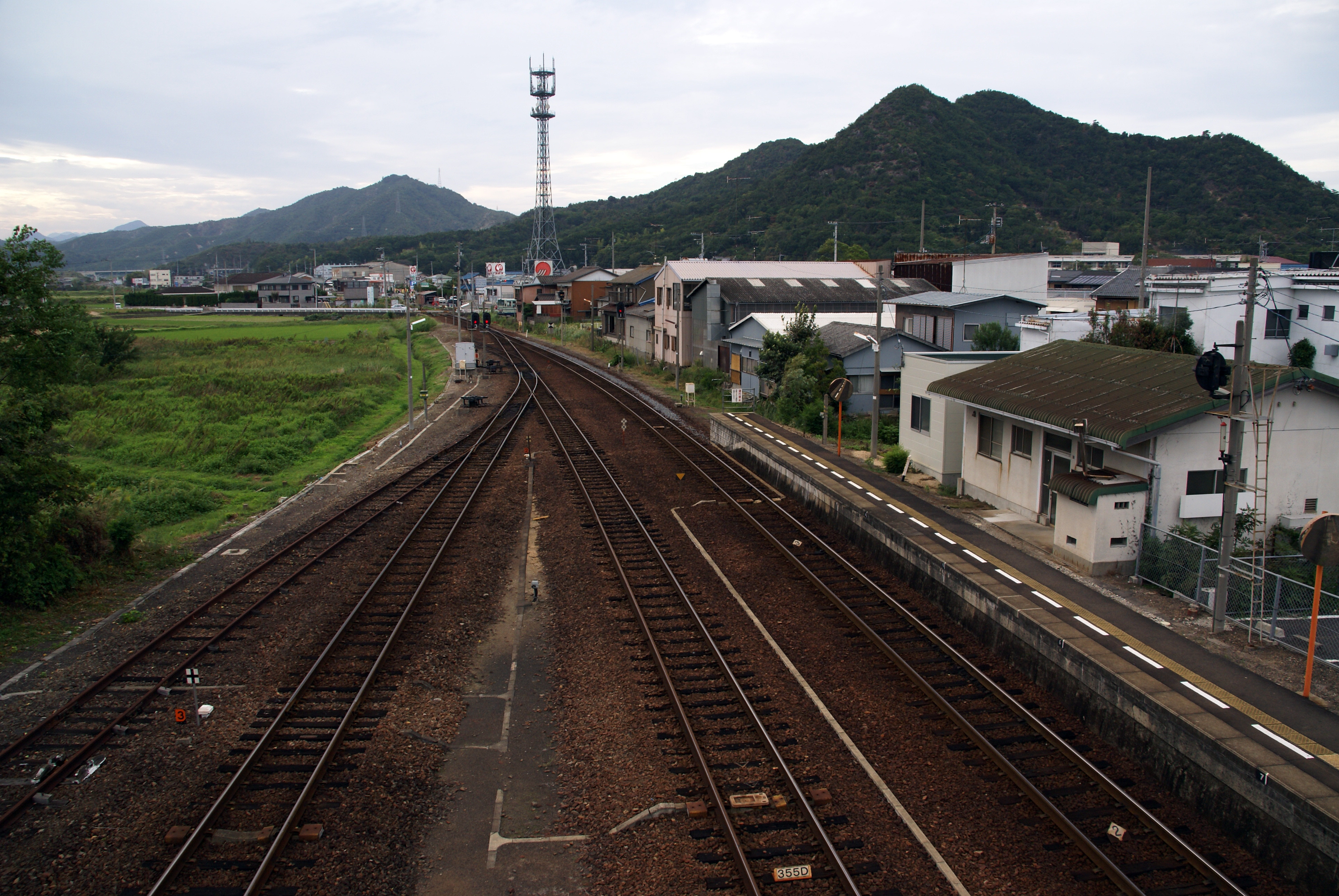
The station tracks in the direction of Takamatsu. The siding branching off track 3 can be seen to the left.

== History ==
Hiketa Station was opened on 15 April 1928 as the terminus of the Kōtoku Line when the track was extended eastwards from Sanuki-Tsuda. It became a through station on 20 March 1935 when the line was extended further east to link up with other tracks to establish a through-service to Sako. At that time the station was operated by Japanese Government Railways, later becoming Japanese National Railways (JNR). With the privatization of JNR on 1 April 1987, control of the station passed to JR Shikoku.

== Surrounding area ==
- Hiketa Historical Preservation Area
- Higashikagawa City Hiketa Office
- Higashikagawa Municipal Hiketa Elementary School

== See also ==
- List of railway stations in Japan
