= Sambommatsu Station (Kagawa) =

Passenger railway station in Higashikagawa, Kagawa Prefecture, Japan

T12 Sambommatsu Station 三本松駅
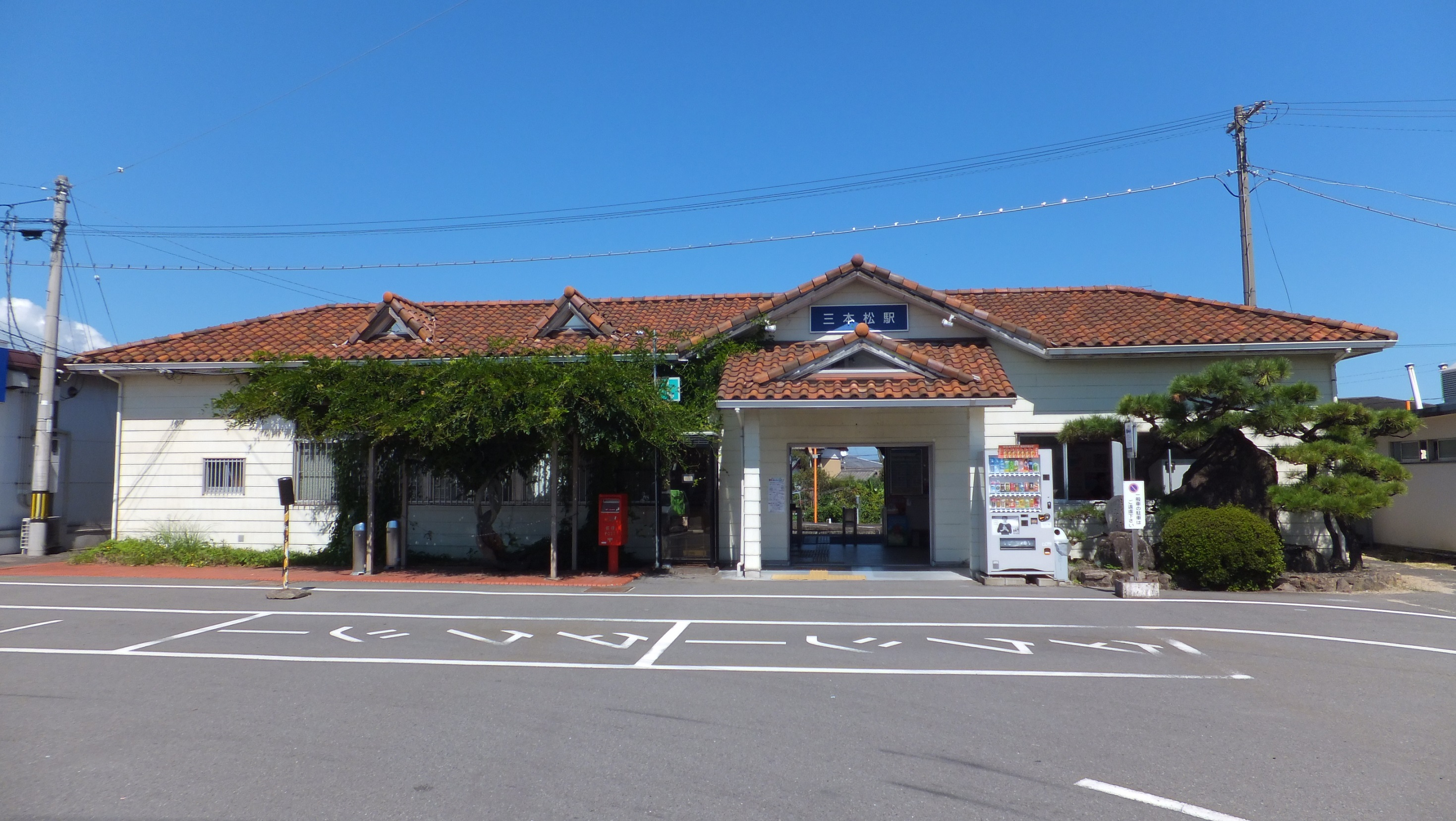
- Sambommatsu Station in 2015

General information
- Location: 1152-3 Sanbonmatsu, Higashikagawa City, Kagawa Prefecture 769-2601; Japan
- Coordinates: 34°15′06″N 134°20′04″E
- Operator: JR Shikoku
- Line: Kōtoku Line
- Distance: 37.6 km (23.4 mi) from Takamatsu
- Platforms: 1 side + 1 island platform
- Tracks: 3 + 1 passing siding

Construction
- Structure type: At grade
- Parking: Available
- Cycle facilities: Bike shed
- Accessible: No - platforms linked by footbridge

Other information
- Status: Staffed - JR ticket window (Midori no Madoguchi)
- Station code: T12
- Website: Official website

History
- Opened: 15 April 1928; 98 years ago

Passengers
- FY2019: 1472

Services
Preceding station	JR Shikoku	Following station
Nibu T13 towards Takamatsu	Kōtoku Line	Sanuki-Shirotori T11 towards Tokushima
Limited Express
Sanuki-Tsuda T15 towards Kojima	Uzushio	Sanuki-Shirotori T11 towards Tokushima
Location
- Location within Kagawa Prefecture Location within Japan

Sambommatsu Station (三本松駅, Sambommatsu-eki) is a passenger railway station located in the city of Higashikagawa, Kagawa Prefecture, Japan. It is operated by JR Shikoku and has the station number "T12".

== Lines ==
Sambommatsu Station is served by the JR Shikoku Kōtoku Line and is located 37.6 km from the beginning of the line at Takamatsu. Besides local services, the Uzushio limited express between Okayama, Takamatsu and Tokushima also stops at the station.

== Layout ==
The station consists of a side platform and an island platform serving three tracks. A station building houses a waiting room and a JR ticket window (with a Midori no Madoguchi facility). Access to the island platform is by means of a footbridge. A siding runs on the far side of the island platform beyond track 3. Parking is available on the station forecourt and a large bike shed is provided.

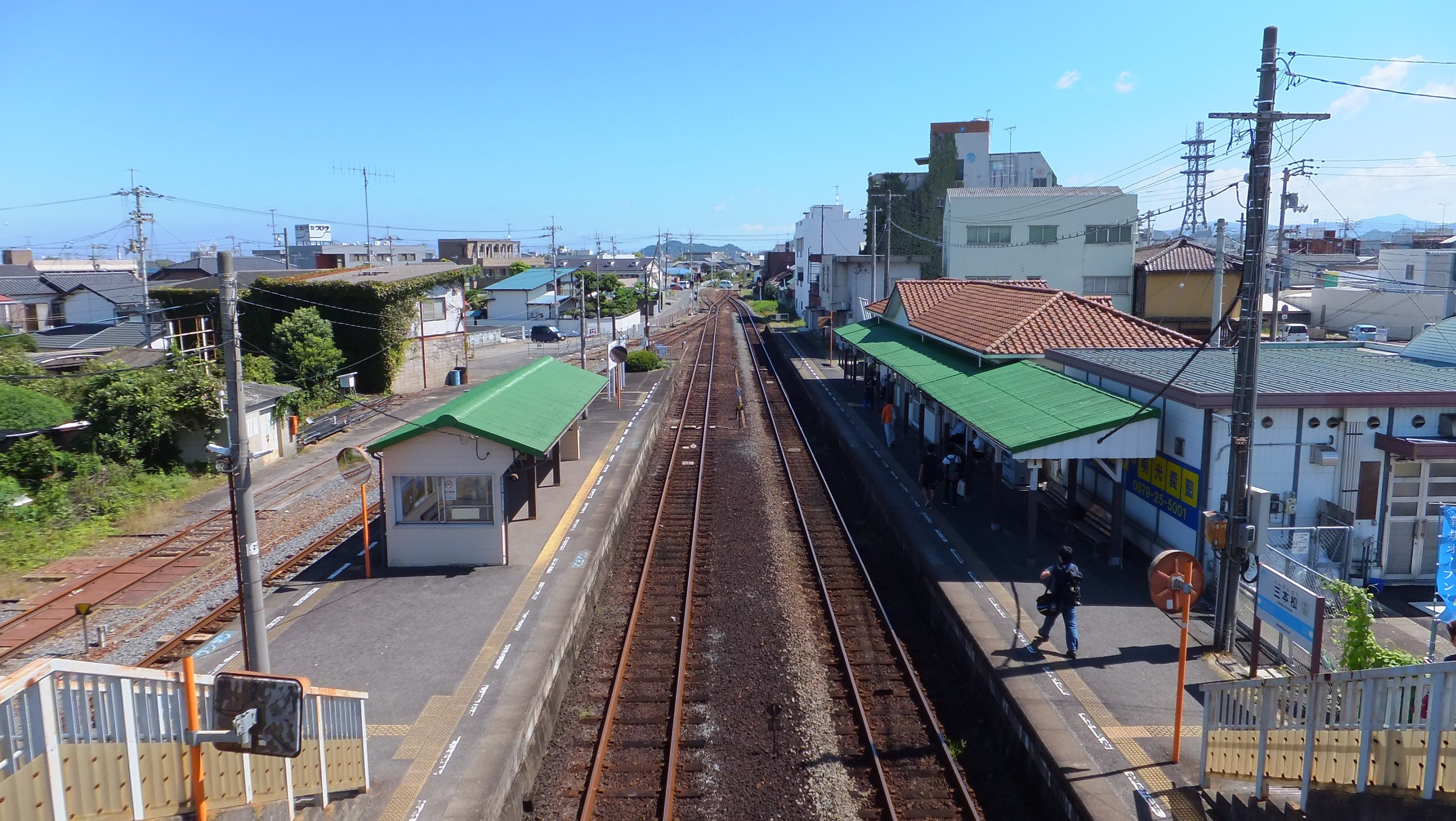
A view of the station platforms and tracks, looking in the direction of Tokushima.

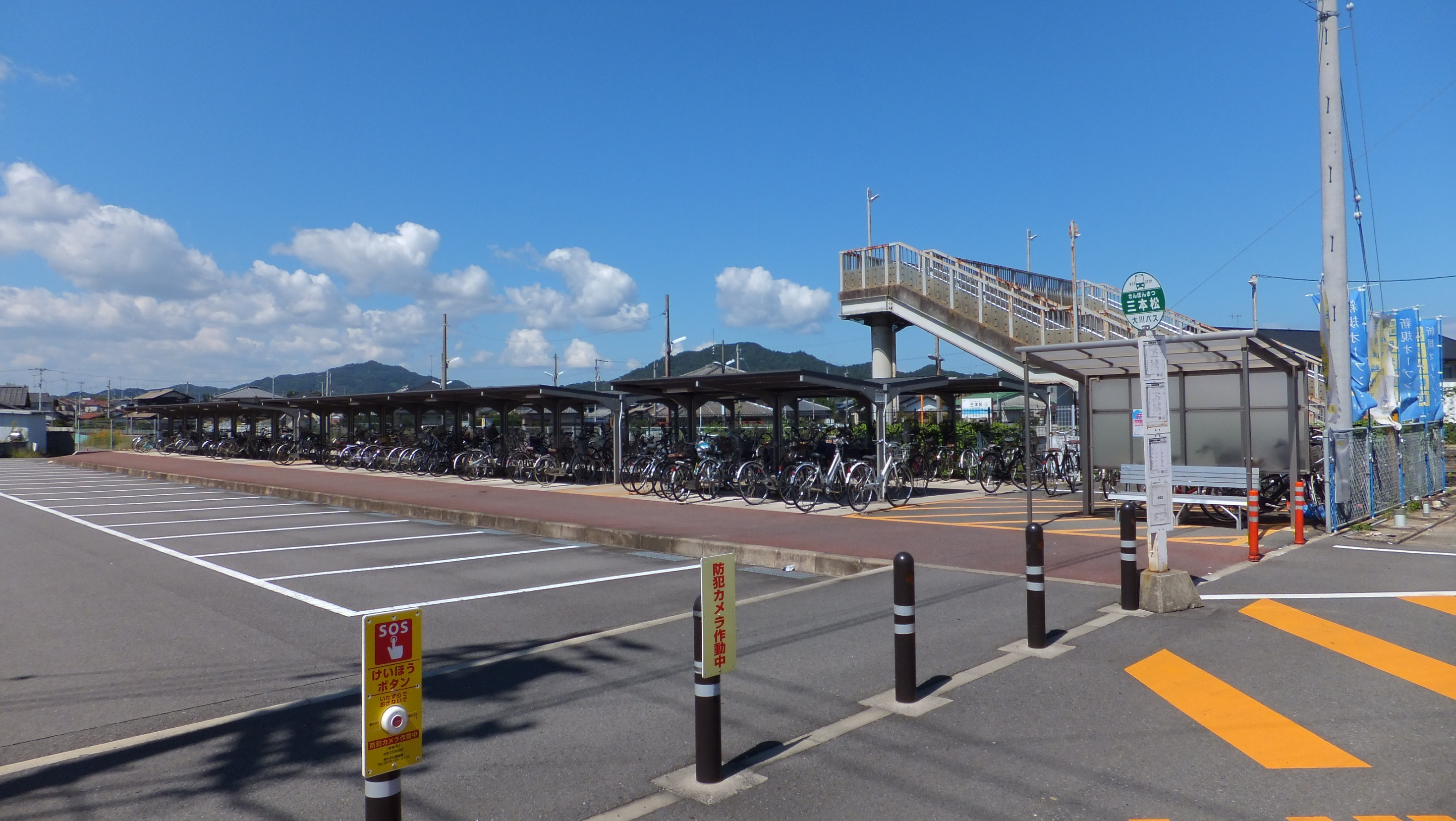
A view of the station forecourt, showing the bike sheds. The station building is outside the frame, to the right.

== History ==
Sambommatsu Station was opened on 15 April 1928 as an intermediate stop when the track of the Kōtoku Line was extended eastwards to Hiketa from Sanuki-Tsuda. At that time the station was operated by Japanese Government Railways, later becoming Japanese National Railways (JNR). With the privatization of JNR on 1 April 1987, control of the station passed to JR Shikoku.

== Surrounding area ==
- Higashikagawa City Hall Ouchi Office (former Ouchi town hall)
- Higashikagawa Municipal Okawa Junior High School
- Kagawa Prefectural Sanbonmatsu High School

== See also ==
- List of railway stations in Japan
