= Kōtoku Line =

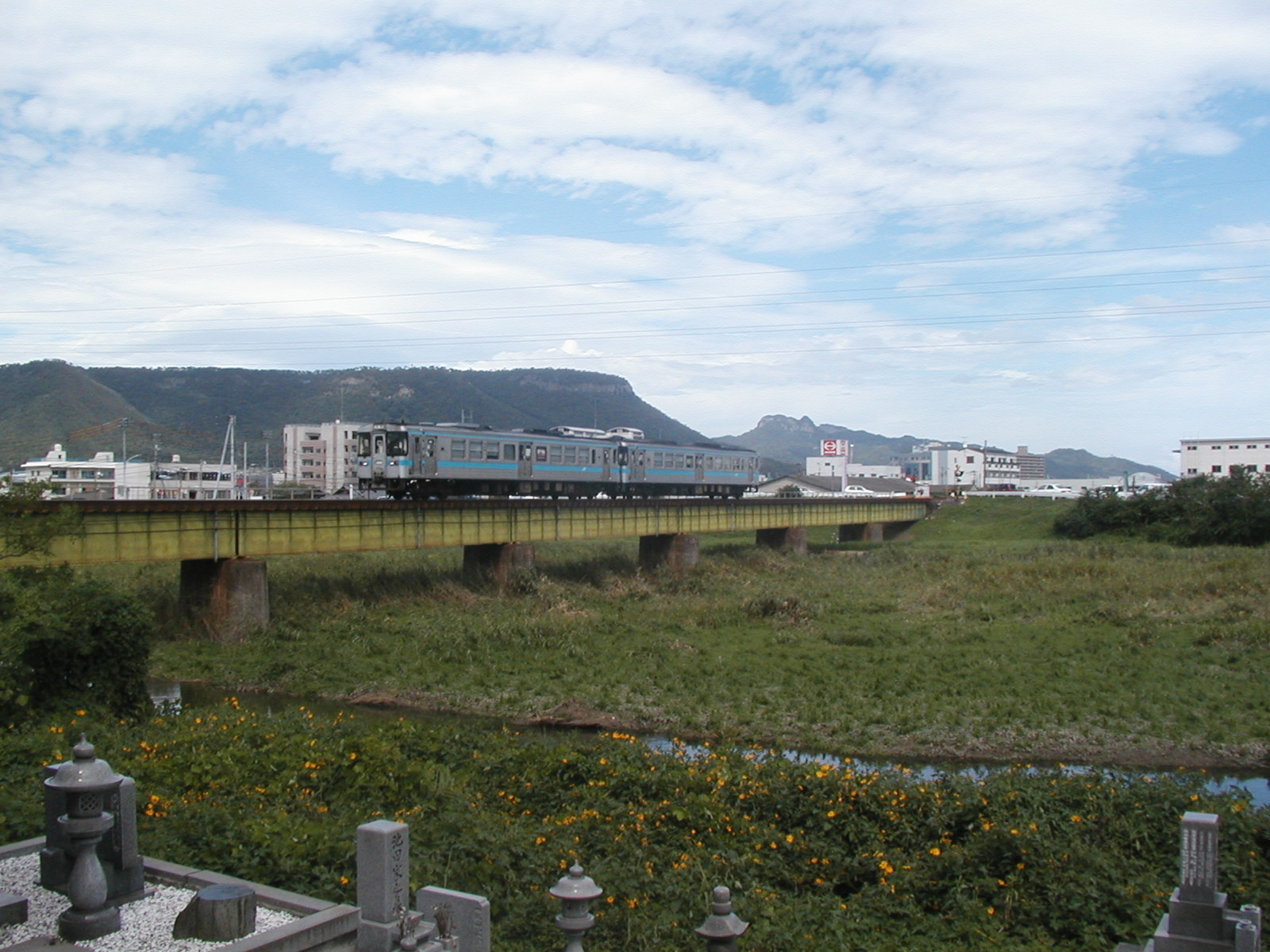
- A local train traveling over the Kasuga River with Yashima in the background

Overview
- Locale: Kagawa, Tokushima prefectures
- Termini: Takamatsu; Tokushima
- Stations: 29

Service
- Type: Heavy rail
- Operator(s): JR Shikoku

History
- Opened: 1899; 127 years ago

Technical
- Line length: 74.5 km (46.3 mi)
- Track gauge: 1,067 mm (3 ft 6 in)
- Electrification: None
- Operating speed: 130 km/h (81 mph)
Route map

The Kōtoku Line (高徳線, Kōtoku-sen) is a railway line in northeastern Shikoku, Japan that connects the prefectural capitals Takamatsu (Kagawa) and Tokushima (Tokushima). Shikoku Railway Company (JR Shikoku) owns and operates the line, whose name comes from the characters in the cities that the line connects: Takamatsu (高松) and Tokushima (徳島).

Sanuki, the name of the ancient province that preceded the modern Kagawa Prefecture, appears in the names of four stations on the line.

== Services ==
The Uzushio limited express serves the entire line. Two round-trips per day run through to/from Okayama.

In addition to local trains that run the entire length of the Kōtoku Line, there are trains that run between Takamatsu and Orange Town, Sambommatsu, and Hiketa, as well as between Tokushima and Itano and Tokushima and Hiketa. For a single-tracked line service levels are quite high, except along the prefectural border between Itano and Hiketa. In Tokushima there are through trains to/from the Naruto and Mugi lines, with one train per day running from Takamatsu to Mugi via Anan.

Since the completion of electrification work between Takamatsu and Iyoshi on the Yosan Line, the Kōtoku Line has received some of the newest DMUs on the JR Shikoku network. Local services often use 1000 series, 1200 series and 1500 series DMUs, while limited express services are handled by N2000 series DMUs.

== Station list ==
- Local trains stop at all stations. For details of the Uzushio limited express service see that article.
- Trains can pass one another at stations marked "◇" and "^" and cannot pass at those marked "｜".

Station No.	Station	Japanese	Distance (km)		Transfers		Location	
Station No.	Station	Japanese	Between stations	Total	Transfers		City/town	Prefecture
T28	Takamatsu	高松	-	0.0	Yosan Line (Y00) (Seto-Ōhashi Line); Kotoden Kotohira Line (Takamatsu-Chikkō)	∨	Takamatsu	Kagawa
T27	Shōwachō	昭和町	1.5	1.5		｜	Takamatsu	Kagawa
T26	Ritsurin-Kōen-Kitaguchi	栗林公園北口	1.7	3.2		｜	Takamatsu	Kagawa
T25	Ritsurin	栗林	1.1	4.3		◇	Takamatsu	Kagawa
T24	Kitachō	木太町	2.4	6.7		｜	Takamatsu	Kagawa
T23	Yashima	屋島	2.8	9.5		◇	Takamatsu	Kagawa
T22	Furutakamatsu-Minami	古高松南	1.3	10.8		｜	Takamatsu	Kagawa
T21	Yakuriguchi	八栗口	1.5	12.3		◇	Takamatsu	Kagawa
T20	Sanuki-Mure	讃岐牟礼	1.1	13.4	Kotoden Shido Line (Yakuri-Shimmichi)	｜	Takamatsu	Kagawa
T19	Shido	志度	2.9	16.3	Kotoden Shido Line (Kotoden-Shido)	◇	Sanuki	Kagawa
T18	Orange Town	オレンジタウン	2.6	18.9		◇	Sanuki	Kagawa
T17	Zōda	造田	2.4	21.3		◇	Sanuki	Kagawa
T16	Kanzaki	神前	2.1	23.4		｜	Sanuki	Kagawa
T15	Sanuki-Tsuda	讃岐津田	4.3	27.7		◇	Sanuki	Kagawa
T14	Tsuruwa	鶴羽	2.7	30.4		◇	Sanuki	Kagawa
T13	Nibu	丹生	4.0	34.4		◇	Higashikagawa	Kagawa
T12	Sambommatsu	三本松	3.2	37.6		◇	Higashikagawa	Kagawa
T11	Sanuki-Shirotori	讃岐白鳥	3.1	40.7		◇	Higashikagawa	Kagawa
T10	Hiketa	引田	4.4	45.1		◇	Higashikagawa	Kagawa
T09	Sanuki-Aioi	讃岐相生	2.5	47.6		◇	Higashikagawa	Kagawa
T08	Awa-Ōmiya	阿波大宮	5.6	53.2		◇	Itano, Itano District	Tokushima
T07	Itano	板野	4.8	58.0		◇	Itano, Itano District	Tokushima
T06	Awa-Kawabata	阿波川端	1.8	59.8		｜	Itano, Itano District	Tokushima
T05	Bandō	板東	2.3	62.1		◇	Naruto	Tokushima
T04	Ikenotani	池谷	2.1	64.2	Naruto Line (N04) (some trains through to Tokushima)	◇	Naruto	Tokushima
T03	Shōzui	勝瑞	2.7	66.9		◇	Aizumi, Itano District	Tokushima
T02	Yoshinari	吉成	1.3	68.2		◇	Tokushima	Tokushima
T01	Sako	佐古	4.9	73.1	Tokushima Line (B01) (All trains through to Tokushima)	◇	Tokushima	Tokushima
T00	Tokushima	徳島	1.4	74.5	Mugi Line (M00)	◇	Tokushima	Tokushima

== History ==
The first part of what is now the Kotoku Line was built by the Tokushima Railway, being the Sako to Tokushima section of its line from Kamojima (now the Tokushima Line) opened on February 16, 1899. That company was nationalised in 1907. In 1916 the Awa Electric Railway opened a line from Nakahara to Naruto, including the Yoshinari to Ikenotani section, which is now part of the Kotoku Line. The Takamatsu to Hikida section was opened between 1925 and 1928 by the (then) Japanese Imperial Railways.

In 1933 the Awa Electric Railway was nationalised, and in 1935 the Hikida to Ikenotani and Yoshinari to Sako sections were opened, completing the line.

In 1977 CTC signalling became operational for the line, and freight operations ceased in 1986.

With the privatization of JNR, the line became part of the Shikoku Railway Company (JR Shikoku) on April 1, 1987. On June 1, 1988, the line name changed from Kōtoku Main Line to Kōtoku Line.

The elevated Sako Station was commissioned in 1993, and in 1998 track improvement allowing faster speeds was completed, and Orange Town Station opened.

=== Former connecting lines ===
- Itano Station: The Awa Electric Railway opened a 7 km line to Kajiyabara in 1923, it being taken over by the Japanese Imperial Railways when the company was nationalised in 1933. The line closed in 1972.

== See also ==
- List of railway lines in Japan
