= Higashikagawa =

City in Kagawa Prefecture, Japan

Higashikagawa 東かがわ市
- City
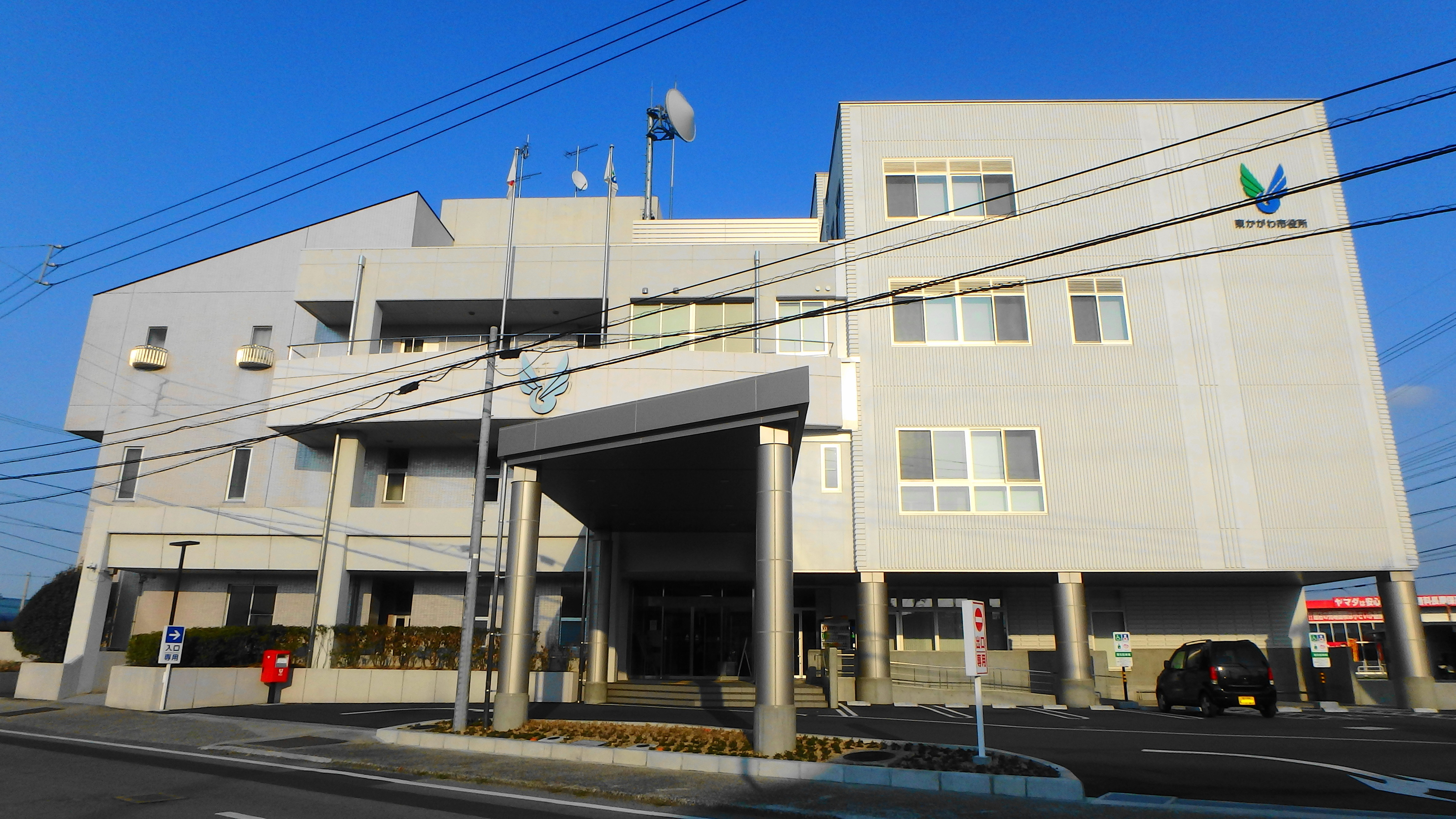
- Higashikagawa City Hall

- Flag Emblem

- Location in Japan
- Coordinates: 34°15′N 134°22′E
- Country: Japan
- Region: Shikoku
- Prefecture: Kagawa

Government
  - Mayor: Ichiro Uemura

Area
  - Total: 152.83 km^{2} (59.01 sq mi)

Population (2022)
  - Total: 28,627
  - Density: 187.31/km^{2} (485.14/sq mi)
- Time zone: UTC+09:00 (JST)
- City hall address: 1847-1 Minato, Higashikagawa-shi, Kagawa-ken 769-2792
- Climate: Cfa
- Website: Official website

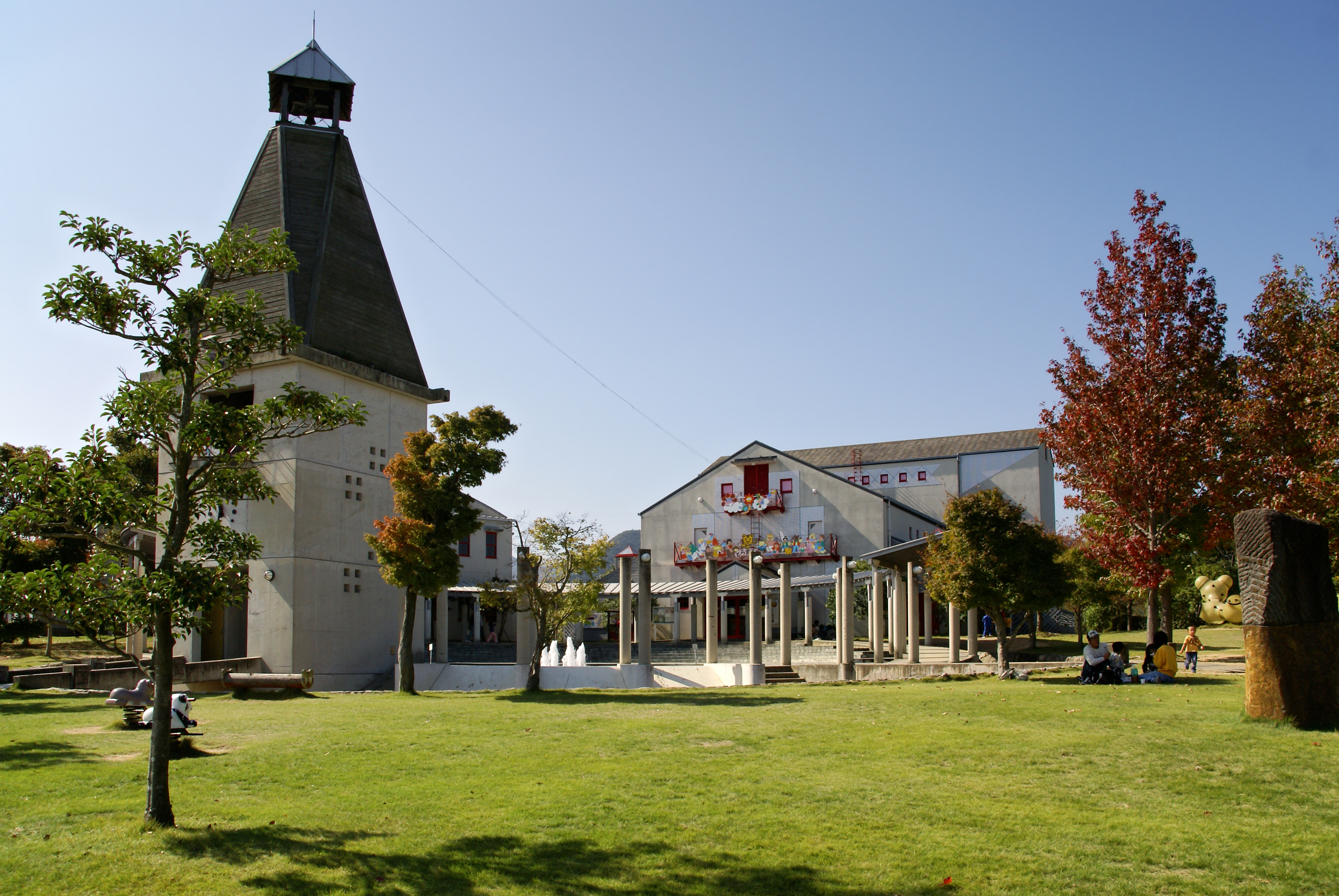
Toramaru Park

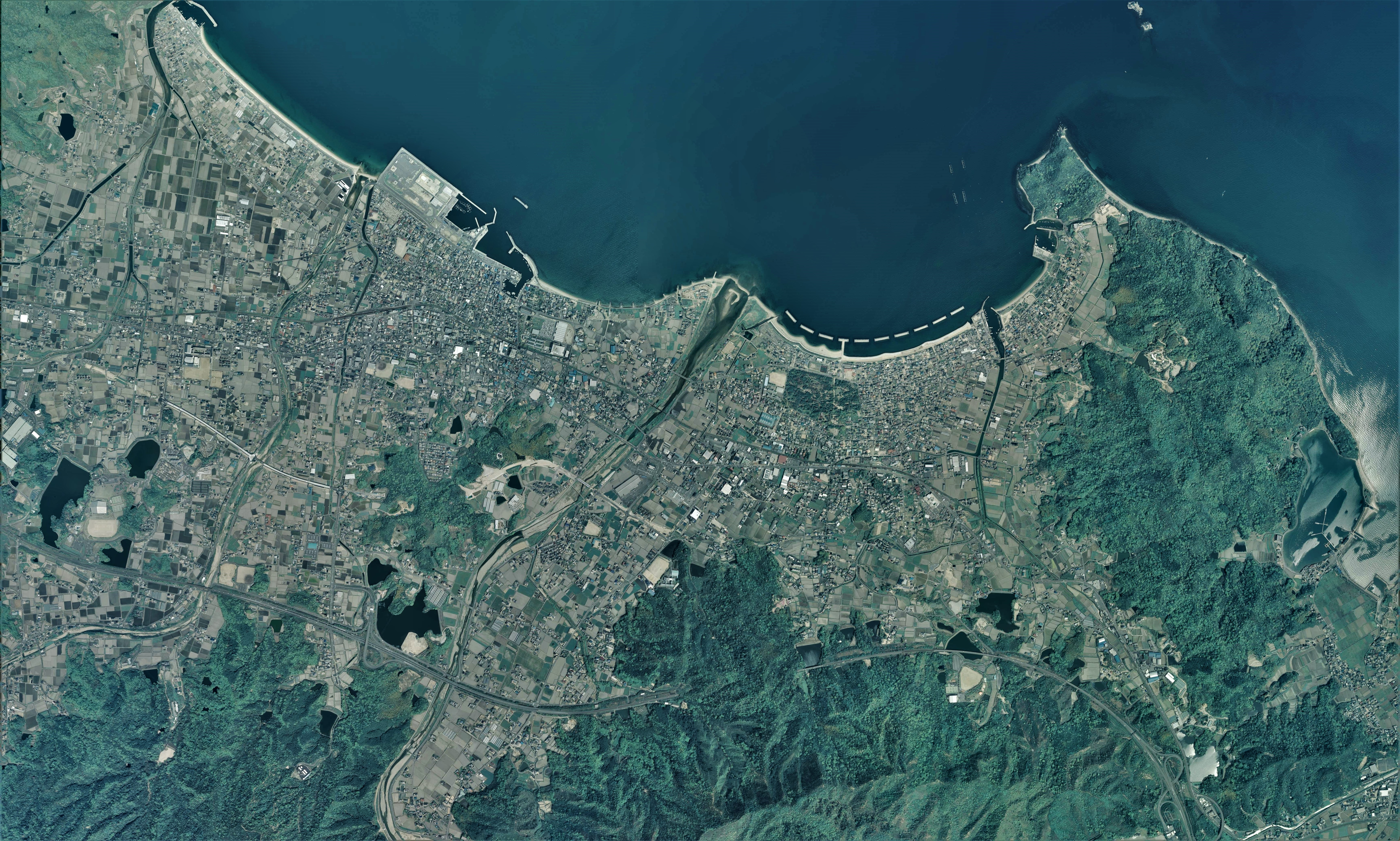
Aerial view of Higashikagawa city center

Higashikagawa (東かがわ市, Higashikagawa-shi) is a city located in Kagawa Prefecture, Japan. As of 30 September 2022, the city had an estimated population of 28,627 in 13,689 households and a population density of 970 persons per km^{2}. The total area of the city is 152.83 square kilometres (59.01 sq mi).

== Geography ==
Higashikagawa is located in far eastern Kagawa Prefecture, on the island of Shikoku, facing the Seto Inland Sea to the north. The south borders Tokushima Prefecture through the Sanuki Mountains, which stretch from east to west. The city is located roughly halfway between Takamatsu City and Tokushima City.

=== Neighbouring municipalities ===
==== Kagawa Prefecture ====
- Sanuki

==== Tokushima Prefecture ====
- Awa
- Itano
- Kamiita
- Naruto

=== Climate ===
Higashikagawa has a humid subtropical climate (Köppen climate classification Cfa) with hot, humid summers, and cool winters. Some rain falls throughout the year, but the months from May to September have the heaviest rain. The average annual temperature in Higashikagawa is 15.9 °C (60.6 °F). The average annual rainfall is 1,343.6 mm (52.90 in) with September as the wettest month. The temperatures are highest on average in August, at around 27.2 °C (81.0 °F), and lowest in January, at around 5.5 °C (41.9 °F). The highest temperature ever recorded in Higashikagawa was 38.9 °C (102.0 °F) on 28 July 2026; the coldest temperature ever recorded was −6.7 °C (19.9 °F) on 7 February 2018.

Climate data for Hiketa, Higashikagawa (1991−2020 normals, extremes 1978−present)
Month	Jan	Feb	Mar	Apr	May	Jun	Jul	Aug	Sep	Oct	Nov	Dec	Year
Record high °C (°F)	18.4 (65.1)	24.2 (75.6)	28.5 (83.3)	30.9 (87.6)	31.3 (88.3)	36.9 (98.4)	38.9 (102.0)	37.0 (98.6)	37.0 (98.6)	31.5 (88.7)	27.0 (80.6)	23.0 (73.4)	38.9 (102.0)
Mean daily maximum °C (°F)	9.2 (48.6)	9.8 (49.6)	13.1 (55.6)	18.8 (65.8)	23.7 (74.7)	26.4 (79.5)	30.4 (86.7)	31.7 (89.1)	27.8 (82.0)	22.4 (72.3)	17.0 (62.6)	11.8 (53.2)	20.2 (68.3)
Daily mean °C (°F)	5.5 (41.9)	5.7 (42.3)	8.6 (47.5)	13.7 (56.7)	18.6 (65.5)	22.2 (72.0)	26.1 (79.0)	27.2 (81.0)	23.8 (74.8)	18.5 (65.3)	13.1 (55.6)	7.9 (46.2)	15.9 (60.7)
Mean daily minimum °C (°F)	1.8 (35.2)	1.8 (35.2)	4.2 (39.6)	8.9 (48.0)	14.1 (57.4)	18.7 (65.7)	22.9 (73.2)	23.8 (74.8)	20.6 (69.1)	15.1 (59.2)	9.3 (48.7)	4.3 (39.7)	12.1 (53.8)
Record low °C (°F)	−5.3 (22.5)	−6.7 (19.9)	−4.5 (23.9)	−0.8 (30.6)	4.4 (39.9)	10.1 (50.2)	16.6 (61.9)	17.2 (63.0)	10.6 (51.1)	4.3 (39.7)	1.6 (34.9)	−3.0 (26.6)	−6.7 (19.9)
Average precipitation mm (inches)	36.3 (1.43)	44.1 (1.74)	72.9 (2.87)	78.6 (3.09)	111.3 (4.38)	159.3 (6.27)	159.4 (6.28)	168.6 (6.64)	244.0 (9.61)	149.0 (5.87)	62.0 (2.44)	46.2 (1.82)	1,343.6 (52.90)
Average precipitation days (≥ 1.0 mm)	6.6	6.8	9.8	9.6	8.8	11.3	10.1	8.6	10.5	8.9	6.9	6.6	104.5
Mean monthly sunshine hours	147.6	140.3	176.7	202.5	207.3	154.2	194.6	227.1	156.6	154.3	137.5	137.6	2,039.1
Source: Japan Meteorological Agency

== Demographics ==
Per Japanese census data, the population of Higashikagawa in 2020 is 28,279 people. Higashikagawa has been conducting censuses since 1920.

Historical population
Year	Pop.	±%
1920	32,161	—
1925	32,137	−0.1%
1930	33,909	+5.5%
1935	34,830	+2.7%
1940	34,326	−1.4%
1945	46,248	+34.7%
1950	45,831	−0.9%
1955	44,662	−2.6%
1960	44,428	−0.5%
1965	44,577	+0.3%
1970	42,572	−4.5%
1975	43,049	+1.1%
1980	43,110	+0.1%
1985	42,446	−1.5%
1990	40,875	−3.7%
1995	39,226	−4.0%
2000	37,760	−3.7%
2005	35,929	−4.8%
2010	33,646	−6.4%
2015	31,031	−7.8%
2020	28,279	−8.9%
Higashikagawa population statistics

== History ==
The area of Higashikagawa was part of ancient Sanuki Province. From the Heian period the Hiketa port prospered as a good natural harbor and a gateway to Shikoku from the Kinai region. From the Sengoku period, Hiketa Castle was a stronghold of the Ikoma clan and a castle town developed around the fortifications. Even today, many of the intricate alleyways and old buildings from the Edo and Meiji periods still exist, preserving the atmosphere of a pre-modern fishing town. During the Edo Period, this area was part of the holdings of Takamatsu Domain. Following the Meiji restoration, the area was organized into villages within Ōchi District, Kagawa with the creation of the modern municipalities system on 15 February 1890. Hiketa was elevated to town status on 1 October 1909. The city of Higashikagawa was the result of a merger on 1 April 2003 between Hiketa and the towns of Ōchi and Shirotori, both from Ōkawa District (which was dissolved as a result of the merger).

== Government ==
Higashikagawa has a mayor-council form of government with a directly elected mayor and a unicameral city council of 18 members. Higashikagawa contributes two members to the Kagawa Prefectural Assembly. In terms of national politics, the city is within the Kagawa 2nd district of the lower house of the Diet of Japan.

== Economy ==
Higashikagawa has a mixed economy centered on light manufacturing, commercial fishing and agriculture. Traditionally, the city was noted for its production of gloves, claiming a 90% market share; however, due to labor costs, much of the market has been lost to China and southeast Asia. Another prominent industry is the manufacturing of bearings. JTEKT (formerly Koyo Seiko), one of the major companies of the Toyota Group, produces 25% of the global market share of tapered roller bearings. The former town of Hiketa is a center for producing wasanbon, a fine-grained sugar traditional to the region. In terms of fishing, Yellowtail was first successfully farmed here.

== Education ==
Higashikagawa has two public elementary schools and two public middle schools operated by the city government, and one public high schools operated by the Kagawa Prefectural Board of Education.

== Transportation ==
=== Railways ===
JR Shikoku - Kōtoku Line

- Sanuki-Aioi - Hiketa - Sanuki-Shirotori - Sambommatsu - Nibu

=== Highways ===
- Takamatsu Expressway
- National Route 11
- National Route 318
- National Route 377

== Local attractions ==
- Hiketa Castle, where the Battle of Hiketa was fought in 1583, are in the eastern part of the city.
- Toramaru Puppet Land, a puppet theater, operates near Ōchi.
- Shirotori Zoo is the only zoo in Kagawa Prefecture.

== Noted people from Higashikagawa ==
- Shōzō Fujii, Olympic gold medalist judoka
- Shizuko Kasagi, singer and actress
- Kono Yasui, biologist, first woman Phd in Japan
- Yukiharu Yoshitaka, Olympic gold medalist judoka
- Miyoshi Etsuo, businessman and Esperantist
