= Sako Station =

Railway station in Tokushima, Japan

T01 B01 Sako Station 佐古駅
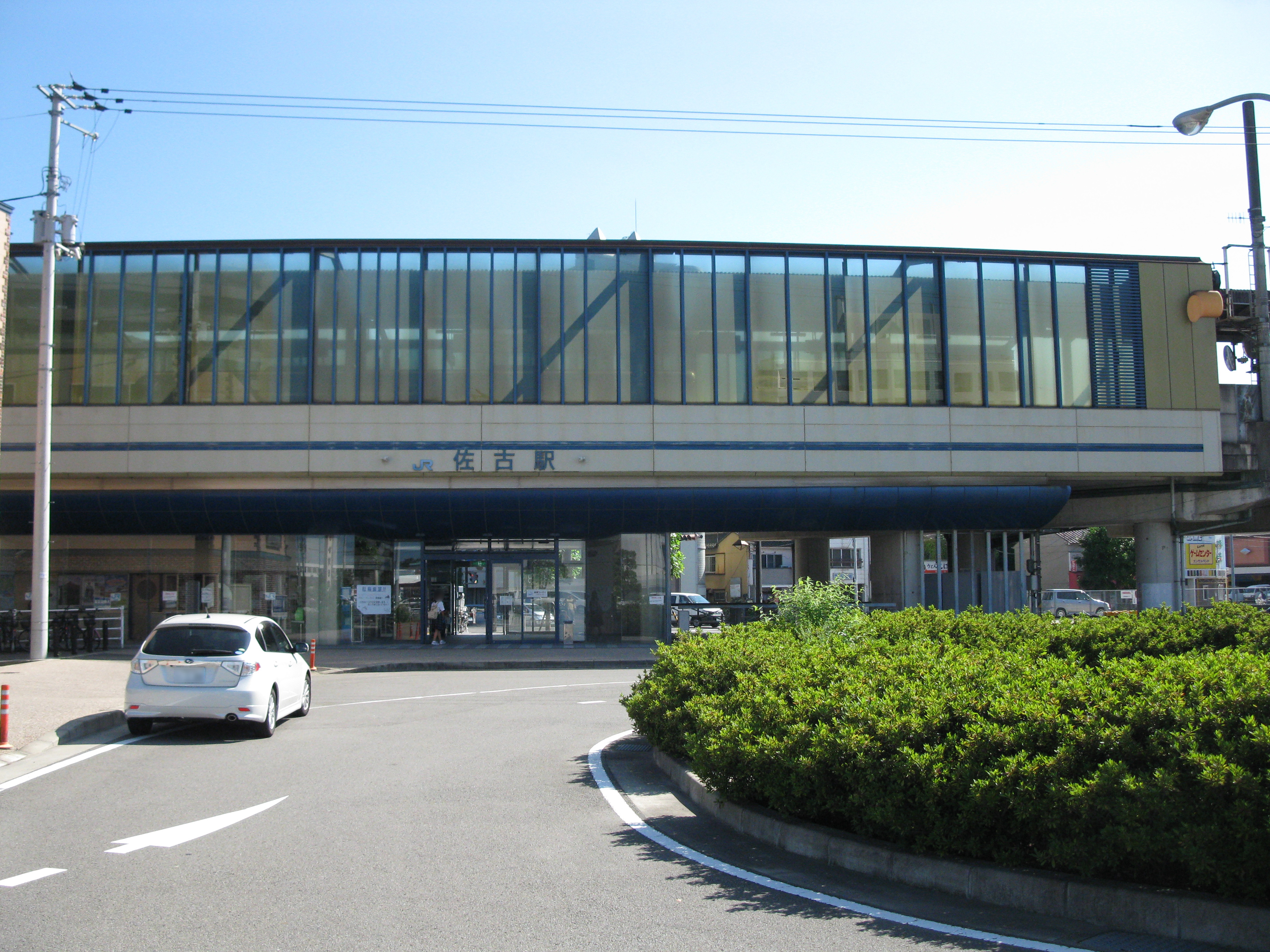
- Sako Station Entrance in 2010

General information
- Location: 19 Sako Nibanchō, Tokushima City, Tokushima Prefecture 770-0022; Japan
- Coordinates: 34°04′49″N 134°32′18″E
- Operator: JR Shikoku
- Lines: Tokushima Line; Kōtoku Line
- Distance: 67.5 km (41.9 mi) from Tsukuda (Tokushima Line); 73.1 km (45.4 mi) from Takamatsu (Kōtoku Line)
- Platforms: 1 island platform
- Tracks: 2

Construction
- Structure type: Elevated
- Cycle facilities: Bike parking under elevated structure
- Accessible: Yes - elevators to platform

Other information
- Status: Staffed - JR ticket window
- Station code: B01, T01

History
- Opened: 20 March 1935; 91 years ago

Passengers
- FY2019: 856

Services
Preceding station	JR Shikoku	Following station
Kuramoto B02 towards Awa-Ikeda	Tokushima Line	Tokushima T00 Terminus
Yoshinari T02 towards Takamatsu	Kōtoku Line	Tokushima T00 Terminus
Uzushio does not stop here
Tsurugisan does not stop here
Location
- Location within Tokushima Prefecture Location within Japan

Sako Station (佐古駅, Sako-eki) is a junction passenger railway station located in the city of Tokushima, Tokushima Prefecture, Japan. It is operated by JR Shikoku and has two station numbers: "B01" for the Tokushima Line and "T01" for the Kōtoku Line.

== Lines ==
Sako Station is served by both the Tokushima Line and the Kōtoku Line. On the Tokushima Line, the station is considered the official terminus and is located 67.5 km from the opposing terminus at Tsukuda. Both the local and limited express services of the Tokushima Line run on to Tokushima but this latter station is not considered part of the line and it does not bear a station number with the "B" prefix.

On the Kōtoku Line, the station is 73.1 km from the beginning of the line at Takamatsu.

Only trains from the local services of the Tokushima and Kōtoku Lines stop at Sako. In addition, although Ikenotani is the official start point of the Naruto Line, many of the trains of its local service begin and end at Tokushima. These trains also stop at Sako.

== Layout ==
The station consists of an island platform serving 2 elevated tracks. A waiting area, kiosk and a JR ticket window (without a Midori no Madoguchi facility) located on the 1st level of the station. Steps and an elevator provide access to the island platform at the second level. Parking for bicycles is available under the elevated tracks.

=== Platforms ===
1	B Tokushima Line	for Anabuki and Awa-Ikeda for Tokushima and Anan
2	T Kōtoku Line (Naruto Line)	for Tokushima and Anan for Itano, Takamatsu and Naruto

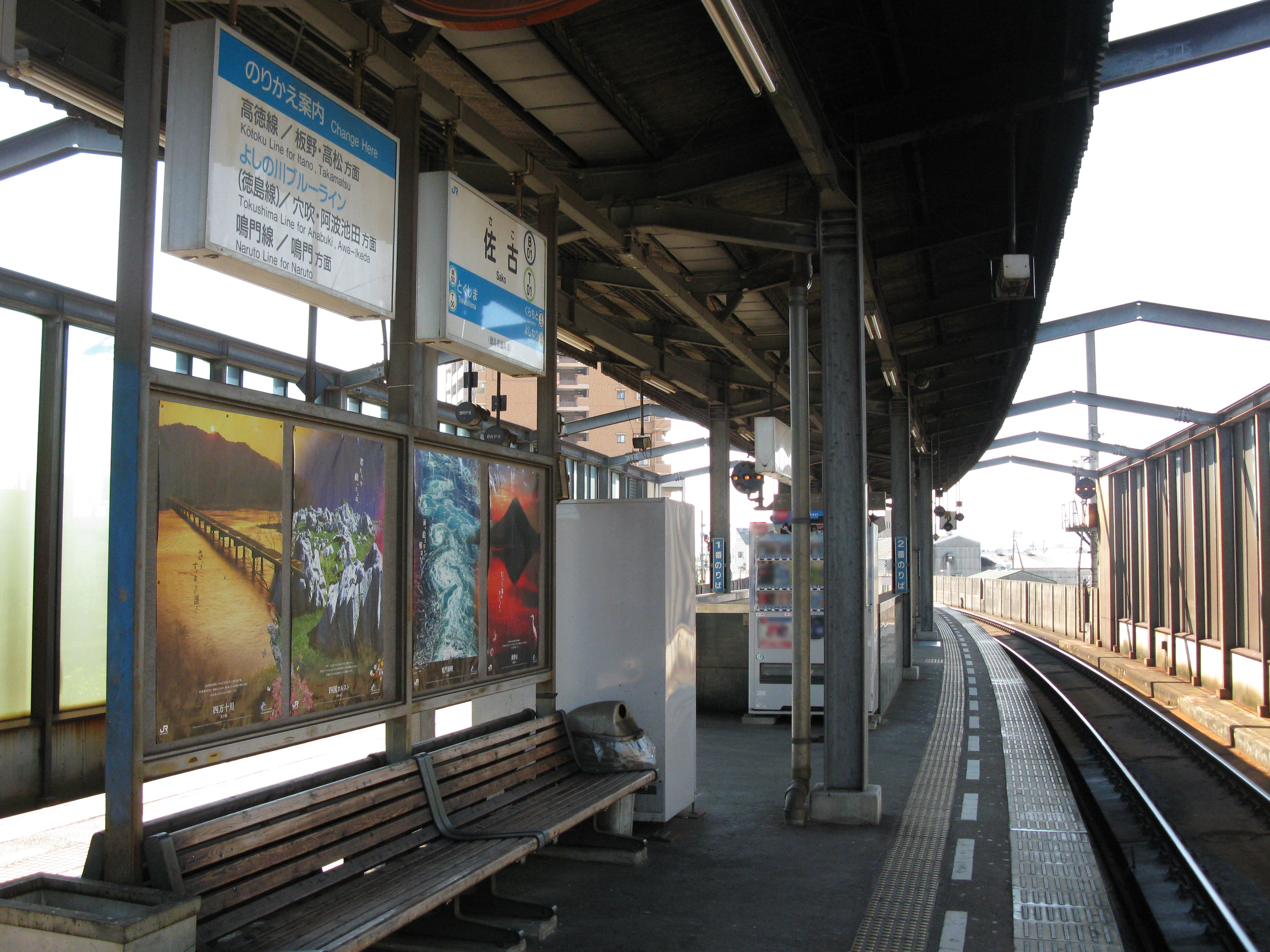
A view of the island platform looking in the direction of Yoshinari.

== History ==
The station was opened Japanese Government Railways (JGR) on 20 March 1935 as an added station on the existing Tokushima Line (later the Tokushima Main Line). With the privatization of Japanese National Railways (JNR), the successor of JGR, on 1 April 1987, the station came under the control of JR Shikoku. On 1 June 1988, the line was renamed the Tokushima Line and Sako was designated as the official terminus.

== Passenger statistics ==
In fiscal 2019, the station was used by an average of 856 passengers daily

== Surrounding area ==
- JR Shikoku Bus Tokushima Branch
- Tokushima City Athletics Stadium

== See also ==
- List of railway stations in Japan
