= Tokushima Station =

Railway station in Tokushima, Japan

T00 M00 Tokushima Station 徳島駅
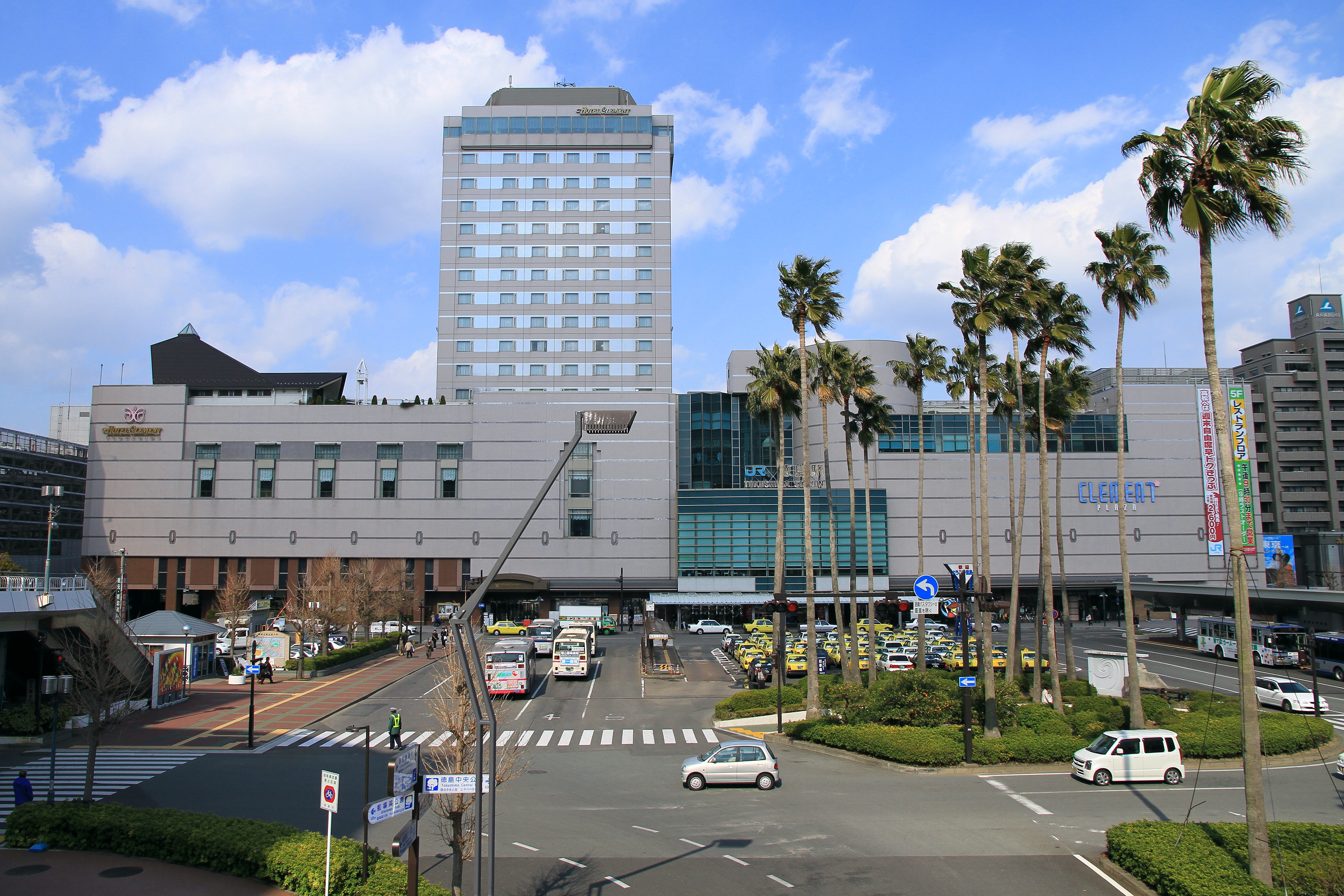
- Tokushima Station building in March 2011

General information
- Location: 1 Terashima Honchō-nishi, Tokushima City; Tokushima Prefecture; Japan
- Coordinates: 34°4′28″N 134°33′4″E
- Operator: JR Shikoku
- Lines: Kōtoku Line; Tokushima Line; Mugi Line
- Platforms: 1 island + 1 side platform

Other information
- Status: Staffed (Midori no Madoguchi)
- Station code: M00, T00
- Website: Official website

History
- Opened: 16 February 1899; 127 years ago

Passengers
- FY2023: 6,502

Services
Preceding station	JR Shikoku	Following station
Sako T01 towards Takamatsu	Kōtoku Line	Terminus
Sako B01 towards Awa-Ikeda	Tokushima Line	Terminus
Terminus	Mugi Line	Awa-Tomida M01 towards Awa-Kainan
Limited Express
Kuramoto B02 towards Awa-Ikeda	Tsurugisan	Terminus
Shōzui T03 towards Kojima	Uzushio	Terminus
Location
- Location within Tokushima Prefecture Location within Japan

Tokushima Station (徳島駅, Tokushima-eki) is a junction passenger railway station located in the city of Tokushima in Tokushima Prefecture, Japan, operated by the Shikoku Railway Company (JR Shikoku).

== Lines ==
Tokushima Station is the terminus of both the 74.5-kilometre (46.3 mi) Kōtoku Line (station number "T00") to Takamatsu and the 77.8-kilometre (48.3 mi) Mugi Line (station number "M00") to Awa-Kainan. It is also served by direct trains to and from the Tokushima Line and Naruto Line.

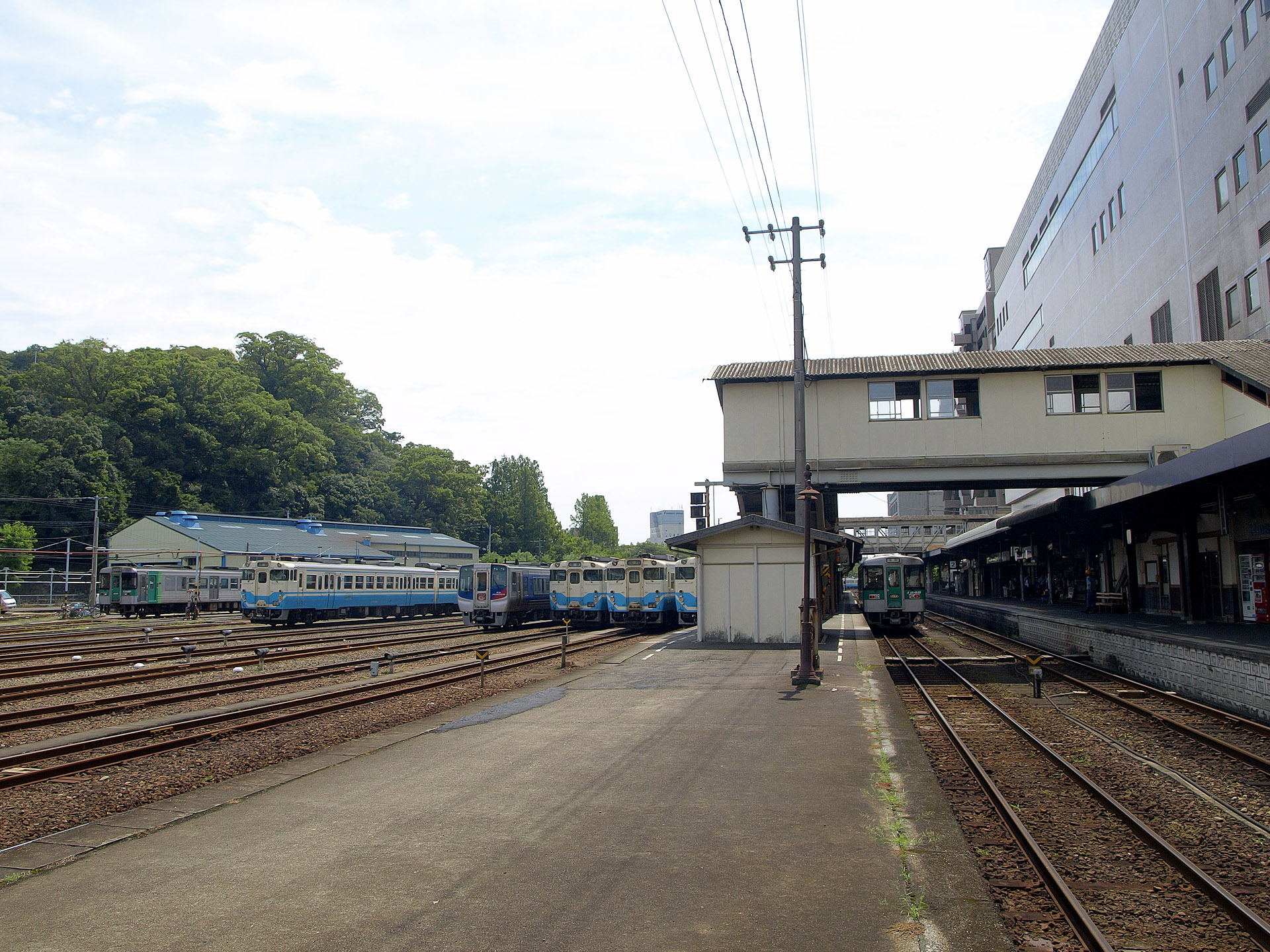
The platforms at Tokushima Station in August 2010

== Layout ==
The station consists of one island platform and one side platform with a notch to enable it to service two tracks. The station building is an 18-story structure with a multi-storey car park. The exit is only on the south side where the bus terminal is located, and facing the downtown area. The station has a Midori no Madoguchi staffed ticket office.

== History ==
The station opened on 16 February 1899. With the privatization of Japanese National Railways (JNR), the successor of JGR, on 1 April 1987, the station came under the control of JR Shikoku.

== Passenger statistics ==
In fiscal 2023, the station was used by an average of 6502 passengers daily.

== Surrounding area ==
The station is located in the center of downtown Tokushima.

== See also ==
- List of railway stations in Japan
