= Uzushio (train) =

Japanese limited express train service

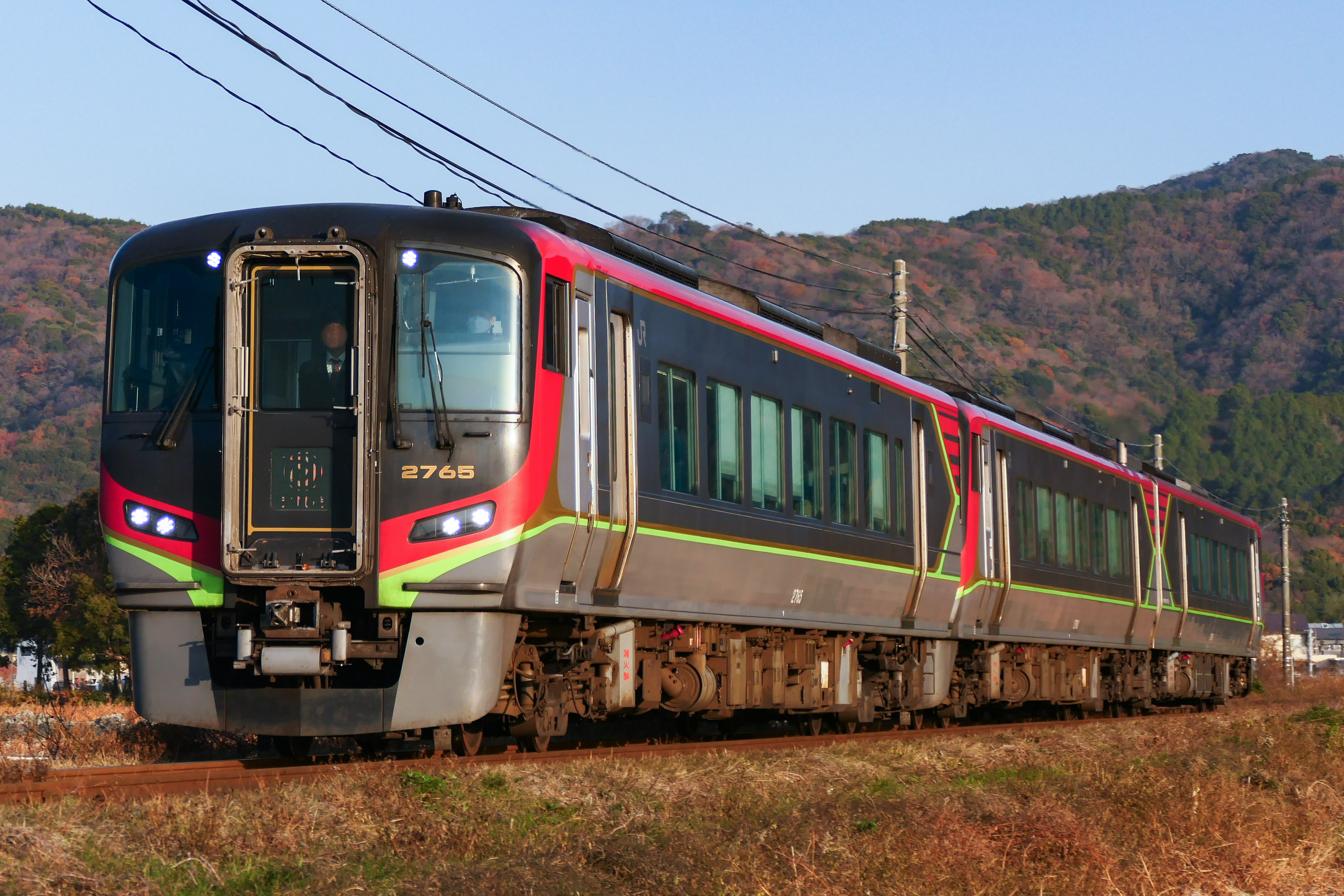
- 2700 series DMU on an Uzushio service in 2024

Overview
- Service type: Limited express
- Status: Operational
- First service: 1988
- Current operator: JR Shikoku

Route
- Termini: Tokushima; Takamatsu
- Stops: 16
- Distance travelled: 74.5 km (46.3 mi) (Tokushima - Takamatsu)
- Average journey time: 1 hour 15 minutes approx (Tokushima - Takamatsu)
- Service frequency: 16.5 return workings daily
- Line used: Kōtoku Line

On-board services
- Classes: Standard only (reserved and non-reserved seats)
- Catering facilities: None

Technical
- Rolling stock: 2600 series, 2700 series DMUs
- Electrification: Diesel
- Operating speed: 130 km/h (81 mph) (2700 series); 120 km/h (75 mph) (2600 series); 110 km/h (68 mph) (Kiha 185 series)

The Uzushio (うずしお) is a limited express train service in Japan operated by Shikoku Railway Company (JR Shikoku), which runs from Takamatsu to Tokushima.

The Uzushio service was introduced on 10 April 1988.

== Route ==
The main stations served by this service are as follows.

Takamatsu - Tokushima.

== Rolling stock ==
- 2600 series 2-, or 4-car tilting DMUs (since 2017)
- 2700 series 2-, 3-, 4-, or 5-car tilting DMUs (since 2019)
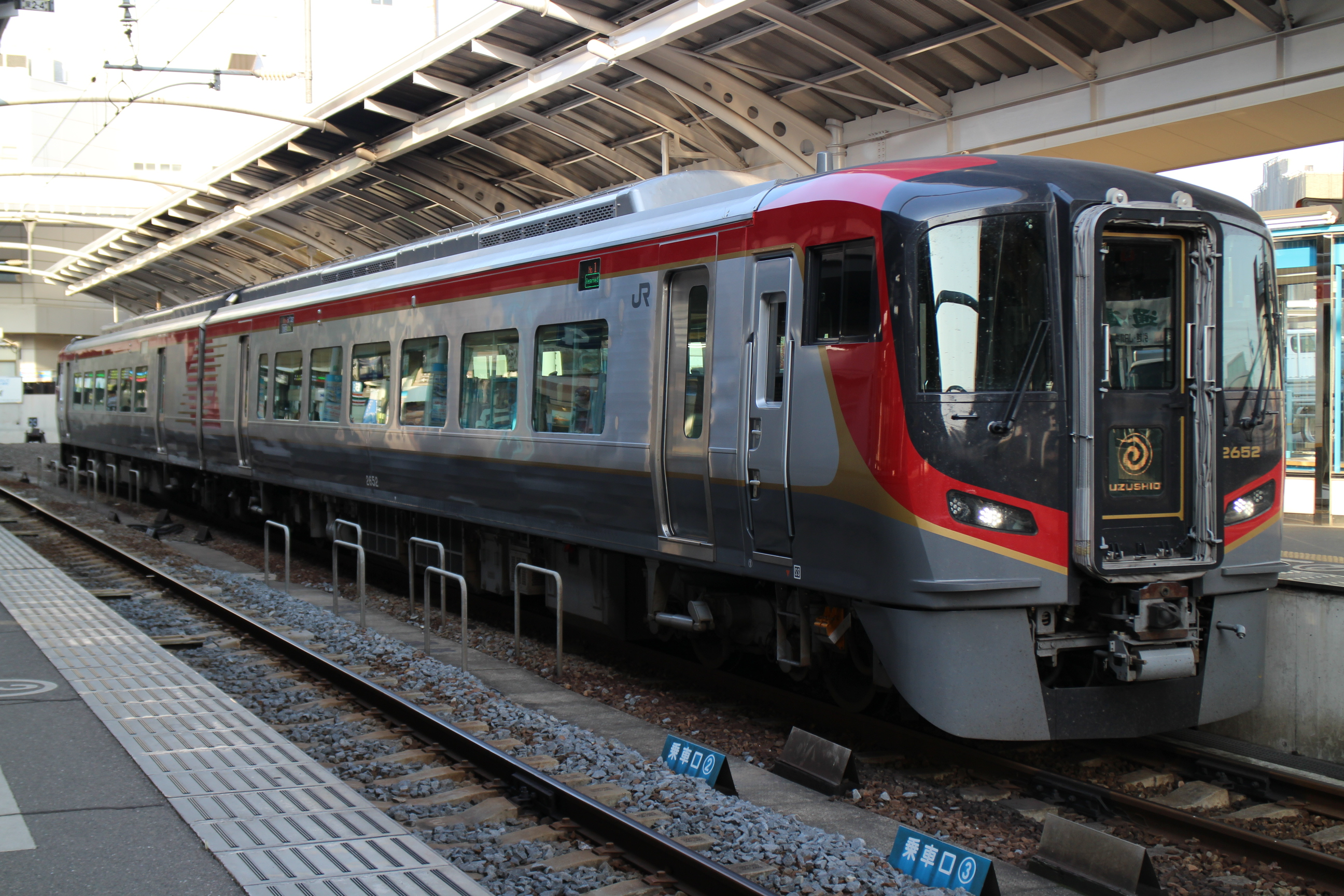
A 2600 series DMU on an Uzushio service in 2018

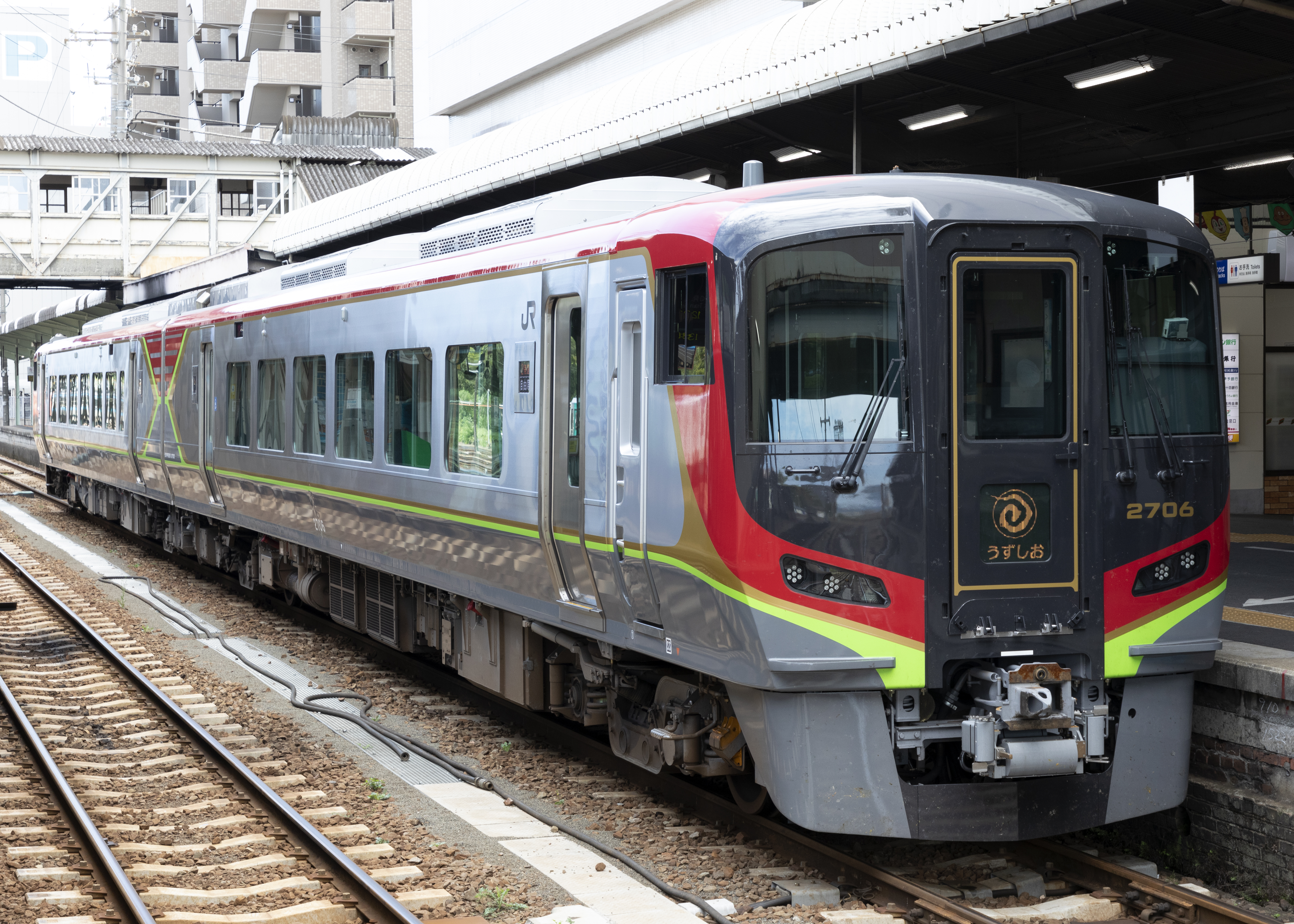
A 2700 series DMU on an Uzushio service in 2019

Most trains are operated by 2700 series, while some are operated by 2600 series.

=== Past rolling stock ===
- KiHa 181 series DMUs (1993)
- 2000 series tilting DMUs (1999–2011)
- N2000 series tilting DMUs (1998–2020)
- KiHa 185 series 2-, 3-, or 4-car DMUs (1988–2025)
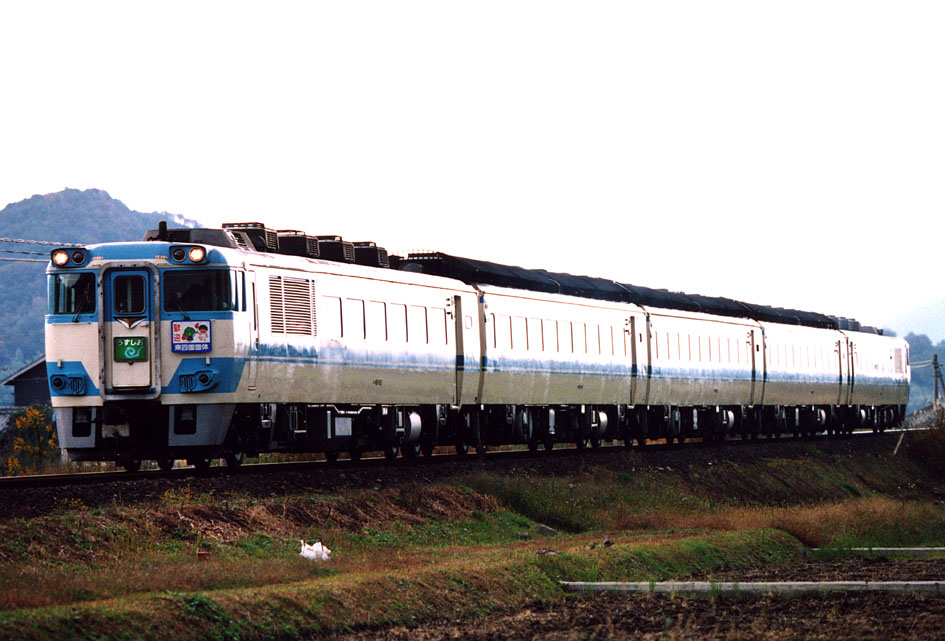
A KiHa 181 series DMU on an Uzushio service in 1993

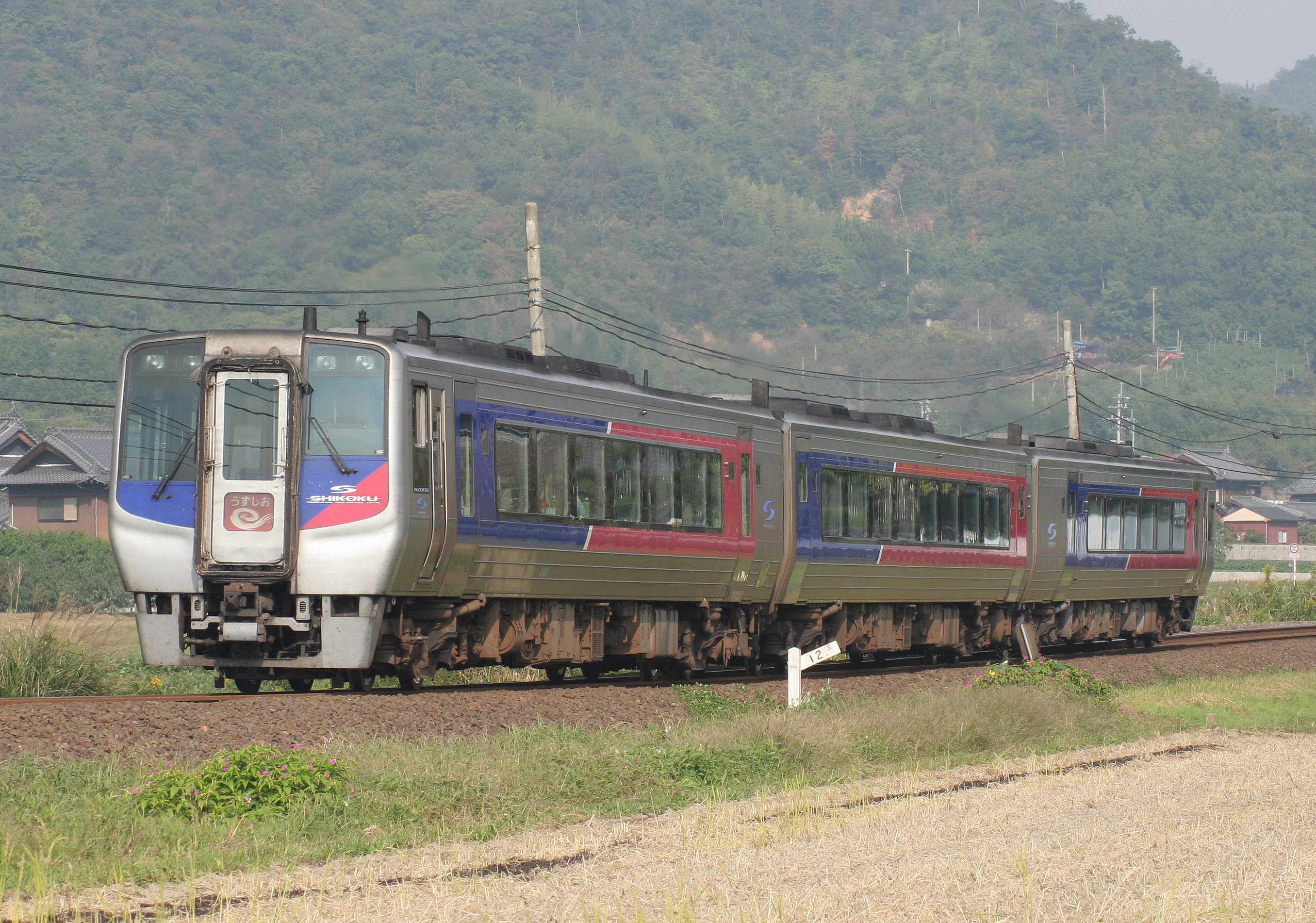
An N2000 series DMU on an Uzushio service in October 2008

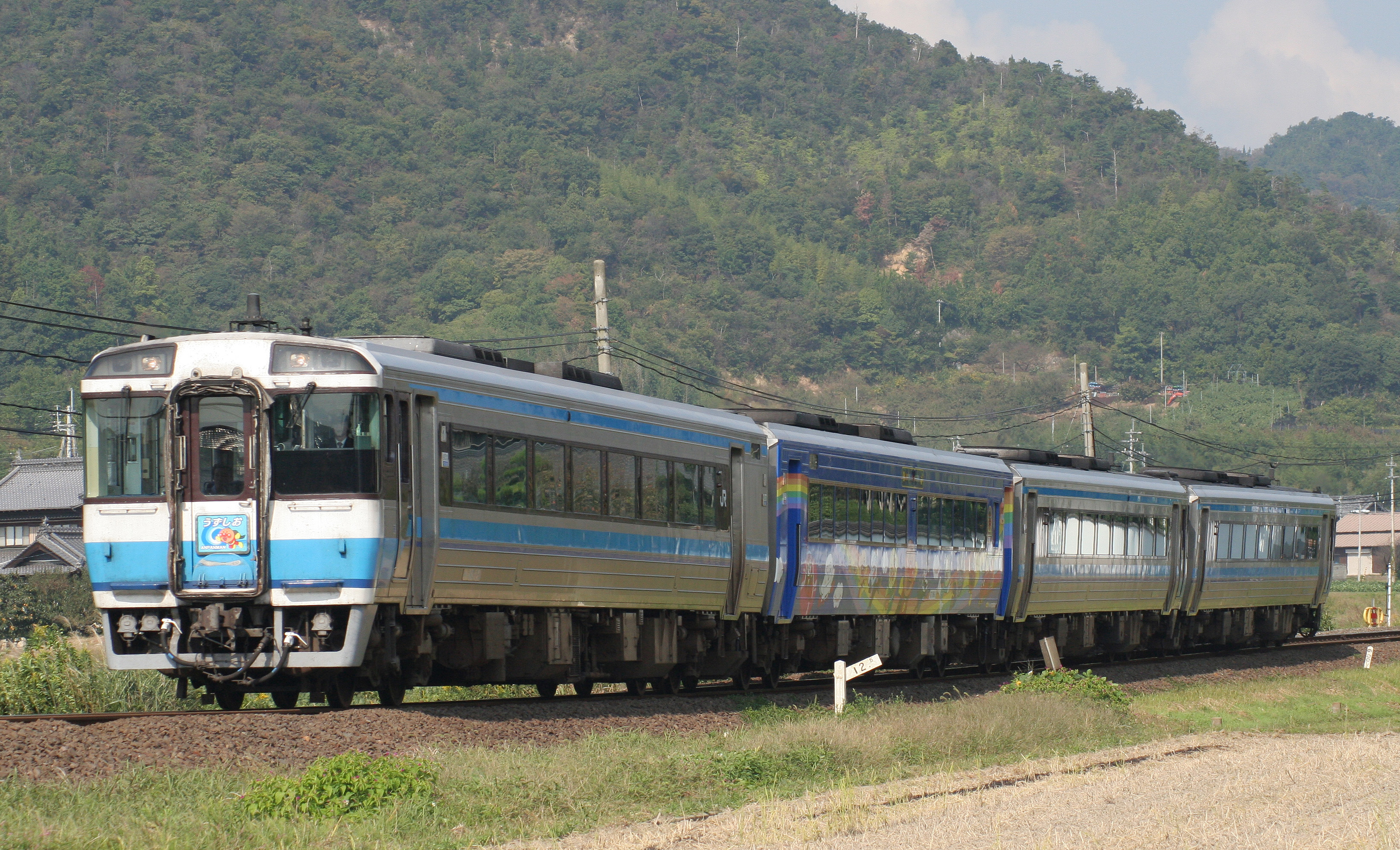
A KiHa 185 series DMU on an Uzushio service in 2008

== History ==
Uzushio services were introduced on 10 April 1988. From May 1998, N2000 series tilting DMUs were introduced.

The train previously also ran to Okayama. On 15 March 2025, two daily return services running 146.3 km (90.9 mi) across the Great Seto Bridge between Tokushima and Okayama were discontinued, and the KiHa 185 series trains were taken out of service.
