= Naruto (disambiguation) =

Naruto is a Japanese manga series.

Naruto or Narutō may also refer to:

- Naruto (TV series), a Japanese animated television series based on the manga series
- Naruto Uzumaki, the protagonist of the manga and anime series

== Places ==
- 94356 Naruto, a main-belt asteroid
- Narutō, Chiba, a former town in Chiba Prefecture, Japan
- Naruto, Tokushima, a city in Tokushima Prefecture, Japan
  - Naruto Strait, between Awaji Island and Naruto city, Shikoku, Japan
    - Naruto whirlpools, tidal whirlpools in the Naruto Strait

=== Facilities and structures ===
- Naruto University of Education, a national university located in Naruto, Tokushima
- Naruto Athletic Stadium, a multi-purpose stadium in Naruto, Tokushima
- Naruto Line, a railway line in Tokushima Prefecture, Japan
- Naruto Station, a train station in Naruto, Tokushima Prefecture, Japan
- Narutō Station, a train station in Sanmu, Chiba Prefecture, Japan
- Ōnaruto Bridge, connecting Awaji Island and Naruto city in Shikoku

== People, figures, characters ==
- Naruto (toshiyori), sumo elder
- Naruto, a macaque in the monkey selfie copyright dispute
- Naruto, a character in Cosmic Carnage
- Owen "Naruto" Cenazandotti, a streamer involved in the death of Jean Pormanove

== Other uses ==
- Narutomaki, a kind of kamaboko, or cured fish product
- Naruto stable (2017), a stable of sumo wrestlers
