= Konpiramae Station =

Railway station in Naruto, Tokushima Prefecture, Japan

N08 Konpiramae Station 金比羅前駅
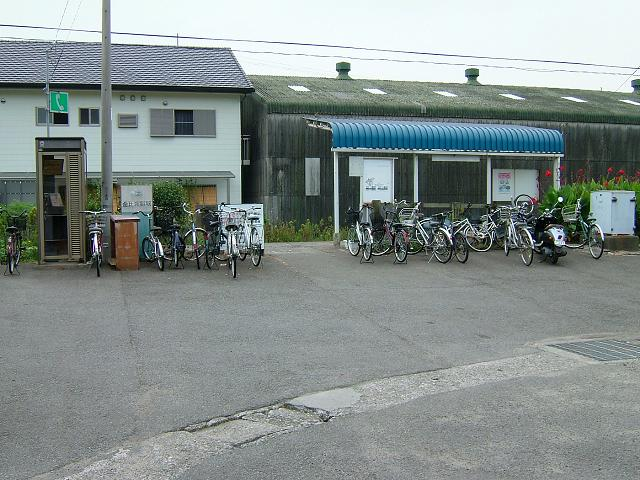

General information
- Location: Muyacho Kizu, Naruto City, Tokushima Prefecture 772-0004; Japan
- Coordinates: 34.1697°N 134.5851°E
- Operator: JR Shikoku
- Line: Naruto Line
- Distance: 5.7 km (3.5 mi) from Ikenotani
- Platforms: 1 side platform
- Tracks: 1

Construction
- Structure type: At grade
- Accessible: Yes - platform at same level as access road

Other information
- Status: Unstaffed
- Station code: N08

History
- Opened: 1 July 1916; 110 years ago

Passengers
- FY2019: 70

Services
Preceding station	JR Shikoku	Following station
Kyōkaimae N07 towards Ikenotani	Naruto Line	Muya N09 towards Naruto
Location
- Location within Tokushima Prefecture Location within Japan

Konpiramae Station (金比羅前駅, Konpiramae-eki) is a passenger railway station located in the city of Naruto, Tokushima Prefecture, Japan. It is operated by JR Shikoku and has the station number "N06".

== Lines ==
The station is served by the JR Shikoku Naruto Line and is located 5.7 km from the beginning of the line at Ikenotani. Only local services stop at the station.

== Layout ==
Konpiramae Station, which is unstaffed, consists of a side platform serving a single track. There is no station building, only a shelter on the platform. The platform is at the same level as the access road and may be entered without the need for a ramp or steps.

== History ==
Konpiramae Station was opened by the privately run Awa Electric Railway (later the Awa Railway) on 1 July 1916 as Konpiramae stop. After the Awa Railway was nationalized on 1 July 1933, Japanese Government Railways (JGR) took over control of Konpiramae, upgraded it to a full station and operated it as part of the Awa Line. On 20 March 1935, after some other stations on the line were absorbed into the Kōtoku Main Line, Kyōkaimae became part of the Muya Line. On 1 March 1956, the line was renamed the Naruto Line. On 1 April 1987, with the privatization of Japanese National Railways (JNR), the successor of JGR, the station came under the control of JR Shikoku.

== Passenger statistics ==
In fiscal 2019, the station was used by an average of 70 passengers daily

== Surrounding area ==
- Konpira Jinja
- Japan National Route 11

== See also ==
- List of railway stations in Japan
