= Kyōkaimae Station =

Railway station in Naruto, Tokushima Prefecture, Japan

N07 Kyōkaimae Station 教会前駅
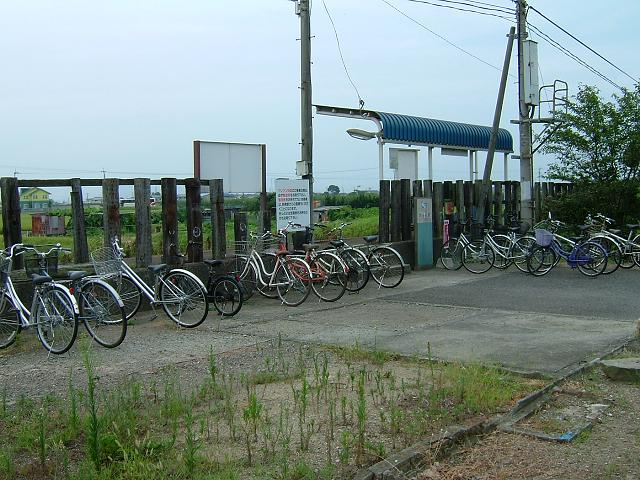

General information
- Location: Muyacho Kizu, Naruto City, Tokushima Prefecture 772-0004; Japan
- Coordinates: 34°10′03″N 134°34′38″E
- Operator: JR Shikoku
- Line: Naruto Line
- Distance: 4.9 km (3.0 mi) from Ikenotani
- Platforms: 1 side platform
- Tracks: 1

Construction
- Structure type: At grade
- Accessible: Yes - ramp leads up to platform

Other information
- Status: Unstaffed
- Station code: N07

History
- Opened: 1 January 1924; 102 years ago
- Former names: Tenrikyōmae Stop (until 1 July 1933)

Passengers
- FY2019: 72

Services
Preceding station	JR Shikoku	Following station
Tatsumichi N06 towards Ikenotani	Naruto Line	Konpiramae N08 towards Naruto
Location
- Location within Tokushima Prefecture Location within Japan

Kyōkaimae Station (教会前駅, Kyōkaimae-eki) is a passenger railway station located in the city of Naruto, Tokushima Prefecture, Japan. It is operated by JR Shikoku and has the station number "N06".

== Lines ==
Kyōkaimae Station is served by the JR Shikoku Naruto Line and is located 4.9 km from the beginning of the line at Ikenotani. Only local services stop at the station.

== Layout ==
The station, which is unstaffed, consists of a side platform serving a single track. There is no station building, only a shelter on the platform. A ramp leads up to the platform from the access road.

== History ==
The station was opened by the privately run Awa Electric Railway (later the Awa Railway) on 1 January 1924 as Tenrikyōmae Stop (天理教前停留場, Tenrikyōmae-teiryūba). After the Awa Railway was nationalized on 1 July 1933, Japanese Government Railways (JGR) took over control of the station. It was upgraded and renamed as Kyōkaimae Station and operated it as part of the Awa Line. On 20 March 1935, after some other stations on the line were absorbed into the Kōtoku Main Line, Kyōkaimae became part of the Muya Line. On 1 March 1956, the line was renamed the Naruto Line. On 1 April 1987, with the privatization of Japanese National Railways (JNR), the successor of JGR, the station came under the control of JR Shikoku.

== Passenger statistics ==
In fiscal 2019, the station was used by an average of 72 passengers daily

== Surrounding area ==
- Tenrikyō cathedral
- Japan National Route 11

== See also ==
- List of railway stations in Japan
