= Yoshinari Station =

Railway station in Tokushima, Japan

T02 Yoshinari Station 吉成駅
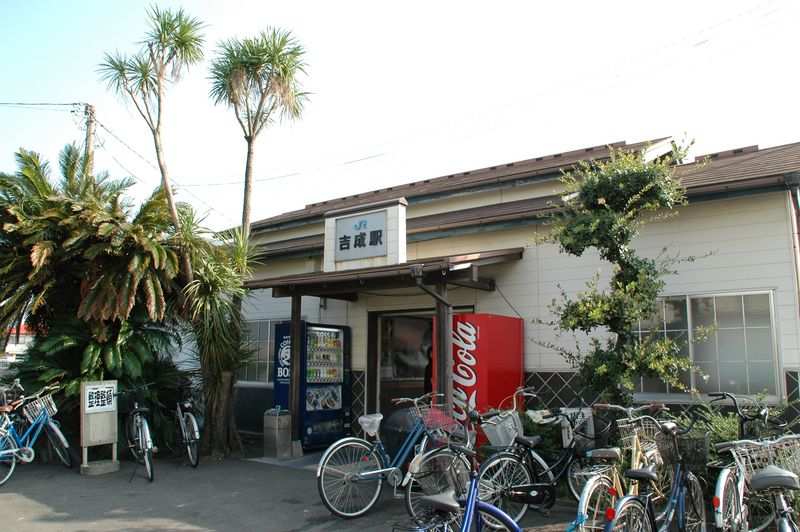
- Yoshinari Station in 2005

General information
- Location: Todoroki Ōjinchō Yoshinari, Tokushima City, Tokushima Prefecture 771-1153; Japan
- Coordinates: 34°07′08″N 134°31′51″E
- Operator: JR Shikoku
- Line: Kōtoku Line
- Distance: 68.2 km (42.4 mi) from Takamatsu
- Platforms: 2 side platforms
- Tracks: 2 + 1 siding

Construction
- Structure type: At grade
- Accessible: No - platforms linked by footbridge

Other information
- Status: Unstaffed
- Station code: T02

History
- Opened: 1 July 1916; 110 years ago

Passengers
- FY2019: 326

Services
Preceding station	JR Shikoku	Following station
Shōzui T03 towards Takamatsu	Kōtoku Line	Sako T01 towards Tokushima
Uzushio does not stop here
Location
- Location within Tokushima Prefecture Location within Japan

Yoshinari Station (吉成駅, Yoshinari-eki) is a passenger railway station located in the city of Tokushima, Tokushima Prefecture, Japan. It is operated by JR Shikoku and has the station number "T02".

== Lines ==
Yoshinari Station is served by the JR Shikoku Kōtoku Line and is located 68.2 km from the beginning of the line at Takamatsu. Only trains from local services stop at the station. In addition, although Ikenotani is the official start point of the Naruto Line, many of the trains of its local service begin and end at Tokushima. These trains also stop at Yoshinari.

== Layout ==
The station consists of two side platforms serving two tracks. The station building is unstaffed and serves only as a waiting room. Access to the opposite platform is by means of a footbridge. A siding runs on the other side of platform 2.

=== Platforms ===
1	T Kōtoku Line (Naruto Line)	Tokushima and Anan
2	T Kōtoku Line (Naruto Line)	for Itano, Takamatsu and Naruto

== Adjacent stations ==
«	Service	»
Naruto Line
Shōzui	Local	Sako

== History ==
The station was opened by the privately run Awa Electric Railway (later the Awa Railway) on 1 July 1916. After the Awa Railway was nationalized on 1 July 1933, Japanese Government Railways (JGR) took over control of the station and operated it as part of the Awa Line. On 20 March 1935, the station became part of the Kōtoku Main Line. With the privatization of JNR on 1 April 1987, the station came under the control of JR Shikoku.

== Passenger statistics ==
In fiscal 2019, the station was used by an average of 326 passengers daily

== Surrounding area ==
- Seikoen Junior and Senior High School,
- Seikouen Elementary School,
- Ojin Junior High School,
- Ojin Elementary School,

== See also ==
- List of railway stations in Japan
