= Shōzui Station =

Railway station in Aizumi, Tokushima prefecture, Japan

T03 Shōzui Station 勝瑞駅
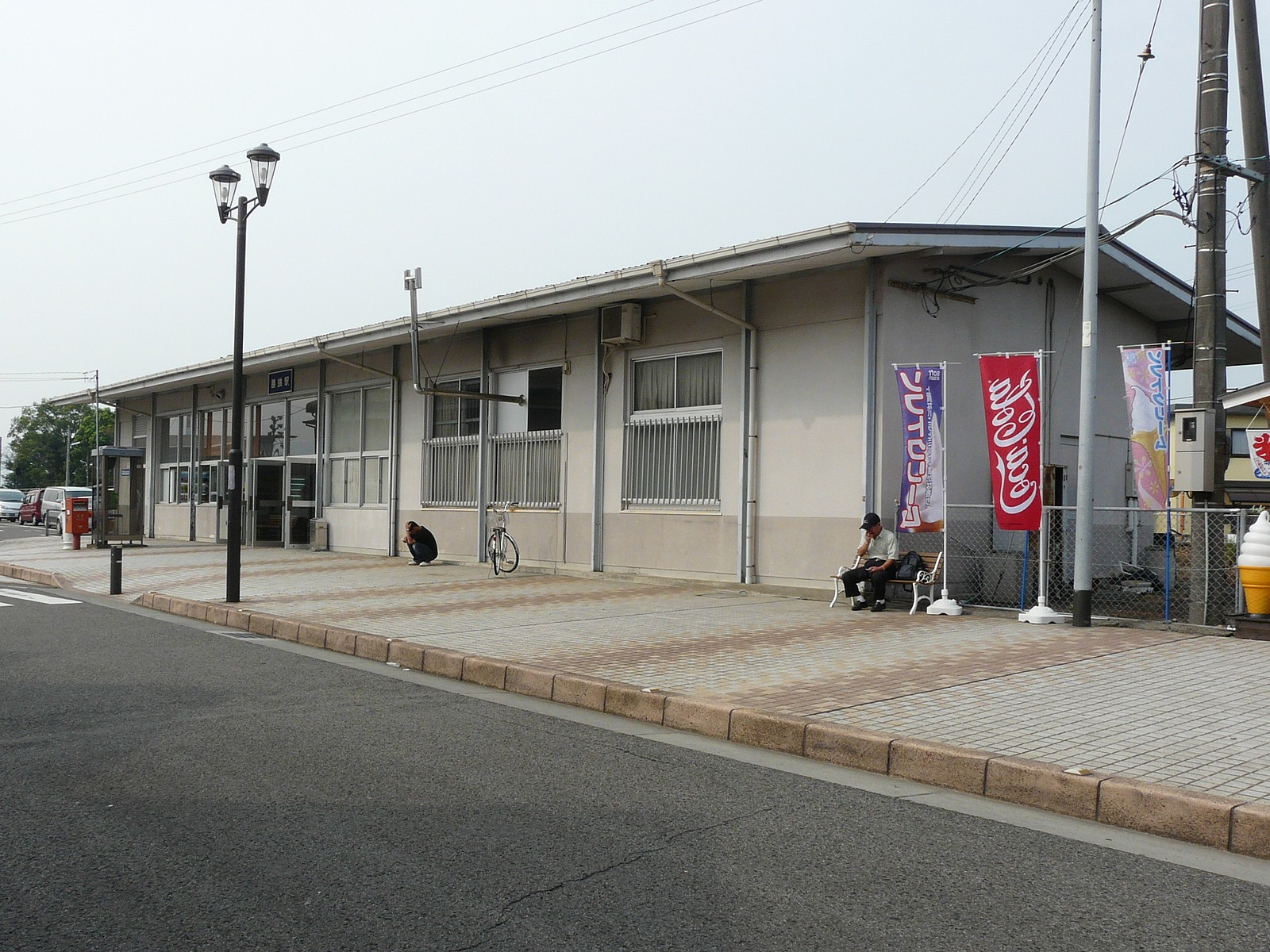
- Shōzui Station, July 2007

General information
- Location: Higashikatsuchi-364-2 Shōzui, Aizumi Town, Itano District, Tokushima Prefecture 771-1273; Japan
- Coordinates: 34°07′41″N 134°31′41″E
- Operator: JR Shikoku
- Line: Kōtoku Line
- Distance: 66.9 km (41.6 mi) from Takamatsu
- Platforms: 2 side platforms
- Tracks: 2

Construction
- Structure type: At grade
- Parking: Available
- Cycle facilities: Large bike parking garage
- Accessible: Yes - level crossing and ramps to platforms

Other information
- Status: Staffed - JR ticket window
- Station code: T03

History
- Opened: 1 July 1916; 110 years ago

Passengers
- FY2019: 1,215

Services
Preceding station	JR Shikoku	Following station
Ikenotani T04 N04 towards Takamatsu	Kōtoku Line	Yoshinari T02 towards Tokushima
Limited Express
Ikenotani T04 N04 towards Kojima	Uzushio	Tokushima T00 Terminus
Location
- Location within Tokushima Prefecture Location within Japan

Shōzui Station (勝瑞駅, Shōzui-eki) is a passenger railway station located in the town of Aizumi, Itano District, Tokushima Prefecture, Japan. It is operated by JR Shikoku and has the station number "T03".

== Lines ==
Shōzui Station is served by the JR Shikoku Kōtoku Line and is located 66.9 km from the beginning of the line at Takamatsu. Besides local services, some trains of the Uzushio limited express between Okayama, Takamatsu and Tokushima also stop at the station. In addition, although Ikenotani is the official start point of the Naruto Line, many of the trains of its local service begin and end at Tokushima. These trains also stop at Shōzui.

== Layout ==
The station consists of two side platforms serving two tracks. Track 2 is the through-track while track 1 is a passing loop. A station building houses a waiting room and a JR ticket window (without a Midori no Madoguchi facility), open for limited hours only. Access to the opposite platform is by means of a footbridge but a level crossing with ramps leading up to the platforms is also available. Parking is available at the station forecourt and there is a two-storey garage for the parking of bicycles.

=== Platforms ===
1	for Tokushima
2	for Itano and Takamatsu for Naruto

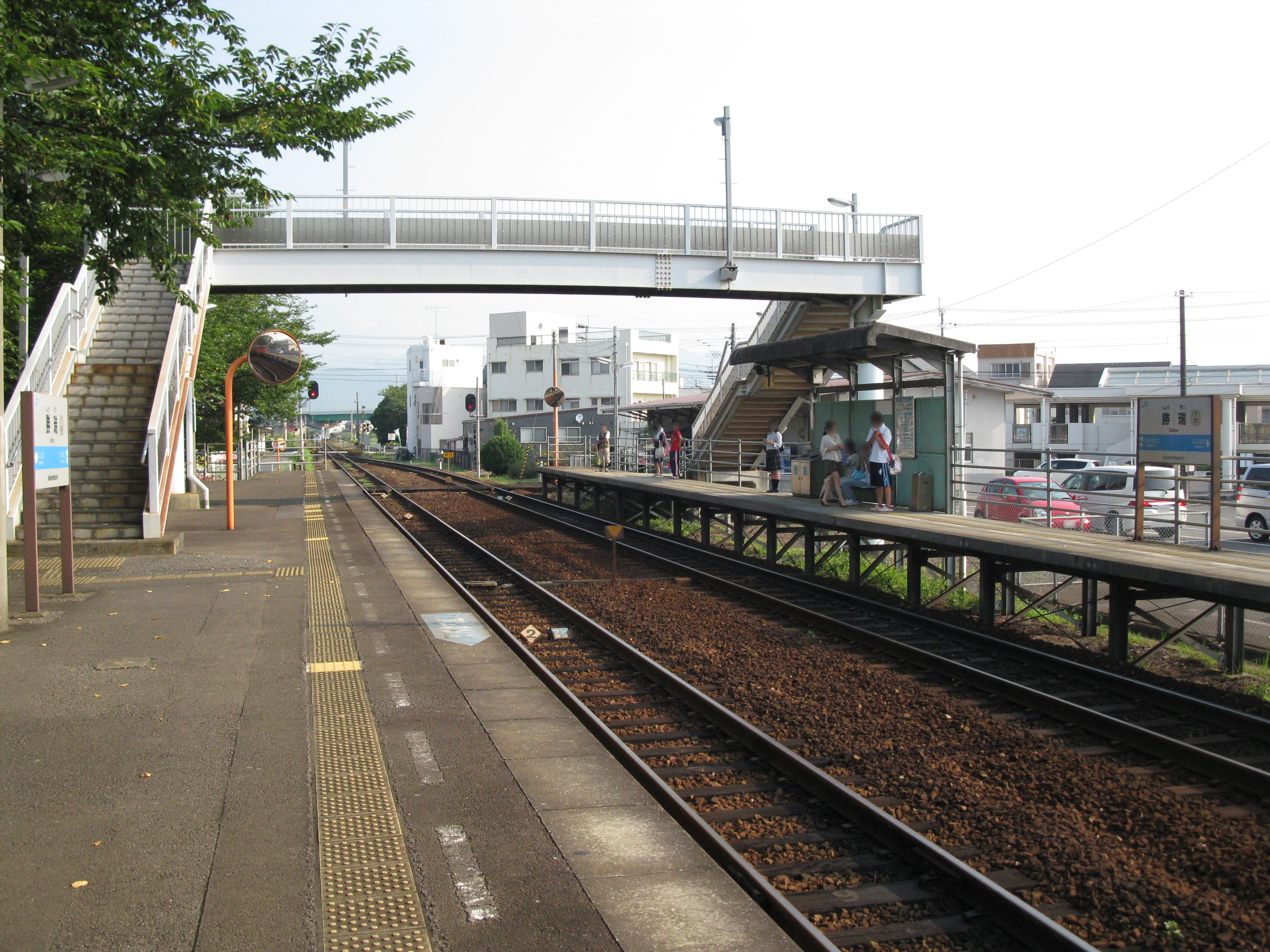
A view of the station platforms looking in the direction of Takamatsu

== History ==
Shōzui Station was opened by the privately run Awa Electric Railway (later the Awa Railway) on 1 July 1916. After the Awa Railway was nationalized on 1 July 1933, Japanese Government Railways (JGR) took over control of the station and operated it as part of the Awa Line. On 20 March 1935, the station became part of the Kōtoku Main Line. With the privatization of JNR on 1 April 1987, the station came under the control of JR Shikoku.

== Passenger statistics ==
In fiscal 2019, the station was used by an average of 1215 passengers daily

== Surrounding area ==
- Tokushima Prefectural Tokushima Kita High School
- Shōzui Castle ruins

== See also ==
- List of railway stations in Japan
