= Tatsumichi Station =

Railway station in Naruto, Tokushima Prefecture, Japan

N06 Tatsumichi Station 立道駅
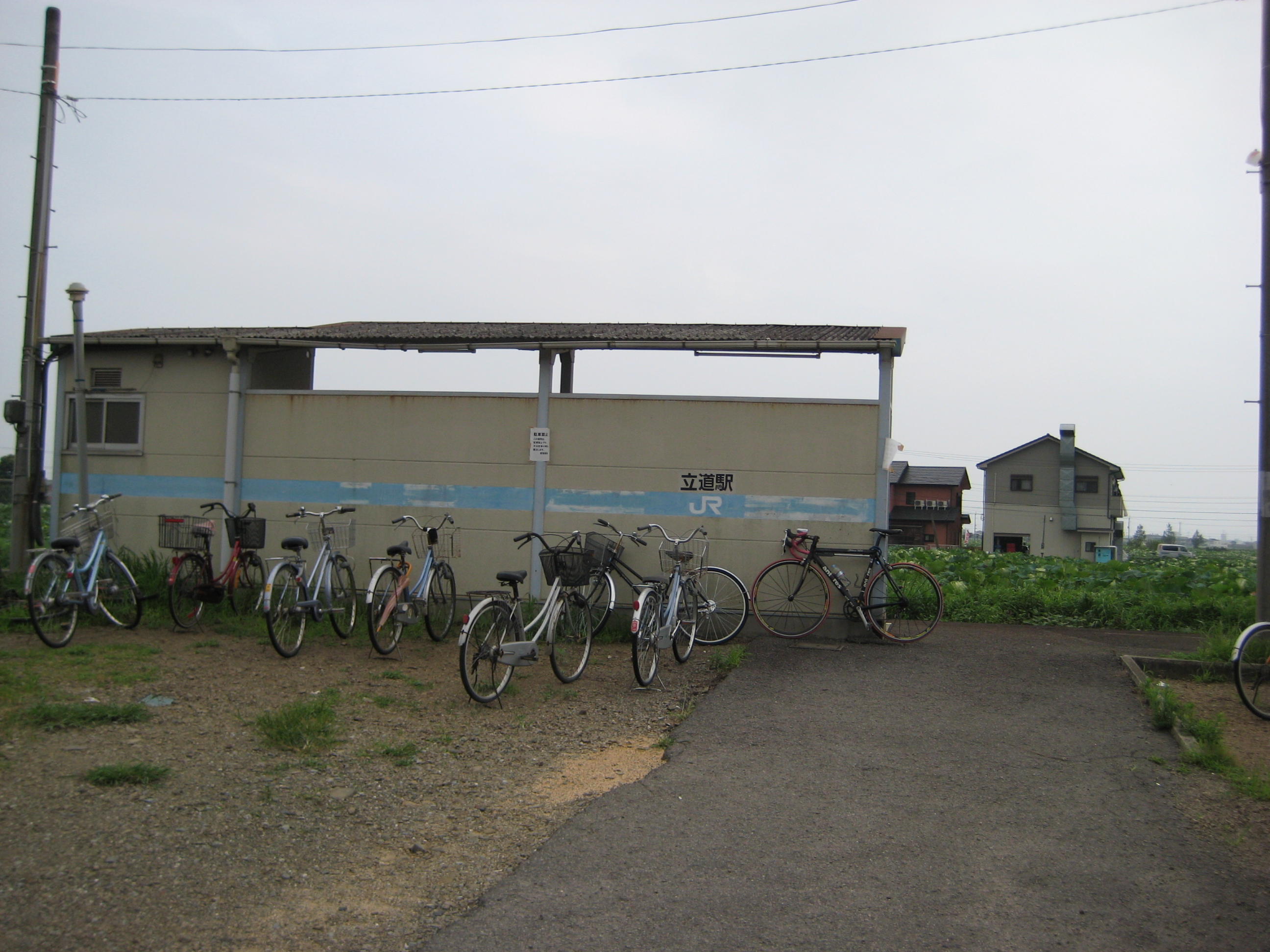

General information
- Location: Shinden Ōasachō Himeda, Naruto, Tokushima, Tokushima Prefecture 779-0301; Japan
- Coordinates: 34°09′44″N 134°33′28″E
- Operator: JR Shikoku
- Line: Naruto Line
- Distance: 3.0 km (1.9 mi) from Ikenotani
- Platforms: 1 side platform
- Tracks: 1

Construction
- Structure type: At grade
- Accessible: Yes - ramp leads up to platform

Other information
- Status: Unstaffed
- Station code: N06

History
- Opened: 1 July 1916; 110 years ago

Passengers
- FY2019: 58

Services
| Preceding station | JR Shikoku | Following station |
|---|---|---|
| Awa-Ōtani N05 towards Ikenotani | Naruto Line | Kyōkaimae N07 towards Naruto |
Location
- Location within Tokushima Prefecture Location within Japan

Tatsumichi Station (立道駅, Tatsumichi-eki) is a passenger railway station located in the city of Naruto, Tokushima Prefecture, Japan. It is operated by JR Shikoku and has the station number "N06".

== Lines ==
Tatsumichi Station is served by the JR Shikoku Naruto Line and is located 3.0 km from the beginning of the line at Ikenotani. Only local services stop at the station.

== Layout ==
The station, which is unstaffed, consists of a side platform serving a single track. There is no station building, only a shelter on the platform. A ramp leads up to the platform from the access road.

== History ==
Tatsumichi Station was opened by the privately run Awa Electric Railway (later the Awa Railway) on 1 July 1916 . After the Awa Railway was nationalized on 1 July 1933, Japanese Government Railways (JGR) took over control of the station and operated it as part of the Awa Line. On 20 March 1935, after some other stations on the line were absorbed into the Kōtoku Main Line, Tatsumichi became part of the Muya Line. On 1 March 1956, the line was renamed as the Naruto Line. On 1 April 1987, with the privatization of Japanese National Railways (JNR), the successor of JGR, the station came under the control of JR Shikoku.

== Passenger statistics ==
In fiscal 2019, the station was used by an average of 58 passengers daily

== Surrounding area ==
- Takamatsu Expressway

== See also ==
- List of railway stations in Japan
