= Awa-Ōtani Station =

Railway station in Naruto, Tokushima Prefecture, Japan

N05 Awa-Ōtani Station 阿波大谷駅
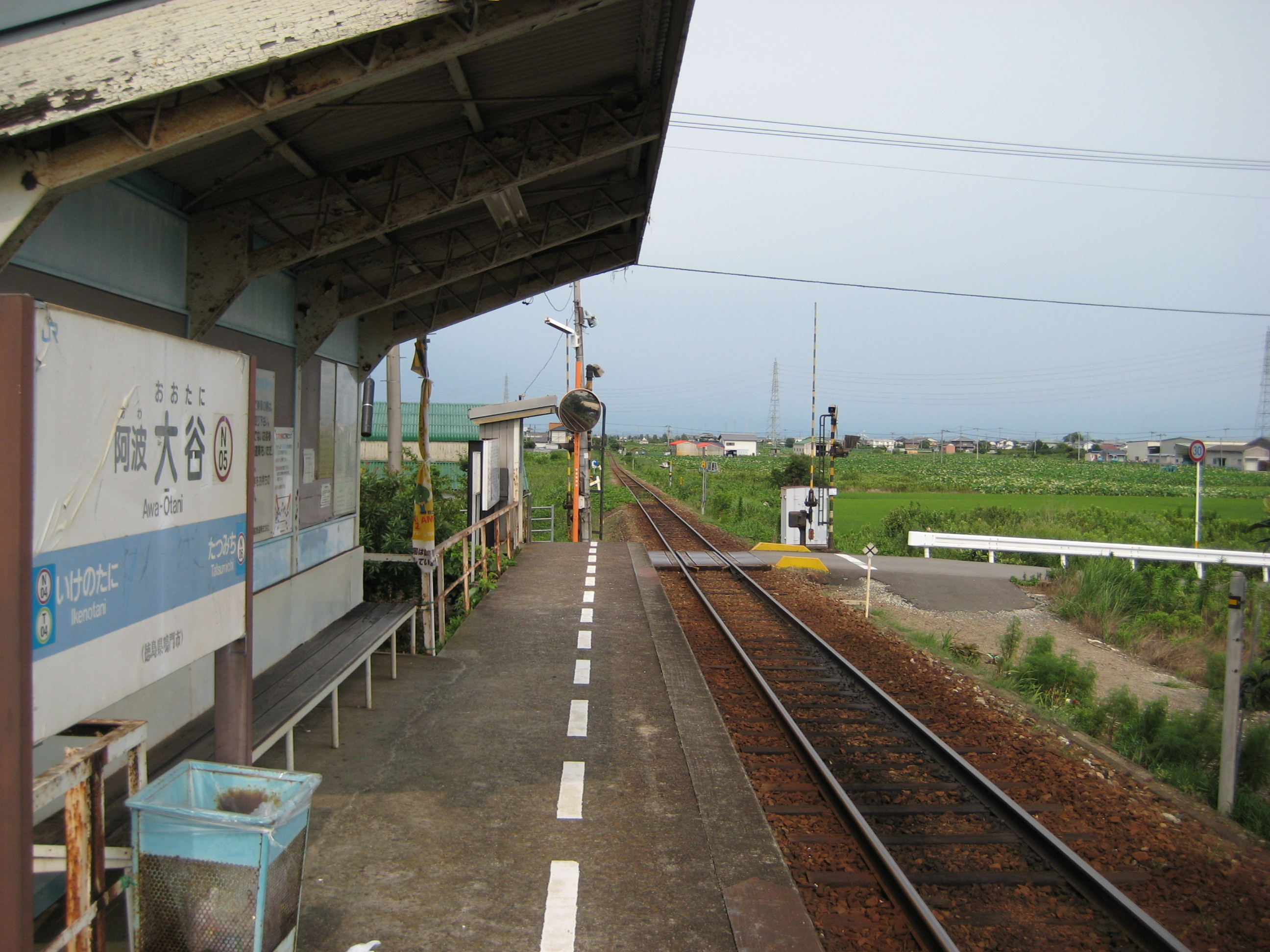
- Awa-Ōtani Station platform

General information
- Location: Maeba Ōasachō Ōtani, Naruto City, Tokushima Prefecture 779-0302; Japan
- Coordinates: 34°09′29″N 134°32′25″E
- Operator: JR Shikoku
- Line: Naruto Line
- Distance: 1.3 km (0.81 mi) from Ikenotani
- Platforms: 1 side platform
- Tracks: 1

Construction
- Structure type: At grade

Other information
- Status: Unstaffed
- Station code: N05

History
- Opened: 15 April 1961; 65 years ago

Passengers
- FY2019: 84

Services
Preceding station	JR Shikoku	Following station
Ikenotani N04 Terminus	Naruto Line	Tatsumichi N06 towards Naruto
Location
- Location within Tokushima Prefecture Location within Japan

Awa-Ōtani Station (阿波大谷駅, Awa-Ōtani-eki) is a passenger railway station in the city of Naruto, Tokushima Prefecture, Japan. It is operated by JR Shikoku and has the station number "N05".

== Lines ==
The station is served by the JR Shikoku Naruto Line and is located 1.3 km from the beginning of the line at Ikenotani. Only local services stop at the station.

== Layout ==
The station, which is unstaffed, consists of a side platform serving a single track. There is no station building, only a shelter on the platform. A ramp leads up to the platform from the access road.

== History ==
Japanese National Railways (JNR) opened the station on 15 April 1961 as an added station on the existing Naruto Line. With the privatization of JNR on 1 April 1987, control of the station passed to JR Shikoku.

== Passenger statistics ==
In fiscal 2019, the station was used by an average of 84 passengers daily

== Surrounding area ==
- Ōtani ware kilns
- Horiekita Elementary School, Naruto City
- Emperor Tsuchimikado cremation spot

== See also ==
- List of railway stations in Japan
