= Awa-Kawabata Station =

Japanese train station

T06 Awa-Kawabata Station 阿波川端駅
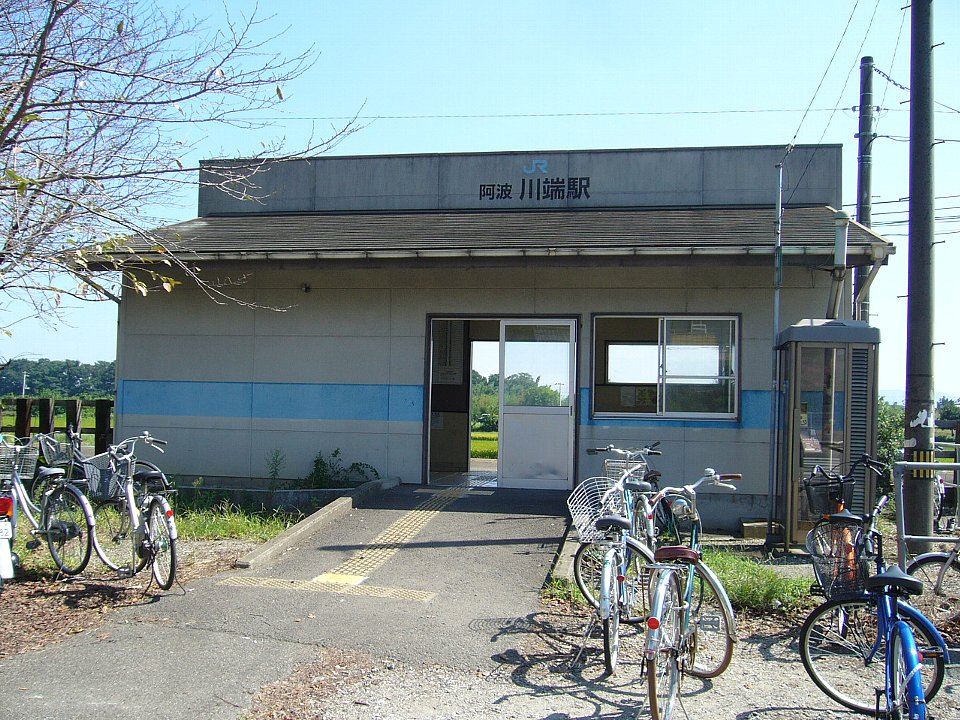
- Awa-Kawabata Station in September 2006

General information
- Location: Nakatsubo Kawabata, Itano Town, Itano District, Tokushima Prefecture 779-0102; Japan
- Coordinates: 34°08′55″N 134°29′01″E
- Operator: JR Shikoku
- Line: Kōtoku Line
- Distance: 59.8 km (37.2 mi) from Takamatsu
- Platforms: 1 side platform
- Tracks: 1

Construction
- Structure type: At grade
- Accessible: Yes - station building and platform accessed by ramp

Other information
- Status: Unstaffed
- Station code: T06

History
- Opened: 15 July 1927; 99 years ago

Passengers
- FY2019: 154

Services
Preceding station	JR Shikoku	Following station
Itano T07 towards Takamatsu	Kōtoku Line	Bandō T05 towards Tokushima
Uzushio does not stop here
Location
- Location within Tokushima Prefecture Location within Japan

Awa-Kawabata Station (阿波川端駅, Awa-Kawabata-eki) is a passenger railway station located in the town of Itano, Itano District, Tokushima Prefecture, Japan. It is operated by JR Shikoku and has the station number "T06".

== Lines ==
Awa-Kawabata Station is served by the JR Shikoku Kōtoku Line and is located 59.8 km from the beginning of the line at Takamatsu. Only local services stop at the station.

== Layout ==
The station consists of a side platform serving a single track. The station building is unstaffed and serves only as a waiting room.

== History ==
Awa-Kawabata Station was opened by the privately run Awa Railway as Kawabata Stop on 15 July 1927. After the Awa Railway was nationalized on 1 July 1933, Japanese Government Railways (JGR) took over control of the station. It was renamed Awa-Kawabata Station and was operated as part of the Awa Line. On 20 March 1935, the station became part of the Kōtoku Main Line. With the privatization of JNR (the successor of JGR) on 1 April 1987, control of the station passed to JR Shikoku.

== Passenger statistics ==
In fiscal 2019, the station was used by an average of 154 passengers daily

== Surrounding area ==
- Takamatsu Expressway Itano Interchange
- Kawabata Community Center
- Gokuraku-ji

== See also ==
- List of railway stations in Japan
