= Muya Station =

Railway station in Naruto, Tokushima Prefecture, Japan

N09 Muya Station 撫養駅
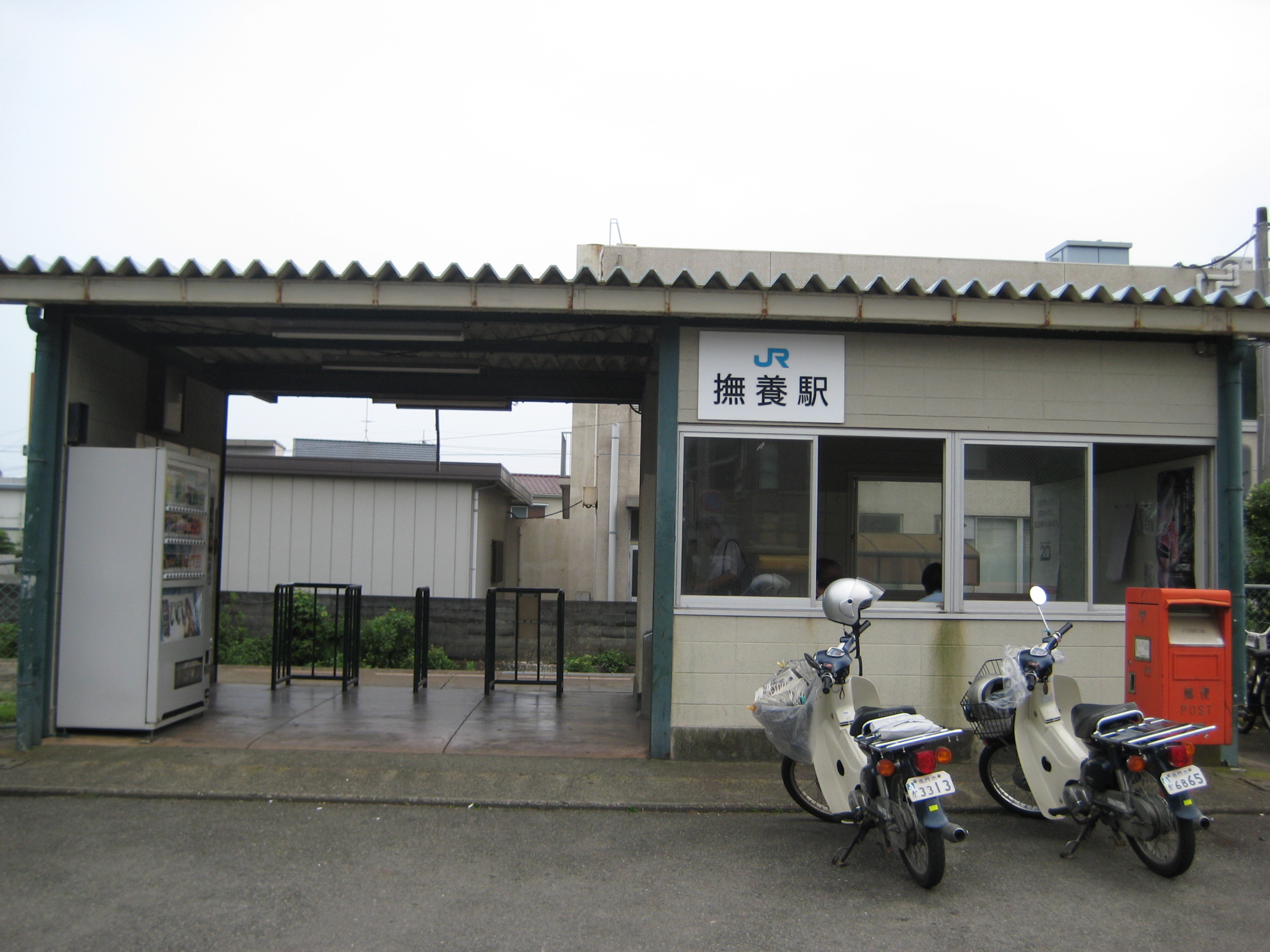

General information
- Location: Gongen Muyachō Minamihama, Naruto City, Tokushima Prefecture 772-0003; Japan
- Coordinates: 34°10′23″N 134°36′04″E
- Operator: JR Shikoku
- Line: Naruto Line
- Distance: 7.2 km (4.5 mi) from Ikenotani
- Platforms: 1 side platform
- Tracks: 1

Construction
- Structure type: At grade
- Accessible: Yes - platform at same level as access road

Other information
- Status: Unstaffed
- Station code: N09

History
- Opened: 1 July 1916; 110 years ago
- Former names: Ebisumae (between 18 January 1928 and 1 August 1948)

Passengers
- FY2019: 492

Services
Preceding station	JR Shikoku	Following station
Konpiramae N08 towards Ikenotani	Naruto Line	Naruto N10 Terminus
Location
- Location within Tokushima Prefecture Location within Japan

Muya Station (撫養駅, Muya-eki) is a passenger railway station located in the city of Naruto, Tokushima Prefecture, Japan. It is operated by JR Shikoku and has the station number "N09".

== Lines ==
Muya Station is served by the JR Shikoku Naruto Line and is located 7.2 km from the beginning of the line at Ikenotani. Only local services stop at the station.

== Layout ==
The station, which is unstaffed, consists of a side platform serving a single track. A simple station building serves as a waiting room. The platform is at the same level as the access road and may be entered without the need for a ramp or steps.

== History ==
Muya Station was opened by the privately run Awa Electric Railway (later the Awa Railway) on 1 July 1916 as the terminus of their line from Ikenotani. On 18 January 1928, the line was extended to a new terminus further northeast. The new terminus (the present Naruto took over the name Muya and this station was renamed Ebisumae Station (ゑびす前駅, Ebisumae-eki). After the Awa Railway was nationalized on 1 July 1933, Japanese Government Railways (JGR) took over control of the station. The kanji name was changed to 蛭子前駅 which still read as Ebisumae-eki. JGR operated the station as part of the Awa Line until 20 March 1935 when some other stations on the line were absorbed into the Kōtoku Main Line. Ebisumae then became part of the Muya Line. On 1 August 1948, the terminus at Muya was renamed Naruto and Ebisumae regained the name Muya. On 1 March 1956, the line which served the station was renamed the Naruto Line. On 1 April 1987, with the privatization of Japanese National Railways (JNR), the successor of JGR, the station came under the control of JR Shikoku.

== Passenger statistics ==
In fiscal 2019, the station was used by an average of 492 passengers daily

== Surrounding area ==
- Kotoshironushi Shrine
- Tokushima Prefectural Naruto Uzushio High School Naruto Campus (former Tokushima Prefectural Naruto Daiichi High School)
- Naruto City Daiichi Junior High School

== See also ==
- List of railway stations in Japan
