= Ōtsuka Museum of Art =

Coordinates: 34°13′56.8″N 134°38′15.6″E

- 大塚国際美術館; Ōtsuka Kokusai Bijutsukan
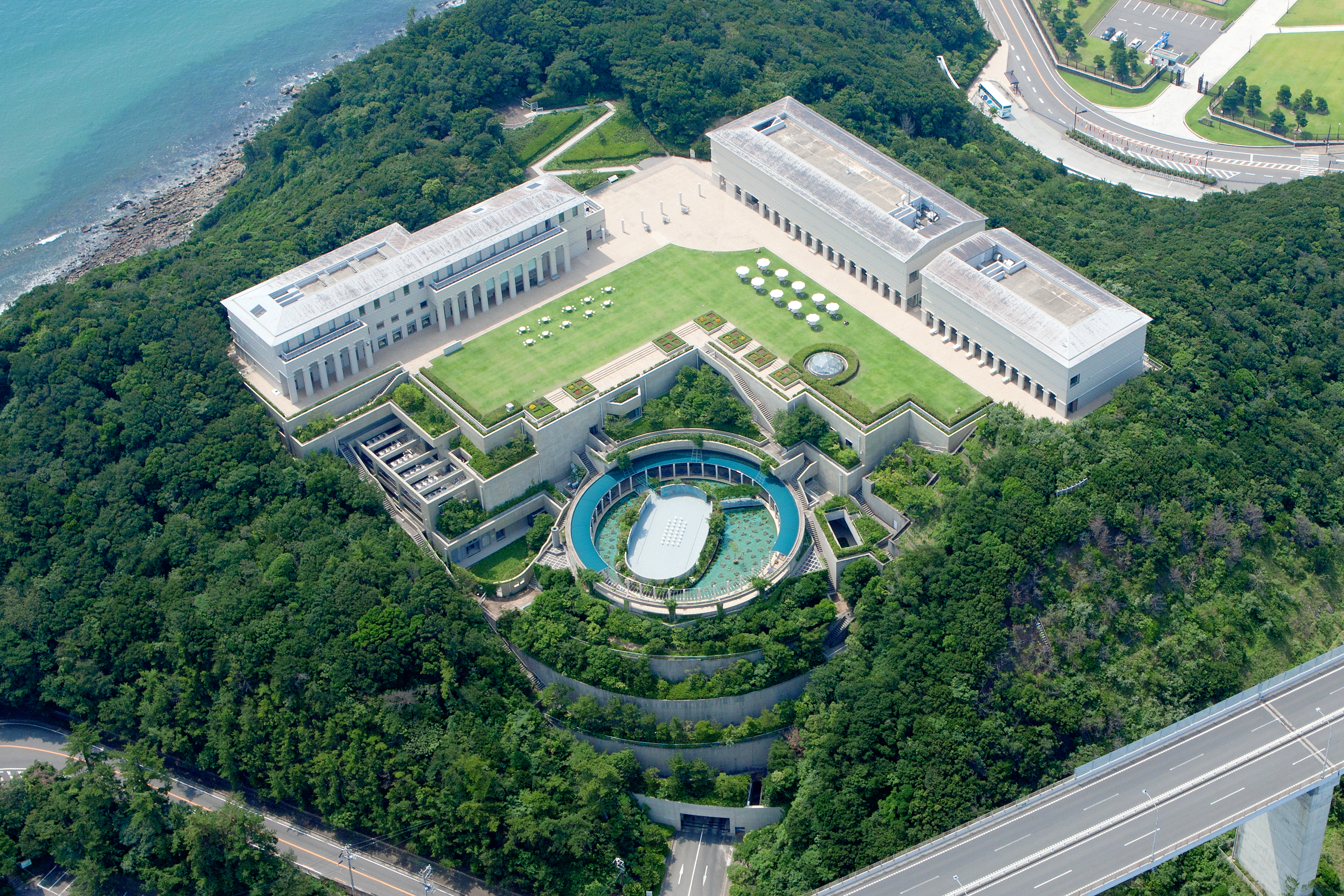
- The museum in 2014
- Established: 1998
- Location: Naruto, Tokushima Prefecture, Japan
- Type: Art museum
- Collections: Full-size ceramic reproductions of noted artworks
- Collection size: >1,000
- Website: o-museum.or.jp

The Ōtsuka Museum of Art (大塚国際美術館, Ōtsuka Kokusai Bijutsukan) in Naruto, Tokushima Prefecture is an art museum founded in 1998 and is one of the largest exhibition spaces in Japan.

Established by Otsuka Pharmaceutical as a celebration of its 75th anniversary, it houses over a thousand full-size ceramic reproductions of major works of art, including the Sistine Chapel, Scrovegni Chapel, triclinium of the Villa of the Mysteries, and Guernica. The works are transfer-printed from photographs before being fired and retouched. The purpose of this is to give Japanese people who cannot travel abroad the opportunity to see these famous pieces. A robot named 'Mr Art' gives hour-long gallery talks. The museum cost industrialist Masahito Ōtsuka $400,000,000.

== Gallery ==
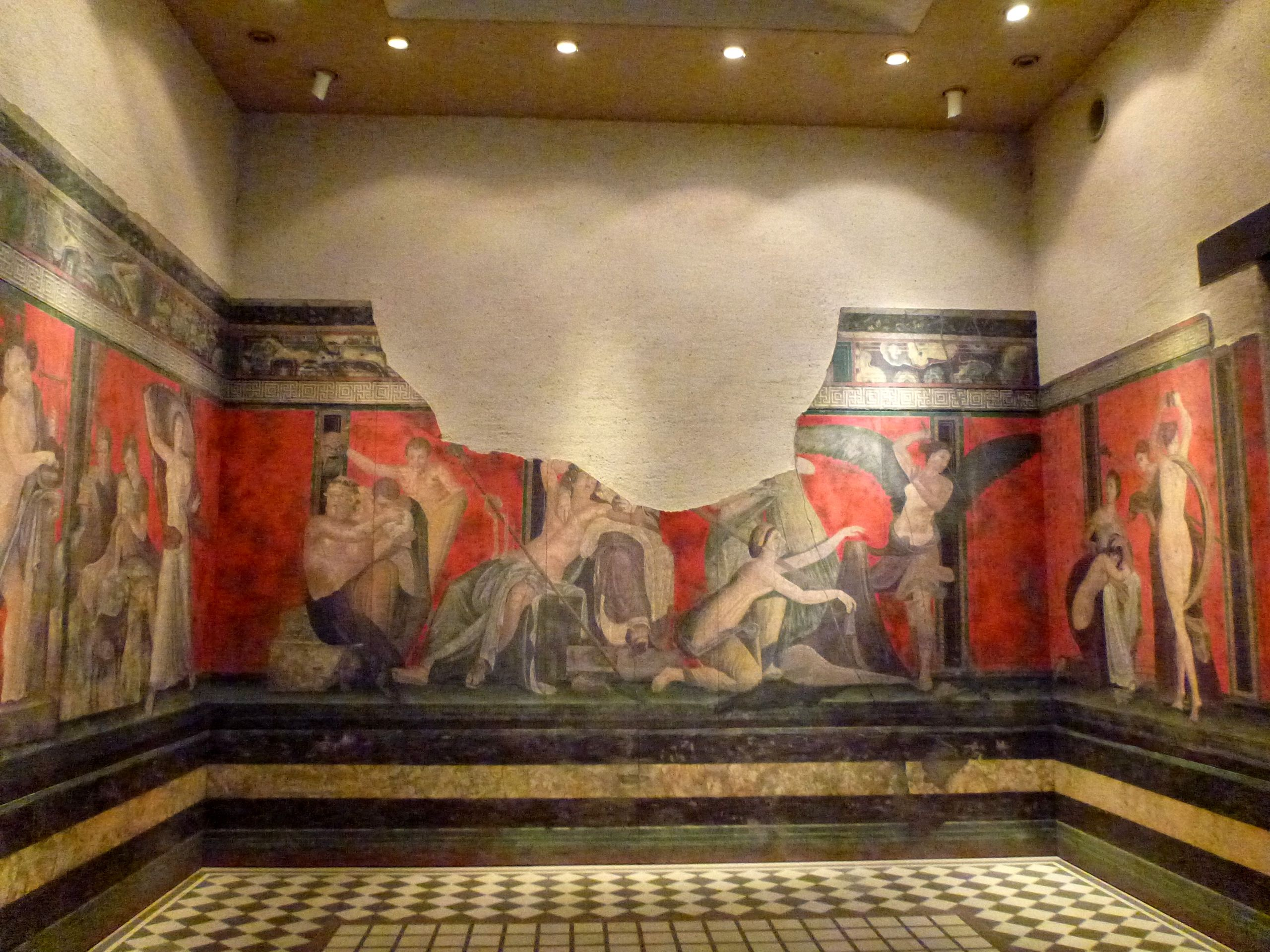
Otsuka Museum of Art, Tokushima

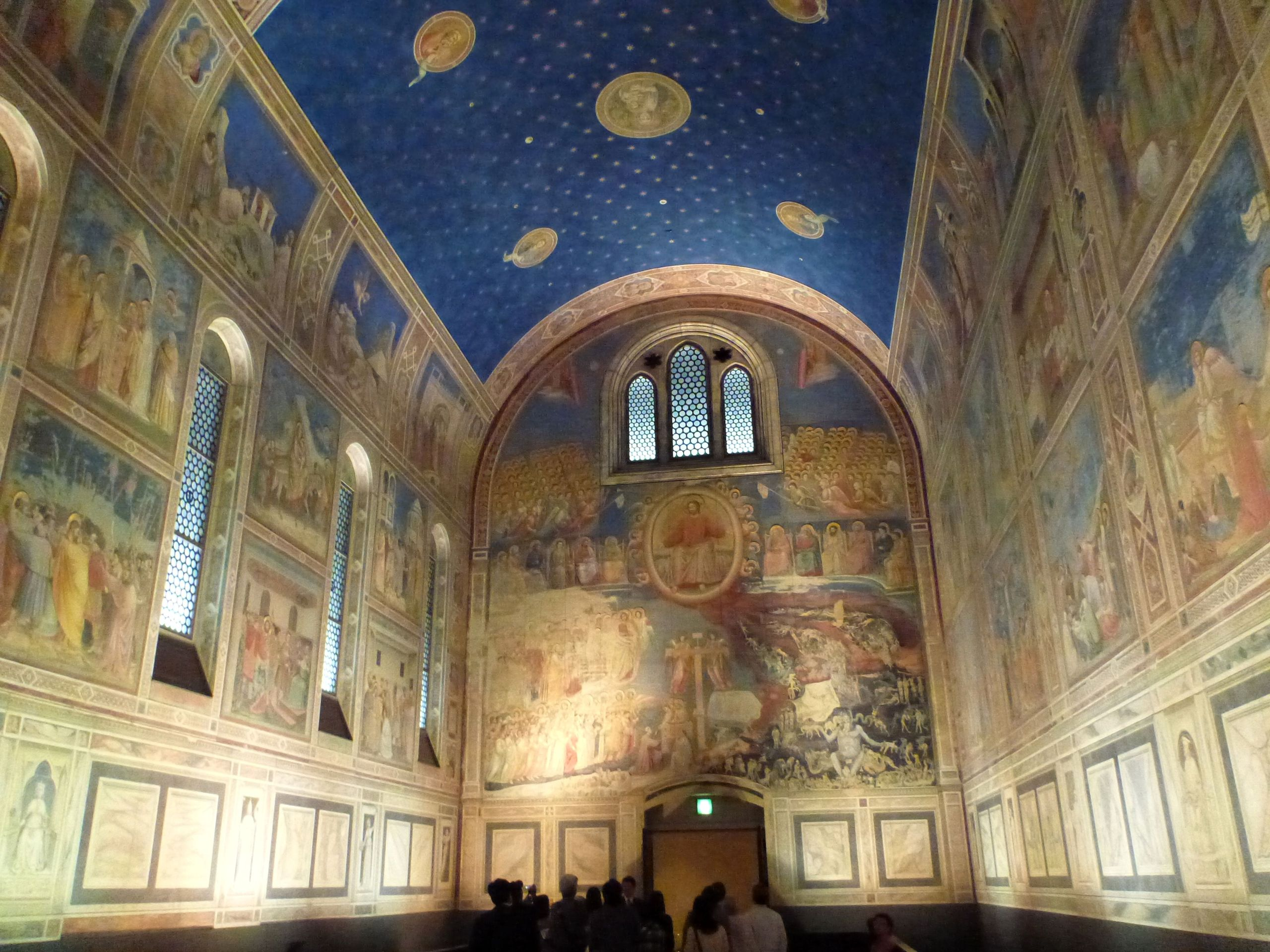
Otsuka Museum of Art, Tokushima

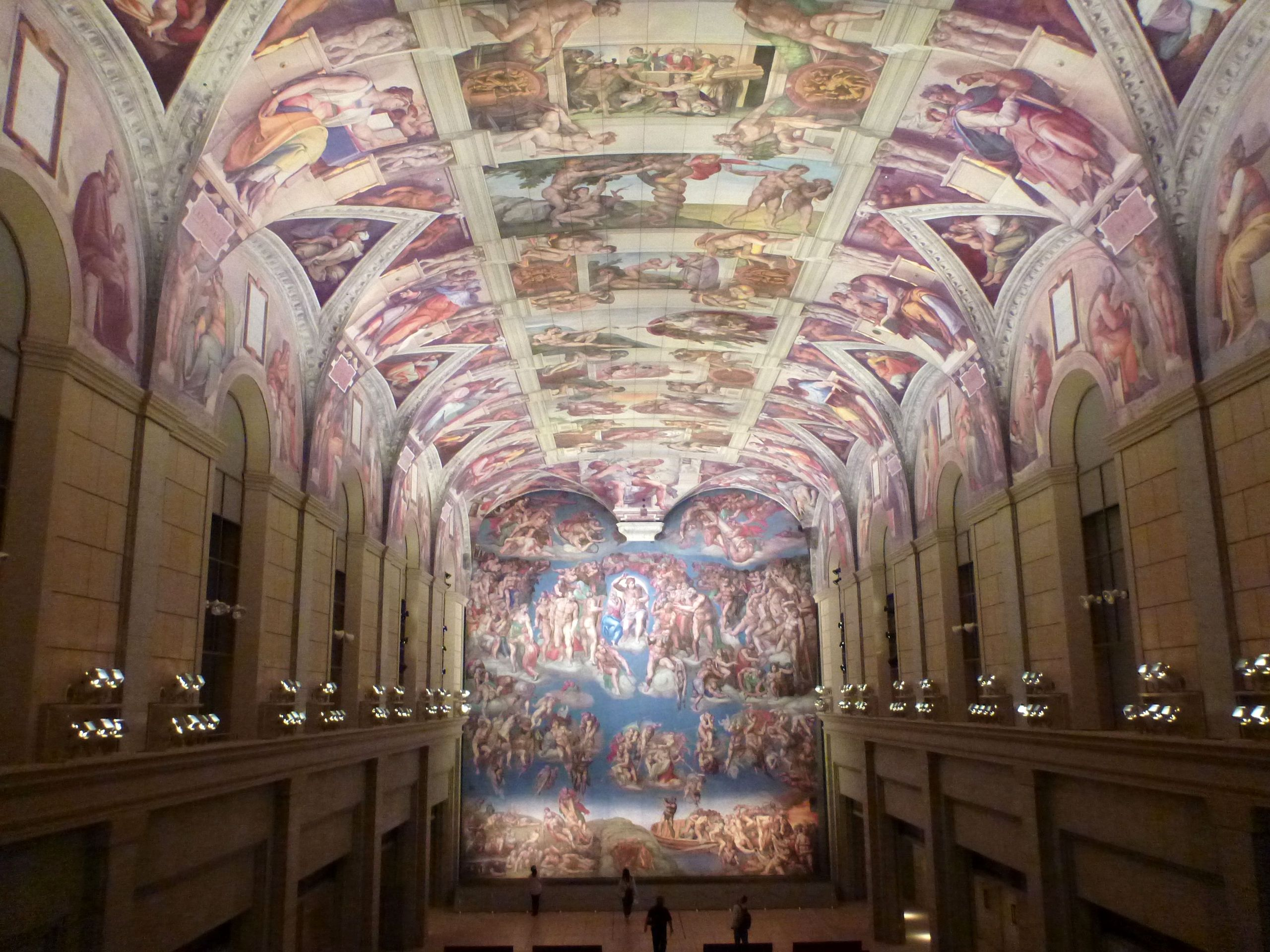
Reproduction of Sistine Chapel

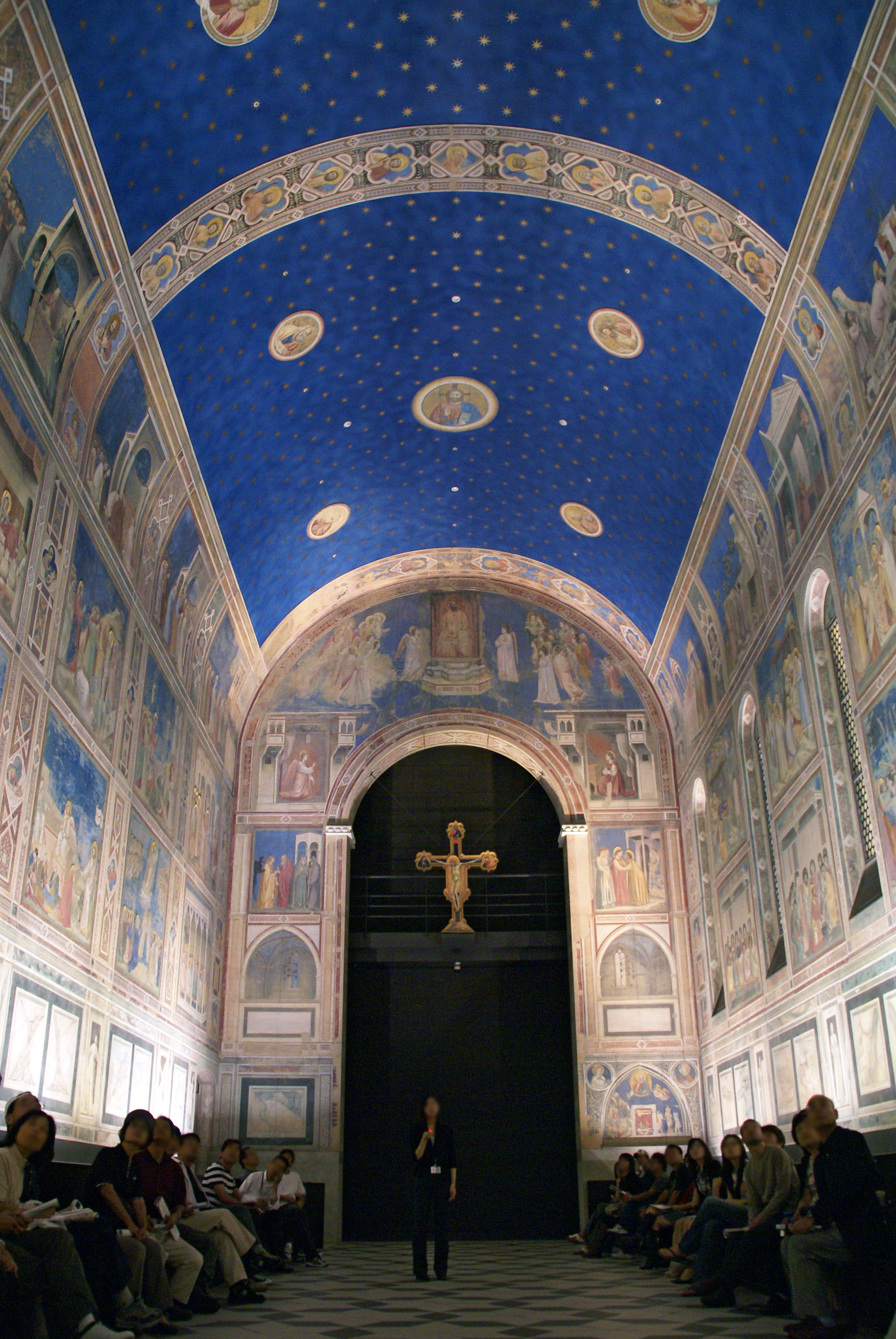
Full-size ceramic reproduction of the Scrovegni Chapel at the Ōtsuka Museum of Art

== See also ==
- The Work of Art in the Age of Mechanical Reproduction
