= Bandō Station =

Passenger railway station in Naruto, Tokushima, Japan

T05 Bandō Station 板東駅
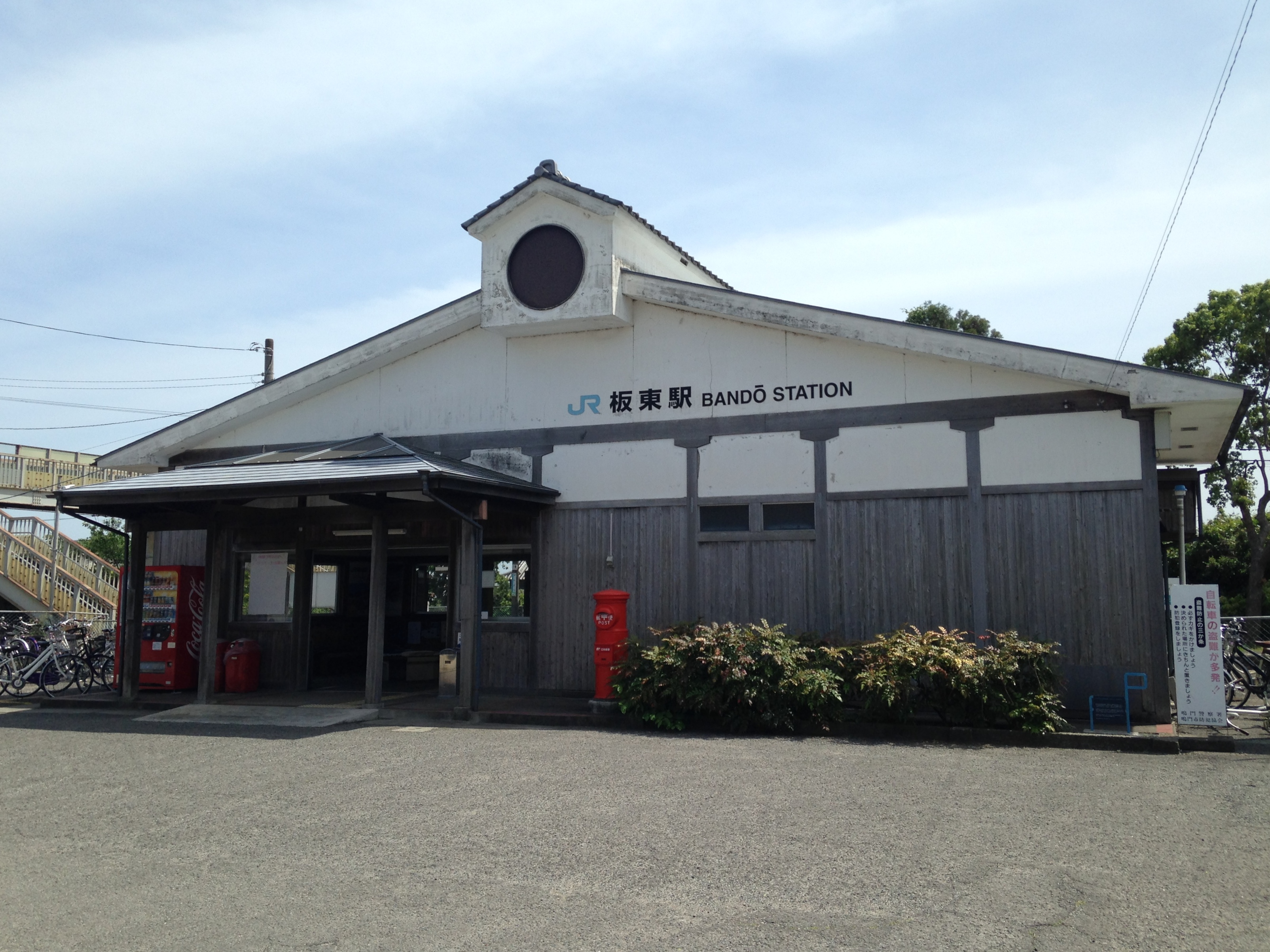
- Bandō Station, May 2016

General information
- Location: Tsujimidō Ōasachō Bandō, Naruto City, Tokushima Prefecture 779-0230; Japan
- Coordinates: 34°09′20″N 134°30′24″E
- Operator: JR Shikoku
- Line: Kōtoku Line
- Distance: 62.1 km (38.6 mi) from Takamatsu
- Platforms: 2 side platforms
- Tracks: 2

Construction
- Structure type: At grade
- Accessible: No - platforms linked by footbridge

Other information
- Status: Unstaffed
- Station code: T05

History
- Opened: 15 February 1923; 103 years ago

Passengers
- FY2019: 390

Services
Preceding station	JR Shikoku	Following station
Awa-Kawabata T06 towards Takamatsu	Kōtoku Line	Ikenotani T04 N04 towards Tokushima
Uzushio does not stop here
Location
- Location within Tokushima Prefecture Location within Japan

Bandō Station (板東駅, Bandō-eki) is a passenger railway station located in the city of Naruto, Tokushima, Japan. It is operated by JR Shikoku and has the station number "T05". It is the station closest to Ryōzen-ji, the first temple of the Shikoku 88 temple pilgrimage.

== Lines ==
Bandō Station is served by the JR Shikoku Kōtoku Line and is located 62.1 km from the beginning of the line at Takamatsu. Only local services stop at the station.

== Layout ==
The station consists of two side platforms serving two tracks. The station building is unstaffed and serves only as a waiting room. Access to the opposite platform is by means of a footbridge.

=== Platforms ===
1	Kōtoku Line	for Tokushima and Anan
2	Kōtoku Line	for Itano and Takamatsu

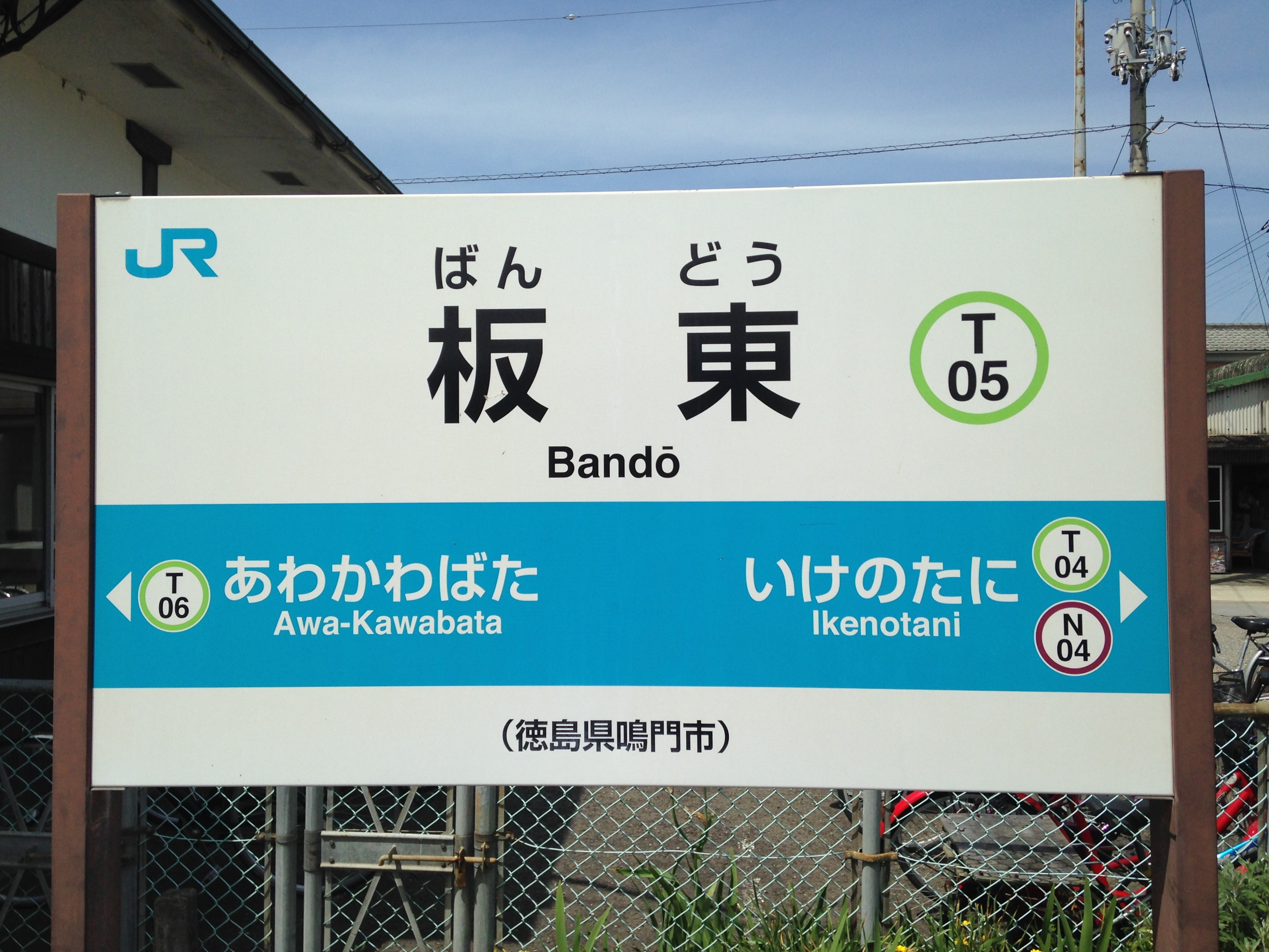
Station sign

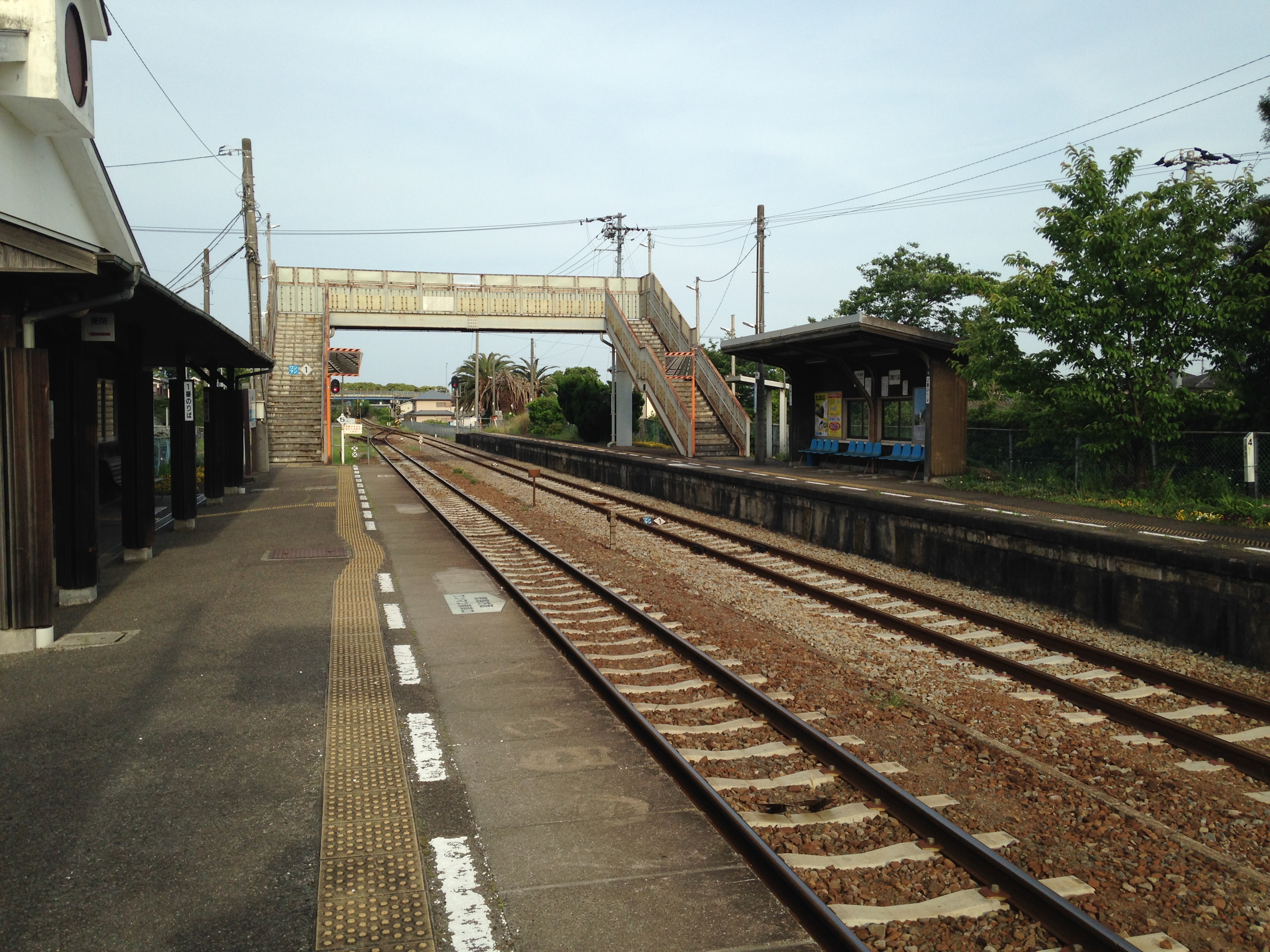
A view of the platforms and tracks at Bandō.

== History ==
Bandō Station opened by the privately run Awa Electric Railway (later the Awa Railway) on 15 February 1923. After the Awa Railway was nationalized on 1 July 1933, Japanese Government Railways (JGR) took over control of the station and operated it as part of the Awa Line. On 20 March 1935, the station became part of the Kōtoku Main Line. With the privatization of JNR on 1 April 1987, the station came under the control of JR Shikoku.

== Passenger statistics ==
In fiscal 2019, the station was used by an average of 390 passengers daily

== Surrounding area ==
- Naruto City Hall Bando Liaison Office
- Naruto City Bando Elementary School
- Bandō prisoner-of-war camp, National Historic Site
- Ryōzen-ji

== See also ==
- List of railway stations in Japan
