= Gokuraku-ji (Naruto) =

Shingon temple in Naruto, Japan

Coordinates: 34°09′20″N 134°29′25″E

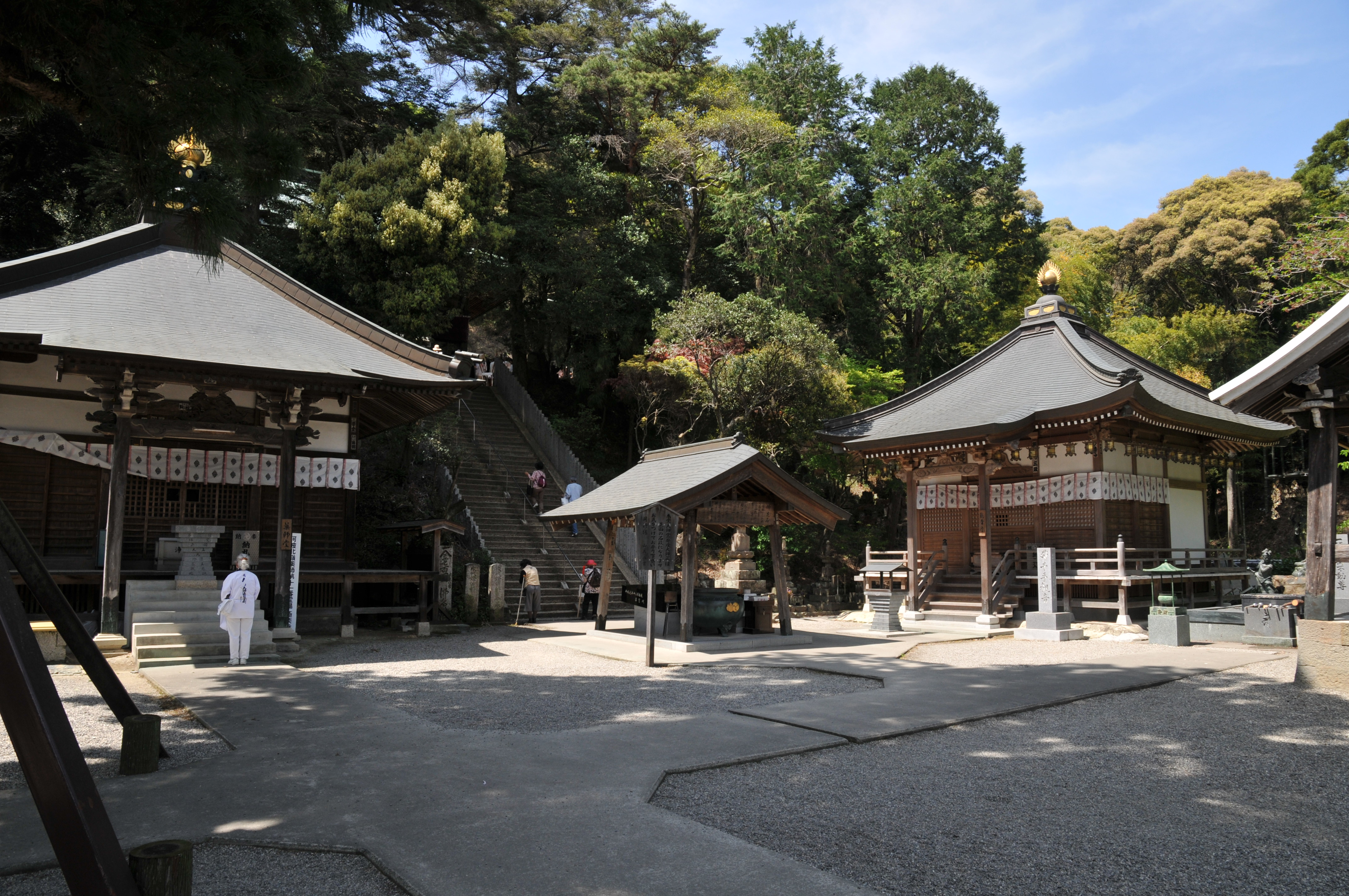
Gokuraku-ji

Gokuraku-ji (極楽寺) is a Kōya-san Shingon temple in Naruto, Tokushima Prefecture, Japan. Temple 2 of the Shikoku 88 temple pilgrimage, the main image is of Amida Nyorai. The temple is said to have been founded by Gyōki.

== Treasures ==
- Heian period seated wooden statue of Amida Nyorai (Important Cultural Property)
- Mandala of the Two Realms (Prefectural Cultural Property)
- Cryptomeria said to have been planted by Kōbō Daishi (City Cultural Property)

== See also ==
- Shikoku 88 temple pilgrimage
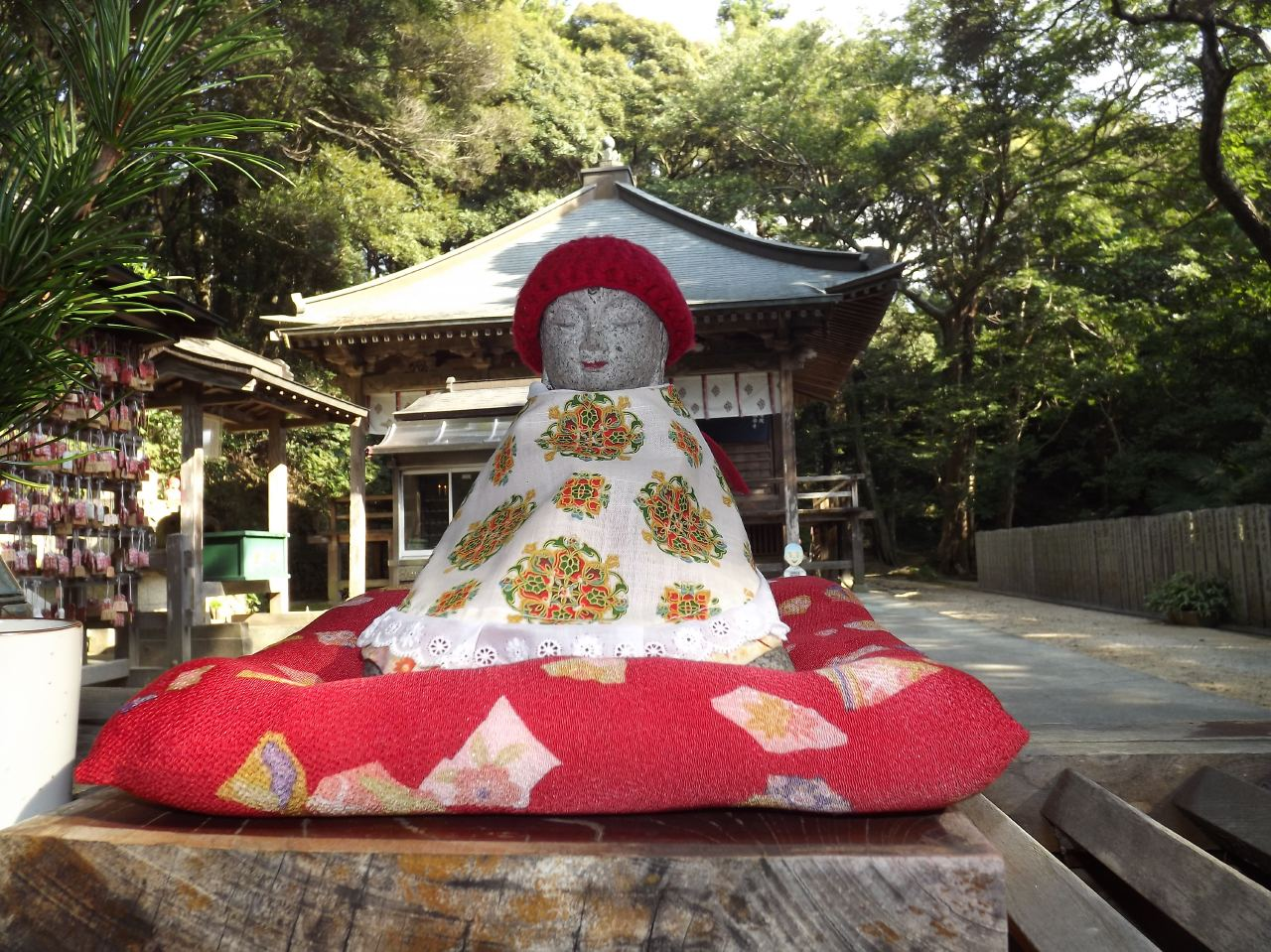

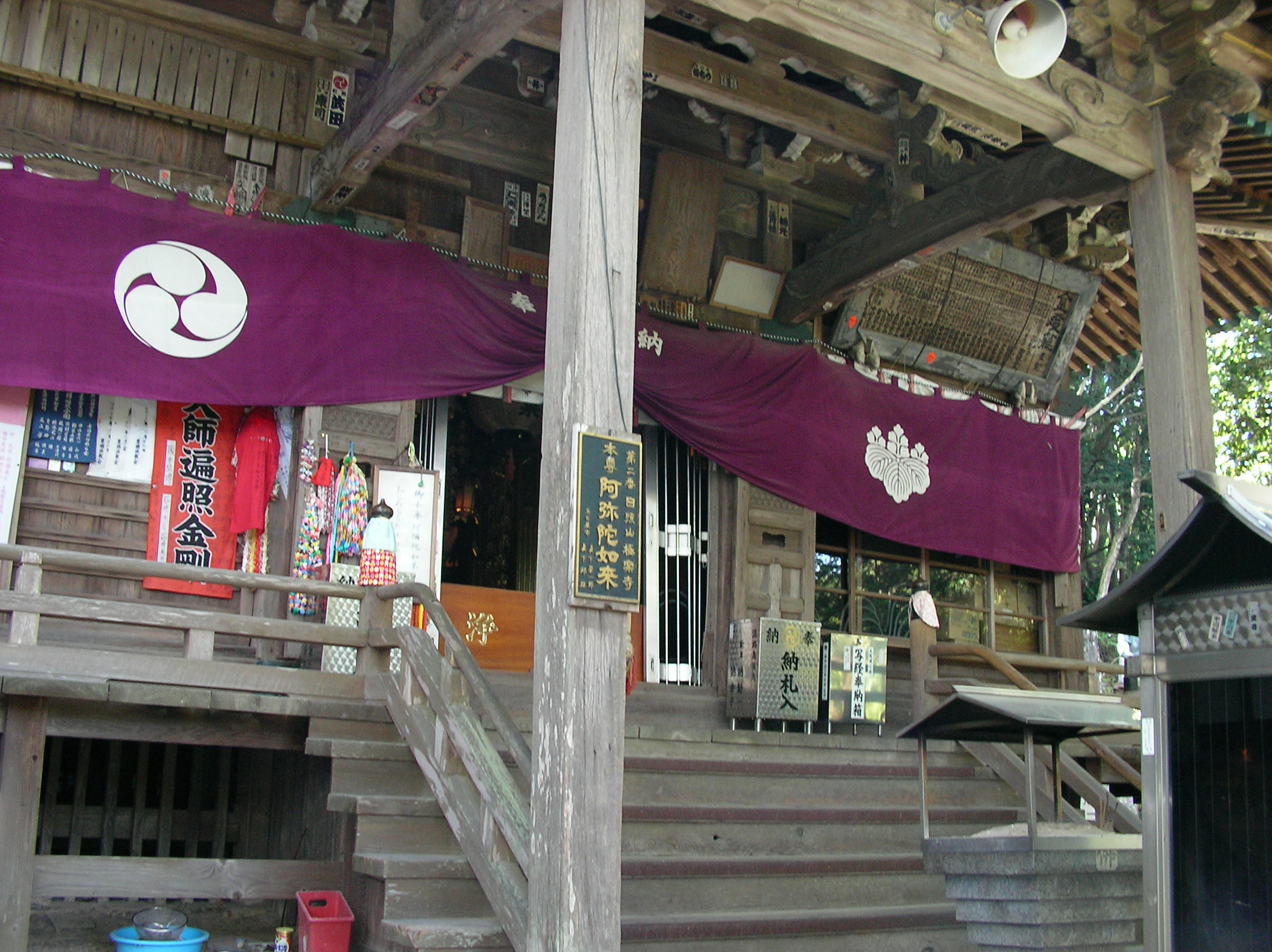
