= Naruto University of Education =

Higher education institution in Tokushima Prefecture, Japan

Coordinates: 34°12′9″N 134°36′19″E

- 鳴門教育大学; Naruto Kyōiku Daigaku
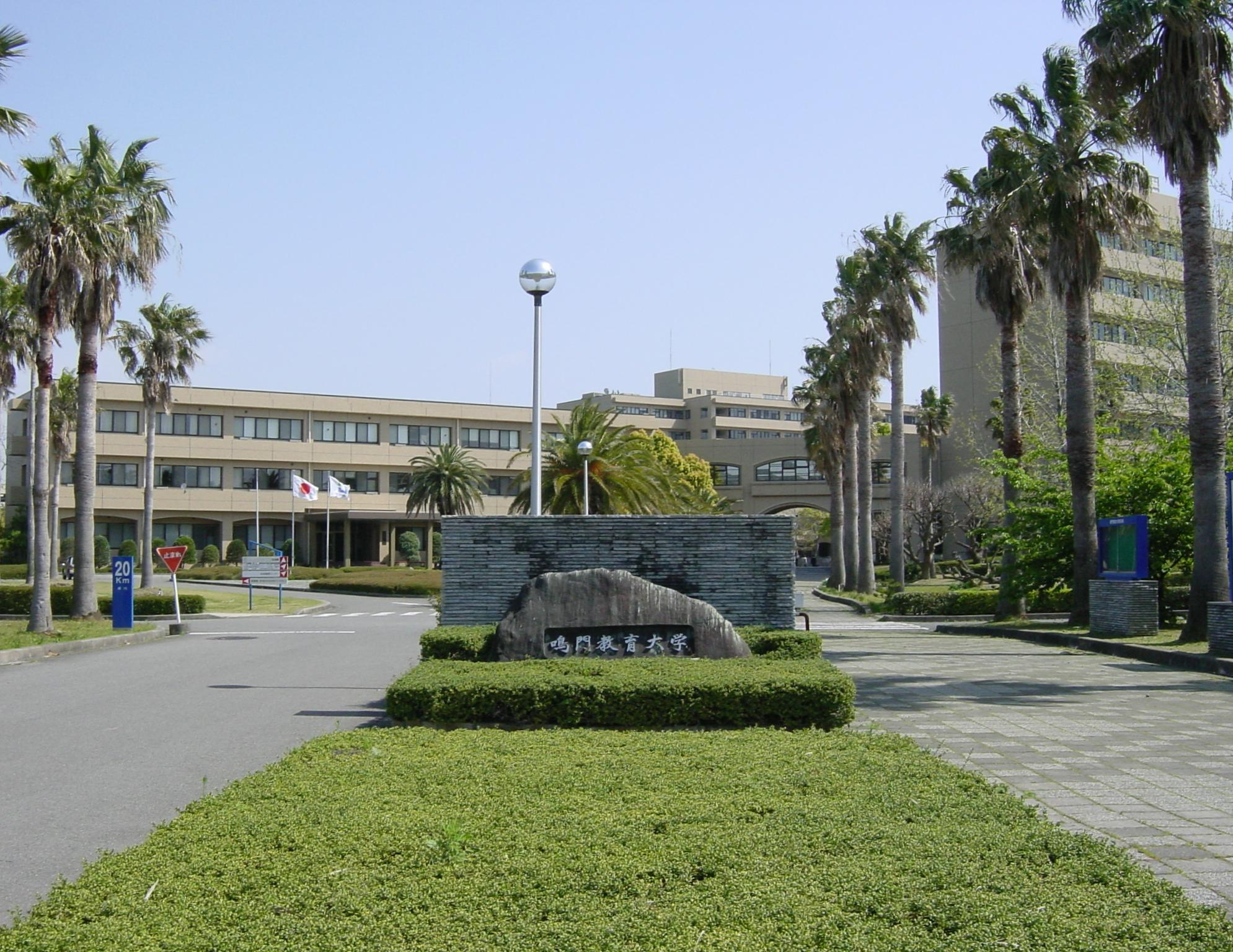
- Type: National
- Established: 1981
- Location: Naruto, Tokushima, Japan
- Website: http://www.naruto-u.ac.jp/

Naruto University of Education (鳴門教育大学, Naruto kyōiku daigaku) is a national university in Japan. It is located in Naruto, Tokushima on the island of Shikoku. The current president is Kazuo Yamashita. The school employs around 160 professors.
