= Naruto, Tokushima =

Naruto 鳴門市
- City
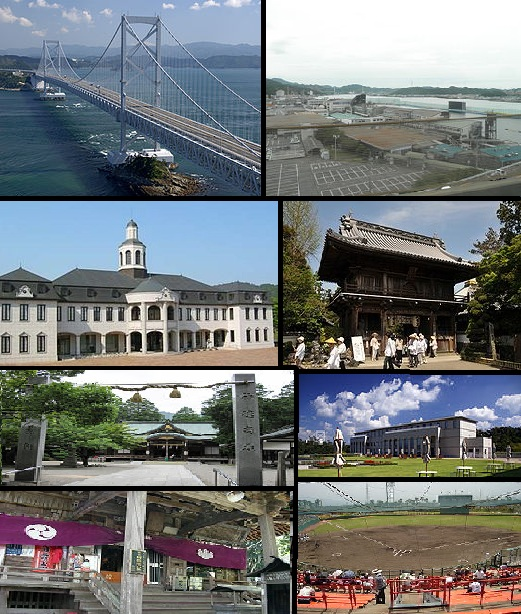
- Naruto City Montage

- Flag Seal

- Location of Naruto in Tokushima Prefecture

- Coordinates: 34°10′N 134°37′E
- Country: Japan
- Region: Shikoku
- Prefecture: Tokushima

Government
  - Mayor: Michihiko Izumi (from November 2009)

Area
  - Total: 135.66 km^{2} (52.38 sq mi)

Population (June 30, 2022)
  - Total: 54,989
  - Density: 405.34/km^{2} (1,049.8/sq mi)
- Time zone: UTC+9 (Japan Standard Time)
- Tree: Ilex integra
- Flower: Hamabō (Hibiscus hamabo)
- Phone number: 088-684-1111
- Address: 170 Muyachō Minamihama Higashihama, Naruto-shi, Tokushima-ken; 772-8501
- Website: Official website

Naruto (鳴門市, Naruto-shi) is a city located in Tokushima Prefecture, Japan. As of 30 June 2022, the city had an estimated population of 54,989 in 26,206 households and a population density of 410 persons per km^{2}. The total area of the city is 191.11 square kilometres (73.79 sq mi).

== Geography ==
Naruto is located in the northeastern tip of Tokushima Prefecture on the island of Shikoku. It is bordered by the Seto Inland Sea to the north and the Kii Channel to the east and faces Awaji Island across the Naruto Strait, which is famous for its whirlpools. The city is located in the easternmost part of the Sanuki Mountains.

=== Neighbouring municipalities ===
Kagawa Prefecture

- Higashikagawa

Tokushima Prefecture

- Itano
- Kitajima
- Matsushige

=== Climate ===
Naruto has a humid subtropical climate (Köppen Cfa) characterized by warm summers and cool winters with light to no snowfall. The average annual temperature in Naruto is 16.2 °C. The average annual rainfall is 1637 mm with September as the wettest month. The temperatures are highest on average in August, at around 26.7 °C, and lowest in January, at around 6.3 °C. Due to the Seto Inland Sea climate, rainfall is low despite being in Tokushima Prefecture. On August 6, 1923, a temperature of 42.5 °C, which was the highest recorded temperature in Japan for many decades, was unofficially recorded in Naruto.

== Demographics ==
Per Japanese census data, the population of Naruto has remained relatively steady over the past 50 years. In the quinquennial census of June 1, 2019, the city had a population of 56,222 (2005: 63,200).

Historical population
Year	Pop.	±%
1920	50,574	—
1930	53,390	+5.6%
1940	52,084	−2.4%
1950	68,080	+30.7%
1960	62,827	−7.7%
1970	60,634	−3.5%
1980	63,423	+4.6%
1990	64,575	+1.8%
2000	64,620	+0.1%
2010	61,522	−4.8%

== History ==
As with all of Tokushima Prefecture, the area of Naruto was part of ancient Awa Province. During the Edo period, the area was part of the holdings of Tokushima Domain ruled by the Hachisuka clan from their seat at Tokushima Castle. The villages of Seto (瀬戸村), Naruto (鳴門村), Muya (撫養村), and Satoura (里浦村) were established within Itano District, Tokushima with the creation of the modern municipalities system on October 1, 1889. Seto became a town on November 1, 1938, Naruto on April 1, 1940, and Muya on March 15, 1947. The four municipalities merged on March 15, 1947, to form the city of Narunan (鳴南市), which was renamed Naruto two months later on May 15, 1947.

== Government ==
Naruto has a mayor-council form of government with a directly elected mayor and a unicameral city council of 22 members. Naruto contributes three members to the Tokushima Prefectural Assembly. In terms of national politics, the town is part of Tokushima 2nd district of the lower house of the Diet of Japan.

== Economy ==
Naruto has a mixed economy of agriculture, commercial fishing, food processing and pharmaceuticals. In the past, the salt industry was thriving. Naruto was the origin of the Otsuka Pharmaceutical Group and the Naruto Salt Industry, both of which still have a number of facilities in the city.

== Education ==
Naruto has 13 public elementary schools and five public middle schools operated by the city government and two public high schools operated by the Tokushima Prefectural Department of Education. The Naruto University of Education is located in the city.

== Transportation ==
=== Railway ===
Shikoku Railway Company – Kōtoku Line

- Ikenotani - Bandō

Shikoku Railway Company – Naruto Line

- Ikenotani - Awa-Ōtani - Tatsumichi - Kyōkaimae - Konpiramae - Muya - Naruto

=== Highways ===
- Tokushima Expressway
- Kobe-Awaji-Naruto Expressway
- National Route 11
- National Route 28

== Sister cities ==
- Lüneburg, Germany, since 1974
- Qingdao, China, friendship city since 1999
- Zhangjiajie, Hunan, China, friendship city since 2011
- Narayanganj, Bangladesh, since 2023

== Local attractions ==
- Bandō prisoner-of-war camp, National Historic Site
- Gokuraku-ji, 2nd temple on the Shikoku Pilgrimage
- Naruto whirlpools
- Ōasahiko Jinja, ichinomiya of Awa Province
- Ōnaruto Bridge
- Ōtsuka Museum of Art
- Ryōzen-ji, 1st temple on the Shikoku Pilgrimage
- Tōrin-in
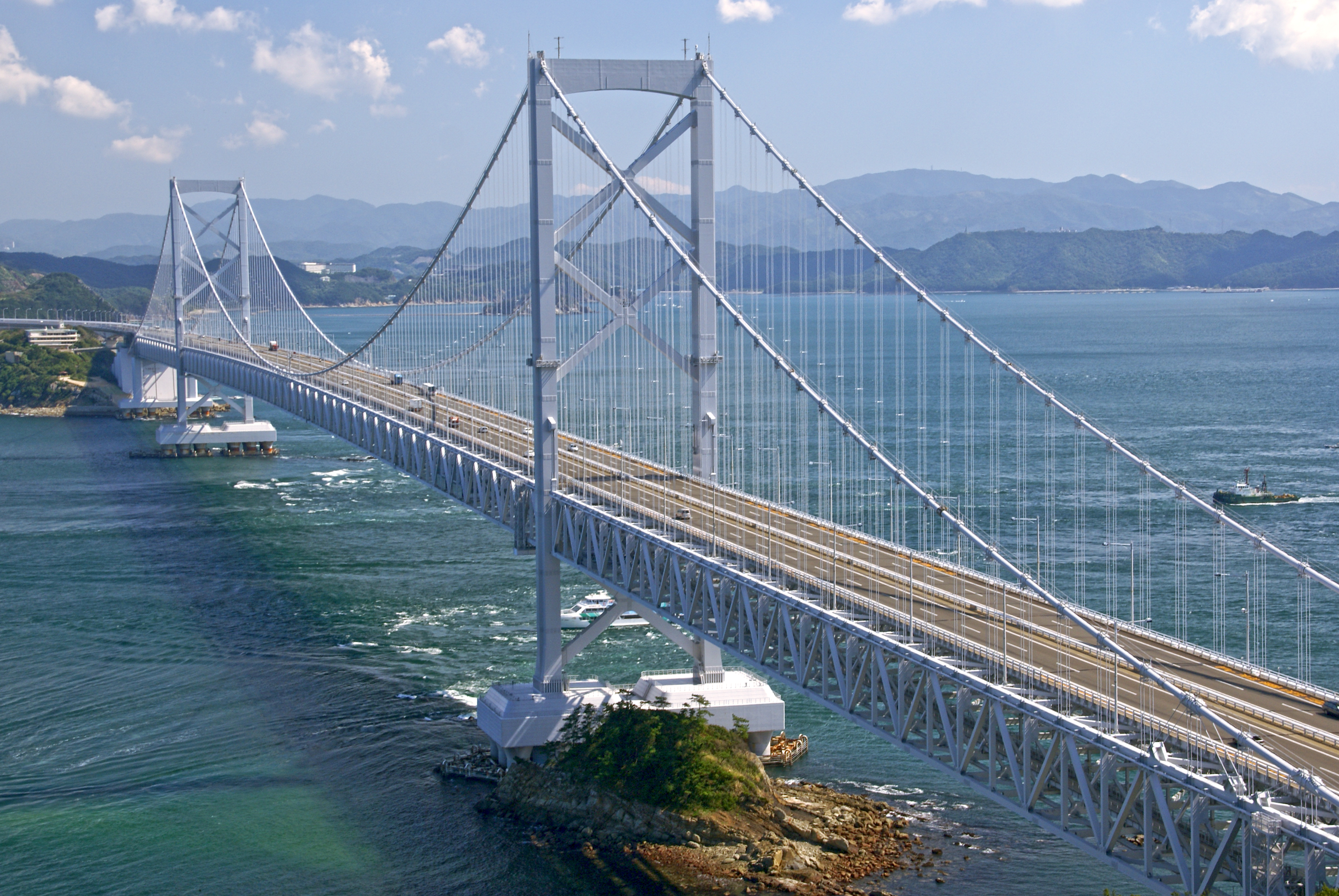
Ōnaruto Bridge

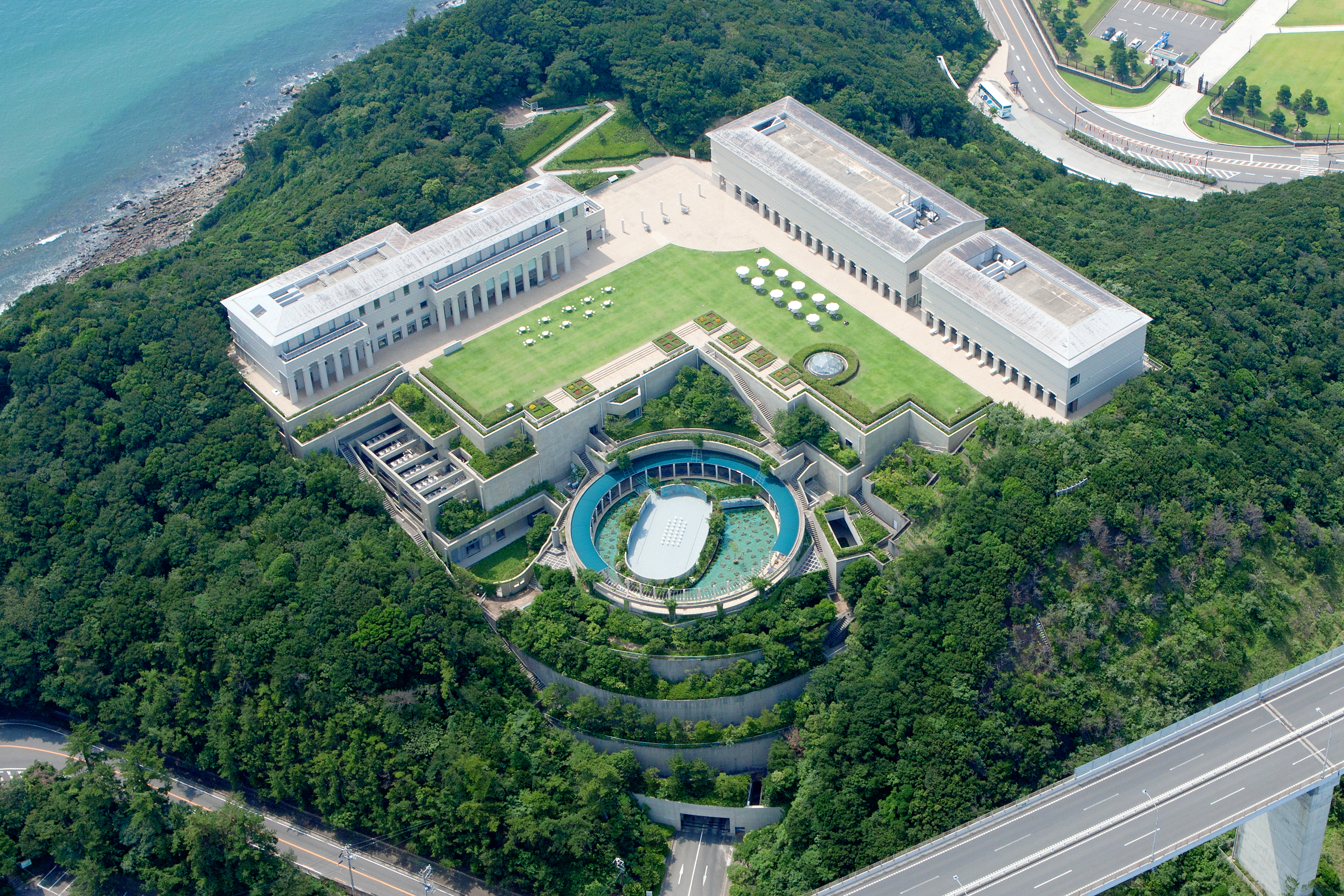
Ōtsuka Museum of Art

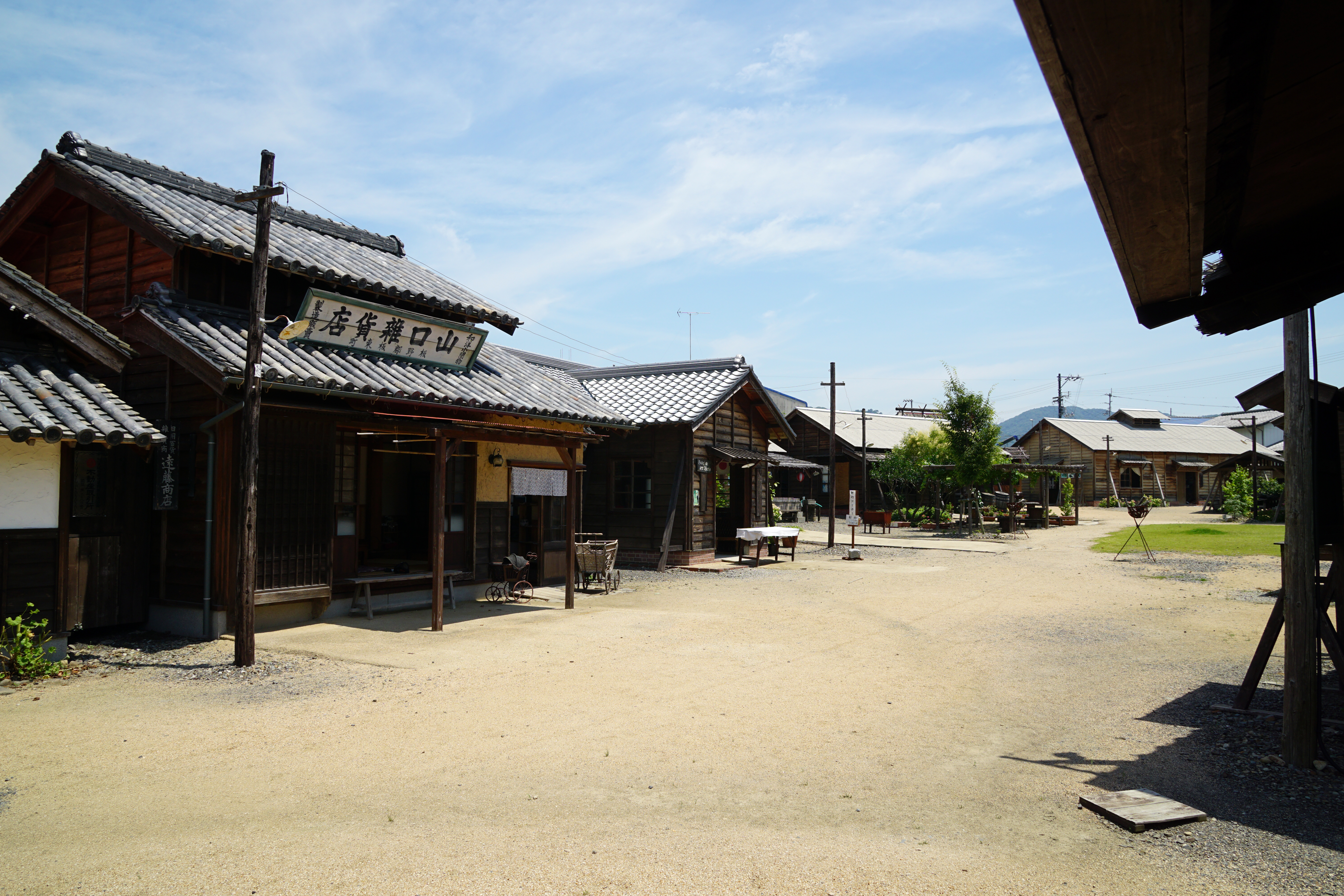
The museum of the history of Bandō prisoner-of-war camp "Baruto-no-niwa"

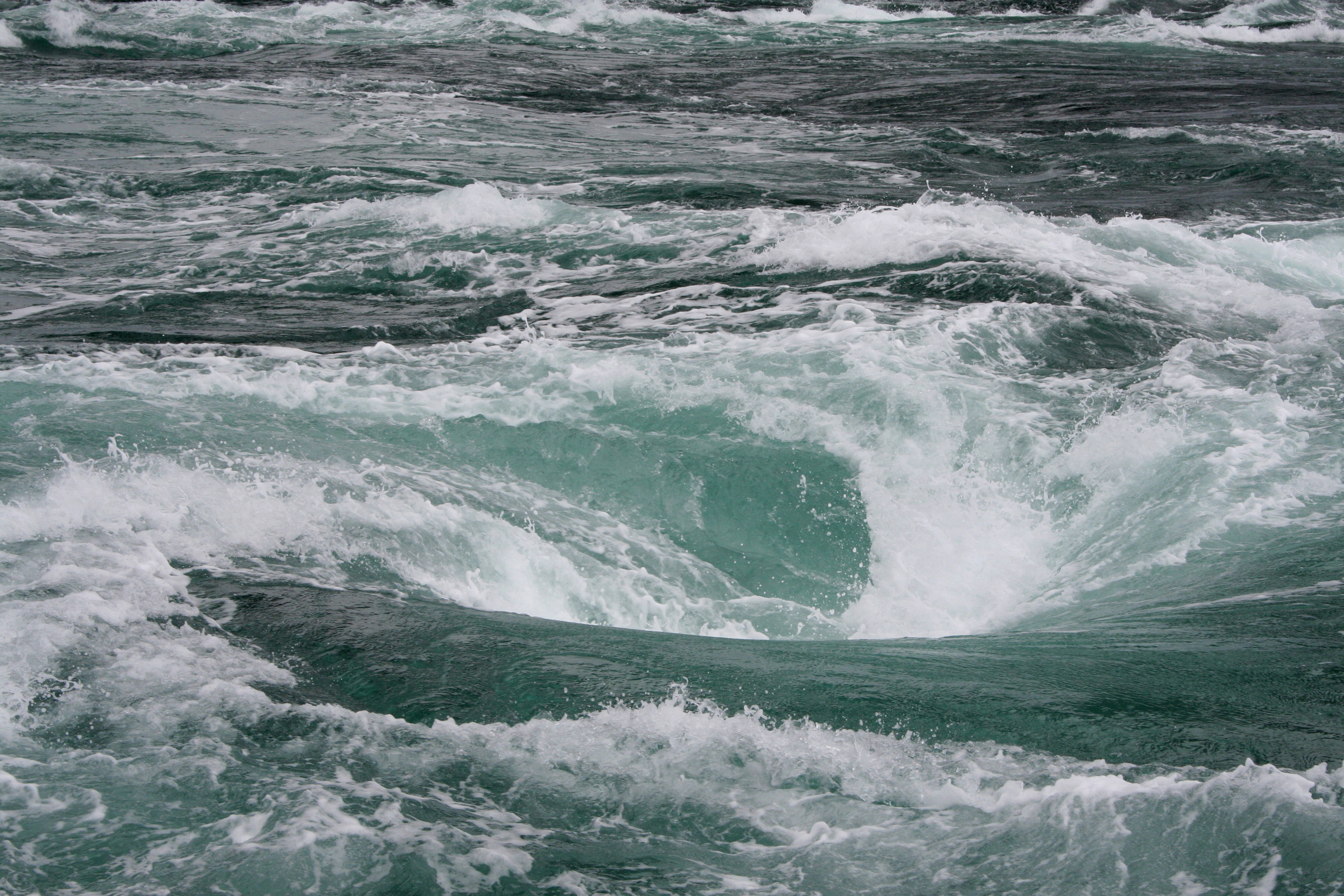
Naruto whirlpools

== Sports ==
Naruto has the home stadium of professional football team Tokushima Vortis and of baseball team Tokushima Indigo Socks.

== Traditional arts ==
- Ōtani-yaki

== Notable people ==
- Akihito Shimizu, Japanese sport shooter
