= Naruto Line =

Railway line in Tokushima Prefecture, Japan

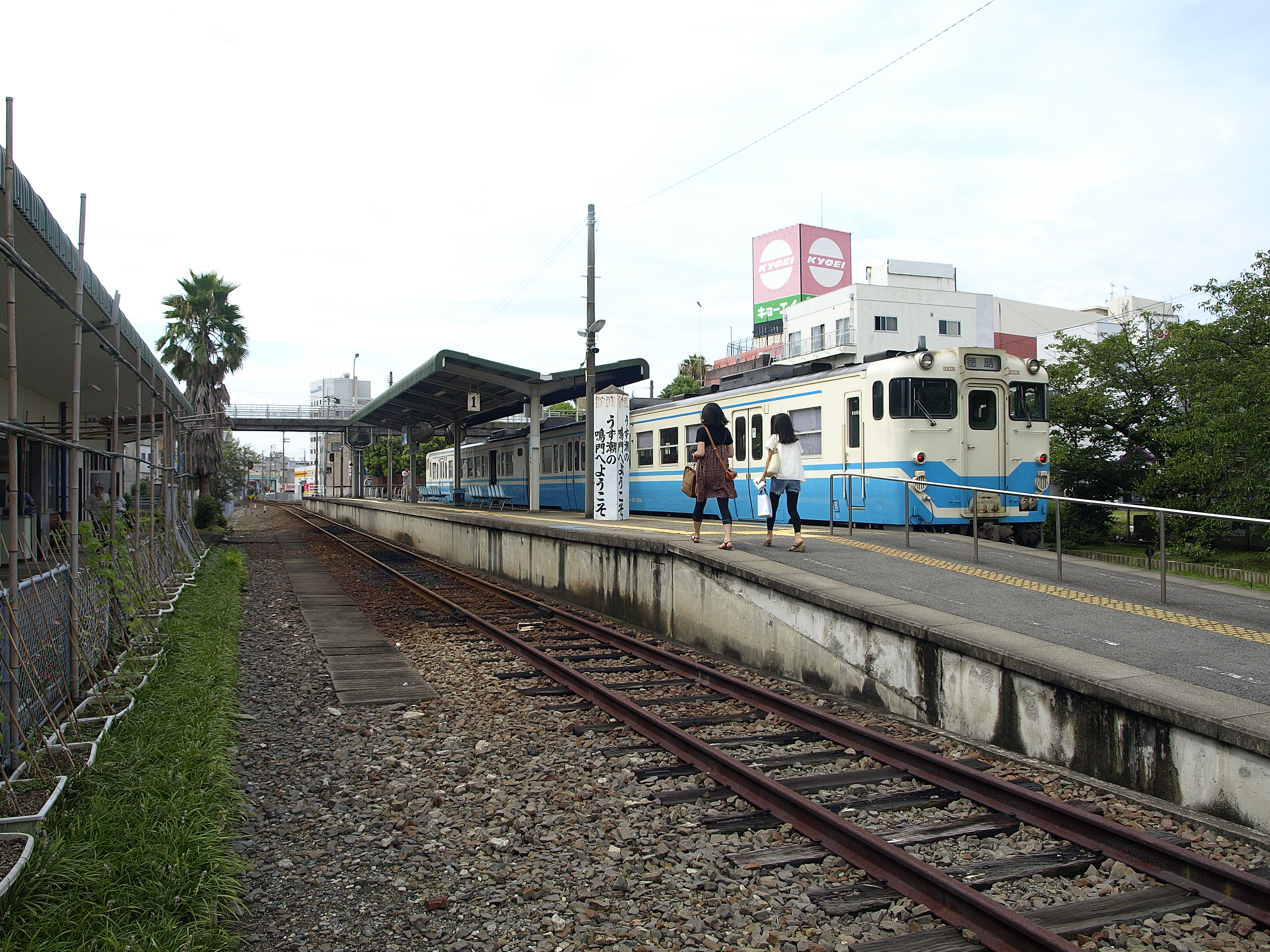
- Naruto railway station

Overview
- Locale: Tokushima Prefecture
- Termini: Ikenotani; Naruto
- Stations: 7

Service
- Type: Heavy rail
- Operator(s): JR Shikoku

History
- Opened: 1916; 110 years ago

Technical
- Line length: 8.5 km (5.3 mi)
- Track gauge: 1,067 mm (3 ft 6 in)
- Electrification: None
- Operating speed: 85 km/h (53 mph)
Route map

The Naruto Line (鳴門線, Naruto-sen) is a railway line in Japan operated by Shikoku Railway Company (JR Shikoku). It connects Ikenotani Station and Naruto Station in Naruto, Tokushima.

== History ==
In 1916 the Awa Electric Railway Co. opened a line from Nakahara to Naruto, including the Yoshinari–Ikenotani section, which is now part of the Kotoku Line.

In 1933 the company was nationalised.

CTC signalling was commissioned in 1977, and freight services ceased in 1984.

=== Former connecting lines ===
- Naruto station - A ferry to Fukura on Awaji Island enabled connection to the Awaji Railway Co. 23km 1067mm gauge line to Sumoto, where a ferry service to Tanagawa operated. The line opened between 1922 and 1925, was electrified at 600 VDC in 1947 and closed in 1966.

== Services ==
Although the official start of the line is at Ikenotani, rail services from Naruto are considered outbound, with the reverse being inbound. This is to allow for more efficient connecting service to the Kōtoku Line at Ikenotani.

All regular trains are local service trains. Most trains run through to Tokushima, with a few with service through onto the Mugi Line. There is no through service to or from Takamatsu, forcing passengers to transfer at Ikenotani. Moreover, connections to the Uzushio limited express service on the Kōtoku Line are poor, with waits of thirty minutes to an hour for a train.

Some trains are wanman driver-only operated, with others also having a conductor on board. Due to short platform lengths, the trains of three cars or more only allow the doors of certain cars to open at those stations. In addition, the entire line is single-tracked, with no passing permitted anywhere along the line except at the terminuses of Ikenotani and Naruto.

== Station list ==
- All stations are located in Naruto, Tokushima.
- Local trains stop at all stations.
- Trains can pass one another at stations marked "◇" and "^" and cannot pass at those marked "｜".

Station number	Station	Japanese	Distance (km)		Transfers	
Station number	Station	Japanese	Between stations	Total	Transfers	
N04	Ikenotani	池谷	-	0.0	Kōtoku Line (T04); Most trains through to Tokushima	◇
N05	Awa-Ōtani	阿波大谷	1.3	1.3		｜
N06	Tatsumichi	立道	1.7	3.0		｜
N07	Kyōkaimae	教会前	1.9	4.9		｜
N08	Konpiramae	金比羅前	0.8	5.7		｜
N09	Muya	撫養	1.5	7.2		｜
N10	Naruto	鳴門	1.3	8.5		∧

== See also ==
- List of railway lines in Japan
