= Ikenotani Station =

Railway station in Naruto, Tokushima Prefecture, Japan

T04 N04 Ikenotani Station 池谷駅
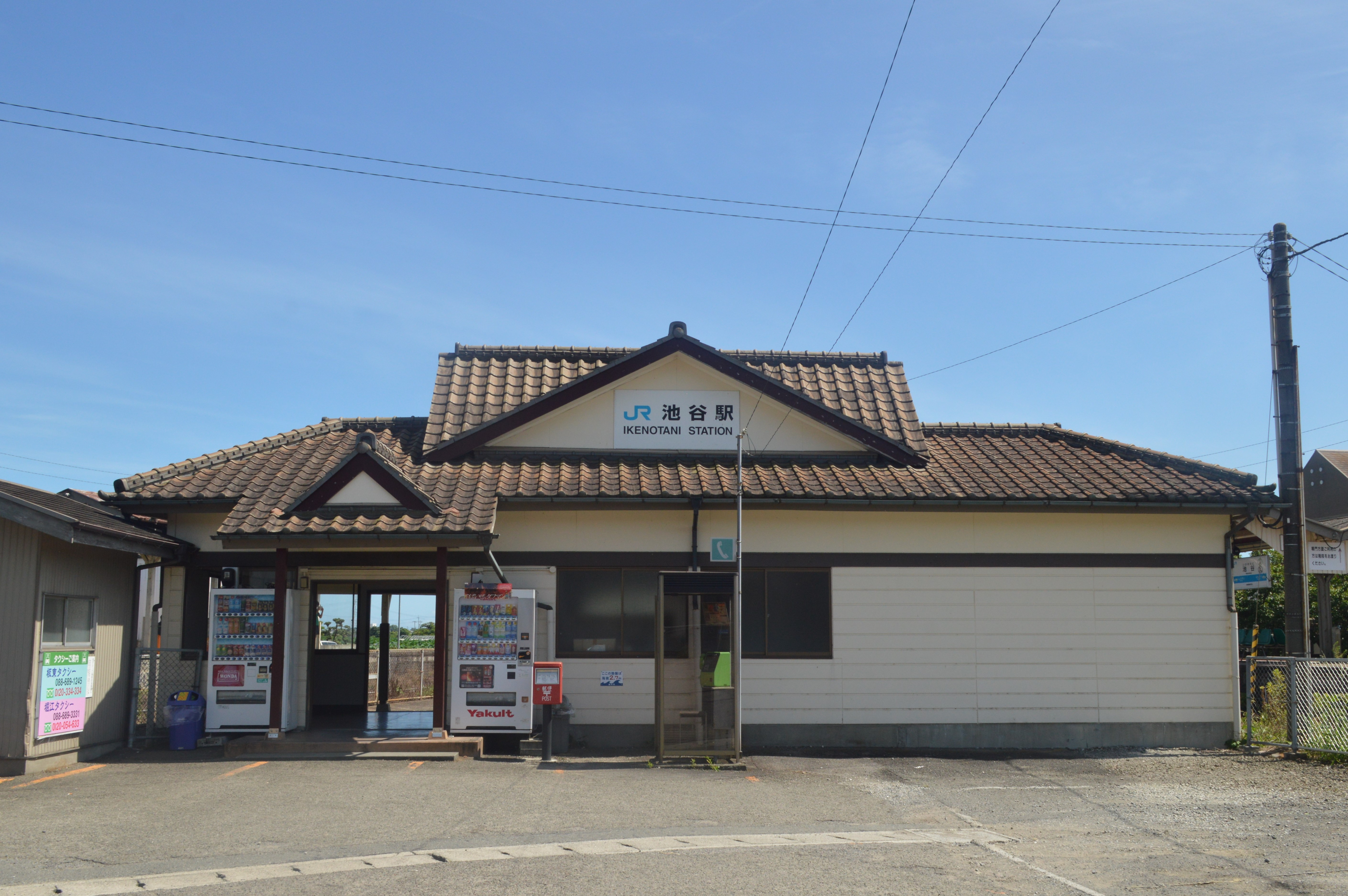
- Ikenotani Station in 2022

General information
- Location: Yanaginomoto-100 Ōasachō Ikenotani, Naruto- City, Tokushima Prefecture 779-0303; Japan
- Coordinates: 34°9′11″N 134°31′44″E
- Operator: JR Shikoku
- Lines: Kōtoku Line; Naruto Line
- Distance: 64.2 km (39.9 mi) from Takamatsu (Kōtoku Line); 0 km (Official start point of Naruto Line)
- Platforms: 2 island platforms
- Tracks: 4

Construction
- Structure type: At grade
- Accessible: No - island platforms accessed by footbridge

Other information
- Status: Unstaffed
- Station code: T04, N04

History
- Opened: 1 July 1916; 110 years ago

Passengers
- FY2019: 162

Services
Preceding station	JR Shikoku	Following station
Bandō T05 towards Takamatsu	Kōtoku Line	Shōzui T03 towards Tokushima
Terminus	Naruto Line	Awa-Ōtani N05 towards Naruto
Limited Express
Itano T07 towards Kojima	Uzushio	Shōzui T03 towards Tokushima
Location
- Location within Tokushima Prefecture Location within Japan

Ikenotani Station (池谷駅, Ikenotani-eki) is a junction passenger railway station located in the city of Naruto, Tokushima Prefecture, Japan. It is operated by JR Shikoku. It has two station numbers: "T04" for the Kōtoku Line and "N04" for the Naruto Line.

== Lines ==
Ikenotani Station is served by the Kōtoku Line and is 64.2 km from the beginning of the line at Takamatsu. It is also the terminus of the 8.5 kilometer Naruto Line; however many of the local trains on the Naruto Line provide a through service using the Kōtoku Line track to end and start again at Tokushima.

In addition, some trains of the Uzushio limited express between Okayama, Takamatsu and Tokushima also stop at the station.

== Layout ==
The station consists of two island platforms set in a "V"-shape. The island platform to the west serves two tracks of the Kōtoku Line while the one to the east serves two tracks of the Naruto Line. A station building is located in the centre of the "V". This is unstaffed and serves only as a waiting room. An E-shaped footbridge provides access from the station building to either island platform. South of the platforms, the four tracks merge through a series of points into a single track towards Tokushima. Steps and an elevator provide access to the island platform at the second level. Parking for bicycles is available under the elevated tracks.

=== Platforms ===
1, 2	T Kōtoku Line	for Itano and Takamatsu for Tokushima
3	T Naruto Line	for Naruto
4	N Naruto Line	for Tokushima

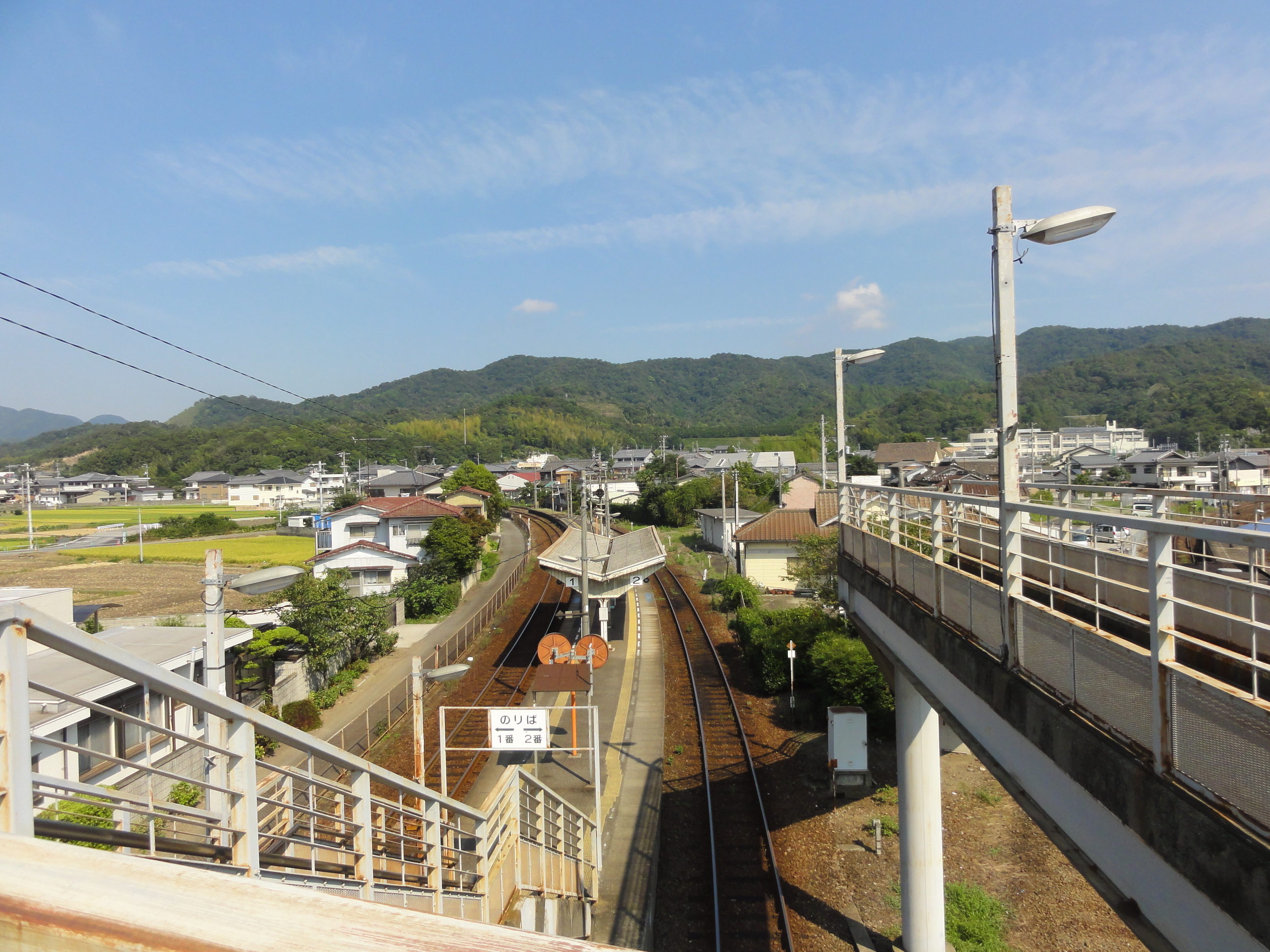
A view of the western (Kōtoku Line) platforms looking in the direction of Takamatsu. The station building is the red tiled building partly obscured by a section of footbridge to the right.

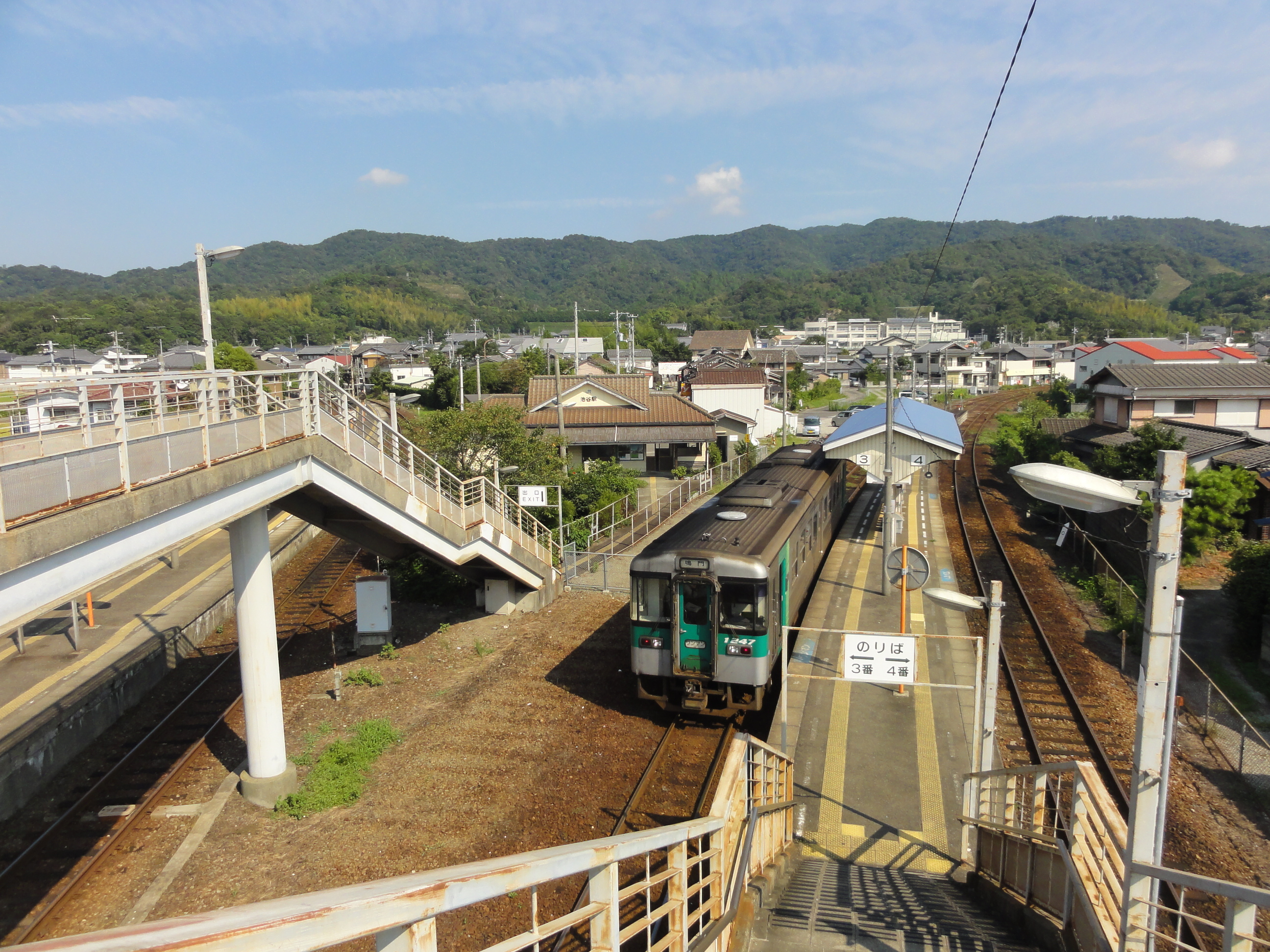
A view of the eastern (Naruto Line) platforms looking in the direction of Naruto. The station building is in the centre and the Kōtoku Line platforms can be glimpsed to the extreme left.

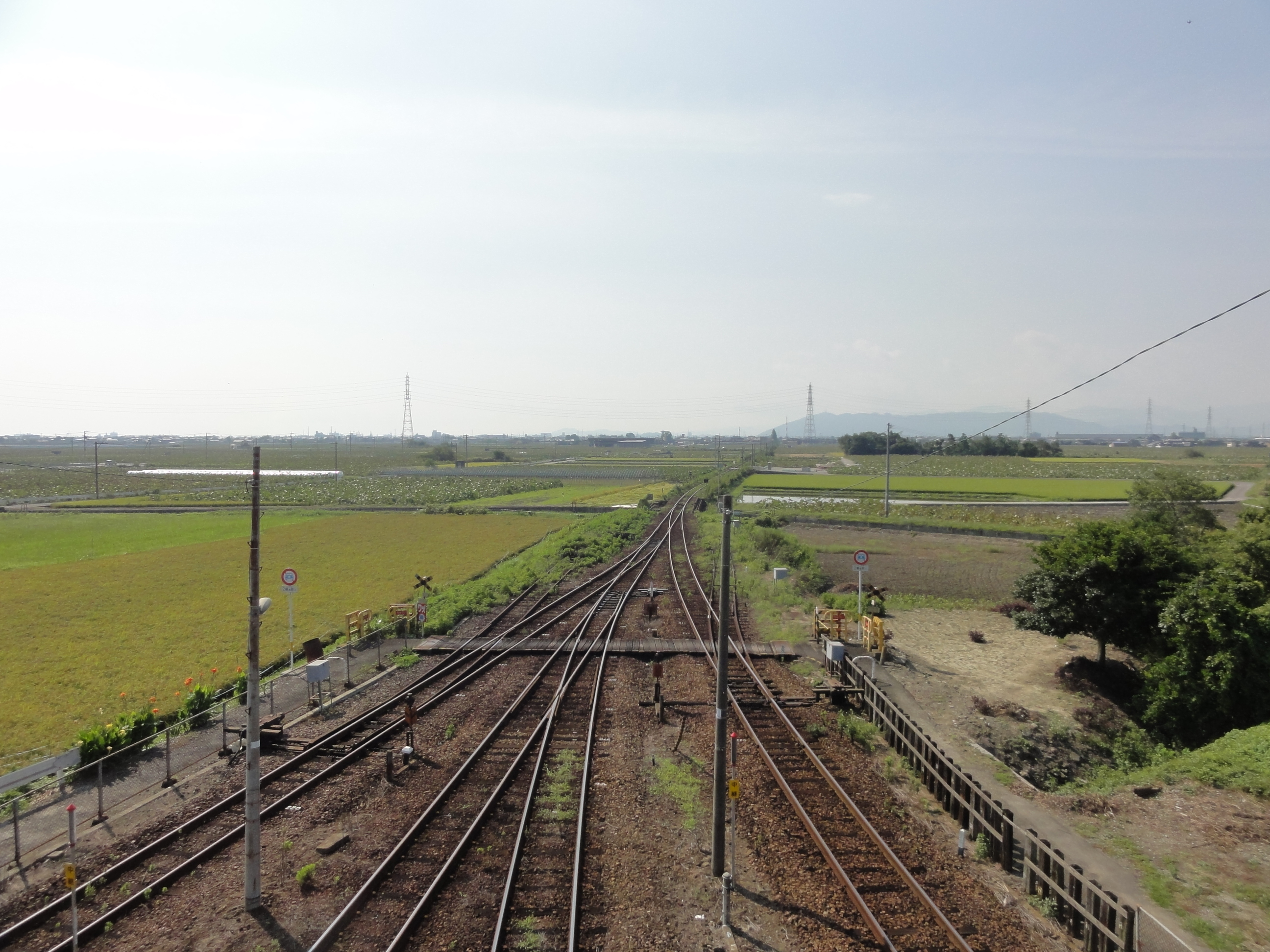
South of the station, the four tracks merge into one heading to Tokushima.

== History ==
The station was opened on 1 July 1916 as s station on the privately run Awa Electric Railway (later the Awa Railway). It was an intermediate station on a new stretch of track laid down by the company from Muya to Yoshinari and the now closed Furokawa. On 15 February 1923 a stretch of track was laid to Awa-Ōdera (now Itano) and Kajiyabara (now closed). On 1 July 1933: the Awa Railway was nationalized and Japanese Government Railways (JGR) took over control of the station. The station was operated as part of the Awa Line. The station became part of Kōtoku Main Line with through traffic from Takamatsu to Sako from 20 March 1935. The stretch of track to Muya became the Muya Line with Ikenotani Station now designated as the official start of the line, In the process of these changes, the station was moved to its present location. On 1 March 1952 the Muya Line was renamed the Naruto Line. On 1 April 1987 JNR (the successor to JGR) was privatized. JR Shikoku assumed control of the station. On 1 June 1988 the Kōtoku Main Line was renamed the Kōtoku Line.

== Passenger statistics ==
In fiscal 2019, the station was used by an average of 162 passengers daily

== Surrounding area ==
- Naruto City Oasa Junior High School

== See also ==
- List of railway stations in Japan
