= Naruto Station =

Railway station in Naruto, Tokushima Prefecture, Japan

N10 Naruto Station 鳴門駅
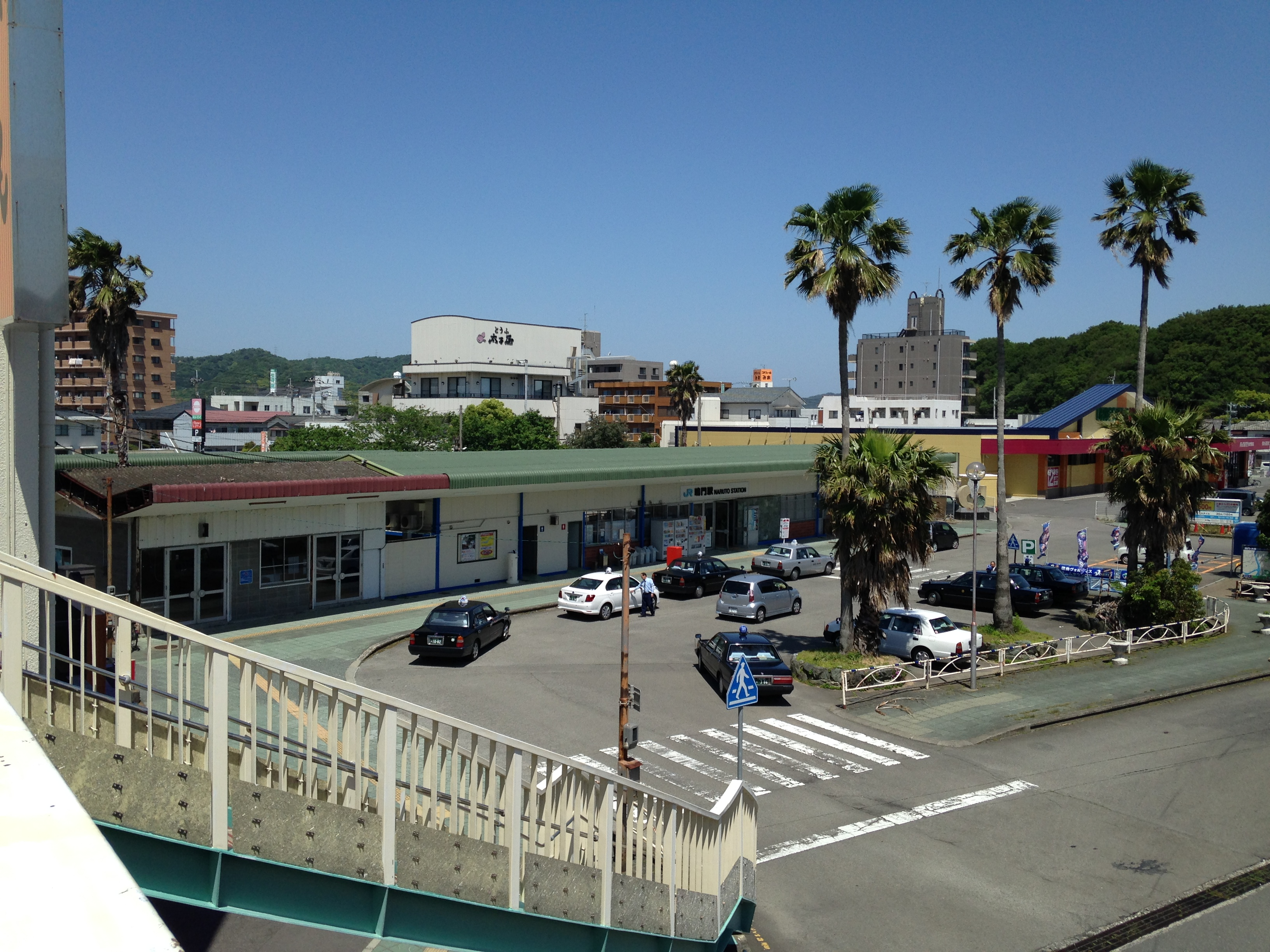
- Naruto Station in 2016

General information
- Location: Maehama Muyachō Kokuwajima, Naruto City, Tokushima Prefecture 772-0012; Japan
- Coordinates: 34°10′44″N 134°36′32″E
- Operator: JR Shikoku
- Line: Naruto Line
- Distance: 7.2 km (4.5 mi) from Ikenotani
- Platforms: 1 island platform
- Tracks: 2

Construction
- Structure type: At grade
- Parking: Available
- Accessible: Yes - level crossing to island platform

Other information
- Status: Staffed
- Station code: N10
- Website: Official website

History
- Opened: 18 January 1928; 98 years ago
- Former names: Muya (to 1948)

Passengers
- FY2019: 1502

Services
Preceding station	JR Shikoku	Following station
Muya N09 towards Ikenotani	Naruto Line	Terminus
Location
- Location within Tokushima Prefecture Location within Japan

Naruto Station (鳴門駅, Naruto-eki) is a passenger railway station located in the city of Naruto, Tokushima Prefecture, Japan. It is operated by JR Shikoku and has the station number "N10".

== Lines ==
Naruto Station is the terminus by the JR Shikoku Naruto Line and is located 8.5 km from the opposing terminus of the line at Ikenotani. Only local services stop at the station.

== Layout ==
The station consists of an island platform serving two dead-headed tracks. The station building houses a waiting room and is staffed. Access to the island platform is by means of a level crossing. Parking is available at the station forecourt.

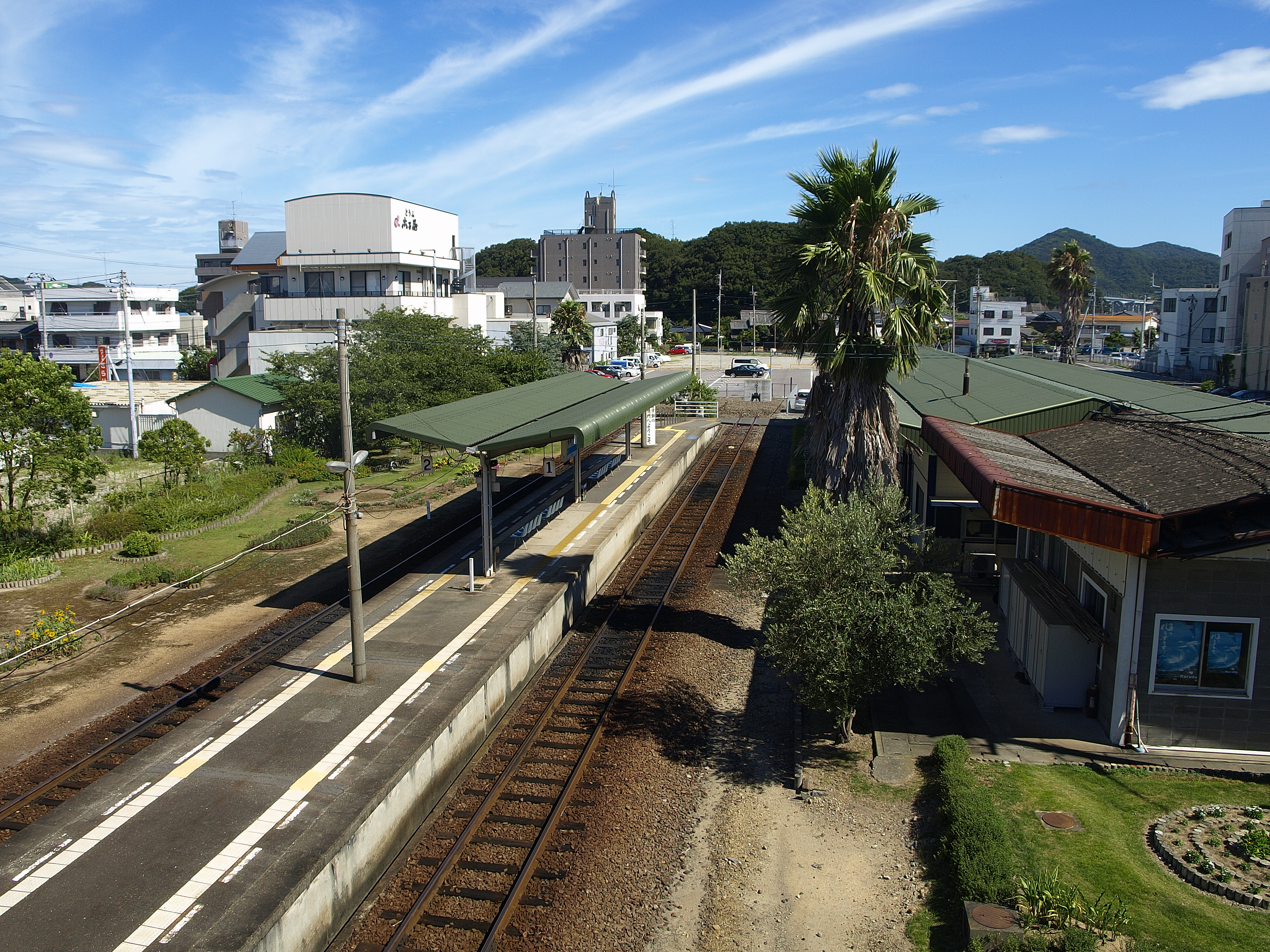
A view of the station platforms and tracks.

== History ==
Naruto Station was opened as Muya Station (撫養駅) by the privately run Awa Electric Railway (later the Awa Railway) on 18 January 1928 by extending the track from the previous terminus, which was also named Muya. The new terminus took on the name of Muya while the former terminus became Ebisumae Station (ゑびす前駅). After the Awa Railway was nationalized on 1 July 1933, Japanese Government Railways (JGR) took over control of the station and operated it as part of the Awa Line until 20 March 1935 when some other stations on the line were absorbed into the Kōtoku Main Line. The station then became part of the Muya Line. On 1 August 1948, the station was renamed Naruto Station. On 1 March 1956, the line which served the station was renamed the Naruto Line. On 1 April 1987, with the privatization of Japanese National Railways (JNR), the successor of JGR, the station came under the control of JR Shikoku.

== Passenger statistics ==
In fiscal 2019, the station was used by an average of 1502 passengers daily

== Surrounding area ==
- Japan National Route 28

== See also ==
- List of railway stations in Japan
