= T25 =

T25 may refer to:

== Automobiles ==
- T.25, a city car
- Cooper T25, a sports car
- Volkswagen T25, a van

== Other uses ==
- German torpedo boat T25
- Ritsurin Station, in Takamatsu, Kagawa, Japan
- T25 Medium Tank, an American tank
- T25, a size of Torx screw
- Tanimachi Kyūchōme Station, in Tennōji-ku, Osaka, Japan
