= Shōwachō Station =

Shōwachō Station may refer to:

- Shōwachō Station (Osaka), a train station on the Osaka Metro Midōsuji Line in Abeno-ku, Osaka, Japan
- Shōwachō Station (Kagawa), a train station on the JR Shikoku Kōtoku Line in Takamatsu, Kagawa Prefecture, Japan
