= Ritsurin Garden =

Garden in Takamatsu, Kagawa Prefecture, Japan

- Ritsurin Kōen (栗林公園)
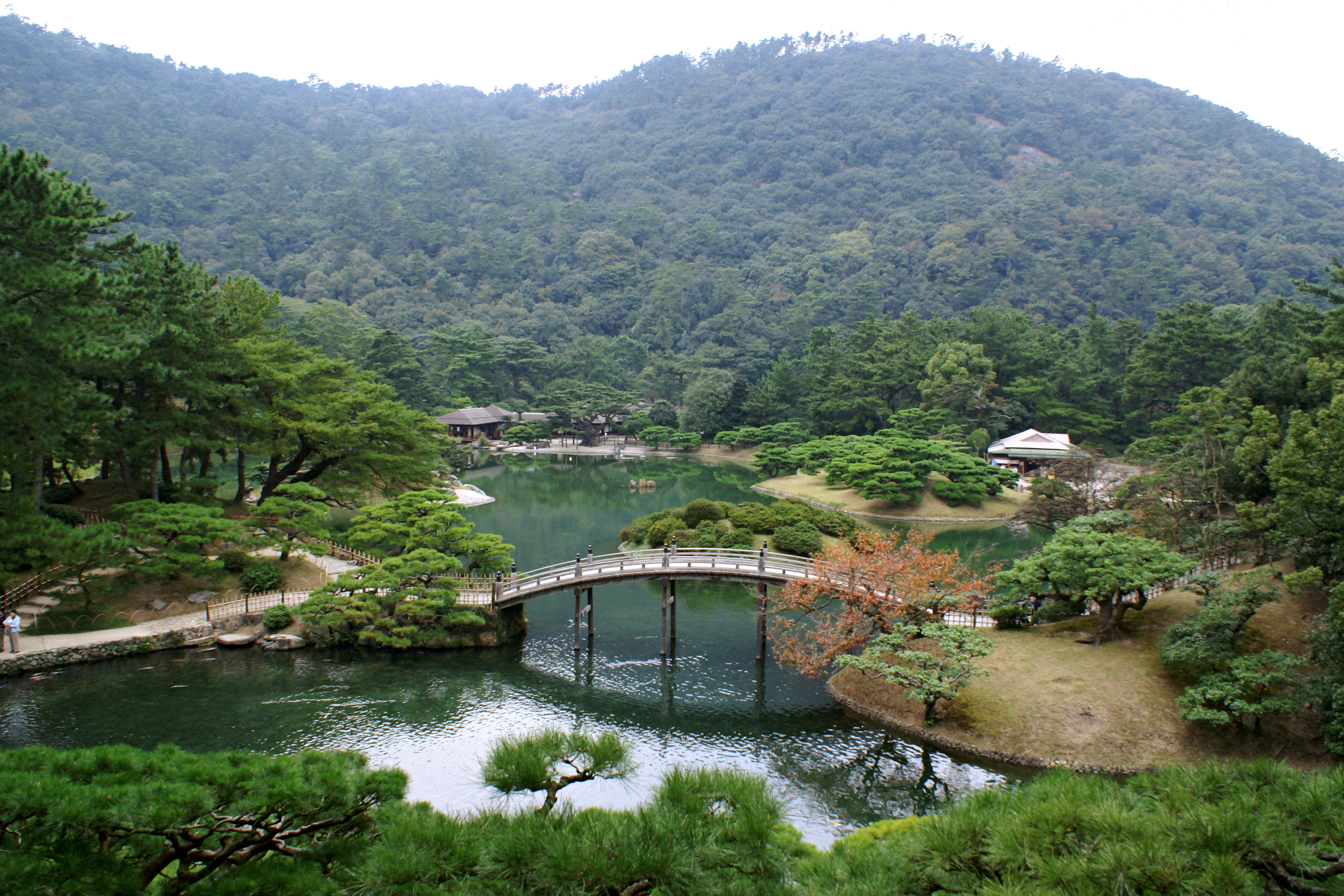
- View from hill, with Mt. Shiun in background
- Interactive map of Ritsurin Garden
- Type: Japanese garden
- Location: Takamatsu, Japan
- Coordinates: 34°19′47″N 134°02′38″E
- Area: 75 hectares (190 acres)
- Created: 1625

Scenes from Ritsurin Garden

Ritsurin Garden (栗林公園, Ritsurin Kōen) is a large, historic garden in Takamatsu, Japan. It was completed in 1745 as a private strolling garden and villa for the local feudal lords, and opened to the public in 1875. Ritsurin is one of the largest strolling gardens in Japan, and a major tourist attraction for Kagawa Prefecture.

Ritsurin Garden lies in a former river bed on the east side of Mt. Shiun. Numerous ponds and small artificial hills dot the garden. The southern portion is in traditional Japanese style, with historic teahouses and numerous shaped pine trees. After becoming a public garden in 1875, the north portion underwent Western-style redesigns, and a large museum (currently the multipurpose Commerce and Industry Promotion Hall) and folk craft galleries were built in the center of the garden. For a time, the garden even housed a zoo and swimming pool, since closed and removed.

== History ==
The buildings in the garden date back to the early 17th century. In 1625, the feudal lord of Takamatsu in Sanuki Province, Ikoma Takatoshi, began construction of Ritsurin, specifically the building of a garden around the South Pond using the beautiful greenery of Mt. Shiun ("Purple Cloud Mountain") as a backdrop. After Matsudaira Yorishige took control of the province, he continued the garden's construction. Work was completed by the Fifth Lord Yoritaka in 1745 after 100 years of improvements and extensions made by successive lords.

The new Meiji government came to power in 1868 and requisitioned the garden. Despite an initial proposal to build a silk mill, Ritsurin was designated a prefectural garden and opened to the public on 16 March 1875. In 1953, the garden was designated a Special Place of Scenic Beauty.

== Features ==
The garden covers 750,000 square meters. Among the features of the garden are:

- Kikugetsu-tei (Moon Scooping Pavilion): This teahouse located in the southern section of the garden was built in the early years of the Edo period (around 1640).
- Hakomatsu: Carefully cultivated black pine trees; their branches, twigs, and needles are elaborately trimmed into geometrical shapes and figures.
- Hiraiho and Fuyō-ho: two artificial mountains
- Wild Duck Hunting Moat
- Sai-ko (Western Lake)
- Nan-ko (Southern Lake)

The many ponds and streams are full of koi, sometimes fed by visitors.

== Gallery ==
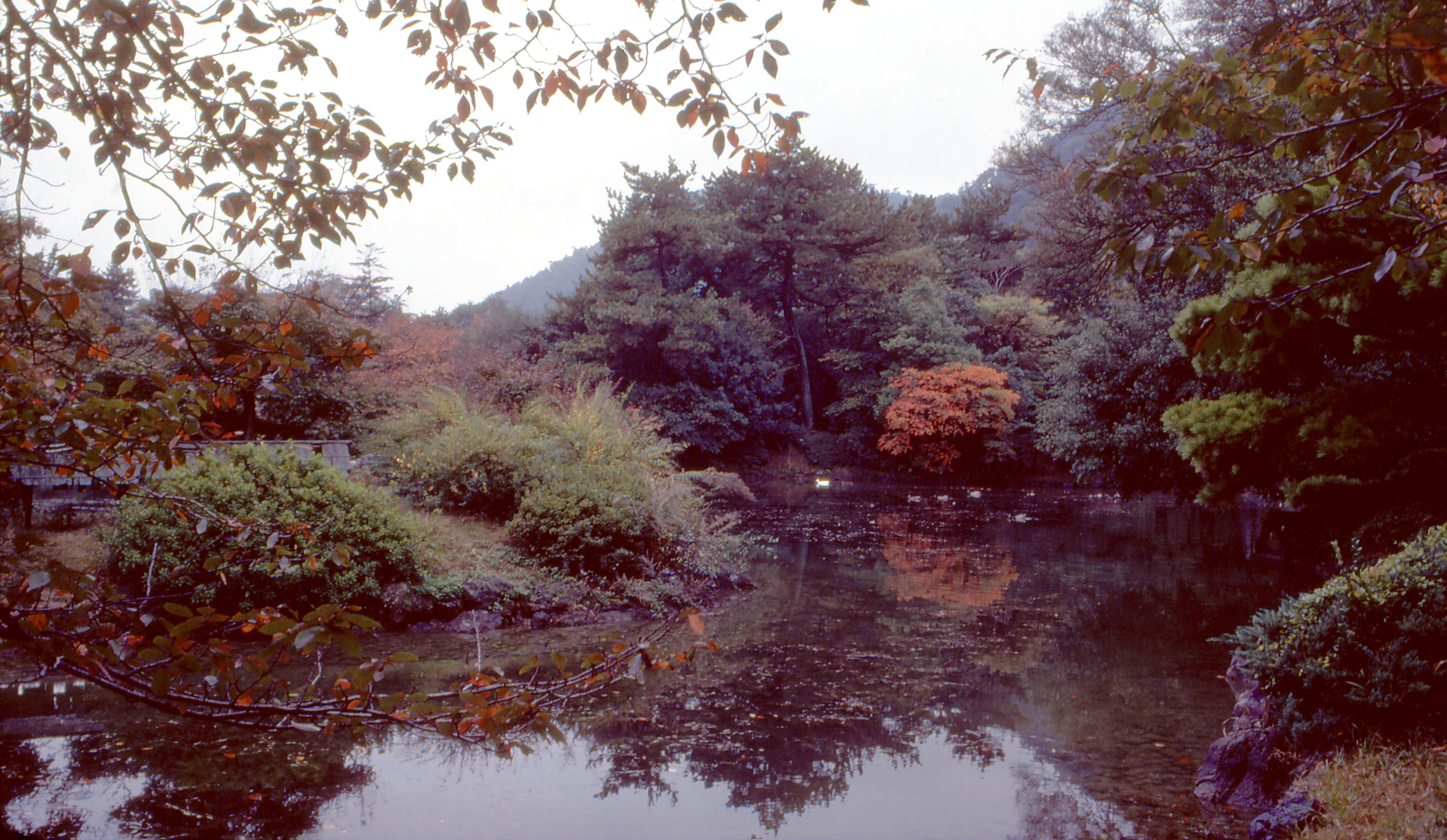
Gun_o Pond

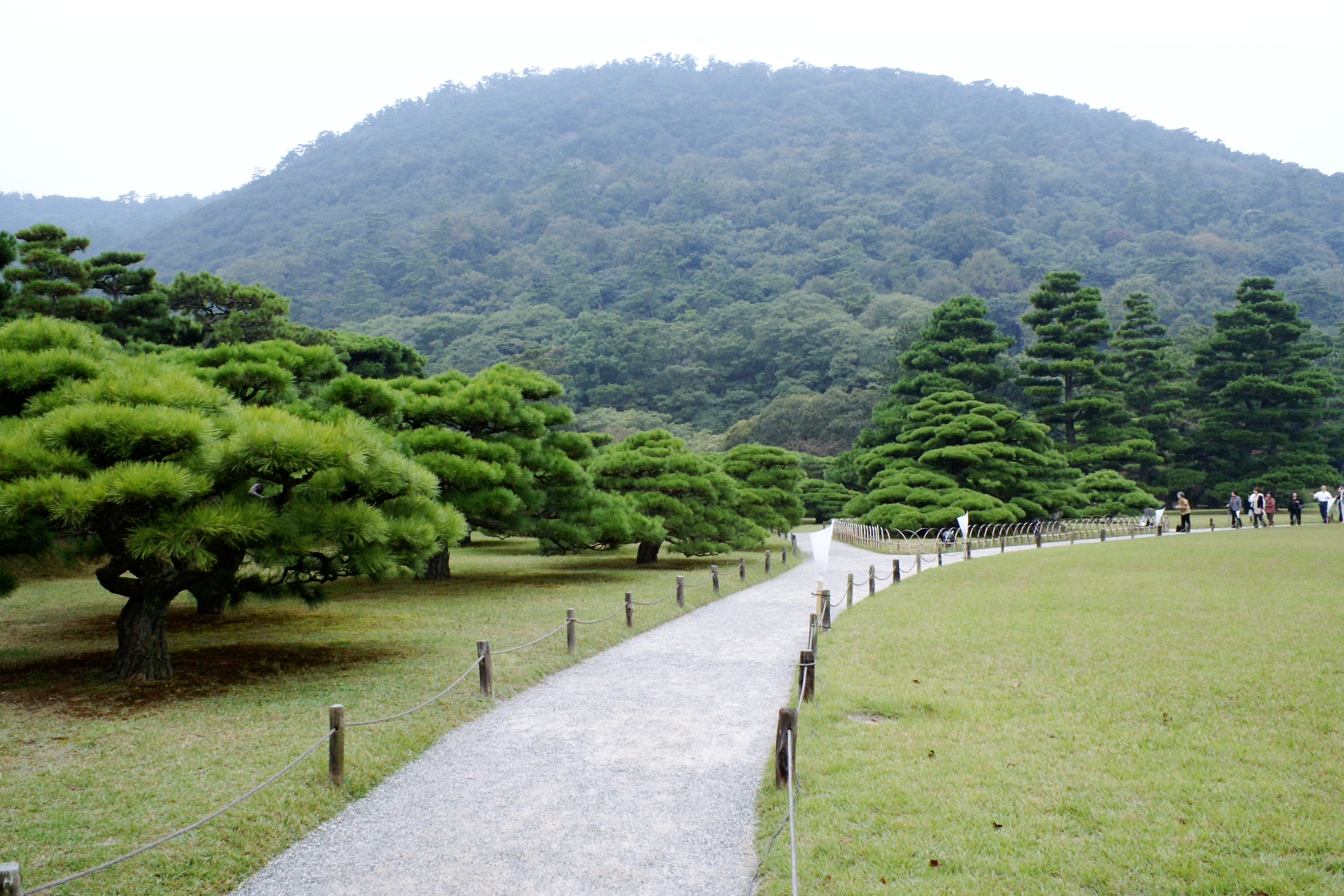
Mt. Shiun

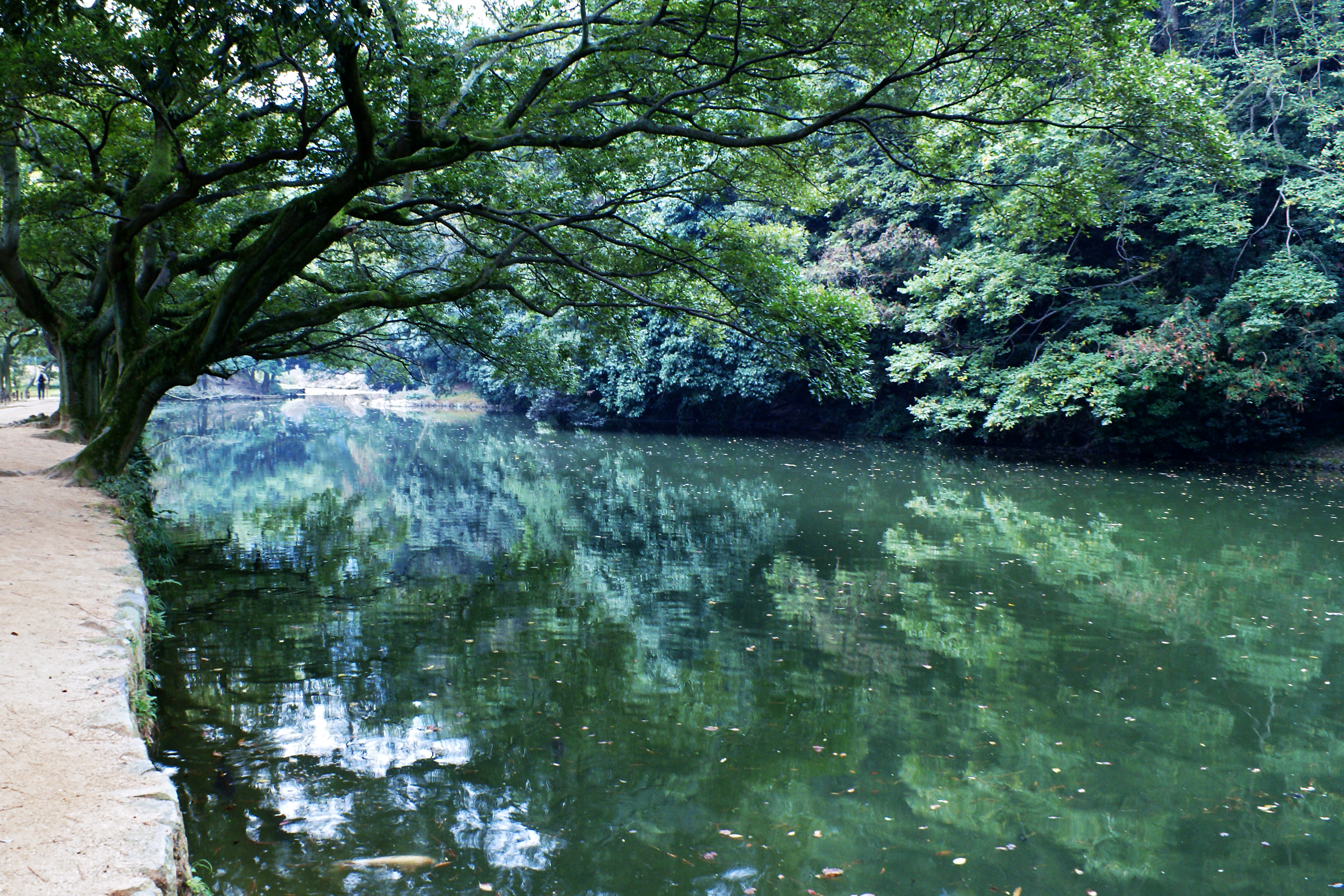
Sai-ko

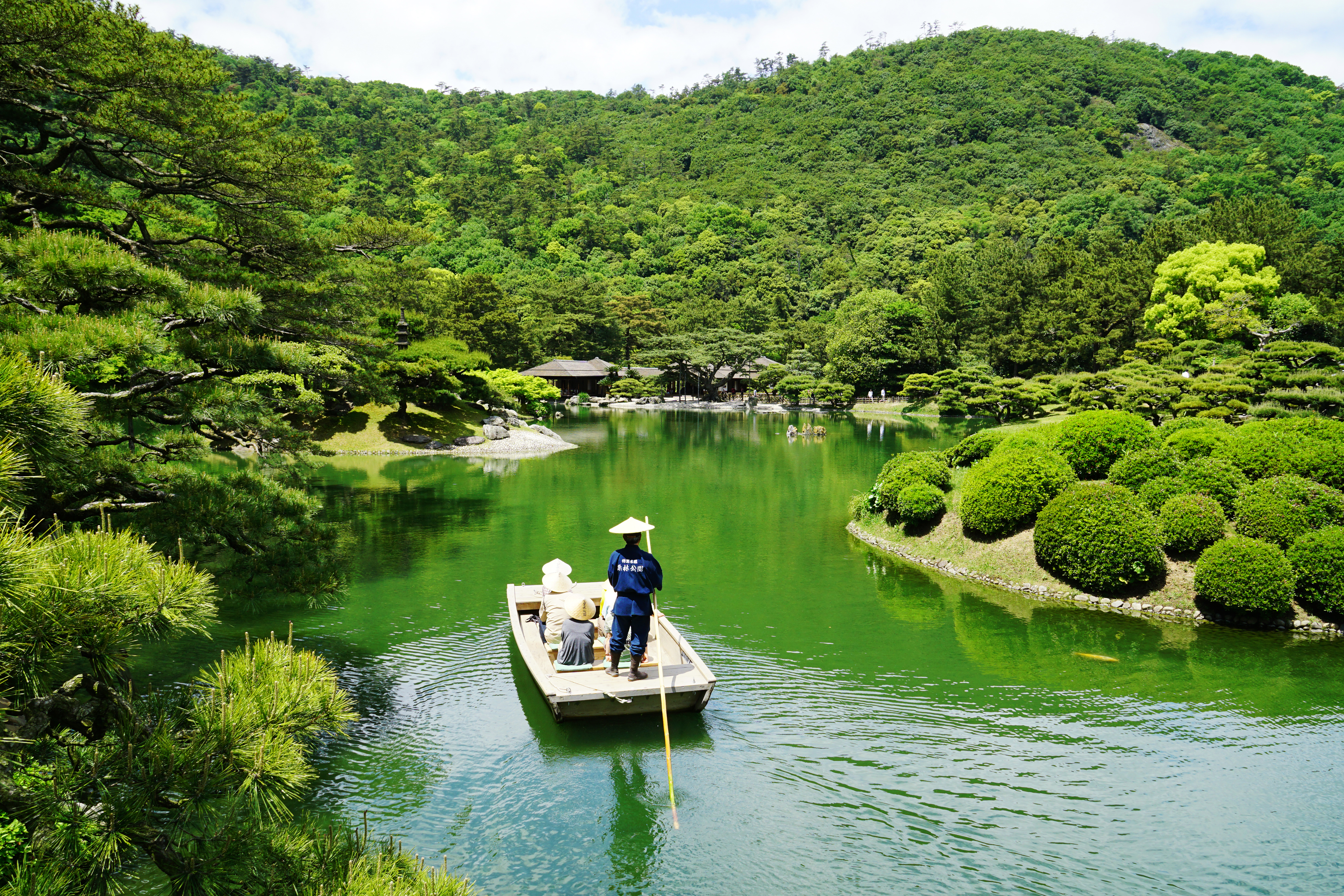
Nan-ko

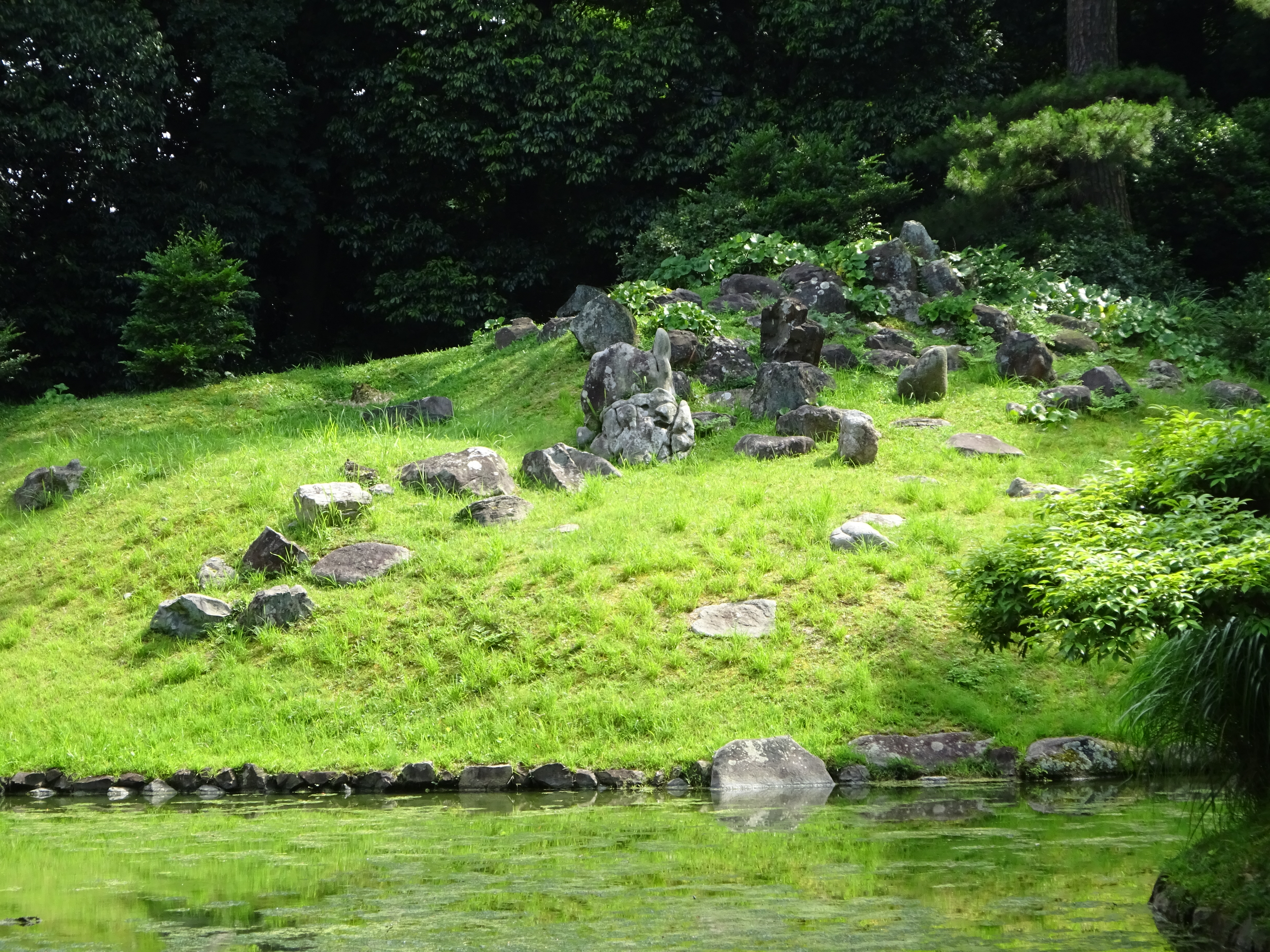
Rock formation

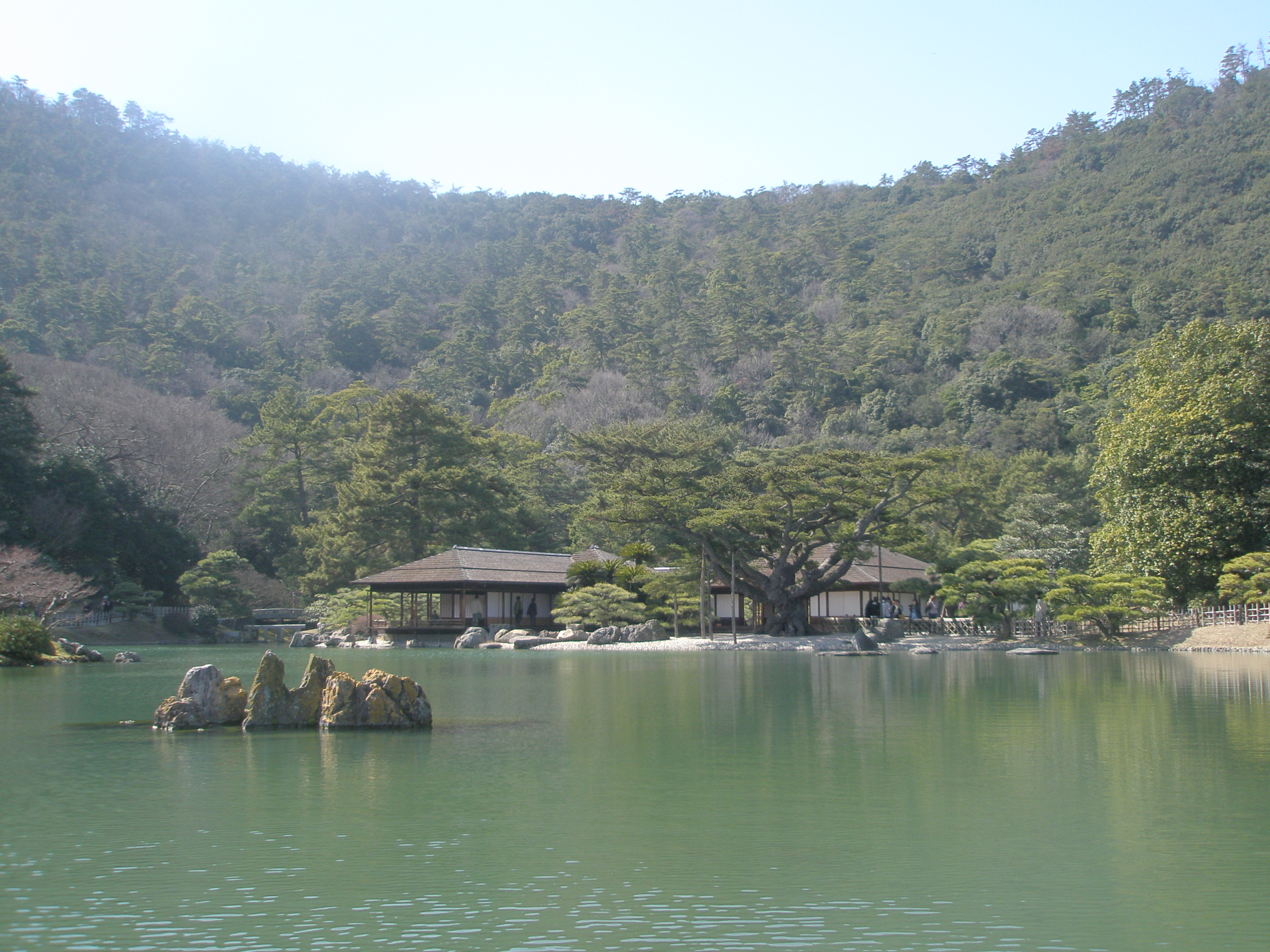

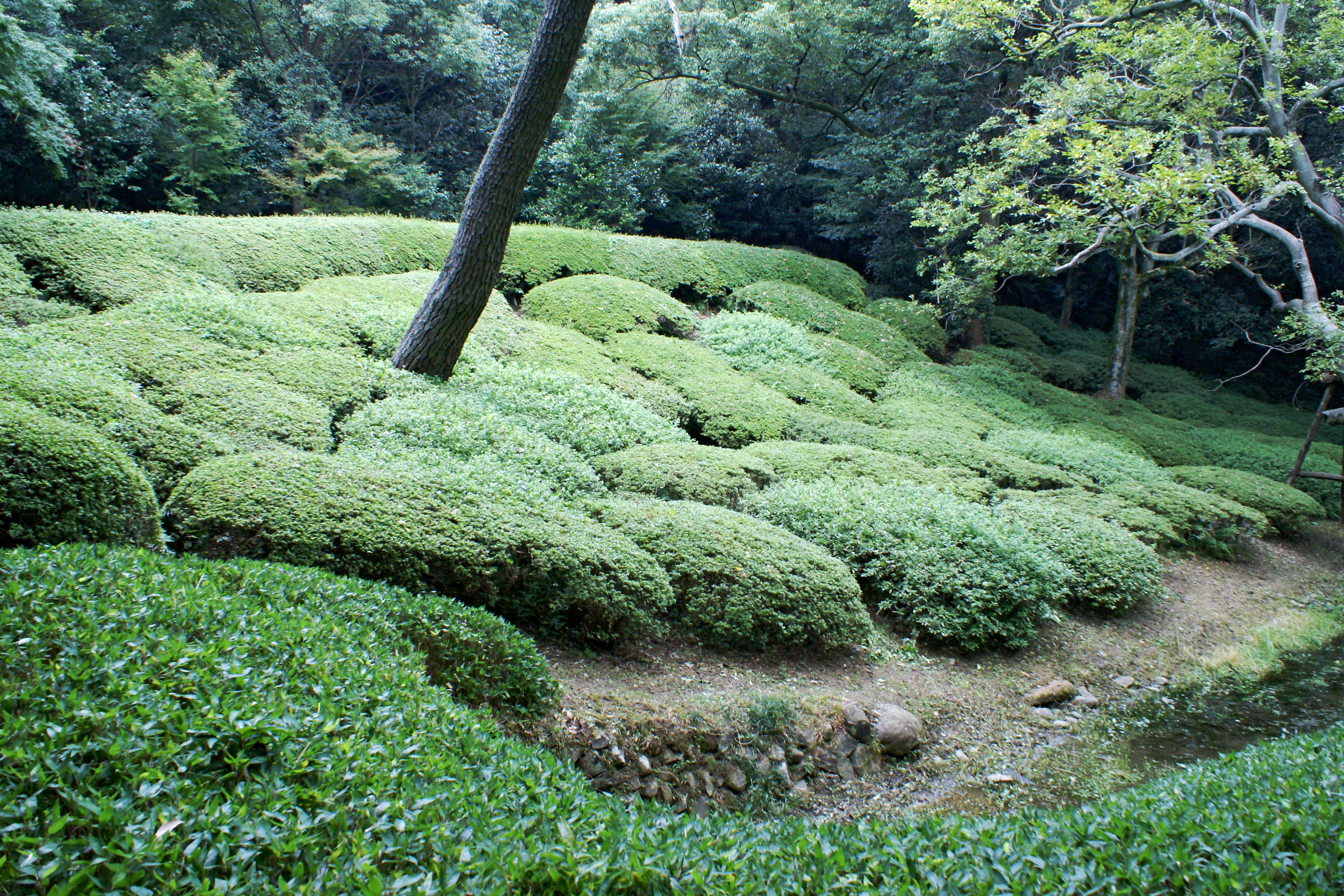

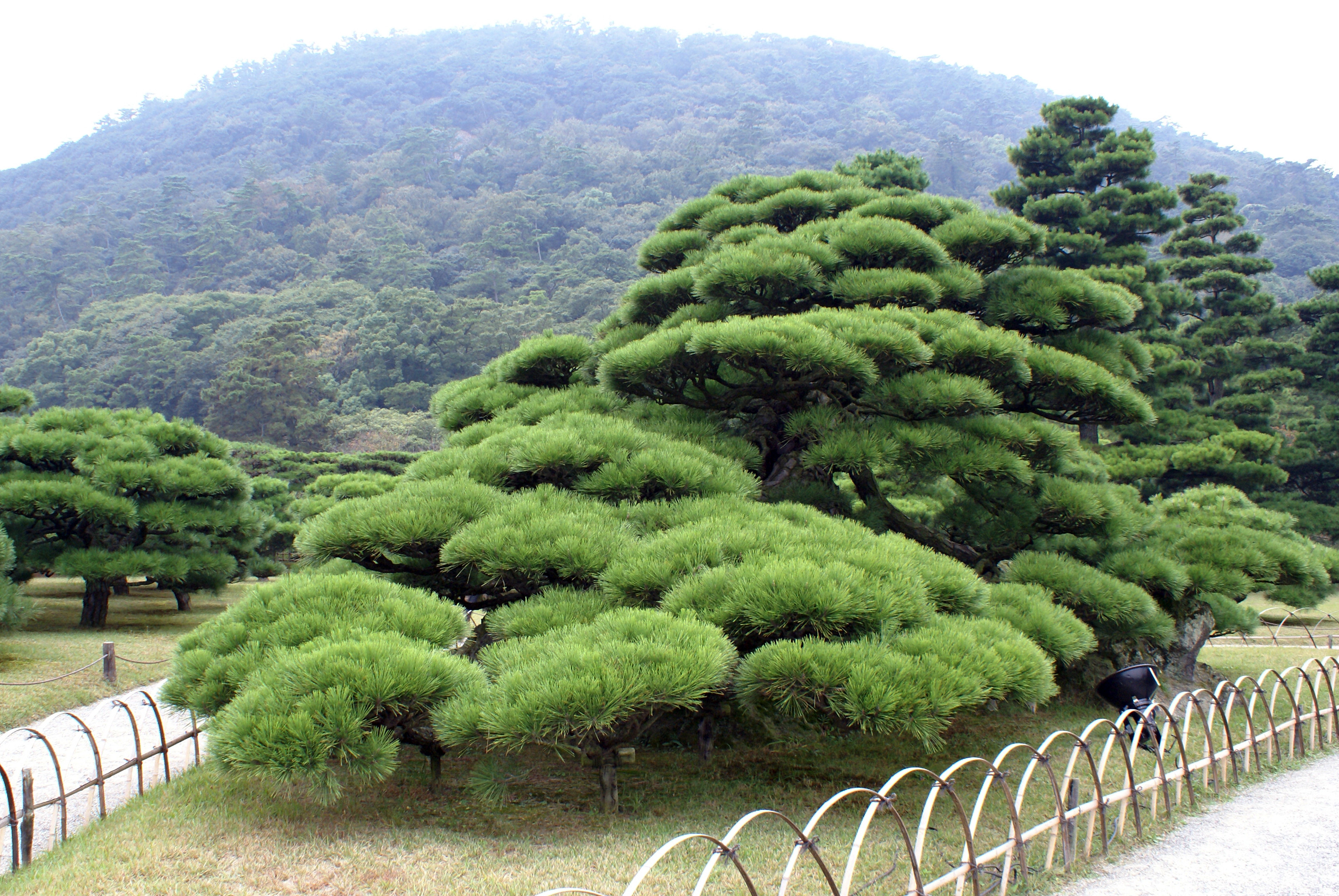

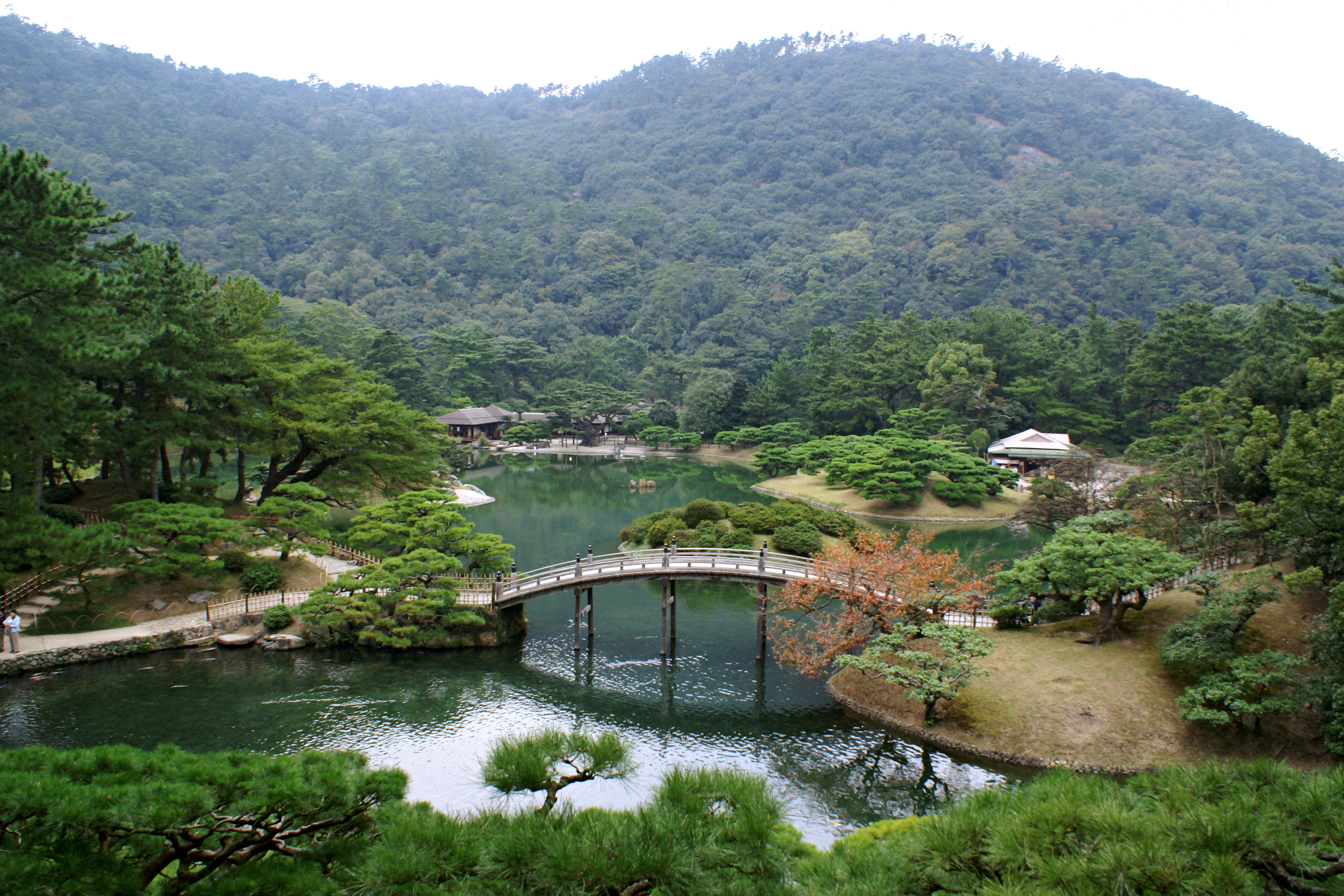

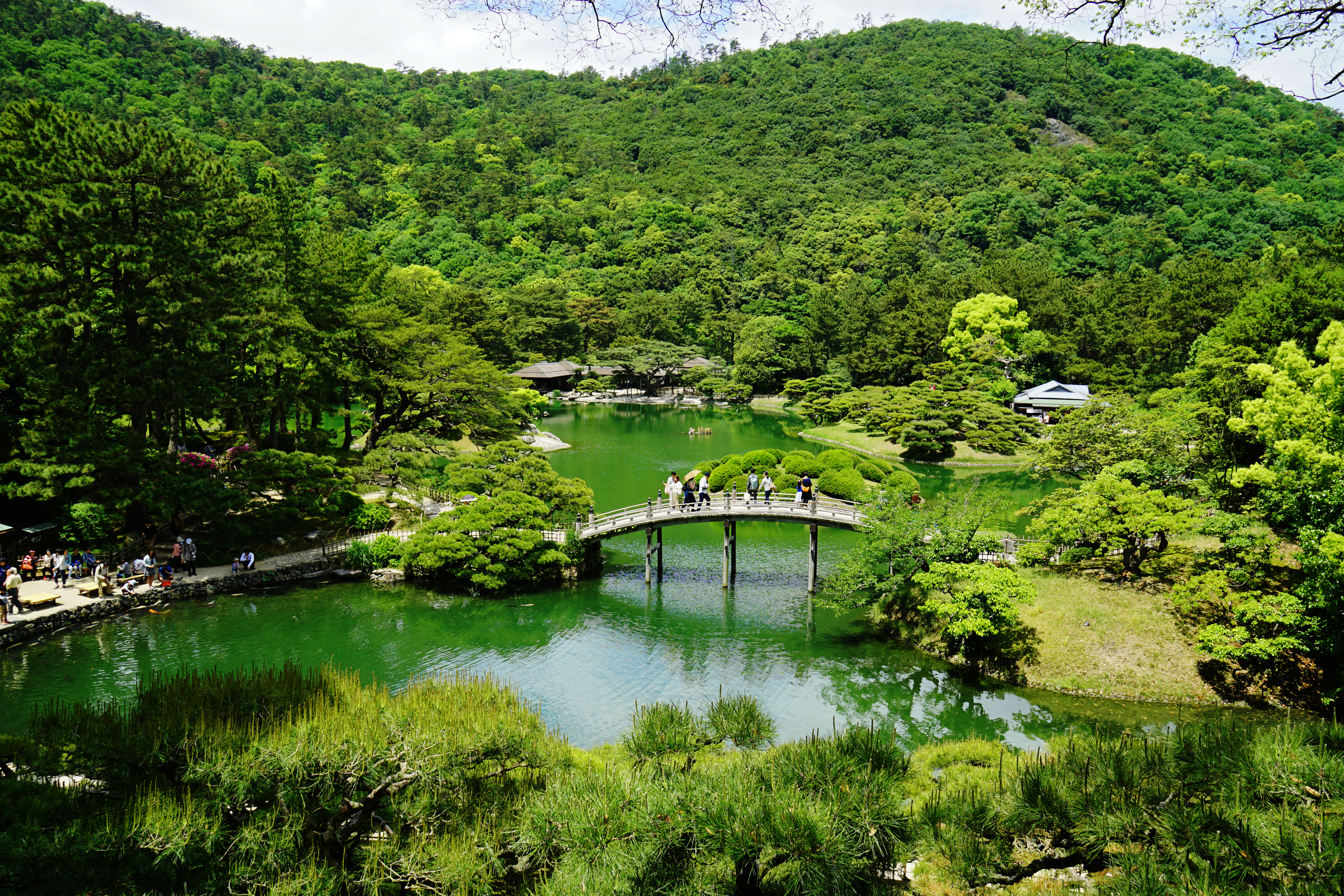

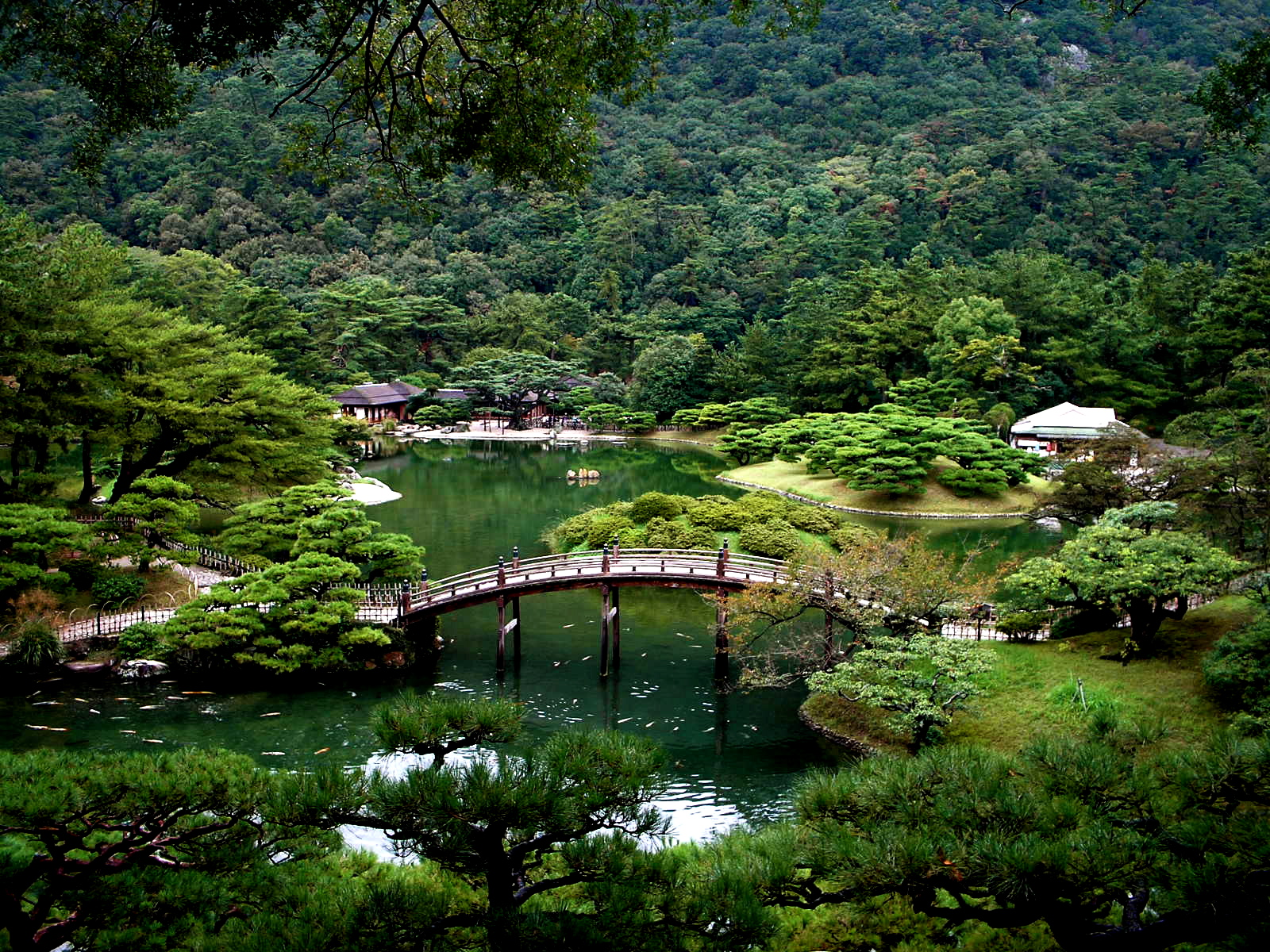

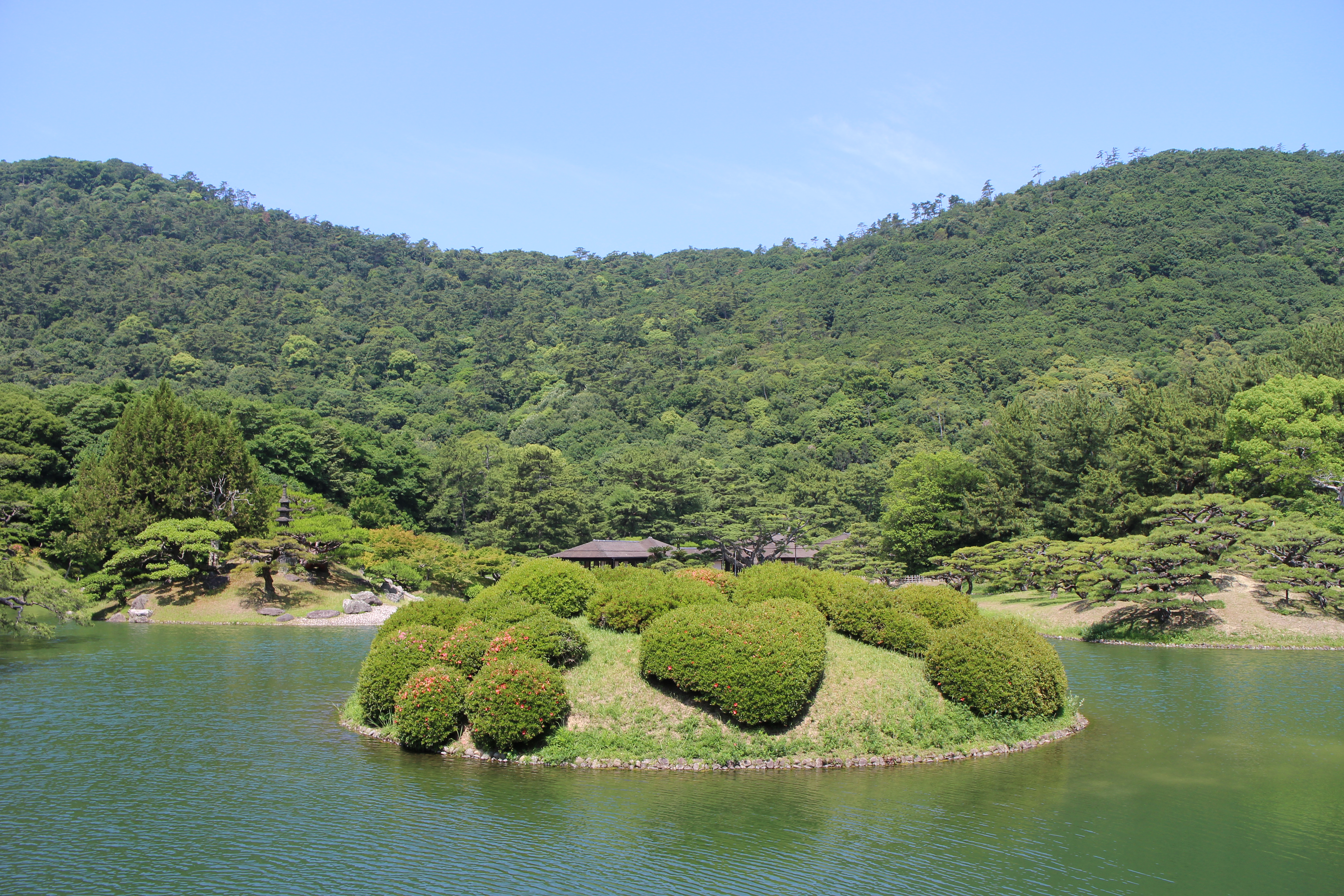

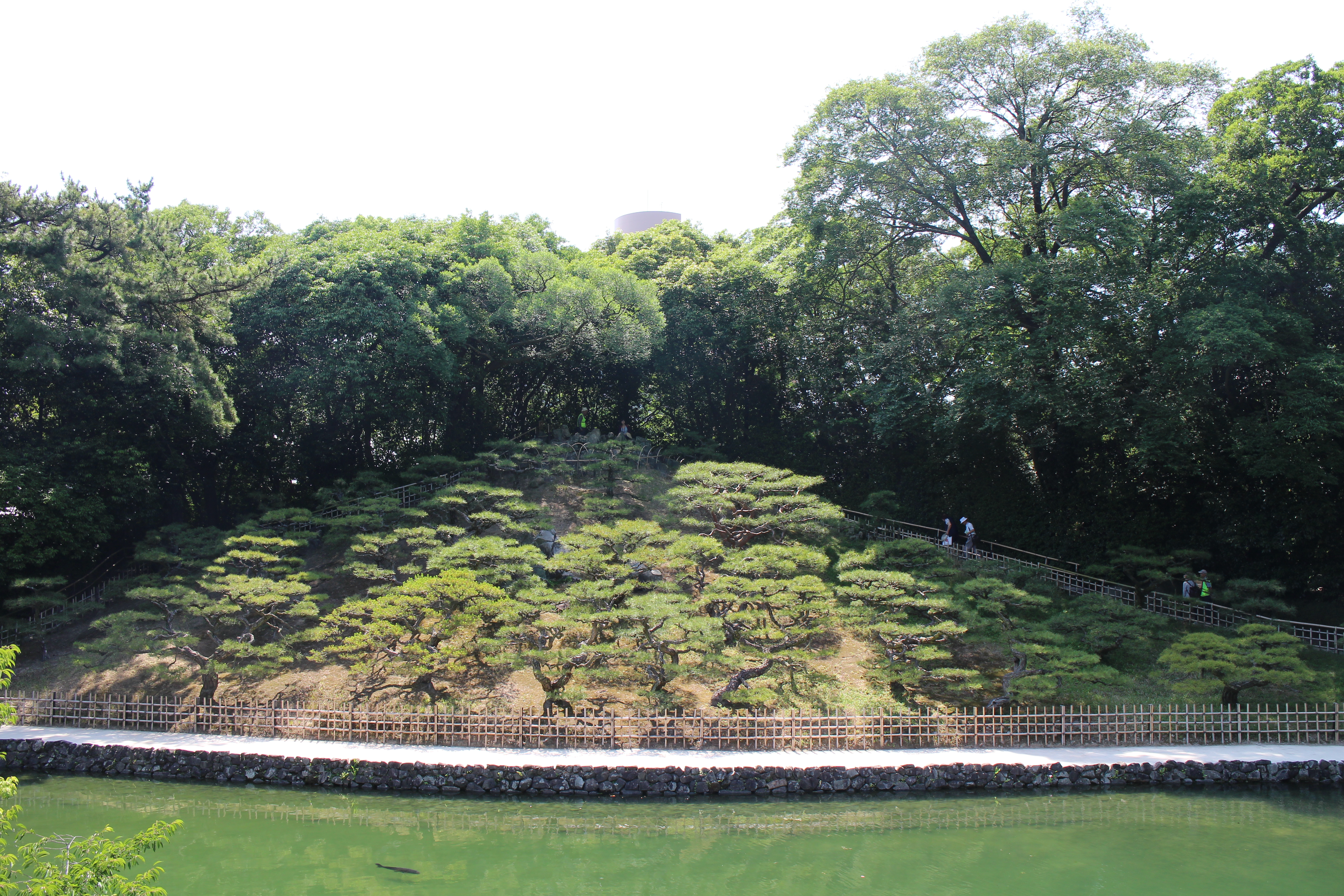

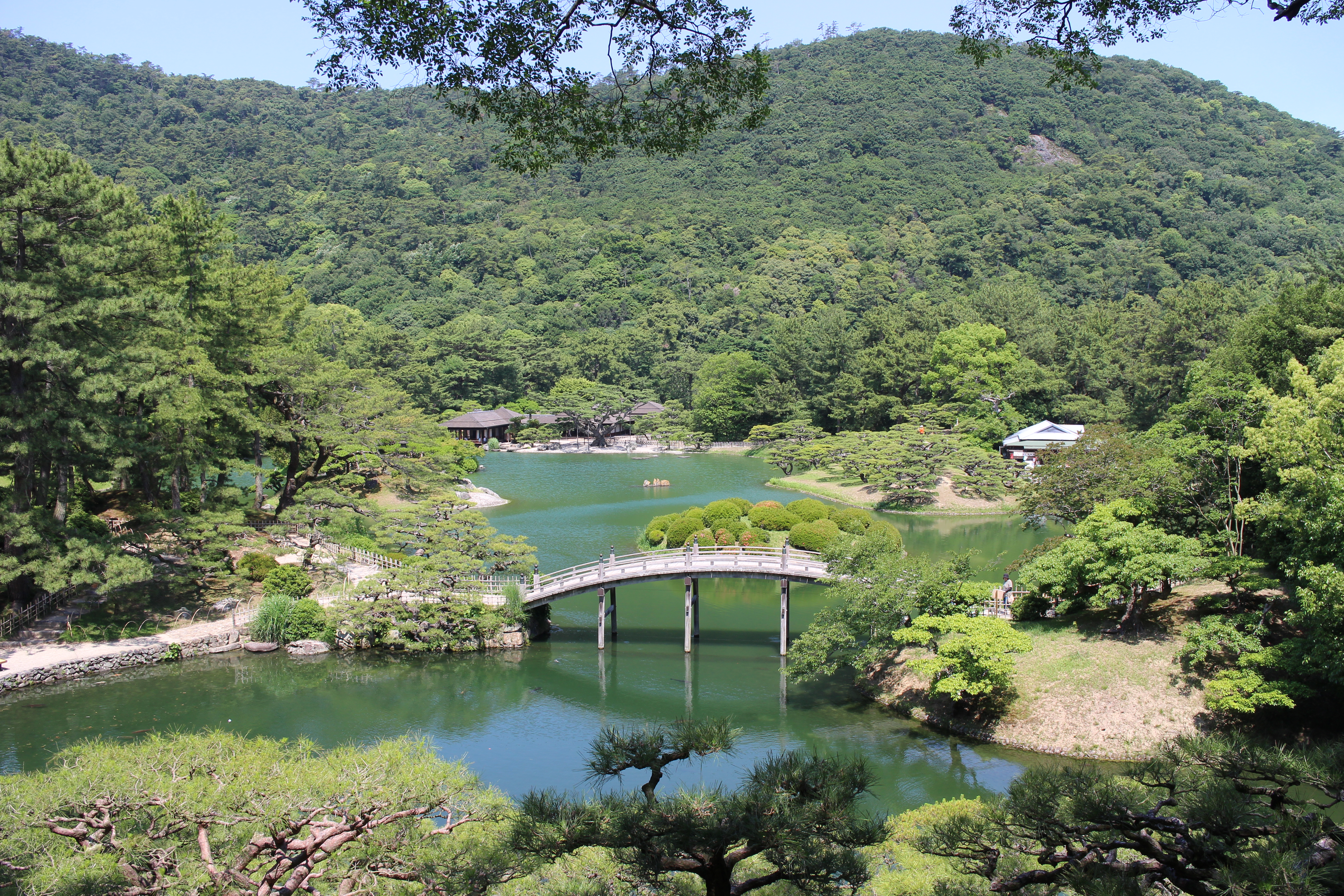

== Access ==
- JR Shikoku: Kōtoku Line, Ritsurin-Kōen-Kitaguchi Station
- Takamatsu-Kotohira Electric Railroad (Kotoden): Ritsurin-Kōen Station
- Kotoden Bus: Ritsurin Kōen Mae stop
- Kōsoku Bus Ritsurin Kōen Mae stop

== See also ==
- List of Special Places of Scenic Beauty, Special Historic Sites and Special Natural Monuments

== Bibliography ==
- Mansfield, Stephen (2011). Japan's Master Gardens - Lessons in Space and Environment (Hardback). Tokyo, Rutland, Singapore: Tuttle. ISBN 978-4-8053-1128-8.
