= Kitachō Station =

Passenger railway station in Takamatsu, Kagawa Prefecture, Japan

T24 Kitachō Station 木太町駅
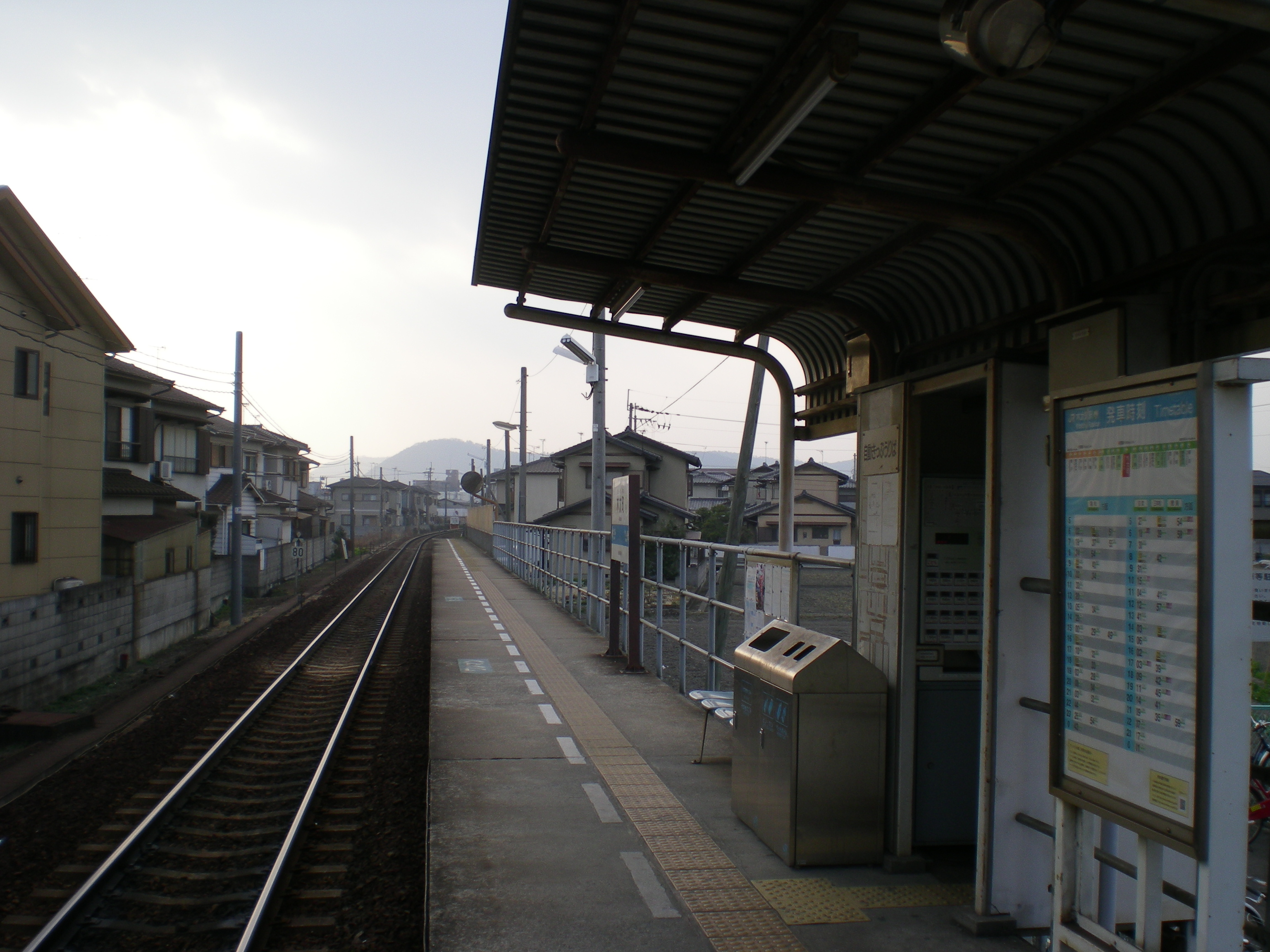
- Kitachō Station in 2008

General information
- Location: 3065-3 Kitamachi, Takamatsu City, Kagawa Prefecture 760-0080; Japan
- Coordinates: 34°19′56″N 134°04′47″E
- Operator: JR Shikoku
- Line: Kōtoku Line
- Distance: 6.7 km (4.2 mi) from Takamatsu
- Platforms: 1 side platform
- Tracks: 1

Construction
- Structure type: At grade
- Cycle facilities: Designated parking area for bikes

Other information
- Status: Unstaffed
- Station code: T24

History
- Opened: 1 November 1986; 39 years ago

Passengers
- FY2019: 688

Services
Preceding station	JR Shikoku	Following station
Ritsurin T25 towards Takamatsu	Kōtoku Line	Yashima T23 towards Tokushima
Uzushio does not stop here
Location
- Location within Kagawa Prefecture Location within Japan

Kitachō Station (木太町駅, Kitachō-eki) is a passenger railway station located in the city of Takamatsu, Kagawa Prefecture, Japan. It is operated by JR Shikoku and has the station number "T24".

== Lines ==
The station is served by the JR Shikoku Kōtoku Line and is located 6.7 km from the beginning of the line at Takamatsu. Only local services stop at the station.

== Layout ==
Kitachō Station consists of a side platform serving a single track. There is no station building and the station is unstaffed but a shelter is provided on the platform for waiting passengers and a "Tickets Corner" (a small shelter housing an automatic ticket vending machine) is installed. A parking area for bicycles is provided near the station entrance.

== History ==
Japanese National Railways (JNR) opened Kitachō Station on 1 November 1986 as a temporary stop on the existing Kōtoku Line. With the privatization of JNR on 1 April 1987, JR Shikoku assumed control and the stop was upgraded to a full station.

== Surrounding area ==
- Takamatsu Municipal Kitakita Elementary School
- Takamatsu University
- Takamatsu Junior College

== See also ==
- List of railway stations in Japan
