= Yashima Station (Kagawa) =

Passenger railway station in Takamatsu, Kagawa Prefecture, Japan

T23 Yashima Station 屋島駅
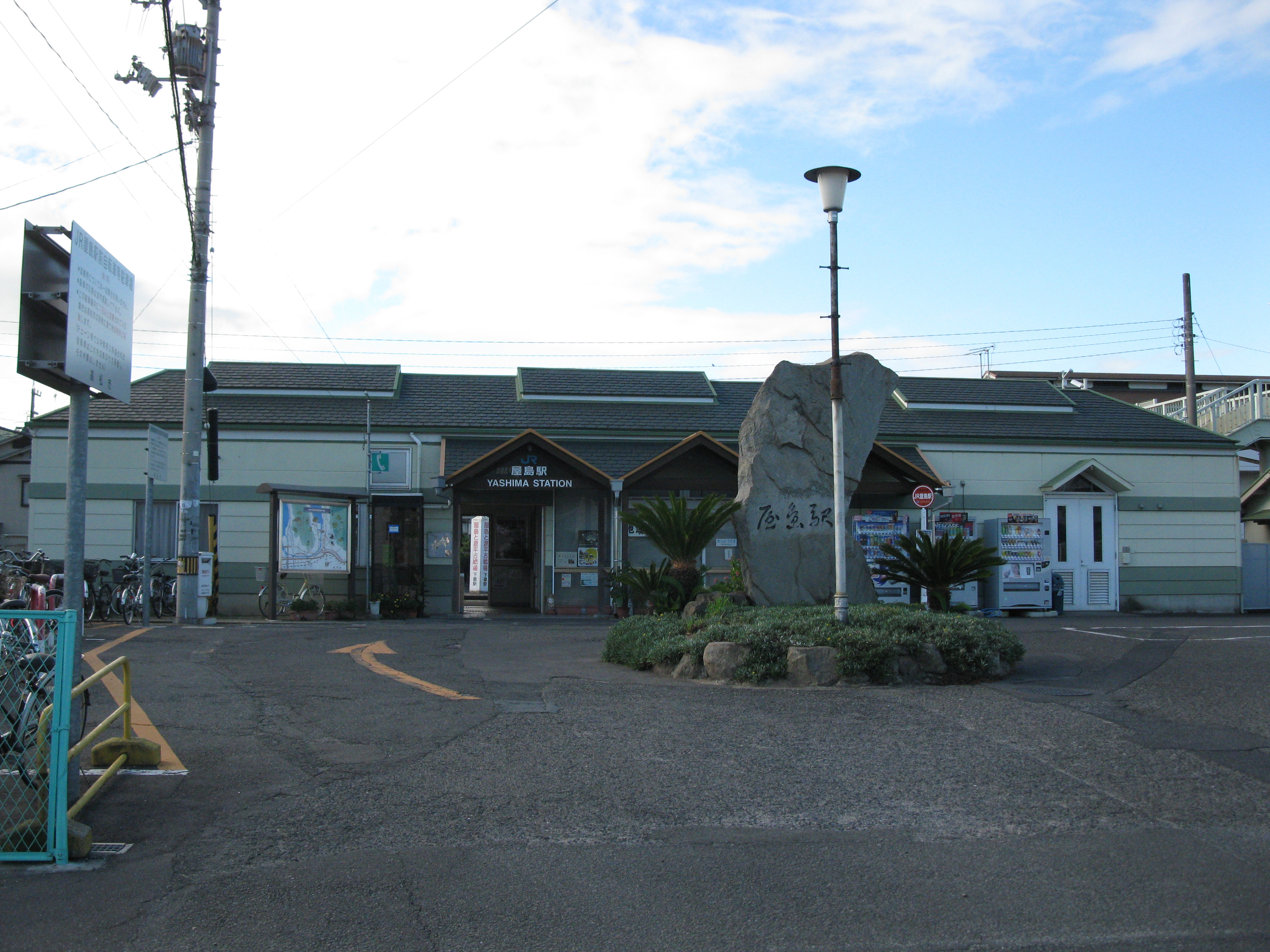
- Yashima Station in 2010

General information
- Location: 88-2 Kirai, Takamatsu-cho, Takamatsu City, Kagawa Prefecture 761-0104; Japan
- Coordinates: 34°20′12″N 134°06′32″E
- Operator: JR Shikoku
- Line: Kōtoku Line
- Distance: 9.5 km (5.9 mi) from Takamatsu
- Platforms: 1 side + 1 island platform
- Tracks: 3 + 1 passing loop

Construction
- Structure type: At grade
- Cycle facilities: Designated parking area for bikes
- Accessible: No - platforms linked by footbridge

Other information
- Status: Staffed (JR Shikoku ticket window)
- Station code: T23
- Website: Official website

History
- Opened: 1 August 1925; 101 years ago

Passengers
- FY2019: 1250

Services
Preceding station	JR Shikoku	Following station
Kitachō T24 towards Takamatsu	Kōtoku Line	Furutakamatsu-Minami T22 towards Tokushima
Limited Express
Ritsurin T25 towards Kojima	Uzushio	Shido T19 towards Tokushima
Location
- Location within Kagawa Prefecture Location within Japan

Yashima Station (屋島駅, Yashima-eki) is a passenger railway station located in the city of Takamatsu, Kagawa Prefecture, Japan. It is operated by JR Shikoku and has the station number "T23".

== Lines ==
The station is served by the JR Shikoku Kōtoku Line and is located 9.5 km from the beginning of the line at Takamatsu. Besides local services, the Uzushio limited express between Okayama, Takamatsu and Tokushima also stops at the station.

== Layout ==
Yashima Station consists of a side platform and an island platform serving three tracks. A station building houses a waiting room and a JR ticket window (without a Midori no Madoguchi facility). Access to the island platform is by means of a footbridge. A passing loop runs on the far side of the island platform beyond track 3. A large designated parking area for bikes is provided outside the station.

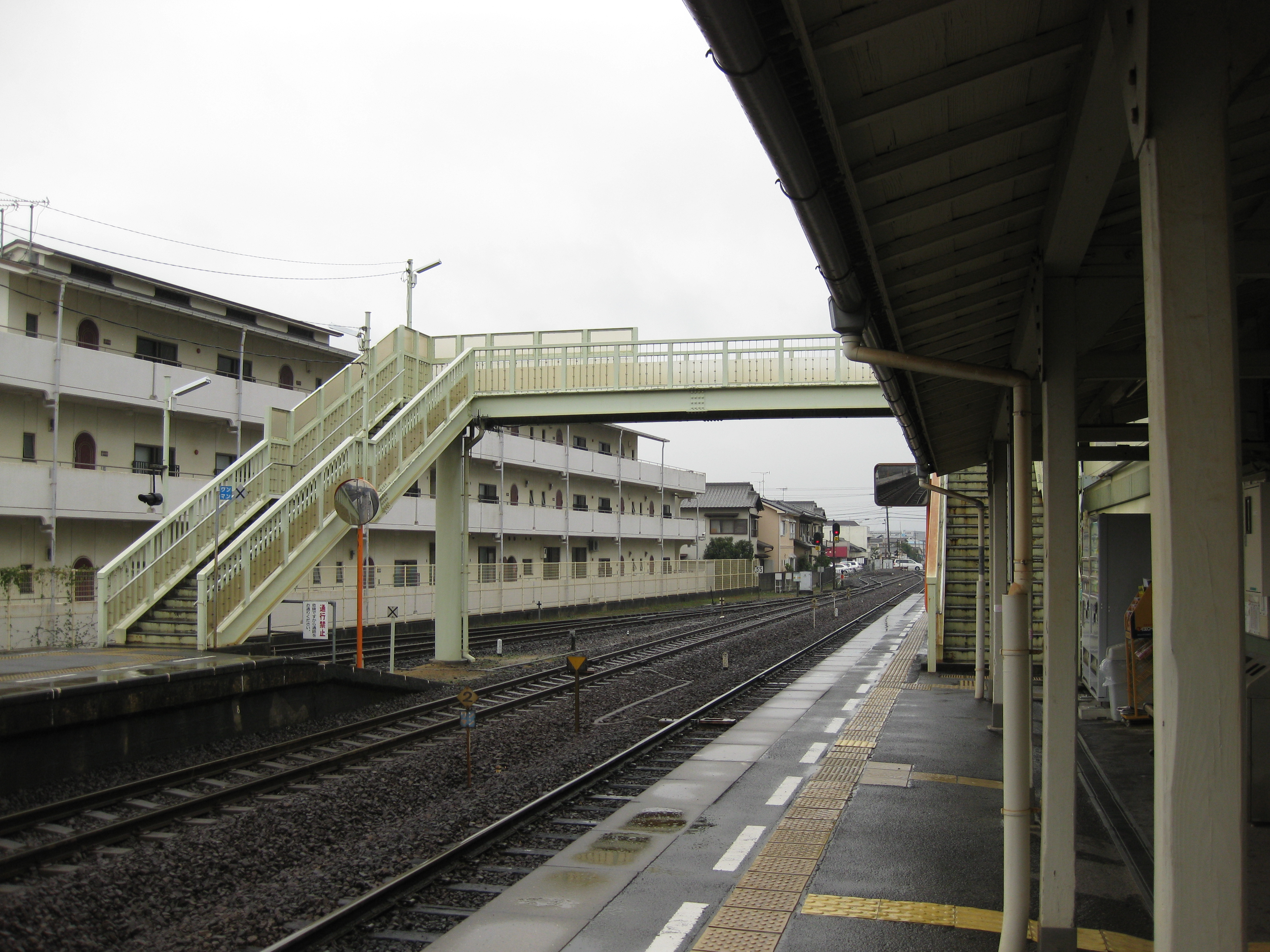
A view of the station platforms and tracks. The passing loop can be seen at the extreme left.

== History ==
Yashima Station was opened on 1 August 1925 as an intermediate stop when the track of the Kōtoku Line was extended eastwards to Shido. At that time the station was operated by Japanese Government Railways, later becoming Japanese National Railways (JNR). With the privatization of JNR on 1 April 1987, control of the station passed to JR Shikoku.

== Surrounding area ==
- Kotoden-Yashima Station
- Yashima-ji
- Takamatsu Municipal Furutakamatsu Elementary School
- Takamatsu Municipal Furutakamatsu Junior High School

== See also ==
- List of railway stations in Japan
