= T20 medium tank =

Series of armored fighting vehicles designed by the United States

Medium tank T20
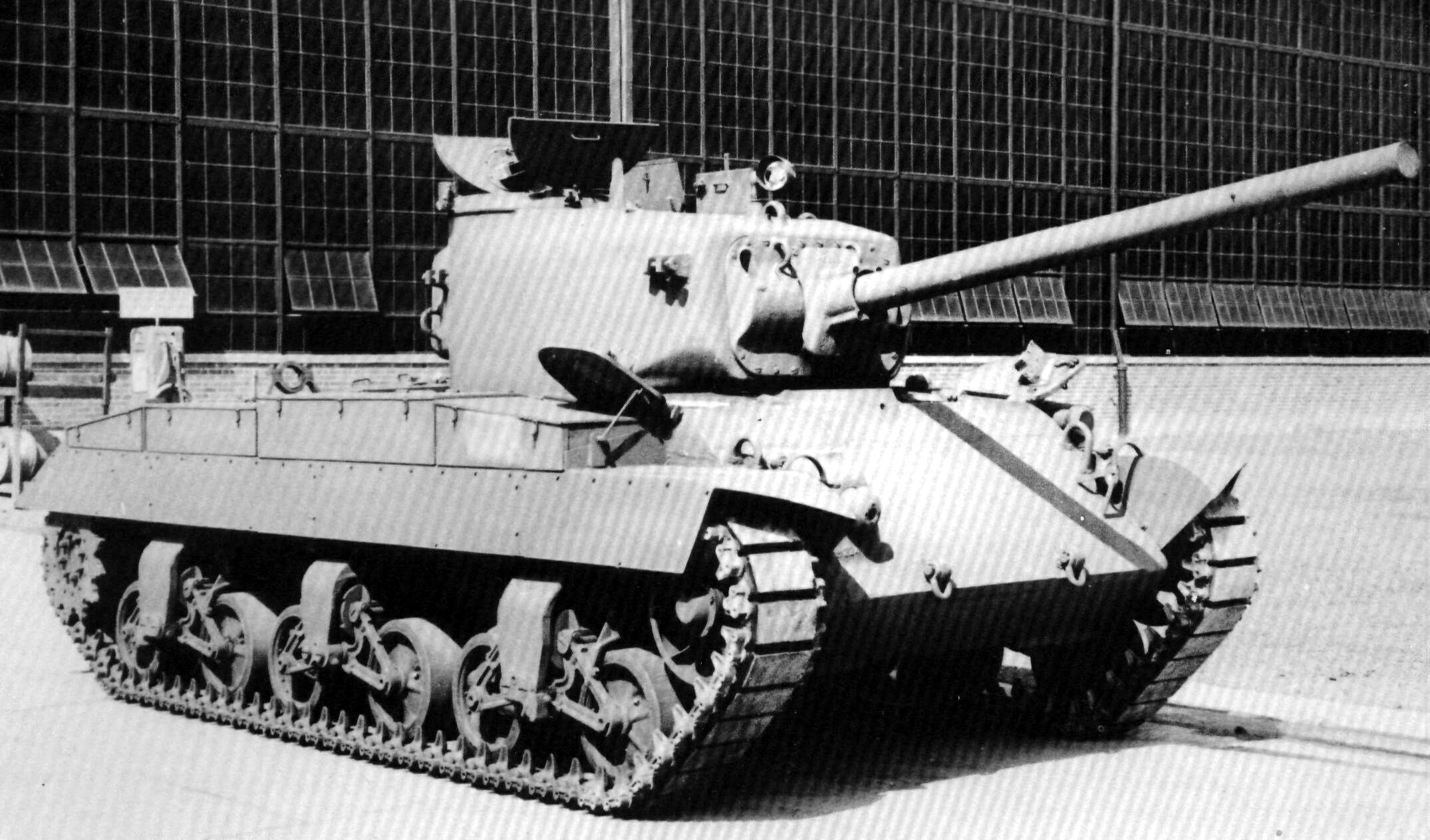
- The T20 with horizontal volute spring suspension
- Type: Medium tank

Production history
- No. built: T20 - 2 pilot T22 - 2 pilot T23 - 248

Specifications
- Mass: 29.83 t (29.36 long tons; 32.88 short tons)
- Length: 5.70 m (18 ft 8 in)
- Width: 3.00 m (9 ft 10 in)
- Height: 2.44 m (8 ft 0 in)
- Crew: 5 (Commander, gunner, loader, driver, co-driver)
- Armor: 62 mm
- Main armament: 76 mm gun M1A1; 70 rounds
- Secondary armament: 2x .30 cal Browning M1919 machine guns 6,000 rounds
- Engine: GAN V-8 petrol
- Power/weight: 17.26/ton
- Suspension: HVSS (Horizontal Volute Spring Suspension)
- Operational range: 160 km (99 mi)
- Maximum speed: 40 km/h (25 mph)

The medium tank T20, medium tank T22 and medium tank T23 were prototype medium tanks, developed by the United States Army during World War II. They were designed as successors to the M4 Sherman. The standard main weapon for production versions of these designs was to be the 76 mm gun M1.

In July 1943, on the basis that the 75 mm-armed M4 was becoming obsolete, the US Army Ordnance Department requested that the 76 mm-gunned T23E3 and T20E3 go into production as the M27 and M27B1. However, the request was rejected and neither design was ever mass-produced. The Army did not consider it necessary to interrupt M4 production for a vehicle for which they did not perceive a requirement and the introduction of the 76 mm gun to the tank force was opposed by the Armored Ground Force.

Successive evolution of the basic design culminated in the M26 Pershing.

== Design and development ==
Almost immediately after the M4 Sherman was standardized, the US Ordnance Department started work on a successor. The Ordnance Department had already been working on a heavily armored infantry tank design for the British, using M4 parts. The new project was started on the 25 May 1942, it was originally designated M4X. The specification was 32 short tons (29 metric tonnes), "automatic" 75mm gun, 4 in (100 mm) of armor and a top speed of 25 mph (40 km/h).

After a wooden mockup produced by Fisher, Ordnance (in agreement with Armored Force Board) set out three pilot models to be built with different combinations of armament but interchangeable turrets. All would use the Ford GAN V-8 engine driving Hydra-matic transmission through a torque converter. The T20 would have the 76mm gun, the T20E1 the automatic 75mm and the T20E2 a 3-inch gun. T20 and T20E1 would be fitted with horizontal volute spring suspension (HVSS) but the T20E2 would have had torsion bar suspension.

Starting with the T20, the Ordnance Department initially developed three series of improved medium tank prototypes, the T20, T22, and T23. The main differences between the T20, T22 and T23 lay in the choice of transmission. The T20 used a torque converter fluid drive, the T22 a 5-speed mechanical drive similar to the M4 drive, and the T23 used an electric drive. All moved the transmission to the rear of the vehicle eliminating the need for a driveshaft running the length of the vehicle. The driveshaft used in the M3 and M4 vehicles forced the turret to be mounted higher increasing the vehicle height.

== T20 series ==
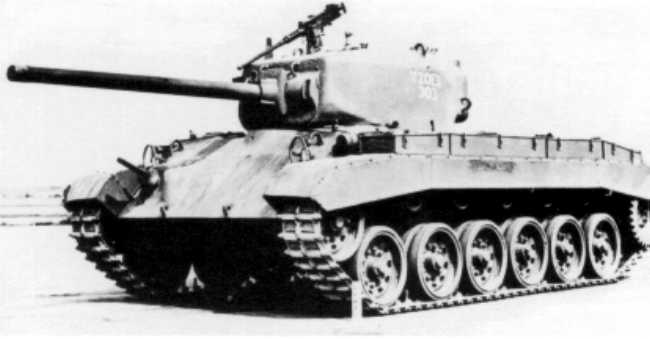
T20E3, which replaced the T20's HVSS with torsion bar suspension

All the T20 models used the Ford GAN V8 engine with Torqmatic torque converter transmission with rear drive sprocket. The hull was all-welded construction and the turrets cast.

T20
76 mm gun M1 and horizontal volute spring suspension. Built by Fisher and completed in June 1943.
T20E1
Planned to have a 75 mm automatic gun and horizontal volute spring suspension but cancelled and turret used on the T22E1.
T20E2
Intended to have 3 inch gun and torsion bar suspension but completed by Fisher with 76mm gun and designated T20E3.
T20E3
76 mm gun and torsion bar suspension

The T20 and T20E3 were tested but the transmission leaked and overheated. Any further work on them was stopped at end of 1944.

== T22 series ==
Work on T22 started in October 1942 when Chrysler were contracted to build pilot tanks that were identical to the T20 including the Ford GAN V8 except for using the M4 Sherman transmission though rear wheel drive rather than positioned in the front of the Sherman's. Both vehicles were built by June 1943 but as with the T20 there were transmission issues and work on the T22 was cancelled in December 1944.

T22
76 mm gun and horizontal volute spring suspension
T22E1
First T22 pilot refitted with the turret built by United Shoe Machinery Corporation for the cancelled T20E1. 75 mm automatic gun and horizontal volute spring suspension The gun was a 75mm M3 on mount M34 which was fed by a hydraulic loader from two magazines – one with AP shells and the other with HE.
T22E3
Equivalent of the T20 with 3-inch gun; cancelled during design stage.

There was only one T22 constructed. The T22E1 was the T22 pilot vehicle re-equipped with the turret originally built for the T20E1. The 75 mm automatic gun was tested in this installation and gave a maximum rate of fire of 20 rounds a minute, but was abandoned in December 1944 on the basis that it was unreliable and larger calibre guns were now the priority.

== T23 series ==
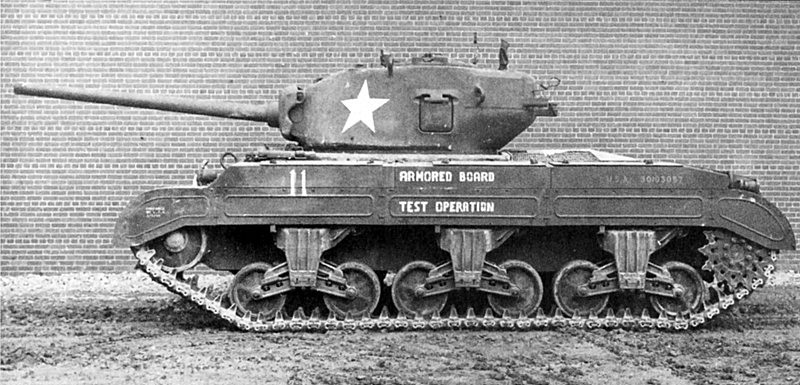
Production T23

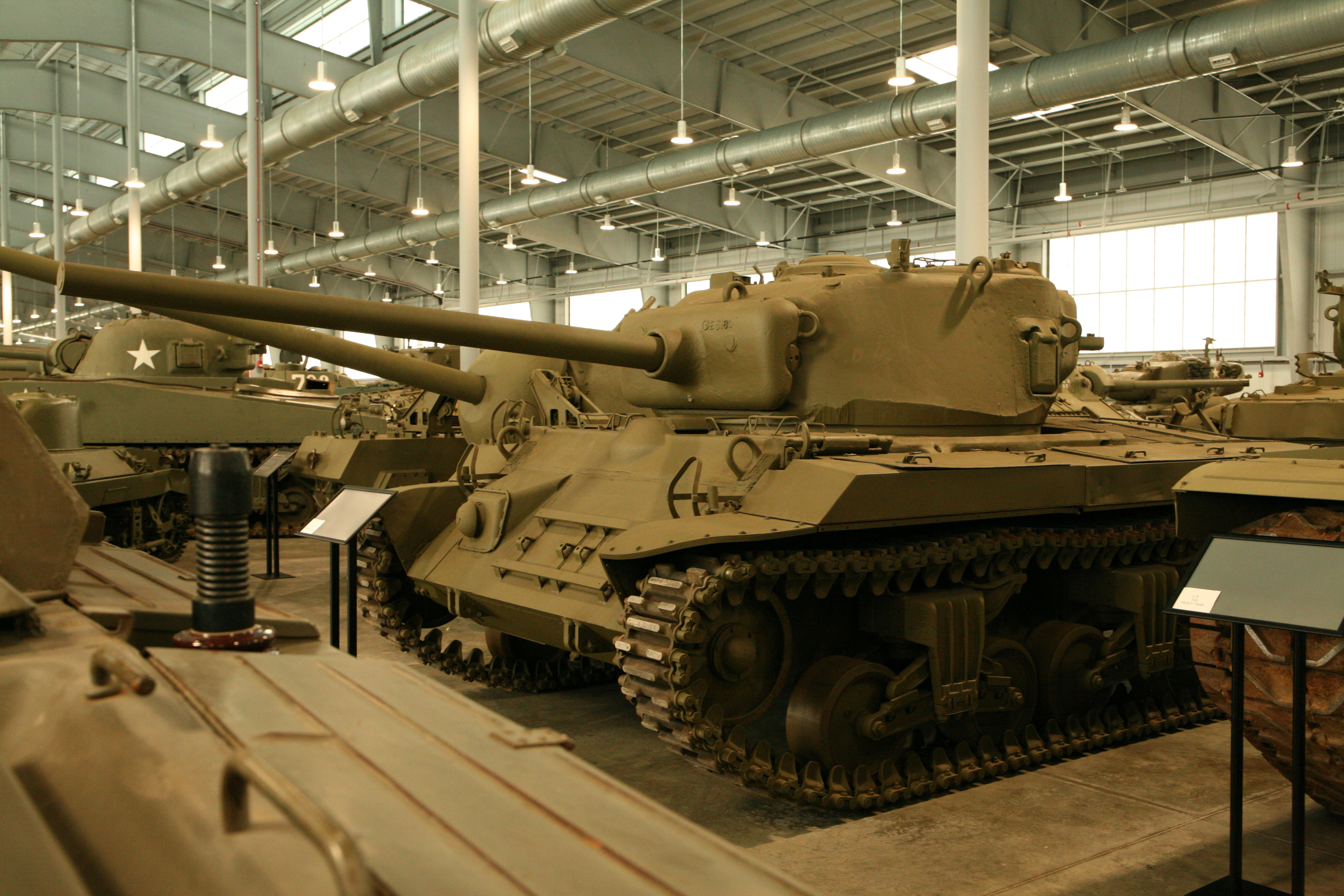
T23 at the U.S. Army Armor and Cavalry Collection, Fort Benning, Georgia in 2023

The T23 design was to be similar to the T22 but using a General Electric supplied electric transmission with M4 tracks and VVS suspension. As with T20 and T22, three pilot models were ordered from Detroit Arsenal with different armament T23 with 76mm, T23E1 with automatic 75mm and T23E2 with 3-inch gun. The 75mm and 3-inch designs were cancelled before completion but the first T23 was completed and entered trials before the T20 or T22 designs; the second was ready by March 1943. The T23 was found to be highly maneuverable.

T23
76 mm gun and vertical volute suspension Electric transmission.
T23E1
automatic 75mm. Cancelled.
T23E2
3-inch gun. Cancelled
T23E3
76 mm gun and torsion bar suspension
T23E4
76 mm gun and horizontal volute suspension. Cancelled

The design was classified "limited procurement" in May 1943 and 250 T23s were ordered; these were built between November 1943 and December 1944 although the design was never standardized or issued to front line units. Production models featured the T80 gun mount and M1A1 76mm gun. The turret would later be used in modified form for 76mm M4 variants. The T23 was not adopted for service partly because of its untried transmission system and partly because the design had poor weight distribution and excessive ground pressure. In an attempt to rectify this, two further variants were ordered, the T23E3 with torsion bar suspension and the T23E4 with horizontal volute suspension. The T23E4 was cancelled before the design was completed, but the T23E3 prototype was completed and the torsion bar suspension was found to have reduced the ground pressure by 20% compared to the T23. Despite cancellation of the T23E4, three T23 tanks (serial numbers 624, 625, and 626) were converted in 1944 to horizontal volute suspension. Mobility trials demonstrated this configuration to be superior to vertical volute but inferior to torsion bar suspension.

== T21 Light Tank ==
In a related development the T21 was proposed as a replacement for the M3 and M5 series light tanks. It was to have been based on the hull and turret design of the T20 but with a maximum armor thickness of 30 mm (1.2 in) it would weigh only 24 short tons (22 t) been armed with the 76 mm gun, used either a torsion bar or use the vertical volute spring suspension of the M7 Medium Tank (originally known as T7 Light Tank).

The design was prepared, but the two planned pilots were never built; Armored Force wanted light tanks to weigh no more than 20 short tons (18 t). Ultimately, the T21 concept was superseded by the T24 program, which was standardized as the M24 Chaffee.

== Further development ==
With standardization of the M27 rejected, the Ordnance Department continued designing improved tanks, this time armed with 90 mm guns. The immediate result of this line of development was the T25 series – essentially a slightly larger version of the T23 – and then the bigger, better protected T26. The T26 further evolved into the T26E3, and was ultimately standardized as the M26 Pershing and accepted into service in 1944.

== See also ==
- M-numbers
- G-numbers (G183)

== Sources ==
- Chamberlain, Peter; Ellis, Chris (1981) [1969], British And American Tanks of World War II (2nd US ed.), Arco
- TM 9-734 Medium Tank T23. War Department. 5 August 1944.
- TM 9-1734A Ordnance Maintenance Tank, Medium, T23: Electric Drive Equipment. War Department. 1944.
- SNL G183
