= T25 medium tank =

T25 Medium tank prototype

Medium Tank T25
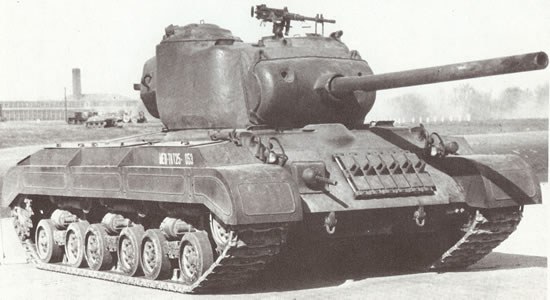
- Type: Medium tank
- Place of origin: United States

Production history
- Manufacturer: Chrysler Engineering Division
- No. built: 2 (T25); 40 (T25E1)
- Variants: T25, T25E1

Specifications
- Length: 7.55 m (24 ft 9 in)
- Width: 3.11 m (10 ft 2 in)
- Crew: 5 (commander, gunner, loader, driver, assistant driver / bow gunner)
- Armor: Hull front: 76 mm (3.0 in); Hull sides: 50 mm (2.0 in); Hull rear: 38 mm (1.5 in); Turret: 68 mm (2.7 in); Mantlet: 89 mm (3.5 in)
- Main armament: 90 mm Gun M3 (50 rounds)
- Secondary armament: 2× .30-06 M1919 Browning (6,000 rounds); 1× .50 cal. M2 Browning (550 rounds)
- Engine: Ford GAN 470 hp (350 kW) (T25); Ford GAF (T25E1)
- Suspension: HVSS (T25); Torsion bar (T25E1)
- Operational range: 161km
- Maximum speed: 40 km/h (25 mph)

The T25 Medium tank was a prototype designed and tested in the United States, in 1944–45. A variant of an earlier series of prototypes, the T20/T22/T23, the T25 was conceived as a possible replacement for both the M4 Sherman Medium tank, and its previously proposed successor, the T23.

Designed between mid-1943 and early 1944, the major innovation of the T25 was the newer and more powerful 90 mm gun M3. Two prototypes were completed and ready for testing in 1944. However, a heavy tank design, the T26 (known later as the M26 Pershing) was instead put into production, also wielding the 90 mm gun M3.

== Production history ==
=== Design ===
The 90 mm gun replaced the 76mm gun used on the M4 and T23. A larger cast turret was designed to fit the new gun. The T25 retained both the coaxial and hull mounted machine guns of the T20, in addition to an M2 Browning mounted on the turret roof.

=== Development ===
The T25 resulted from an idea of upgrading the T23 with a 90 mm gun, an idea likely inspired by the capabilities of German tanks such as the Panther. The original order was for 40 vehicles for testing purposes, all of which were to be converted from existing T23. A pilot model T25 was completed by Chrysler Engineering Division and shipped by Detroit Tank Arsenal to Aberdeen Proving Ground on 21 January 1944.

Development of the design was officially abandoned, in favor of the T26 in 1945.

== Sources ==
- Hunnicutt, R. P. (15 Oct 1999). Pershing: A History of the Medium Tank T20 Series. Random House Publishing. ISBN 978-1626541672.
