= Shōwachō Station (Kagawa) =

Railway station in Takamatsu, Kagawa prefecture, Japan

T27 Shōwachō Station 昭和町駅
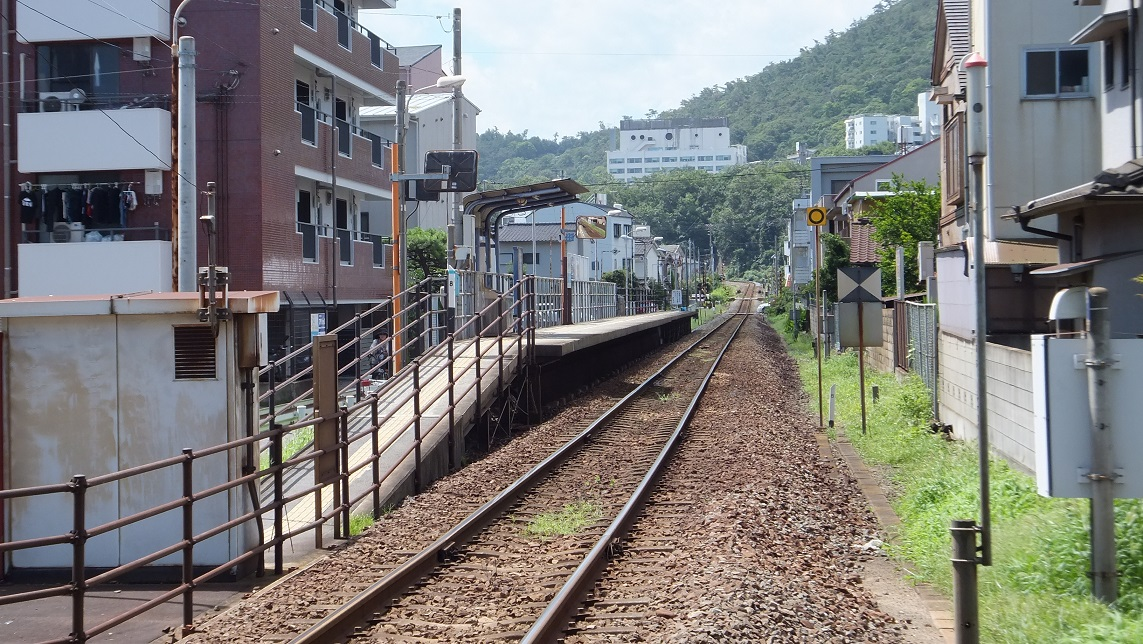
- Shōwachō station in 2015

General information
- Location: 1-4 Shōwachō, Takamatsu City, Kagawa Prefecture 760-0014; Japan
- Coordinates: 34°20′39″N 134°01′56″E
- Operator: JR Shikoku
- Line: Kōtoku Line
- Distance: 1.5 km (0.93 mi) from Takamatsu
- Platforms: 1 side platform
- Tracks: 1

Construction
- Structure type: At grade
- Accessible: Yes - ramp leads up to platform

Other information
- Status: Unstaffed
- Station code: T27

History
- Opened: 23 March 1987; 39 years ago

Passengers
- FY2019: 1,032

Services
Preceding station	JR Shikoku	Following station
Takamatsu T28 Terminus	Kōtoku Line	Ritsurin-Kōen-Kitaguchi T26 towards Tokushima
Uzushio does not stop here
Location
- Location within Kagawa Prefecture Location within Japan

Shōwachō Station (昭和町駅, Shōwachō-eki) is a passenger railway station located in the city of Takamatsu, Kagawa Prefecture, Japan. It is operated by JR Shikoku and has the station number "T27".

== Lines ==
The station is served by the JR Shikoku Kōtoku Line and is located 1.5 km from the beginning of the line at Takamatsu. Only local services stop at the station.

== Layout ==
Shōwachō Station consists of a side platform serving a single track. There is no station building and the station is unstaffed but a shelter is provided on the platform and a "Tickets Corner" (a small shelter housing an automatic ticket vending machine) is installed. A ramp leads up to the platform from the access road.

== History ==
Japanese National Railways (JNR) opened Shōwachō Station on 23 March 1987 as an additional stop on the existing Kōtoku Line. Just a few days later, on 1 April 1987, JNR was privatized and control of the station passed to JR Shikoku.

== Surrounding area ==
- TKagawa University Saiwaimachi Campus (Headquarters/Faculty of Education/Faculty of Economics/Faculty of Law)
- Takamatsu City Historical Museum

Kan Kikuchi Memorial Museum

== See also ==
- List of railway stations in Japan
