= Ritsurin-Kōen-Kitaguchi Station =

Railway station in Kagawa Prefecture, Japan

T26 Ritsurin-Kōen-Kitaguchi Station 栗林公園北口駅
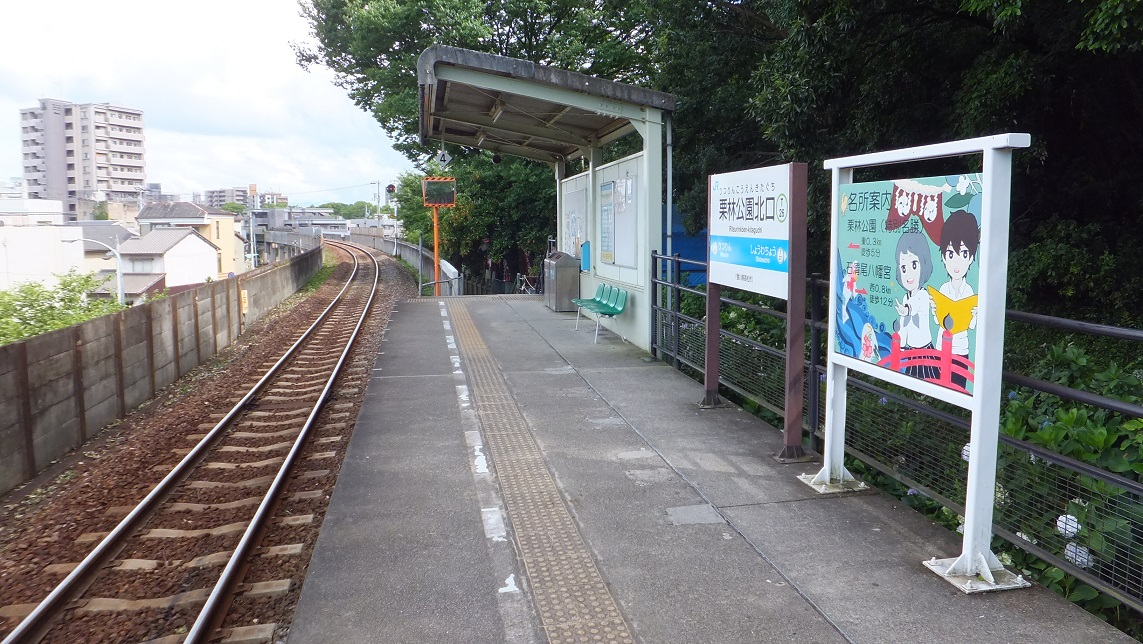
- Ritsurin-Kōen-Kitaguchi Station in 2015

General information
- Location: 10 Nakanochō, Takamatsu City, Kagawa Prefecture 760-0008; Japan
- Coordinates: 34°20′03″N 134°02′30″E
- Operator: JR Shikoku
- Line: Kōtoku Line
- Distance: 3.2 km (2.0 mi) from Takamatsu
- Platforms: 1 side platform
- Tracks: 1

Construction
- Structure type: Elevated
- Parking: Under elevated structure
- Cycle facilities: Under elevated structure
- Accessible: No - steps lead up to platform

Other information
- Status: Unstaffed
- Station code: T27

History
- Opened: 1 November 1986; 39 years ago

Passengers
- FY2019: 928

Services
| Preceding station | JR Shikoku | Following station |
|---|---|---|
| Shōwachō T27 towards Takamatsu | Kōtoku Line | Ritsurin T25 towards Tokushima |
Uzushio does not stop here
Location
- Location within Kagawa Prefecture Location within Japan

Ritsurin-Kōen-Kitaguchi Station (栗林公園北口駅, Ritsurin-Kōen-Kitaguchi-eki) is a passenger railway station located in the city of Takamatsu, Kagawa Prefecture, Japan. It is operated by JR Shikoku and has the station number "T26".

== Lines ==
The station is served by the JR Shikoku Kōtoku Line and is located 3.2 km from the beginning of the line at Takamatsu. Only local services stop at the station.

== Layout ==
Ritsurin-Kōen-Kitaguchi Station consists of a side platform serving a single elevated track. There is no station building and the station is unstaffed but a shelter is provided on the platform for waiting passengers and automatic ticket vending machines are installed. A ramp leads up to the platform from the access road. Parking for cars and bicycles is available under the elevated structure.

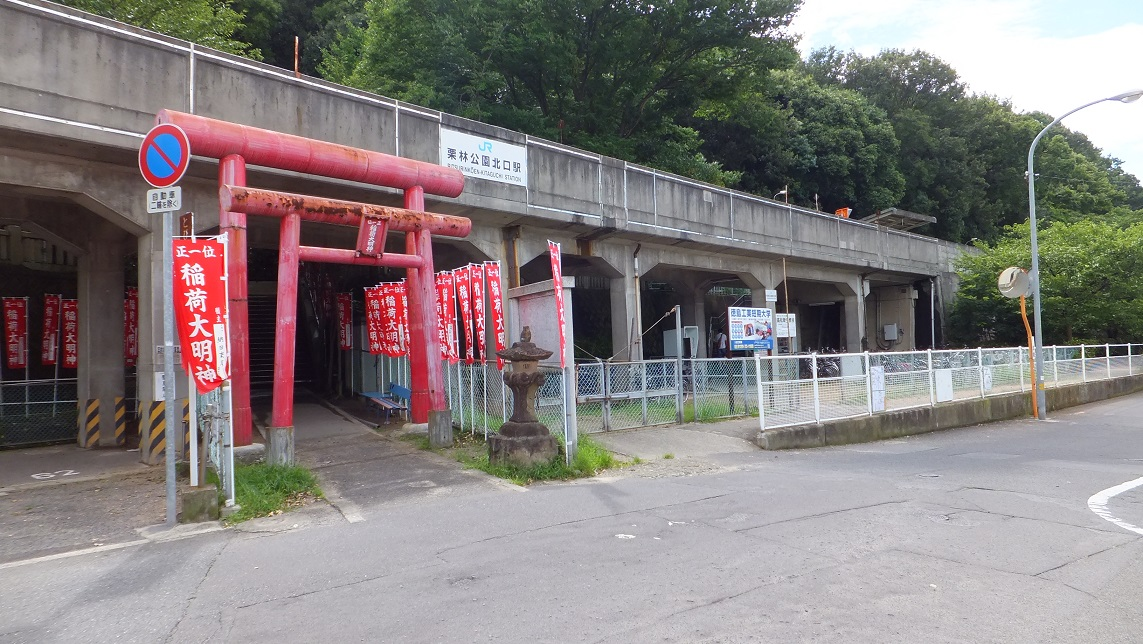
A view of the station entrance and elevated structure. The red torii is not the entrance but leads to a Shinto shrine. The station entrance is to the right of it.

== History ==
Japanese National Railways (JNR) opened Ritsurin-Kōen-Kitaguchi Station on 1 November 1986 as a temporary stop on the existing Kōtoku Line. With the privatization of JNR on 1 April 1987, JR Shikoku assumed control and the stop was upgraded to a full station.

== Surrounding area ==
- Ritsurin Garden
- Iwashio Hachiman Shrine
- Eimei High School

== See also ==
- List of railway stations in Japan
