= 76 mm gun M1 =

American tank gun

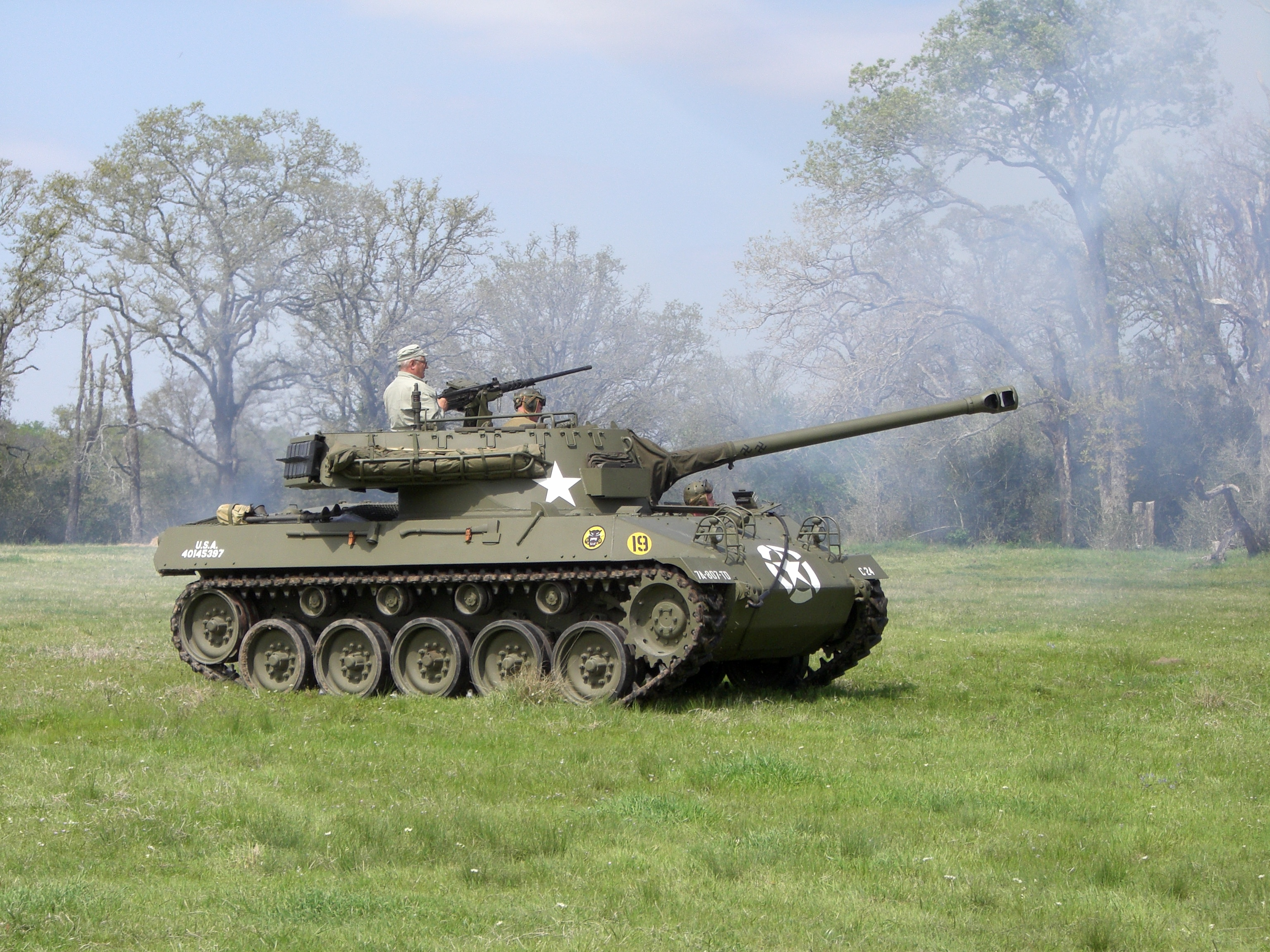
- An M18 Hellcat armed with a 76 mm gun
- Type: Tank gun
- Place of origin: United States

Service history
- Used by: United States
- Wars: World War II; Korean War; Suez Crisis; Six-Day War; Yom Kippur War; Indo-Pakistani war of 1965; Indo-Pakistani war of 1971; Uganda–Tanzania War; Croatian War of Independence; Bosnian War

Production history
- Designer: US Ordnance Department

Specifications
- Mass: 1,141 lb (517.55 kg)
- Barrel length: 52 calibres
- Shell: Fixed QF 76.2×539mm R (R/93mm)
- Caliber: 76.2 millimetres (3.00 in)

The 76 mm gun M1 was an American World War II–era tank gun developed by the United States Ordnance Department in 1942 to supplement the 75 mm gun on the basic Medium tank M4. It was also used to arm the M18 Hellcat tank destroyer.

Although the gun was tested in early August 1942 and classified on 18 August 1942, it was not until August 1943 that the Ordnance Department developed a mounting for the M4 tank that the tank forces would accept. It was not accepted for combat until July 1944. In January 1943, the decision was made to mount the 76 mm on the vehicle that would become the M18. By May 1944, it was being combat tested as the T70. The gun would be replaced upon the 90 mm entering service.

== Design and development ==
Before the United States had battle experience against heavily armored German tanks, the development of a weapon superior to the 75 mm gun was anticipated. The original Ordnance Department specifications of 11 September 1941 for the M4 tank allowed for the mounting of numerous weapons including the 3 inch gun. The first specimens of the weapon that was to become the 76 mm Gun M1 were being evaluated in August 1942 while the U.S. did not enter the ground war in the European-African-Middle Eastern region until Operation Torch in November 1942. (Note: The first 75mm guns were used in combat with British forces (in the M3 Medium tank) earlier in 1942)

The 3 inch gun, based on the 3-inch gun M1918 anti-aircraft gun, was considered too large and heavy at about 1,990 lb (900 kg) for mounting in the M4 tank. New stronger steels were used to create a weapon of similar performance weighing about 1,200 lb (540 kg). It was a new gun with a breech similar to that of the 75 mm M3 Gun but with a new tube (barrel and cartridge chamber) design to accommodate a new cartridge. It fired the same projectiles as the 3-inch Gun M1918 3-inch (76 mm) M7 gun mounted on the 3in Gun Motor Carriage M10 tank destroyer and towed 3-inch Gun M5 anti-tank gun, but from a different cartridge case. The "76-mm" designation was chosen to help keep the supply of ammunition from being confused between the two guns. The 76 mm also differed in that successive models received a muzzle brake and faster rifle twist.

Aberdeen Proving Ground began evaluations of the first test guns, designated the T1, around 1 August 1942. The first test guns had a bore length of 57 calibers and when tested on an M4 tank; it was found that the long barrel caused balance problems. Another T1 test gun was produced with the barrel shortened to 52 calibers and a counterweight added to the breech guard to improve balance.

By 17 August, the Ordnance Department had classified the test gun with the shorter barrel as the 76-mm M1 and set up the precedent for the designation of M4 tanks armed with the gun to include "(76M1)".

Tests of production M1 guns revealed that the gun with its counterweight also had issues with binding when trying to rotate the turret when the tank was resting at a steep angle. An 800 lb (360 kg) storage box was added to the turret rear to improve balance, with evaluations held in early 1943 and the final report tendered in April 1943. This worked, but was rejected by the Armored Force due to the turret being cramped.

A more satisfactory mounting was found in August 1943 by utilizing the turret design of the T23 tank on the M4 chassis to carry the 76 mm gun. The 76 mm M1A1 version of the gun was then created, having a longer recoil surface to also help with balance by permitting the placement of the trunnions further to the front.

== Production and tactical doctrine ==
By August 1943, the M4 tank armed with the 76 mm gun in the modified T23 turret was finally ready for production. A proposal was made by the Armored Force for a test run of 1,000 tanks for combat trials and, if that was successful, then devoting all M4 tank manufacturing capacity to those armed with the 76 mm gun. This was changed to a rate that would equip 1/3 of the M4 tanks with the 76 mm gun.

The production proposal was part of a memo in September 1943 pointing out various flaws of the gun that made it less desirable for tank use: muzzle blast, a weaker high explosive shell, more awkward ammunition handling, and ammunition storage. Summed up, the 76 mm offered about 1 inch (25 millimetres) of added armor penetrating power for a loss of some high explosive firepower. In a meeting in April 1944 held to discuss the assignment of the first production M4(76M1) tanks received in Britain to units, a presentation comparing the 76 mm to the 75 mm went over similar points, adding that the 76 mm was more accurate, but did not yet have an appropriate smoke round.

=== Muzzle blast ===
The muzzle blast of early 76 mm guns obscured the target with smoke and dust. This could prevent the gunner from seeing where the projectile struck. The Ordnance Department initially reduced the amount of smoke by using a long primer that gave a more complete burn of the propellant before it exited the barrel. The revised ammunition began to be issued for use in August 1944. Muzzle brakes, that redirected the blast left and right, were tested in January 1944 and authorized in February 1944, with production starting in June 1944. Mid-production guns (M1A1C) were threaded for a muzzle brake, with the threads covered by a protector cap. Enough muzzle brakes were produced to allow them to be released onto M4 production lines in the fall.

For those vehicles that did not have a muzzle brake, once the Armored Force began to accept M4s, it was recommended that tank commanders stand outside the tank and "spot" the strike of rounds to guide the gunner.

=== High-explosive capacity ===
The situation with the high-explosive shell was that the 3 inch M42 projectile for the 76 mm gun carried a filler of about 0.9 lb (0.41 kg) of explosives while the 75 mm gun M48 high explosive projectile carried 1.5 lb (0.68 kg). Far more high explosive ammunition was used by tankers than armor piercing types, the proportions being about 70% HE, 20% AP and 10% smoke overall, The ratio could vary by unit: From 3 August – 31 December 1944, the 13th Tank Battalion fired 55 rounds of M62 APC-T armor piercing versus 19,634 rounds of M42 high explosive.

== Types of ammunition (AP) ==
The 76mm had many variations of ammunition, like the M62 APCBC, it weighed 11.2kg (24.8lb), and traveled up to 792m/s (2600ft/s). The 76mm also had a M93 HVAP shell available, which at point blank could penetrate 201-218mm (8.6in) at 0 degrees, and from 2000 meters, 132mm (5.2in) The 76mm had an option for a M79 AP solid shot round, at point blank, it could penetrate 129mm at 0 degrees, and at 2000 meters, 85mm of penetration, all for RHA.

=== Smoke ammunition ===
The M88 smoke round for the 76 mm provided a "curtain" of smoke. The tankers found the 75 mm M64 WP (White Phosphorus) smoke projectile useful not only for providing smoke coverage but also attacking targets including enemy tanks. Some units equipped with the 76 mm preferred to maintain a 75 mm armed tank on hand to provide the M88 WP projectile.

=== Round size ===
It was thought that the longer and heavier 76 mm might impede handling inside the tank's turret, slowing the rate of fire. This may have been more of a concern than was warranted: on 22 April 1945, the crew of an M4 76 mm crew encountered an unidentified vehicle – which was actually a British scout car – in an ambush position, and the "76 roared twice in rapid succession". The British gunner stated that his vehicle had been destroyed, "before I could lay my hand on the trigger".

It was also thought that the longer 76 mm would reduce ammunition capacity. The 76 mm was first tested on the M4A1 series tank which carried 90 rounds of 75 mm ammunition, while most other models carried 97 rounds of 75 mm. The 76 mm cartridge reduced this to 83 rounds. By late 1943, the Army had adopted the wet storage system of water containers among the rounds, to reduce fires and for the 76 mm gun this provided 71 rounds of ammunition, while the 75 mm could carry 104 rounds. Storage depended on organization: The 76-mm T72 Gun Motor Carriage, designed to mount the 76-mm on the M10 GMC chassis in a T23 turret lightened for the job, carried 99 rounds (but not in wet storage).

== Operational history ==
=== US service ===
The 76 mm gun saw first use in a test batch of M18 Hellcat gun motor carriages in Italy in May 1944, under their development designation T70. The moderate performance of the 76 mm gun by 1944 standards was one of three reasons the plans for M18 production were cut from 8,986 to 2,507, of which 650 were converted to unarmed utility vehicles. An experiment was performed mounting the 90-mm armed M36 turret on an M18 to provide more firepower than the 76-mm.

The first M4 tanks armed with 76 mm guns intended for combat were produced in January 1944. Tanks equipped with the gun began arriving in Britain in April 1944. The issue with muzzle blast had not been addressed and higher-level commanders had doubts about the use of, let alone need for, the new weapon. The medium-velocity 75 mm M3 gun, which first armed the standard M4 Sherman, was quite capable of dealing with most of the German armored fighting vehicles met in 1942 and 1943, and had better high explosive capability and fewer issues with muzzle blast. It was not until July 1944 that a call for M4s armed with 76 mm guns was put out in France after unexpectedly high losses by US tank units and the arrival of numerous Panther tanks on the US sector of the front.

Deliveries of the 76-mm armed tanks lagged such that by January 1945 they made up only 25% of the tanks in Europe. Plans were made by field units to directly replace the 75s on some tanks using a weight welded to the turret rear to balance it. A prototype was built, but the supply of ready-made tanks increased and that project ended.

The 75 mm armed M4 tanks were never completely replaced during the war with some units in Europe still had about a 50/50 mix. Units in Italy readily accepted the 76 mm, but were never shipped as many as desired. The US units in the Pacific Theater relied mainly on the 75 mm gun. The 76 mm-armed M18 did see use in the Pacific late in the war.

=== Performance ===
Crew members of destroyed M4A3 tanks reported direct hits with 76 mm tank fire bouncing off turret and front slope plates of enemy tank, which is further proof of inability of present medium tanks to successfully fight the German Mark VI tank.

— Unit History, 781st Tank Battalion pages 9 of 47, 1945-01-19

The 76 mm M1, while an improvement over the previous 75 mm, had disappointing performance against the front armor of the Panther tank and upgraded models of the Panzer IV Ausf. H/J. The other arcs did not present a problem. The cause of this was the M62A1 APC round issued with the gun. Another issue surfaces on detailed analysis: a change induced by the problem with the M18 turret and the weight of the original 76/57 development gun. These caused the M18 turret to be strained by the forward weight of the barrel. In production, the 76mm M1 was shortened to 52 calibers to address this issue. The result was a loss in velocity and this also affected the anti-armor performance of the shell. In response to the lack of performance and displeasure expressed at high levels at the lack of performance, a new shell was developed. The 76 mm M93 High-Velocity, Armor-Piercing Tracer (HVAP-T) was a large improvement being an Armor Piercing Composite Rigid shot, where the full bore, lightweight outer shell contained a slug of tungsten alloy. This improved velocity, and thus penetration, but the APCR slowed faster than the AP shot or APHE shell, such that penetration dropped below that of the previous two rounds at around 1,500 yards. The American APCR data seems to indicate that US designs were superior to German and their Soviet copies in retaining their velocity to longer ranges. The US Army did not adopt the APDS shot until the middle 1950s as the British designs were less accurate, having significant problems of dispersion from point of aim.

In the ETO, armor engagements took place at ranges up to 890 yards. The shell brought Panzer IV turret penetration to 1,850 yards. The Panther remained immune in the frontal arc. The side and rear arcs remained vulnerable out to 2,500 yards. What was missing to achieve the penetration at 890 yards that the US Army desired against the Panther was 500 fps in velocity, 3,400 fps vs. the required 3,900 fps.

=== British service ===
The UK had developed a more effective anti-tank gun before the 76 mm gun became widely available. Although only slightly longer at 55 calibers, their Ordnance QF 17 pounder (76.2 mm) anti-tank gun had a much larger 76.2×583mmR cartridge case, which used about 5.5 lb (2.5 kg) more propellant. The anti-tank performance of the 76 mm was inferior to the British 17-pounder, more so if the latter was using APDS discarding sabot rounds, though with that ammunition the 17-pounder was less accurate than the 76 mm. The 17-pounder was also much larger and had a longer recoil than the 76 mm, which required a redesign of the turret and, despite this, made the turret very cramped. The 17-pounder also had a less effective HE round. The 76 mm gunned Shermans supplied to the British were only used in Italy or by the Polish 1st Armoured Division in north-west Europe. The British and Commonwealth units in north-west Europe supported their 75 mm gunned Shermans with 17-pounder armed Sherman Fireflies.

=== Soviet service ===
The first 76-mm-armed Shermans started to reach Red Army units in late summer 1944. In 1945, some units were standardized to depend mostly on them, transferring their T-34s to other units. Parts of the Polish First Army also briefly used M4A2 (76 mm) tanks, borrowed from the Red Army after heavy losses in the conquest of Danzig.

=== After World War II ===
==== Korea ====
By the end of 1950, more than 500 76mm gun M4A3E8 tanks were in Korea. These 76 mm-armed Shermans served well in the Korean War and, having better crew training and gun optics, had little problem piercing the armor of North Korean-manned T-34/85 tanks when firing HVAP rounds, which were amply supplied to units. Some 76mm-armed M4s and M18s were distributed around the world and used by other countries post-war. The 76mm gun was sometimes replaced by a more powerful weapon in service with other nations after World War II.

==== Israel ====
France delivered 76mm-gunned Sherman tanks to Israel, which used them in Operation Kadesh against Egypt in 1956 and in the 1967 Six-Day War, particularly in the conquest of Jerusalem. Some were still used as bulldozer tanks in the Yom Kippur War in 1973.

==== The Balkans ====
Some M4A3E4s, retrofitted with the M1A1 76mm gun, as well as a few M18s, were used by various sides during the civil conflicts of former Yugoslavia during the 1990s.

==== India and Pakistan ====
Pakistan bought 547 M4A1E6(76)s during the 1950s and used them in 1965 and 1971 Indo-Pakistani Wars with neighbouring India, which also fielded Sherman tanks (M4A3E4s).

==== Uganda ====
Uganda purchased a few ex-Israeli M4A1(76)Ws and used them during the Idi Amin regime up until the Uganda–Tanzania War.

== Variants ==
- T1: Originally 57 calibers long gun, reduced to 52 calibers after tests in effort to improve balance
- M1: 52 calibers long version of gun adopted for use
- M1A1: M1 with longer recoil surface to allow it to be mounted on trunions placed 12 inches further forward
- M1A1C: M1A1 threaded for muzzle brake
- M1A2: M1A1C with rifling twist changed from 1:40 calibers to 1:32 calibers

A muzzle brake was tested in January 1944, authorized in February 1944 with production starting June 1944. Not all guns received them. The threads of those without a brake were covered by a protector visible in many pictures.

From 1943, at the instigation of the head of the Armored Force General Jacob Devers, US Ordnance worked on a towed anti-tank gun based on the barrel of the M1, known as "76 mm gun T2 on carriage T3". Later interest in the project declined and the program was officially cancelled in 1945.

== Ammunition ==
While the 76 mm had less High Explosive (HE) and smoke performance than the 75 mm, the higher-velocity 76 mm gave better anti-tank performance, with firepower similar to many of the armored fighting vehicles it encountered, particularly the Panzer IV tank and StuG assault gun vehicles. Using the M62 APC round, the 76 mm gun penetrated 109 mm (4.3 in) of armor at 0° obliquity at 1,000 m (3,300 ft), with a muzzle velocity of 792 m/s (2,600 ft/s). The HVAP round was able to penetrate 178 mm (7.0 in) at 1,000 m (3,300 ft), with a muzzle velocity of 1,036 m/s (3,400 ft/s).

Round summary
Projectile	Complete round	Projectile weight	Filler/core	Muzzle velocity	Range
M42A1 HE	22.11 lb (10.03 kg)	12.87 lb (5.84 kg)	0.86 lb (0.39 kg)	2,700 ft/s (820 m/s)	14,650 yd (13,400 m)
M62A1 APC	24.55 lb (11.14 kg)	15.43 lb (7.00 kg)	0.144 lb (0.065 kg)	2,600 ft/s (790 m/s)	16,100 yd (14,700 m)
M79 AP	24.24 lb (11.00 kg)	15 lb (6.8 kg)	None	2,600 ft/s (790 m/s)	12,770 yd (11,680 m)
M88 Smoke	13.43 lb (6.09 kg)	7.6 lb (3.4 kg)	3.3 lb (1.5 kg)	900 ft/s (270 m/s)	2,000 yd (1,800 m)
T4 (M93) HVAP (APCR)		7.6 lb (3.4 kg)	3.9 lb (1.8 kg)	3,400 ft/s (1,000 m/s)	

The M42A1 High Explosive shell contained a 0.86 lb (0.39 kg) explosive filler of TNT or a 0.85 lb (0.39 kg) mixture of 0.08 lb (0.036 kg) of cast TNT and 0.77 lb (0.35 kg) 50/50 Amatol. A reduced charge load existed with a velocity of 1,550 ft/s (470 m/s) and range of 8,805 yd (8,051 m).

The standard M62A1 Armor Piercing Capped projectile was of the APCBC design.

The substitute standard M79 Armor Piercing solid monobloc shot had no filler, windscreen, or penetrating cap.

The M88 H.C. B.I. Smoke Shell contained a filler of H.C. Based on a British design, it was intended to provide a slow-release "curtain" of smoke versus the exploding white phosphorus shell available to the 75-mm and other cannon originally designed for artillery spotting but which could also cause damaging burns.

The M26 brass cartridge case was used for all loaded rounds, with a weight of 5.28 lb (2.39 kg) and length of 21.3 in (54 cm). It was an entirely different case from the 3-inch MKIIM2 case used for the 3-inch M3 anti-aircraft gun and 3-inch M5, M6, and M7 guns used on the a towed anti-tank gun, M6 heavy tank, and M10 Gun Motor Carriage. The 76-mm chamber capacity varied by projectile (also given is the capacities for similar 3-inch rounds to illustrate the size differences):

76-mm M1 vs 3-inch M3/5/6/7, chamber capacities
Gun	M42 HE	M62 APC	M79 AP	M88 H.C. B.I.
76-mm M1	140.5 cu in (2,302 ml)	142.6 cu in (2,337 ml)	143.66 cu in (2,354.2 ml)	143.6 cu in (2,353 ml)
3-inch M3/5/6/7	203.5 cu in (3,335 ml)	205.585 cu in (3,368.93 ml)	203.5 cu in (3,335 ml)	None

The 3 inch cartridge was not completely filled by the propellants used; a distance wad was used to keep the propellant pressed against the primer end. By way of comparison, the 75 mm M3 gun had a chamber capacity of about 88 cu in (1,440 cc) for the M61 armor piercing projectile and about 80 cu in (1.3 L) for the M48 high explosive projectile and the British 17pdr 300 cu in (4.9 L).

== Vehicles mounting the 76 mm ==
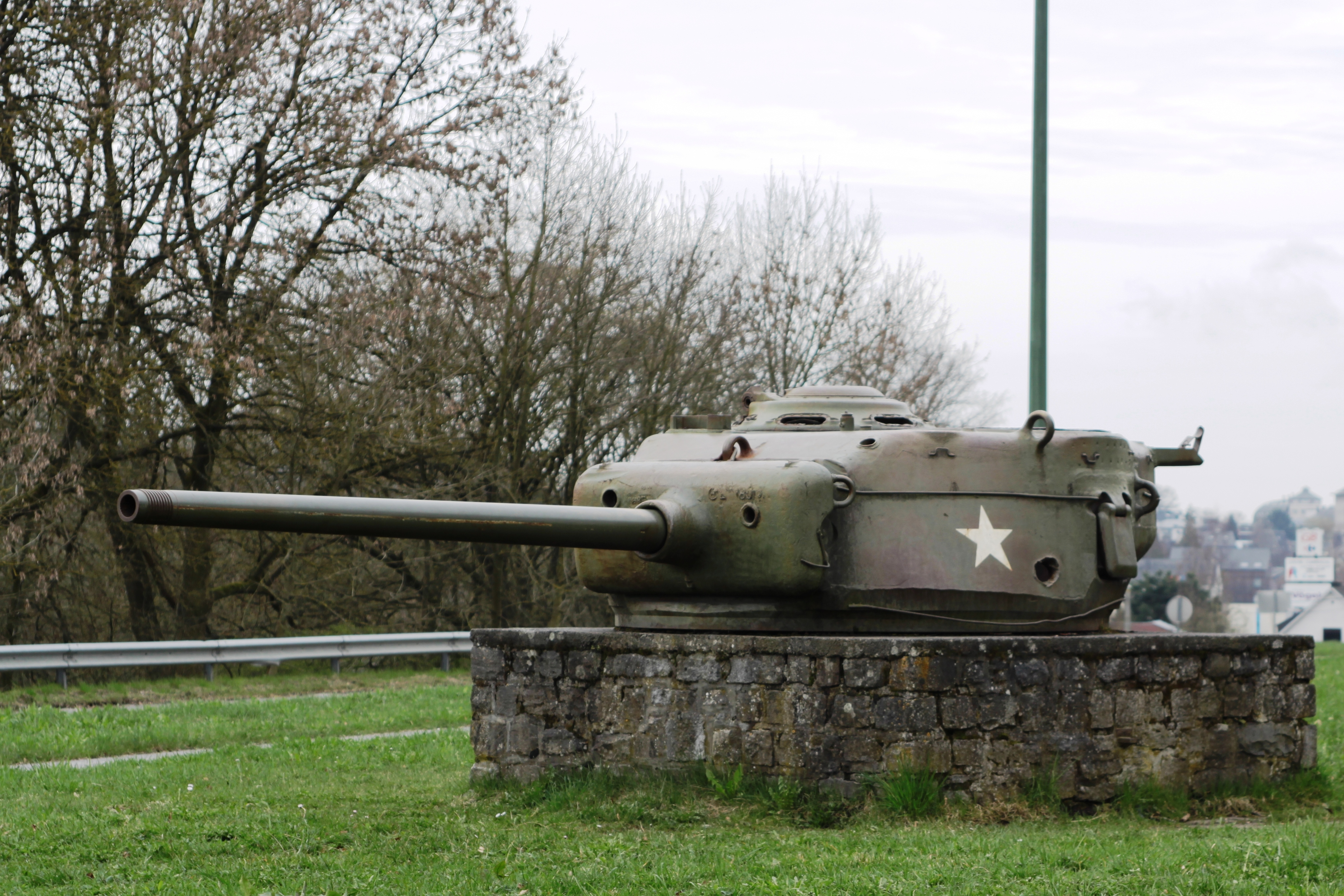
A T23 turret used on 76 mm gunned Shermans, here without the muzzle brake

With British Commonwealth designations in parentheses:

- 76 mm Gun Motor Carriage M18
- Medium Tank M4A1(76)W (Sherman IIA)
  - Medium Tank M4A1(76)W HVSS (Sherman IIAY)
- Medium Tank M4A2(76)W (Sherman IIIA)
  - Medium Tank M4A2(76)W HVSS (Sherman IIIAY)
- Medium Tank M4A3(76)W (Sherman IVA)
  - Medium Tank M4A3(76)W HVSS
- T23 medium tank
- T72 experimental Gun Motor Carriage

== Performance ==
Penetration of armor at 30 degrees from vertical
Ammunition	500 yards	1,000 yards	1,500 yards	2,000 yards
APC M62 Projectile (APCBC/HE-T)	93–94 mm	88–89 mm	81–82 mm	75–76 mm
AP M79 Shot (AP-T)	109 mm	92 mm	76 mm	64 mm
HVAP M93 (APCR-T)	157–158 mm	134–135 mm	116–117 mm	98–99 mm

Penetration of armor at 30 degrees from vertical
Ammunition	500 m	1,000 m
M62 APC-T	98 mm	90 mm
T4 HVAP	150 mm	132 mm

Calculated penetration at range (90 degrees) using American and British 50% success criteria
Ammunition type	Muzzle velocity	Penetration (mm)										
Ammunition type	Muzzle velocity	100 m	250 m	500 m	750 m	1000 m	1250 m	1500 m	1750 m	2000 m	2500 m	3000 m
M62 versus FHA	792 m/s (2,600 ft/s)	124	123	122	119	116	113	110	105	101	92	83
M62 versus RHA	792 m/s (2,600 ft/s)	125	121	116	111	106	101	97	93	89	81	74
M79 versus FHA	792 m/s (2,600 ft/s)	132	124	112	101	92	83	75	68	62	50	41
M79 versus RHA	792 m/s (2,600 ft/s)	154	145	131	119	107	97	88	79	72	59	48
M93	1,036 m/s (3,400 ft/s)	239	227	208	191	175	160	147	135	124	108	88

== Similar, alternative weapons ==
The 76 mm M1 was a project initiated by the Ordnance Department itself. Various entities suggested other weapon options which were not pursued.

- In October 1942, the Aberdeen-based Ballistics Research Laboratory suggested that research begin into two options: (1) arming the M4 medium tank with the 90 mm gun (if need be by altering the cartridge case and gun) and (2) designing a 3-inch gun firing a 15 lb (6.8 kg) shot at 915 m/s (3,000 ft/s).
- The Armored Board (the Armored Forces evaluation center at Fort Knox) suggested the production of 1,000 M4 medium tanks armed with 90-mm guns in the fall of 1943.
- The British expressed interest in mounting their 17-pounder on the M4 in August 1943, offering a monthly allotment of 200 weapons and ammunition, which could begin three months following acceptance. By the time that the US took this up in 1944, the British were too busy with their own conversions resulting in the Sherman Firefly. Some conversions destined for the US Army were performed in 1945 but did not see combat.

== See also ==
- List of U.S. Army weapons by supply catalog designation

=== Weapons of comparable role, performance and era ===
- British Ordnance QF 17 pounder
- German 7.5 cm KwK 40
- German 7.5 cm KwK 42
- Soviet 85 mm D-5T tank gun
- Soviet 100 mm D-10 tank gun
