= Ritsurin Station =

Railway station in Kagawa Prefecture, Japan

T25 Ritsurin Station 栗林駅
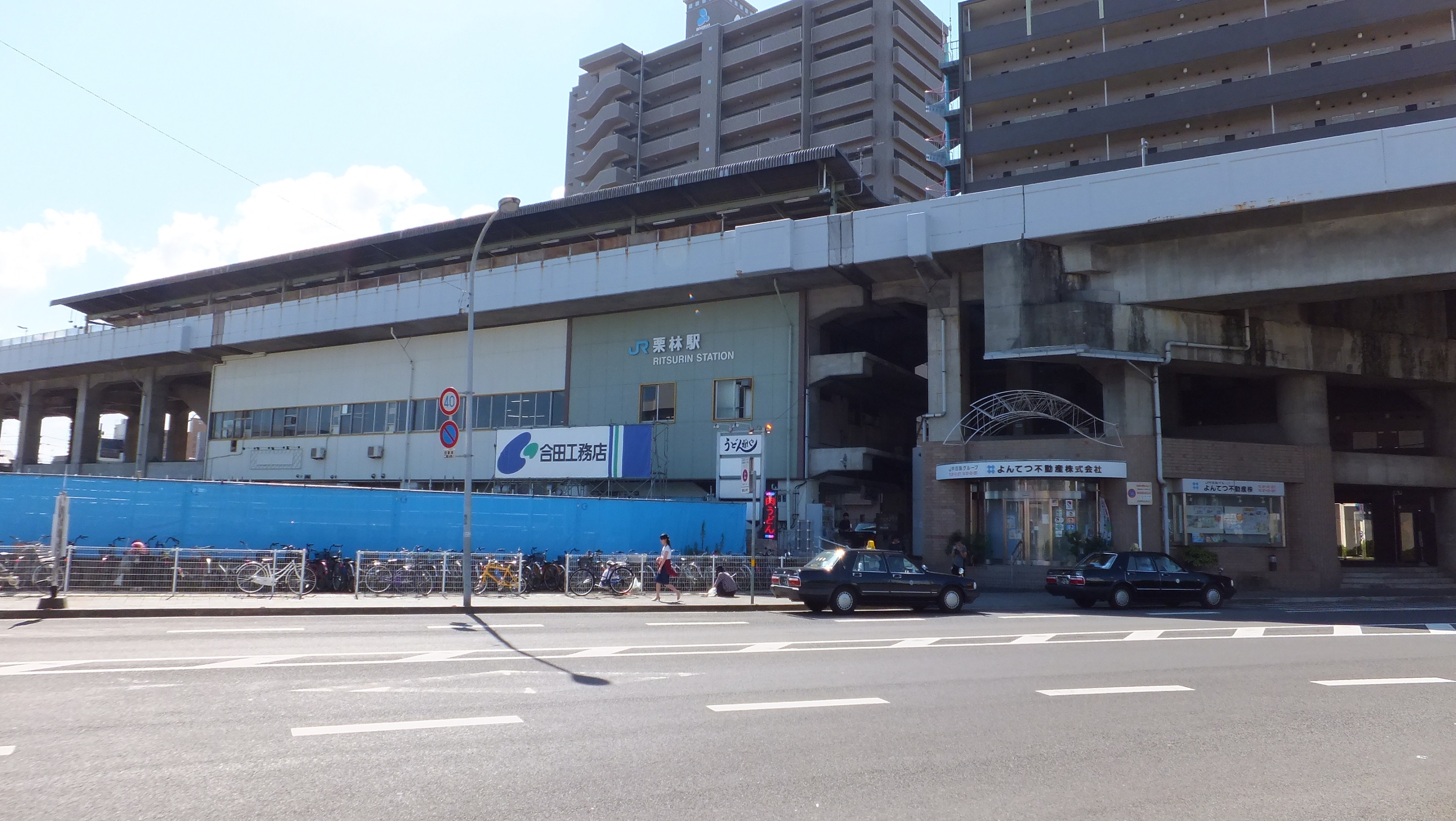
- Ritsurin Station in 2015

General information
- Location: 3-19 Fujitsukachō, Takamatsu City, Kagawa Prefecture 760-0071; Japan
- Coordinates: 34°19′56″N 134°03′13″E
- Operator: JR Shikoku
- Line: Kōtoku Line
- Distance: 4.3 km (2.7 mi) from Takamatsu
- Platforms: 1 island platform
- Tracks: 2

Construction
- Structure type: Elevated
- Parking: Available
- Cycle facilities: Designated parking area for bikes
- Accessible: No - escalator or stairs needed to reach platform

Other information
- Status: Staffed - JR ticket window (Midori no Madoguchi)
- Station code: T25
- Website: Official website

History
- Opened: 21 December 1925; 100 years ago

Passengers
- FY2019: 2378

Services
Preceding station	JR Shikoku	Following station
Ritsurin-Kōen-Kitaguchi T26 towards Takamatsu	Kōtoku Line	Kitachō T24 towards Tokushima
Limited Express
Takamatsu T28 towards Kojima	Uzushio	Yashima T23 towards Tokushima
Location
- Location within Kagawa Prefecture Location within Japan

Ritsurin Station (栗林駅, Ritsurin-eki) is a passenger railway station located in the city of Takamatsu, Kagawa Prefecture, Japan. It is operated by JR Shikoku and has the station number "T25".

== Lines ==
The station is served by the JR Shikoku Kōtoku Line and is located 4.3 km from the beginning of the line at Takamatsu. Besides local services, the Uzushio limited express between Okayama, Takamatsu and Tokushima also stops at the station.

== Layout ==
Ritsurin Station consists of an island platform serving two tracks. Track 1 is the through-track while track 2 is a passing loop. The station building is part of the elevated structure. Level 1 houses shops. The waiting room and a JR ticket window (with a Midori no Madoguchi facility) are located on level 2. Stairs and an escalator lead to the island platform on level 3. A large designated parking area for bikes is provided outside the station.

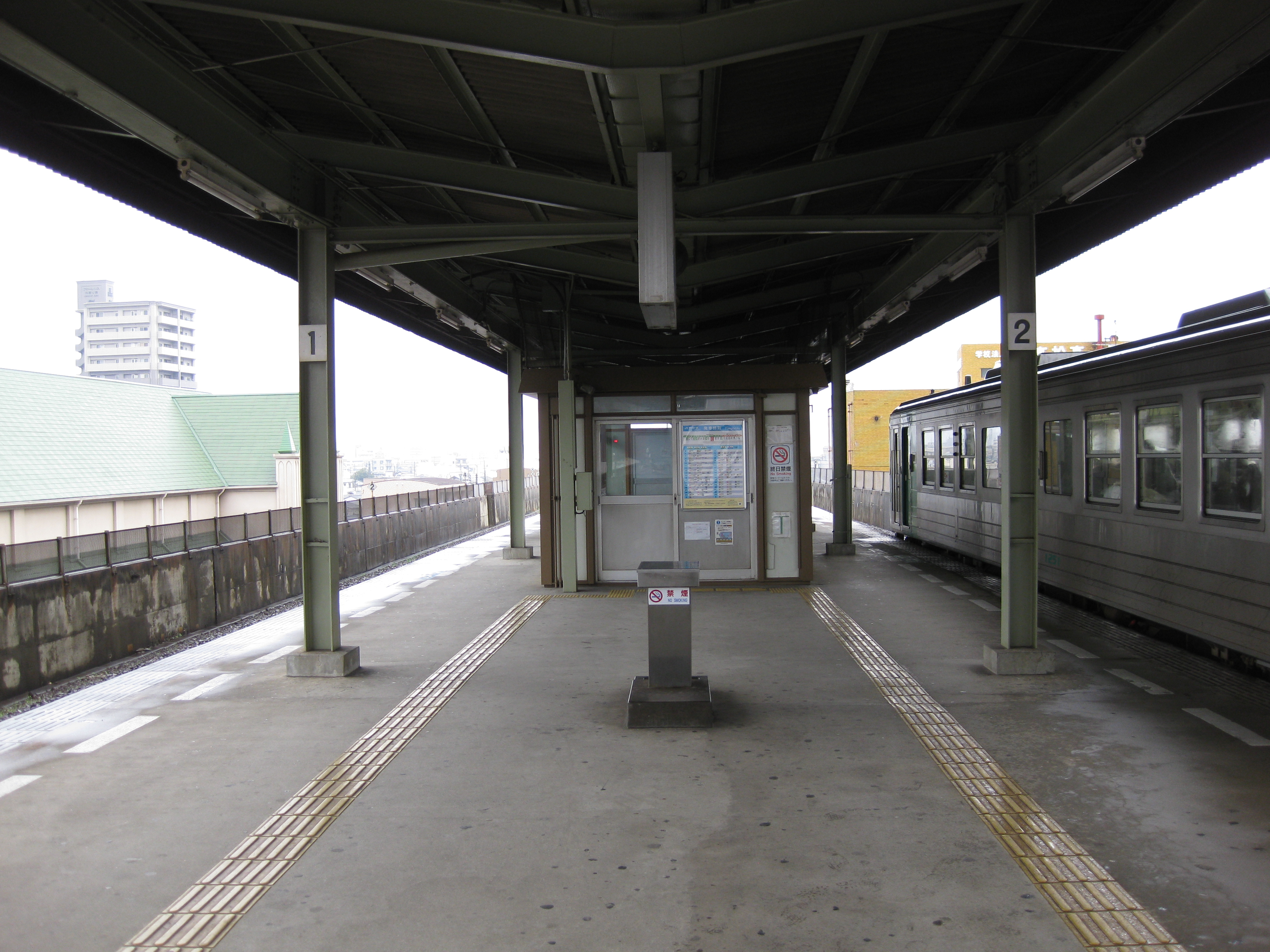
A view of the station platforms and tracks in 2010

== History ==
Ritsurin Station was opened on 21 December 1925 as an intermediate stop a few months after the track of the Kōtoku Line had been extended eastwards from Takamatsu to Shido. At that time the station was operated by Japanese Government Railways, later becoming Japanese National Railways (JNR). With the privatization of JNR on 1 April 1987, control of the station passed to JR Shikoku.

== Surrounding area ==
- Takamatsu First High School
- Takamatsu Municipal Sakuramachi Junior High School

== See also ==
- List of railway stations in Japan
