= T21 =

T21 may refer to:

== Aircraft ==
- Junkers T.21, a German reconnaissance aircraft produced in the Soviet Union
- Slingsby T.21, a British training glider

== Rail and transit ==
- Minami-morimachi Station, in Kita-ku, Osaka, Japan
- Myōden Station, in Ichikawa, Chiba, Japan
- SJ T21, a Swedish locomotive
- Yakuriguchi Station, in Takamatsu, Kagawa Prefecture, Japan

== Ships and boats ==
- ARV Amazonas (T-21), a tank landing ship of the Venezuelan Navy
- German torpedo boat T21
- Mistral T-21, a Canadian sailboat

== Other uses ==
- T21 (rocket), an American chemical warfare rocket
- Down syndrome, or trisomy 21
- Estonian national road 21
- T21 road (Tanzania)
- T21 Light Tank, an American light tank
- Terminal 21 – Chain of mixed-use complexes
- ThinkPad T21, a notebook computer
- Trisomie 21, a French cold wave group
