= Tsuda Kofun Cluster =

Kofun period burial mound in Sanuki, Kagawa, Japan

Tsuda Kofun cluster
- 津田古墳群 (Japanese)
- Tsuda Kofun cluster Tsuda Kofun Cluster (Japan)
- Interactive map of Tsuda Kofun cluster
- 34°18′02″N 134°14′15″E
- Type: Kofun
- Periods: Kofun period
- Location: Sanuki, Kagawa, Japan
- Region: Shikoku

History
- Built: 5th century AD

Site notes
- Public access: Yes

The Tsuda Kofun cluster (津田古墳群) is a group of Kofun period burial mounds located in the city of Sanuki, Kagawa Prefecture, on the island of Shikoku of Japan. The tumulus group was designated a National Historic Site in 2013, with the area under protection expanded in 2014.

== Overview ==
The National Historic Site consist of nine burial mounds that were built from the early Kofun period to the early middle Kofun period in an area of 4.5 kilometers east–west and 3.5 kilometers north–south centered on the coastal area of Tsuda Bay overlooking the Seto Inland Sea. This group of burial mounds was known in the Edo period, and there are records of archaeological excavations from the early twentieth century onwards. The earliest mounds are made from piled stones in a style unique to eastern Shikoku and are orientated to the east; however, later tumuli contain cylindrical haniwa and are orientated in a north–south direction. This indicates increasing political and cultural influences from the Kinai region. The split bamboo-shaped sarcophagi at the Tsuda Kofun cluster was made from volcanic stone produced in this area, and the same volcanic stone sarcophagus have been found in the Kinai, Kibi, and Awa regions, which suggests a strong maritime connection. In the middle of the Kofun period, when the Tomita Chausuyama Kofun, the largest keyhole-shaped burial mound in Shikoku, appeared inland, the construction of burial mounds in the Tsuda site stopped. This clearly shows that a major political consolidation that occurred in the region during that period.

List of Kofun in the Tsuda Kofun Cluster
Name	Type	Length	Comments
Unobeyama Kofun (うのべ山古墳)	zenpō-kōen-fun (前方後円墳)	37m	The anterior part spreads into a plectrum shape. The mound structure is a stone mound characteristic of eastern Shikoku. Although the burial facilities have not been investigated, judging from the age of the earthenware excavated from the mound, it is believed to have been built in the latter half of the 3rd century, making it one of the oldest burial mounds in Kagawa Prefecture.
Kawahigashi Kofun (川東古墳)	zenpō-kōen-fun (前方後円墳)	37m	The tumulus is built with piled stones, with two burial pits on the top of the mound, but details are unknown. From a small piece of jar-shaped haniwa, it is estimated that it was built in the first half of the 4th century.
Koeda Kofun (古枝古墳)	zenpō-kōen-fun (前方後円墳)	34m	The anterior part opens in a plectrum shape. An excavation was conducted in 1962, finding one pit-style stone burial chamber and one wooden coffin orientated east–west. Grave goods include a Chinese bronze mirror and beads from the burial chamber, and a bronze mirror, beads, and iron arrowhead from the wooden coffin.
Sekiyama Kofun (赤山古墳)	zenpō-kōen-fun (前方後円墳)	45～51m	Currently, only the round part of the tumulus remains, but it was originally a 50-meter keyhole-shaped tumulus. Two split bamboo-shaped sarcophagi are exposed on the top of the mound, one facing east–west and the other facing north–south.The existence of a pit-style stone burial chamber is mentioned in documents, and bronze mirrors and bracelet-shaped stone products are said to have been excavated. Based on the dates of the cylindrical haniwa and other excavated items, it was built in the first half of the 4th century
Hitotsuyama Kofun (一つ山古墳)	enpun (円墳)	25～27m	An elliptical tumulus measuring 27 meters north–south by 25 meters east–west, a split bamboo-shaped sarcophagus was buried in the north–south direction. Judging from the age of the pot-shaped haniwa excavated from the mound, it is believed to have been constructed in the middle of the 4th century
Iwasakiyama No.4 Kofun (岩崎山4号墳)	zenpō-kōen-fun (前方後円墳)	61.8m	The largest tumulus in the cluster, it was excavated in 1951, during which time a pit-style stone burial chamber orientated north–south was confirmed at the top of the mound, and a split bamboo-shaped sarcophagus was found inside. Bronze mirrors, shell rings, bracelet-shaped stone products, iron swords, copper and iron arrowheads, iron agricultural tools, were found as burial goods. In addition to cylindrical haniwa, house-shaped haniwa have been excavated from the mound. Based on these items, it is believed to have been built in the middle of the 4th century
Ryuozan Kofun (龍王山古墳)	enpun (円墳)	25m	A pit-style stone burial chamber with a total length of 5.9 meters is exposed on the top of the mound in the north–south direction, and there are records that a bronze mirror, an iron mirror, and an iron sword were excavated in the Taisho era. A pot-shaped haniwa and a cylindrical haniwa were excavated from the mound, and it is believed to have been built in the latter half of the 4th century.
Keboyama Kofun (けぼ山古墳)	zenpō-kōen-fun (前方後円墳)	61.8m	Fragments of the lid of a split bamboo-shaped sarcophagus were fund on the top of the posterior round part, and there are records that human bones, bronze mirrors, iron swords, and beads were unearthed in the Taisho era, but details of the burial chamber itself is not clear. A jar-shaped haniwa was unearthed from the mound, and judging from its age, the tumulus is presumed to have been built in the latter half of the 4th century
Iwasakiyama No.1 Kofun (岩崎山1号墳)	enpun (円墳)	18～19m	Two box-type sarcophagi are placed side by side on the top of the mound in the north–south direction. These were excavated in 1927, and in addition to human bones, iron swords, and iron agricultural tools were unearthed. Cylindrical haniwa and morning glory-shaped haniwa have been unearthed from the mound, and based on these, it is presumed the tumulus was built at the end of the 4th century

== See also ==
- List of Historic Sites of Japan (Kagawa)
