= Kikaku Prefectural Park =

Park in Sanuki, Japan

Coordinates: 34.252906°N 134.183367°E

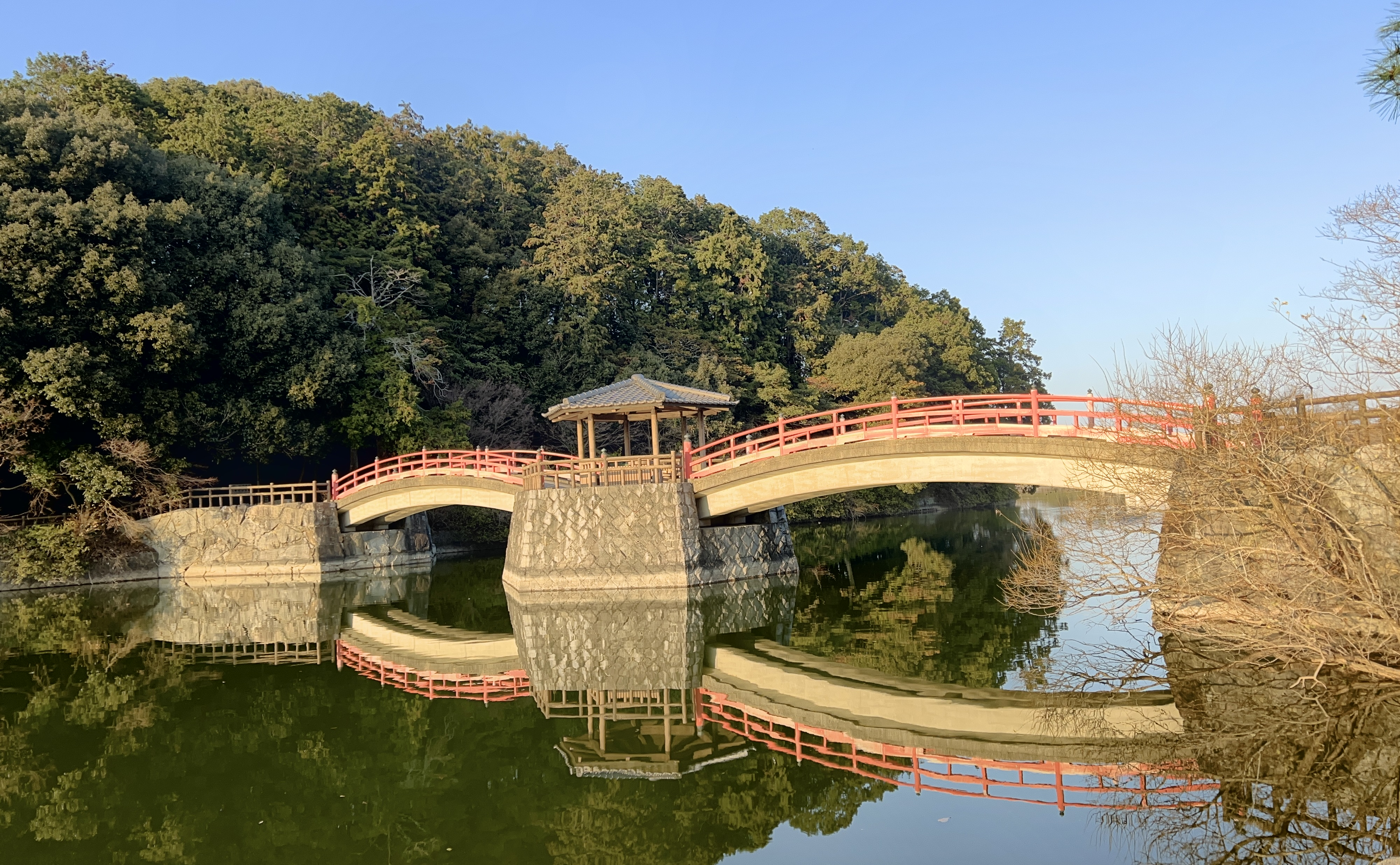
Kame-jima and Sakura-bashi in Kagawa prefectural Kikaku park.

Kikaku Prefectural Park (香川県立亀鶴公園, Kagawa kenritsu Kikaku Kōen) is a park located in Nagao-Myō, Sanuki, Kagawa Prefecture in Japan. It was designated as a prefectural park on June 1, 1949. The park is known for its flowers, particularly cherries and irises.

== Summary ==
Kikaku park is also known as a place of scenic beauty Tousan area (東讃地域, Tōsan Tīki)(eastern part of Kagawa). Is a park area covering 18.98ha (16.63ha city land, 2.35ha land shrine) in centered on the "Miya-ike" and "Usa Shrine (宇佐神社, Usa Jinja)". To the west of the park is visible in figure flying crane Tsuru ga mountain (鶴ガ山, Tsuru-ga-yama), from the fact that "Kame island (亀島, Kame-jima)" float is seen in the pond turtle, named "Kikaku Park (亀鶴公園, Kikaku Kōen)". Also extends to an area of about 33ha, including the hills and around the park. Include "Kame-Jima" rich natural forests may be other, more than of 300 species were identified, Iris Flower Field, cherry trees in the grounds. It is one of the cherry blossoms in the region east of praise, Sakura(Somei-Yoshino) has been planted on both sides about 300 Tong crest connecting the Usa shrine Kameshima side and especially over the 300m 20m in width and length. This area has become crowded with many blossom viewers, and the core. Bridge "Sakura" are lit up or tie side Kame-jima the "Comprehensive Park Nagao", the season of flowers fountain is running especially.

== Geography ==
=== Position ===
- 1673-1, Nagao-Myō, Sanuki, Kagawa, 769-2303 Japan.

Park administrators : Sanuki-City, and Kagawa Prefecture.

=== Transportation ===
- About 5 minutes by car from Nagao Station(Takamatsu-Kotohira Electric Railroad Nagao Line).
- About 10 minutes by car from Zōda Station(Shikoku Railway Company Kōtoku Line .
- About 15 minutes to about 10 km south by car from Takamatsu Expressway 13 Shido Interchange.
- Just off "Kikaku Kōen" bus stop by Sanuki-City Community bus Shido-Tawa Line(Green route).

=== Parking ===
- 250 cars can be parked free of charge.

North park, central park (front of the Usa-Jinja), south side of the park is available. Moreover, it is also available parking Nagao comprehensive park. Southwest side parking park is closed when the event takes place.
