= Zōda Station =

Railway station in Sanuki, Kagawa prefecture, Japan

T17 Zōda Station 造田駅
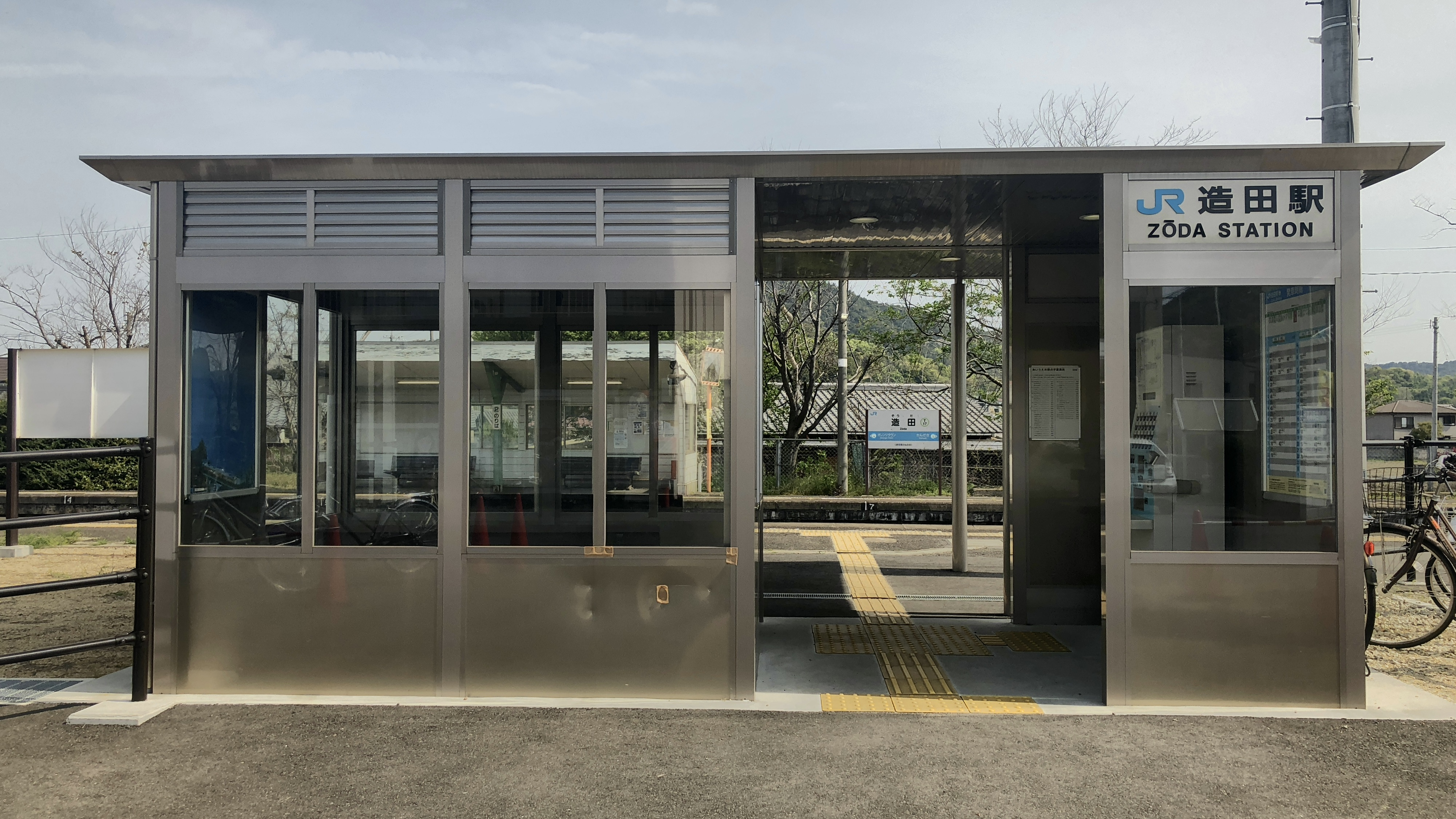
- Zōda Station in April 2018

General information
- Location: 698 Zōtanomada, Sanuki City, Kagawa Prefecture 769-2313; Japan
- Owner: 34°16′58.1″N 134°11′9.4″E
- Operator: JR Shikoku
- Line: Kōtoku Line
- Distance: 21.3 km (13.2 mi) from Takamatsu
- Platforms: 2 side platforms
- Tracks: 2

Other information
- Status: Unstaffed (since 2010)
- Station code: T17

History
- Opened: 21 March 1926; 100 years ago
- Rebuilt: 2017

Passengers
- FY2019: 480

Services
| Preceding station | JR Shikoku | Following station |
|---|---|---|
| Orange Town T18 towards Takamatsu | Kōtoku Line | Kanzaki T16 towards Tokushima |
Uzushio does not stop here
Location
- Location within Kagawa Prefecture Location within Japan

Zōda Station (造田駅, Zōda-eki) is a passenger railway station located in the city of Sanuki, Kagawa Prefecture, Japan, operated by Shikoku Railway Company (JR Shikoku). It is numbered "T17".

== Lines ==
Zōda Station is served by the Kōtoku Line, and lies 21.3 km from the starting point of the line at Takamatsu Station.

== Station layout ==
The station consists of two side platforms serving two tracks. The platforms are linked by a footbridge.

=== Platforms ===
| 1 | Kōtoku Line | for Shido and Takamatsu |
| 2 | Kōtoku Line | for Sambommatsu, Hiketa, and Tokushima |

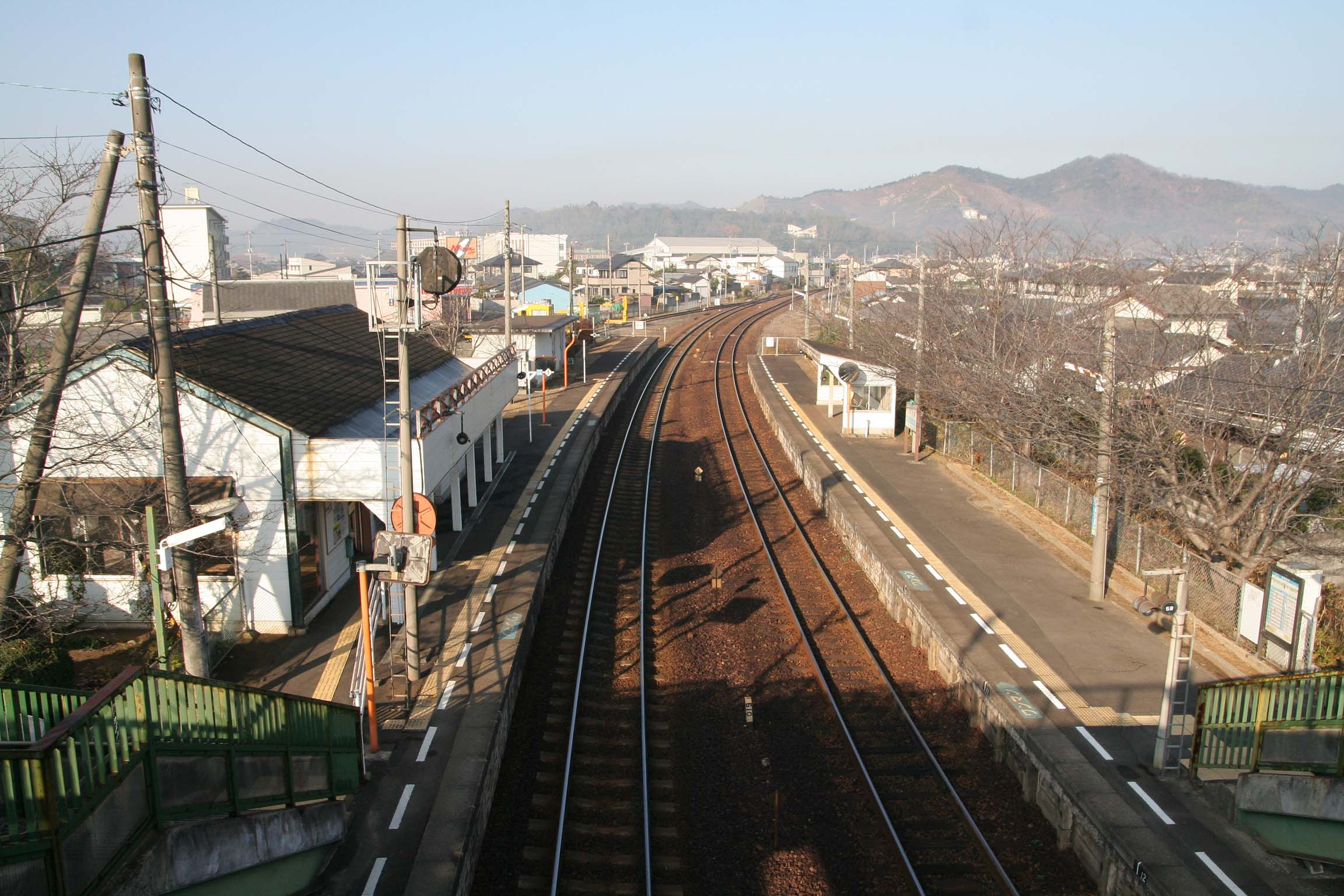
The platforms and tracks in December 2007

== History ==
Zōda Station opened on 21 March 1926. With the privatization of Japanese National Railways (JNR) on 1 April 1987, the station came under the control of JR Shikoku.

The station became unstaffed from 1 September 2010.

A new station building was built adjoining the original structure, opening for use on 10 February 2017.

== Surrounding area ==
- Zōda Elementary School

== See also ==
- List of railway stations in Japan
