= Sanuki-Mure Station =

Railway station in Takamatsu, Kagawa prefecture, Japan

T20 Sanuki-Mure Station 讃岐牟礼駅
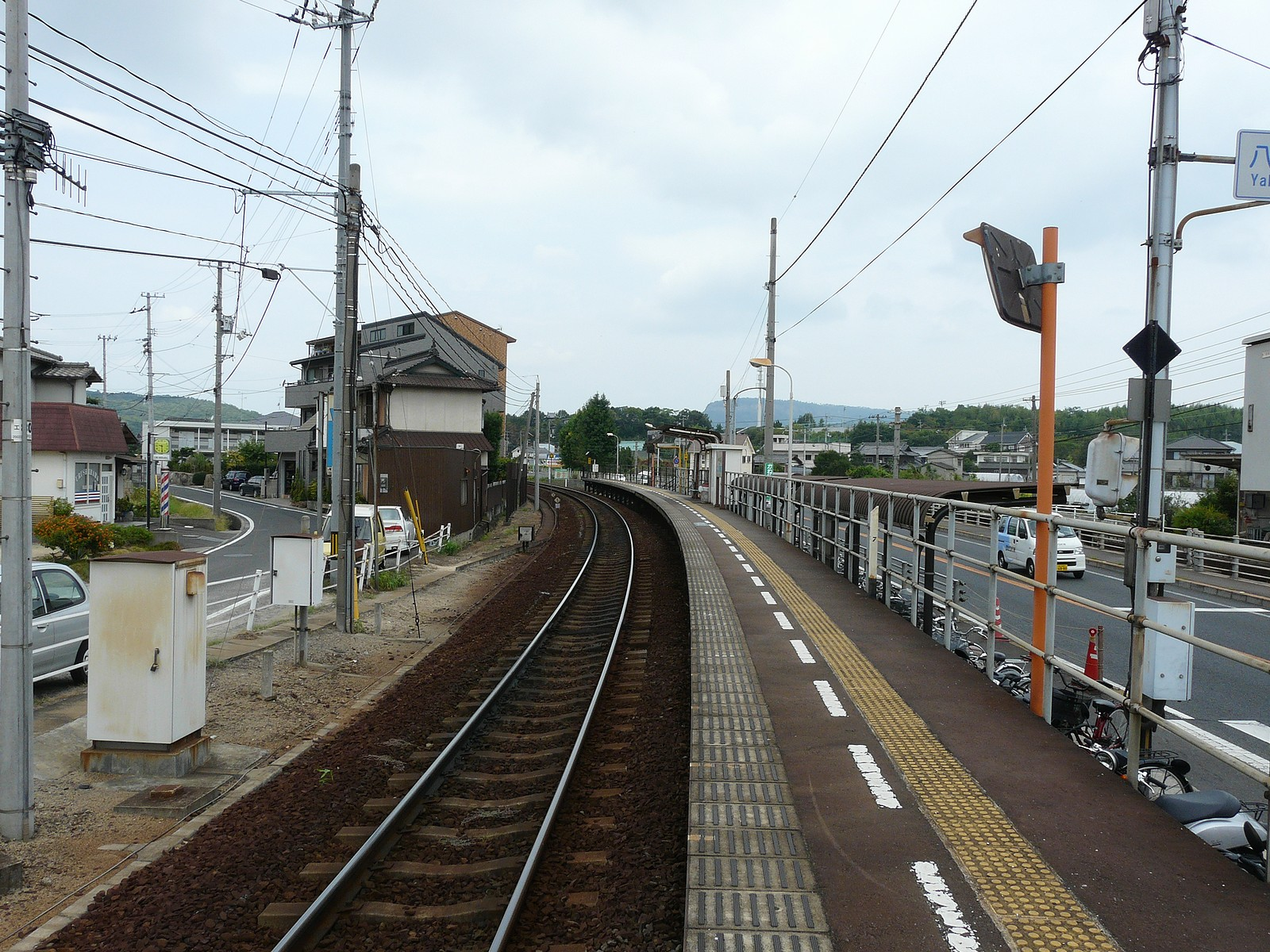
- Sanuki-Mure Station, July 2007

General information
- Location: 1392-3 Abuta, Omachi, Murecho, Takamatsu City, Kagawa Prefecture 761-0122; Japan
- Coordinates: 34°20′12″N 134°08′50″E
- Operator: JR Shikoku
- Line: Kōtoku Line
- Distance: 13.4 km (8.3 mi) from Takamatsu
- Platforms: 1 side platform
- Tracks: 1
- Connections: Kotoden Shido Line (via Yakuri-Shinmichi)

Construction
- Structure type: At grade
- Cycle facilities: Bike shed
- Accessible: Yes - ramp leads up to platforms

Other information
- Status: Unstaffed
- Station code: T20

History
- Opened: 1 November 1986; 39 years ago

Passengers
- FY2019: 514

Services
Preceding station	JR Shikoku	Following station
Yakuriguchi T21 towards Takamatsu	Kōtoku Line	Shido T19 towards Tokushima
Uzushio does not stop here
Location
- Location within Kagawa Prefecture Location within Japan

Sanuki-Mure Station (讃岐牟礼駅, Sanuki-Mure-eki) is a passenger railway station located in the city of Takamatsu, Kagawa Prefecture, Japan. It is operated by JR Shikoku and has the station number T20.

== Lines ==
The station is served by the JR Shikoku Kōtoku Line and is located 13.4 km from the beginning of the line at Takamatsu. Only local services stop at the station.

== Layout ==
Sanuki-Mure Station consists of a side platform serving a single track. There is no station building, only a weather shelter on the platform for waiting passengers and a "Tickets Corner" (a small shelter housing an automatic ticket vending machine). A ramp leads up to the platform from the access road. A bike shed is provided at the station entrance.

== History ==
Japanese National Railways (JNR) opened Sanuki-Mure Station on 1 November 1986 a temporary stop on the existing Kōtoku Line. With the privatization of JNR on 1 April 1987, JR Shikoku assumed control and the stop was upgraded to a full station.

== Surrounding area ==
- Yakuri-Shinmichi Station, operated by Kotoden
- Kagawa Prefectural Takamatsu Kita Junior and Senior High School
- Japan National Route 11

== See also ==
- List of railway stations in Japan
