= Nagao, Kagawa =

Dissolved municipality in Kagawa prefecture, Japan

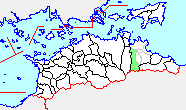
Nagao in Kagawa Prefecture

Nagao (長尾町, Nagao-chō) was a town located in Ōkawa District, Kagawa Prefecture, Japan.

On April 1, 2002, Nagao, along with the towns of Ōkawa, Sangawa, Shido and Tsuda (all from Ōkawa District), was merged to create the city of Sanuki.

== History ==
- September 16, 1956 - Zouta (造田, Zouta-mura) merges Nagao-chō(the 2nd), and Nagao (長尾町, Nagao-chō) (the 3rd) starts.
- November 1, 1959 - The part of Ido, Miki, Kagawa, Kita District is admitted.

== Area composition ==
Nagao (長尾町, Nagao-chō) consisted of 4 hamlets.

- Zouta (造田) Hamlet (plains)
- Nagao (長尾) Hamlet (plains)
- Maeyama (前山) Hamlet (Mountainous region)
- Tawa (多和) Hamlet (Mountainous region)

== Traffic ==
Roadside Station

- Roadside Station Nagao (道の駅ながお, Michi no eki Nagao)

== Famous building ==
- Nagao temple (長尾寺, Nagao-ji)
- Ōkubo temple (大窪寺, Ōkubo-ji)
