= Sangawa, Kagawa =

Dissolved municipality in Kagawa prefecture, Japan

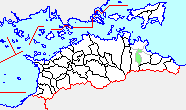
Sangawa in Kagawa Prefecture

Sangawa (寒川町, Sangawa-chō) was a town in Ōkawa District, Kagawa Prefecture, Japan.

On April 1, 2002, Sangawa, along with the towns of Ōkawa, Nagao, Shido and Tsuda (all from Ōkawa District), was merged to create the city of Sanuki.
