= Tsuruwa Station =

Passenger railway station in Sanuki, Kagawa Prefecture, Japan

T14 Tsuruwa Station 鶴羽駅
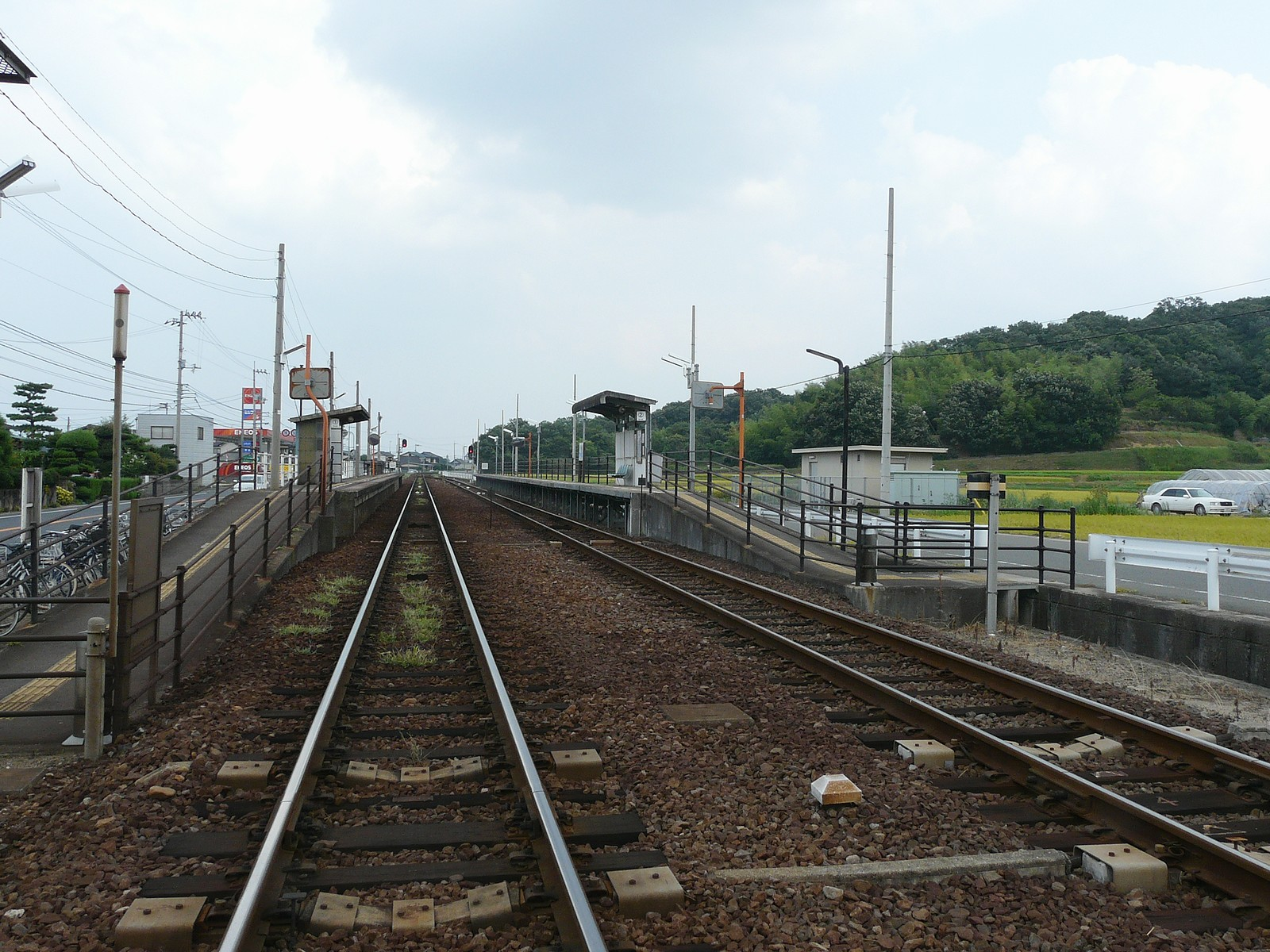
- Tsuruwa Station, July 2007

General information
- Location: Tsudamachi Tsuruwa, Sanuki City, Kagawa Prefecture 769-2402; Japan
- Coordinates: 34°16′49″N 134°16′27″E
- Operator: JR Shikoku
- Line: Kōtoku Line
- Distance: 30.4 km (18.9 mi) from Takamatsu
- Platforms: 2 side platforms
- Tracks: 2

Construction
- Structure type: At grade
- Cycle facilities: bike shed
- Accessible: Yes - ramps lead up to platforms

Other information
- Status: Unstaffed
- Station code: T14

History
- Opened: 1 October 1961; 64 years ago

Passengers
- FY2019: 158

Services
Preceding station	JR Shikoku	Following station
Sanuki-Tsuda T15 towards Takamatsu	Kōtoku Line	Nibu T13 towards Tokushima
Uzushio does not stop here
Location
- Location within Kagawa Prefecture Location within Japan

Tsuruwa Station (鶴羽駅, Tsuruwa-eki) is a passenger railway station located in the city of Sanuki, Kagawa Prefecture, Japan. It is operated by JR Shikoku and has the station number "T14".

== Lines ==
The station is served by the JR Shikoku Kōtoku Line and is located 30.4 km from the beginning of the line at Takamatsu. Only local services stop at the station.

== Layout ==
Tsuruwa Station consists of two opposed side platforms serving two tracks. There is no station building, but each platform has a weather shelter for waiting passengers. There is no direct link between the platforms. A road level crossing at one end of the platforms is used to cross the tracks. On either side of the level crossing, separate ramps lead up to each platform. A bike shed is provided next to the tracks.

== History ==
Japanese National Railways (JNR) opened Tsuruwa Station on 1 October 1961 as an added stop on the existing Kōtoku Line. With the privatization of JNR on 1 April 1987, JR Shikoku assumed control and the stop was upgraded to a full station.

== Surrounding area ==
- Japan Dolphin Center
- Former Sanuki Municipal Tsuruha Elementary School

== See also ==
- List of railway stations in Japan
