= Tsuda, Kagawa =

Community and former town in Kagawa Prefecture, Japan

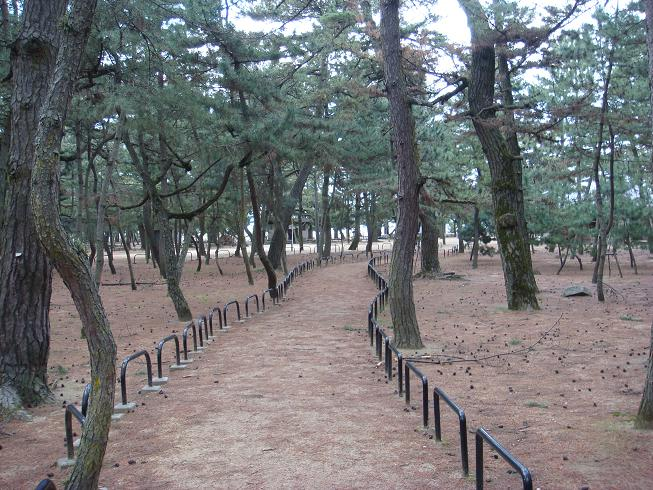
Tsuda Pine Groves (Tsuda no matsubara)

Tsuda (津田, Tsuda) is a community and former town, currently part of Sanuki City, Kagawa Prefecture, Japan. It lies in the eastern part of the prefecture facing the Seto Inland Sea.

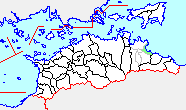
Tsuda (in green) in Kagawa Prefecture

Tsuda was designated a village in 1890, upgraded to a town in 1898, and merged with Tsuruwa to the east in 1956. In 2002, the town of Tsuda (津田町, Tsuda-chō) was dissolved, and merged with the surrounding towns of Ōkawa, Nagao, Sangawa and Shido (all from Ōkawa District) to create the new city of Sanuki.
