= Shido, Kagawa =

Dissolved municipality in Kagawa prefecture, Japan

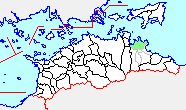
Location of Shido (in green) in Kagawa Prefecture

Shido (志度, Shido) is a community and former town, currently part of Sanuki City, Kagawa Prefecture, Japan. Shido is in the eastern part of the prefecture facing Sanuki Bay, an inlet of the Seto Inland Sea, to the north.

Shido is known for Shido-ji Temple, the 86th temple of the Shikoku Pilgrimage. It is also the birthplace of Hiraga Gennai, a prolific 18th-century inventor.

Shido was designated a village in the late 19th century and merged with Sue to the south in 1890. The village was upgraded to a town in 1898, and incorporated the villages of Kamoshō and Oda in 1956. In 2002, town of Shido (志度町, Shido-chō) was dissolved and merged with the towns of Ōkawa, Nagao, Sangawa and Tsuda (all from Ōkawa District) to create the new city of Sanuki.

Sanuki City Hall is located in Shido. The town is the terminus for the Kotoden Shido Line, which opened in 1911 and runs from the city of Takamatsu. It is also serviced by the JR Kōtoku Line.

== Gallery ==
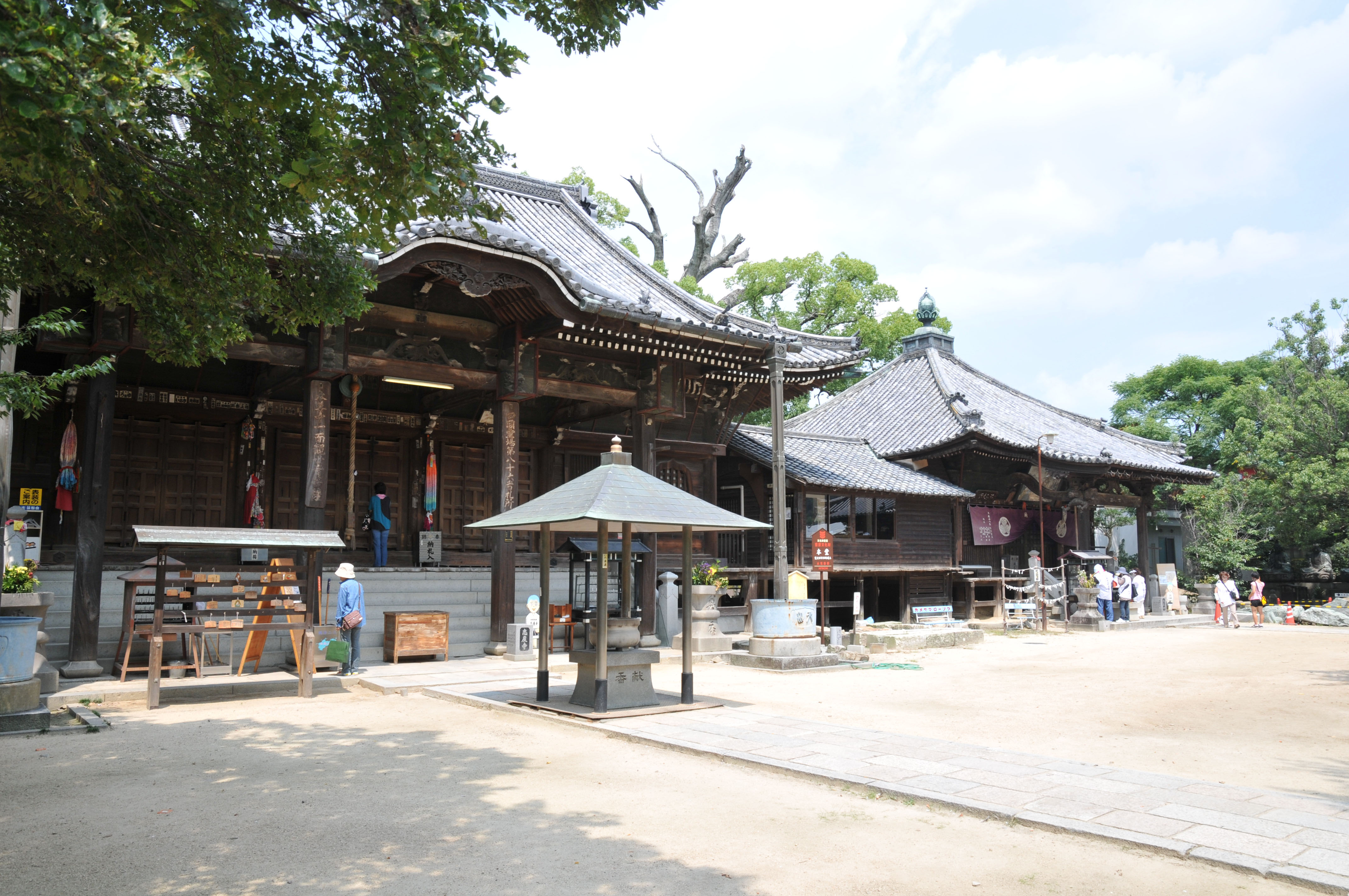
Shido-ji Temple

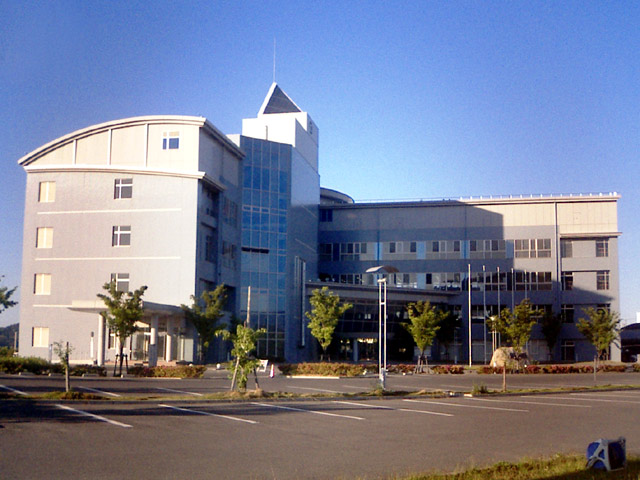
Sanuki City Hall

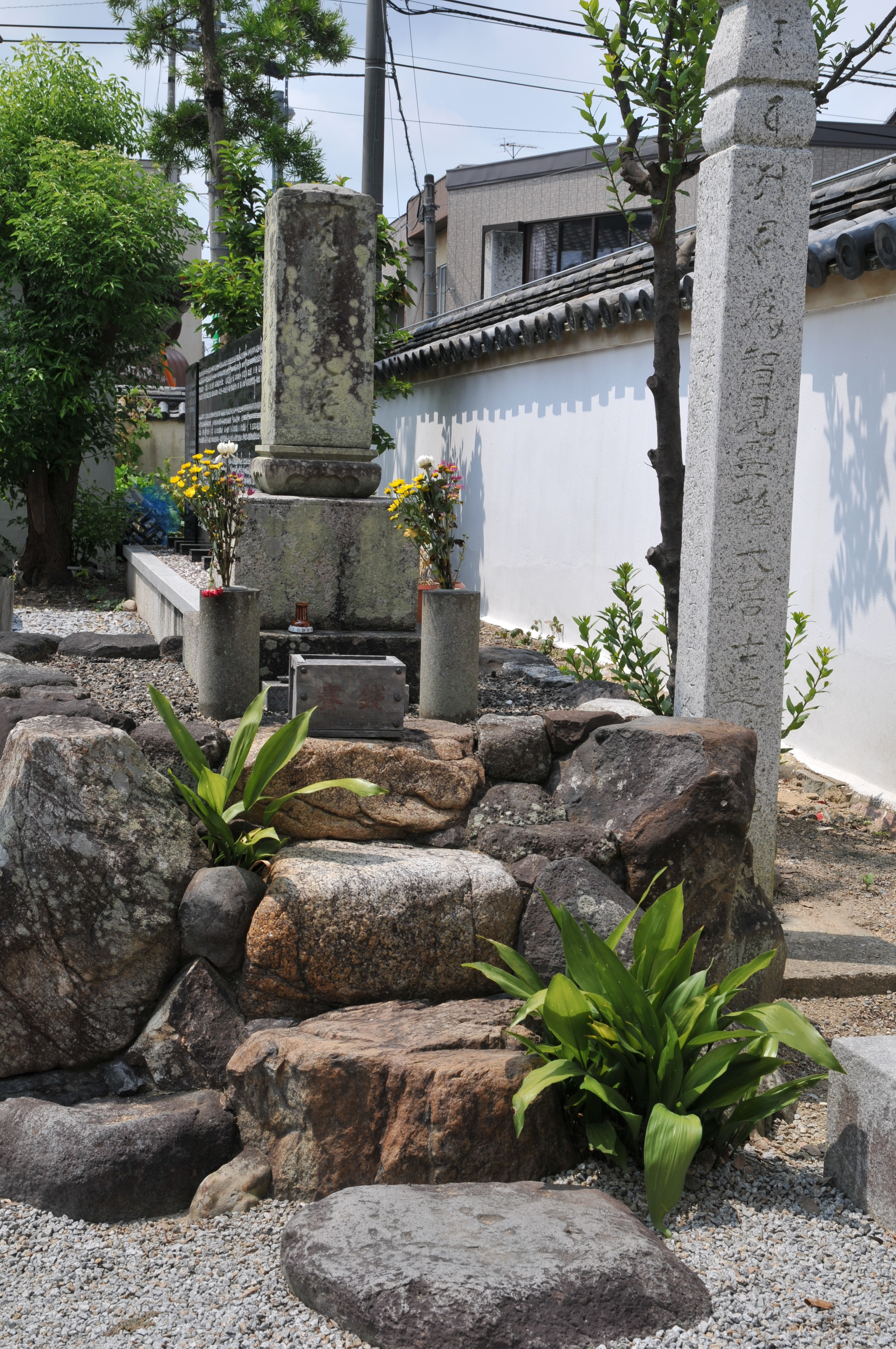
Grave of Hiraga Gennai
