= Ōkawa District, Kagawa =

Former district in Kagawa prefecture, Japan

Coordinates: 34.197°N 134.239°E

Ōkawa (大川郡, Ōkawa-gun) was a former district in Kagawa Prefecture, Japan. It included several towns in the eastern part of the prefecture.

The district and its towns were dissolved in the early 2000s, and are now covered by two cities:

- Sanuki - formed from western part on April 1, 2002, by merging the towns of Ōkawa, Nagao, Sangawa, Shido and Tsuda.
- Higashikagawa - formed from eastern part on April 1, 2003, by merging the towns of Hiketa, Ōchi and Shirotori.
