= Sanuki, Kagawa =

Sanuki さぬき市
- City
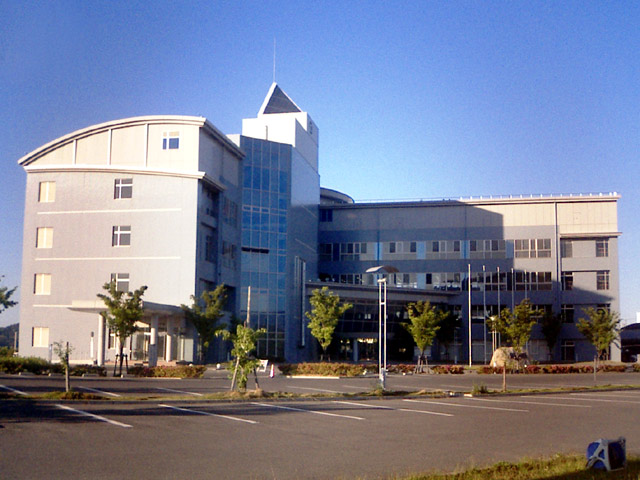
- Sanuki City Hall

- Flag Seal
- Location of Sanuki in Kagawa Prefecture

- Location in Japan
- Coordinates: 34°19′12″N 134°10′46″E
- Country: Japan
- Region: Shikoku
- Prefecture: Kagawa

Government
  - Mayor: Shigeki Oyama (since May 2006)

Area
  - Total: 158.63 km^{2} (61.25 sq mi)

Population (September 1, 2022)
  - Total: 46,016
  - Density: 290.08/km^{2} (751.31/sq mi)
- Time zone: UTC+09:00 (JST)
- City hall address: Shido 5385-8, Sanuki-shi, Kagawa-ken 769-2195
- Website: Official website
- Symbols
- Flower: Cosmos
- Tree: Pinus

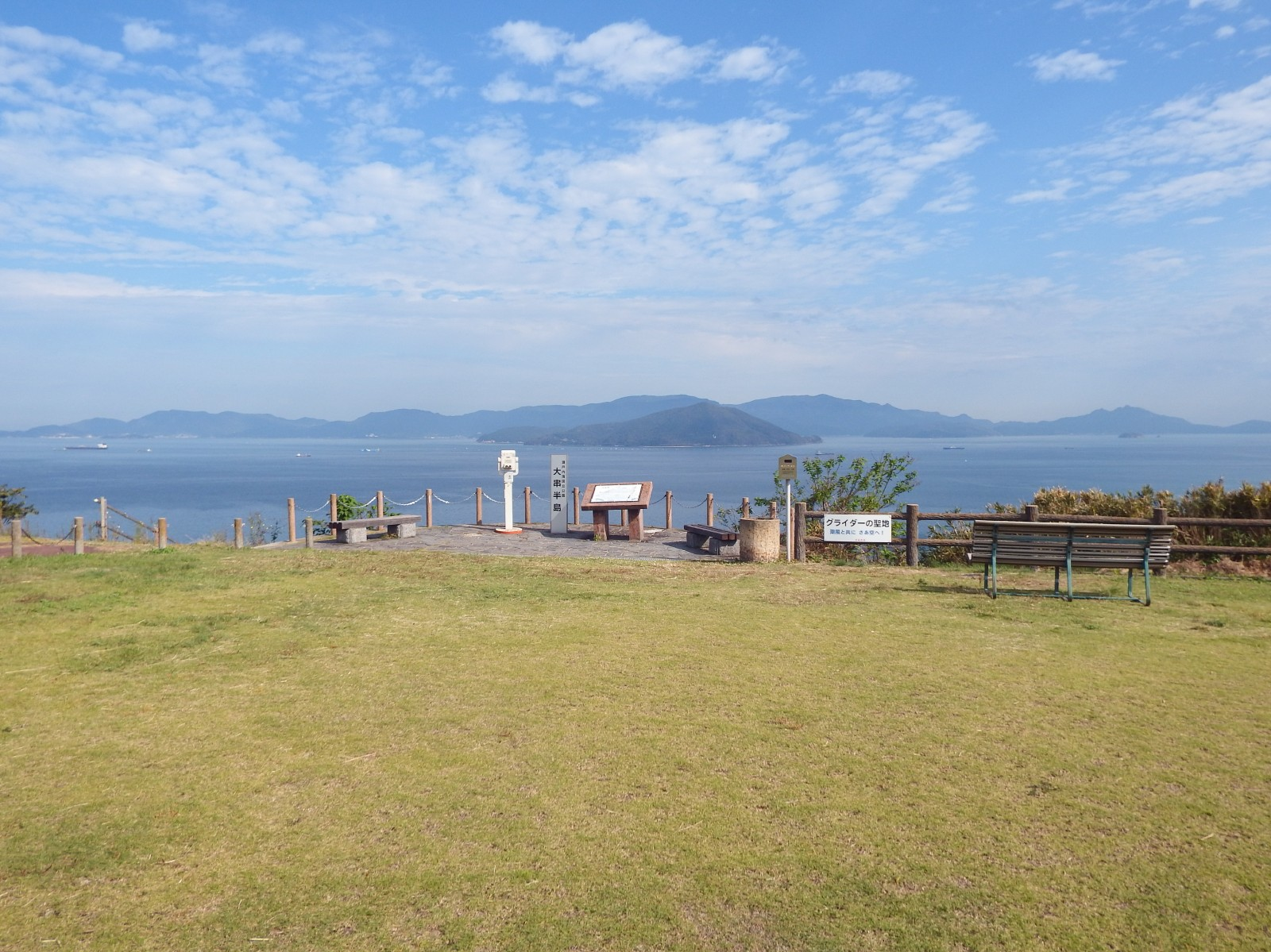
Ogushi Nature Park

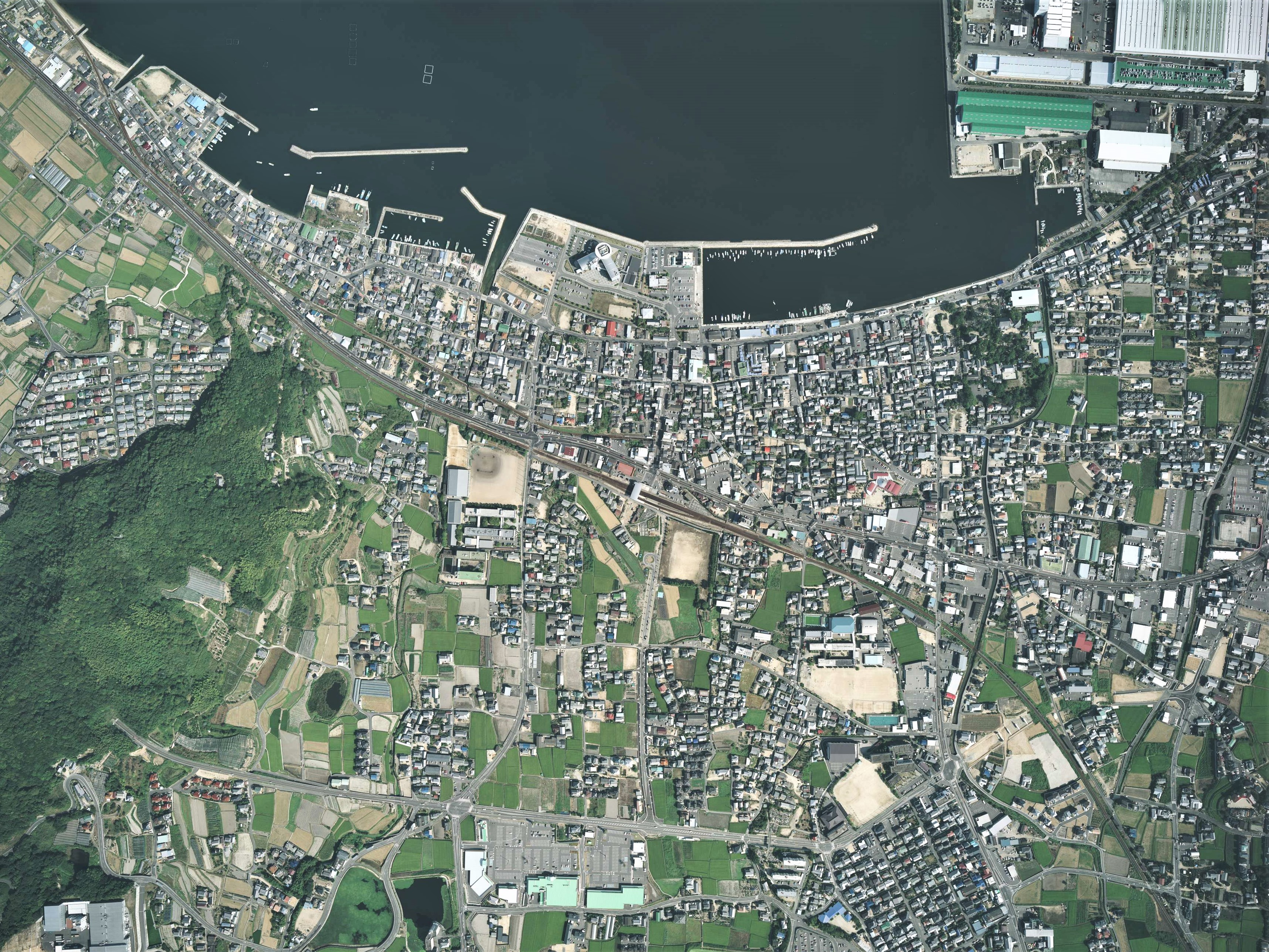
Aerial view of Shido district, Sanuki city center

Sanuki (さぬき市, Sanuki-shi; Japanese pronunciation: [sä́.nɨ̀.kʲì, sä̀.nɨ́.kʲí, sä̀.nɨ́.kʲi̥.ɕì]) is a city in Kagawa Prefecture, Japan. As of 1 September 2022, the city had an estimated population of 46,016 in 20847 households and a population density of and a population density of 290 persons per km^{2}. The total area of the city is 158.63 square kilometres (61.25 sq mi).

== Geography ==
Sanuki is located in northeast Kagawa Prefecture, on the island of Shikoku, facing the Seto Inland Sea to the north, and the Sanuki Mountains to the south. The city lies just east of the prefecture capital, Takamatsu.

=== Neighbouring municipalities ===
Kagawa Prefecture

- Higashikagawa
- Miki
- Takamatsu

Tokushima Prefecture

- Awa
- Mima

=== Climate ===
Sanuki has a humid subtropical climate (Köppen Cfa) characterized by warm summers and cool winters with light snowfall. The average annual temperature in Sanuki is 15.5 °C. The average annual rainfall is 1606 mm with September as the wettest month. The temperatures are highest on average in August, at around 26.3 °C, and lowest in January, at around 5.3 °C.

== Demographics ==
Per Japanese census data, the population of Sanuki has been relatively steady since the 1960s.

Historical population
Year	Pop.	±%
1920	45,243	—
1930	46,450	+2.7%
1940	44,972	−3.2%
1950	60,675	+34.9%
1960	56,901	−6.2%
1970	53,532	−5.9%
1980	55,576	+3.8%
1990	57,604	+3.6%
2000	57,772	+0.3%
2010	53,000	−8.3%
2020	47,003	−11.3%

== History ==
The area of Sanuki was part of ancient Sanuki Province and has been inhabited since ancient times, with many kofun burial mounds found within the city limits. During the Edo Period, the area was part of the territories of Takamatsu Domain. Following the Meiji restoration, out became part of Sangawa District, Ehime Prefecture in 1878, which became part of Kagawa Prefecture in 1888. The village of Shido was established with the creation of the modern municipalities system on February 15,1890, and was elevated to town status on February 11, 1898. The area became part of Ōkawa District, Kagawa in 1899. The city of Sanuki was created in 2002 by merging Shido with the neighboring town of Tsuda, Nagao, Sangawa and Ōkawa.

== Government ==
Sanuki has a mayor-council form of government with a directly elected mayor and a unicameral city council of 20 members. Sanuki contributes two members to the Ehime Prefectural Assembly. In terms of national politics, the city is in the Kagawa 2nd district of the lower house of the Diet of Japan.

== Economy ==
Sanuki has a mixed economy centered on agriculture and manufacturing, with a number of industrial parks .

== Education ==
Sanuki has seven public elementary schools and three public middle schools operated by the city government, and three public high schools operated by the Kagawa Prefectural Board of Education. In addition, there is one private high school.

== Transportation ==
=== Railways ===
JR Shikoku - Kōtoku Line

- Tsuruwa - Sanuki-Tsuda - Kanzaki - Zōda - Orange Town - Shido

Takamatsu-Kotohira Electric Railroad - Nagao Line

- Nagao

Takamatsu-Kotohira Electric Railroad - Shido Line

- Kotoden-Shido

=== Highways ===
- Takamatsu Expressway
- National Route 11
- National Route 377

== Sister cities ==
- Eisenstadt, Austria, since October 11, 1993

== Local attractions ==
- Dolphin Center
- Kagawa Prefectural Kikaku park
- Nagao-ji, 87th temple in the Shikoku Pilgrimage, which holds Shamisen-mochitsuki, an annual New Year's event on January 2.
- Ōkubo-ji, 88th and final temple in the Shikoku Pilgrimage
- Shido-ji, 86th temple in the Shikoku Pilgrimage
- Tomida Chausuyama Kofun, National Historic Site
- Tsuda Kofun Cluster, National Historic Site
- Tsukahara no karafuro, the oldest sauna in Japan.

== Gallery ==
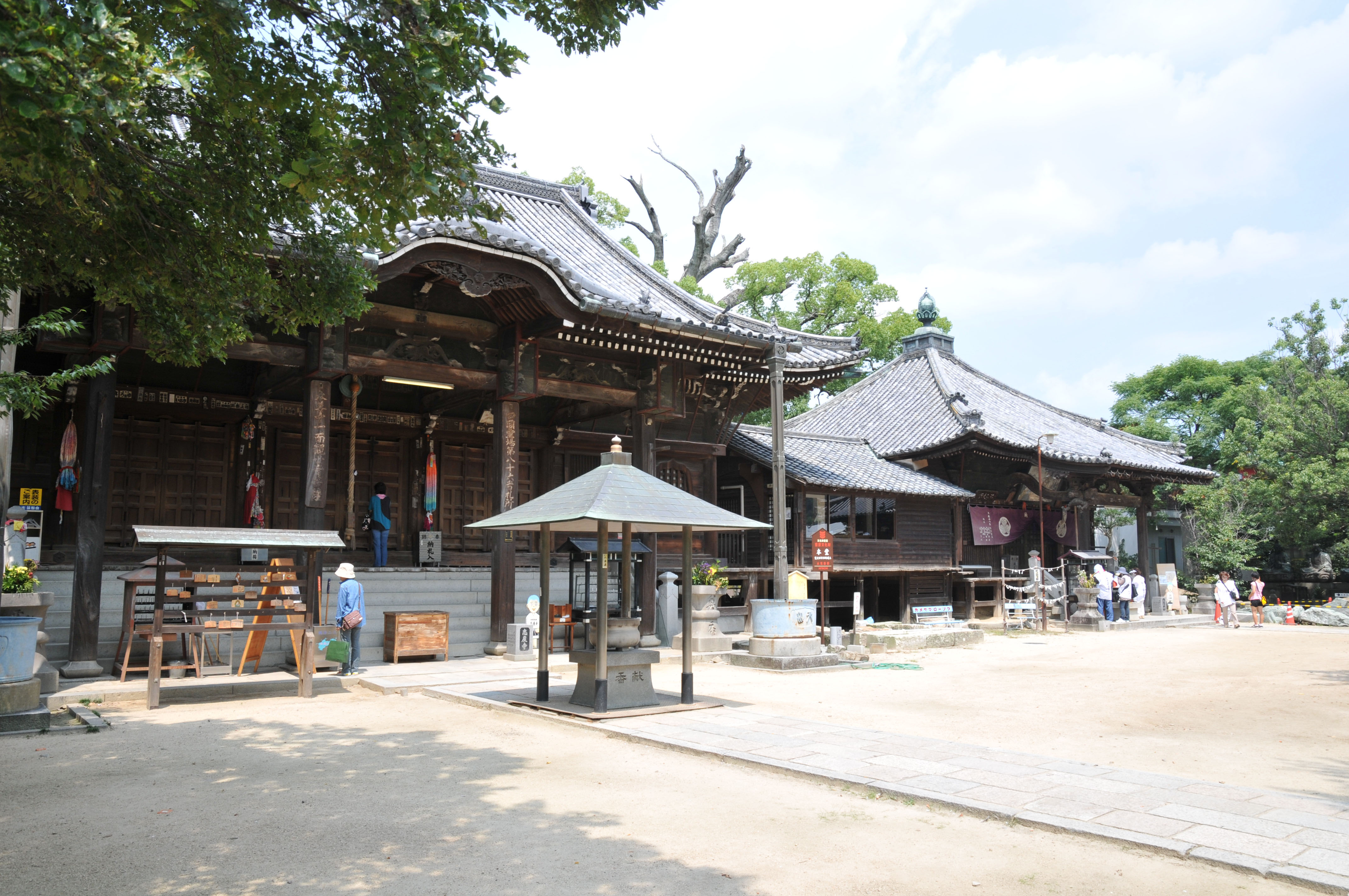
Shido Temple, a famous Shikoku Pilgrimage site

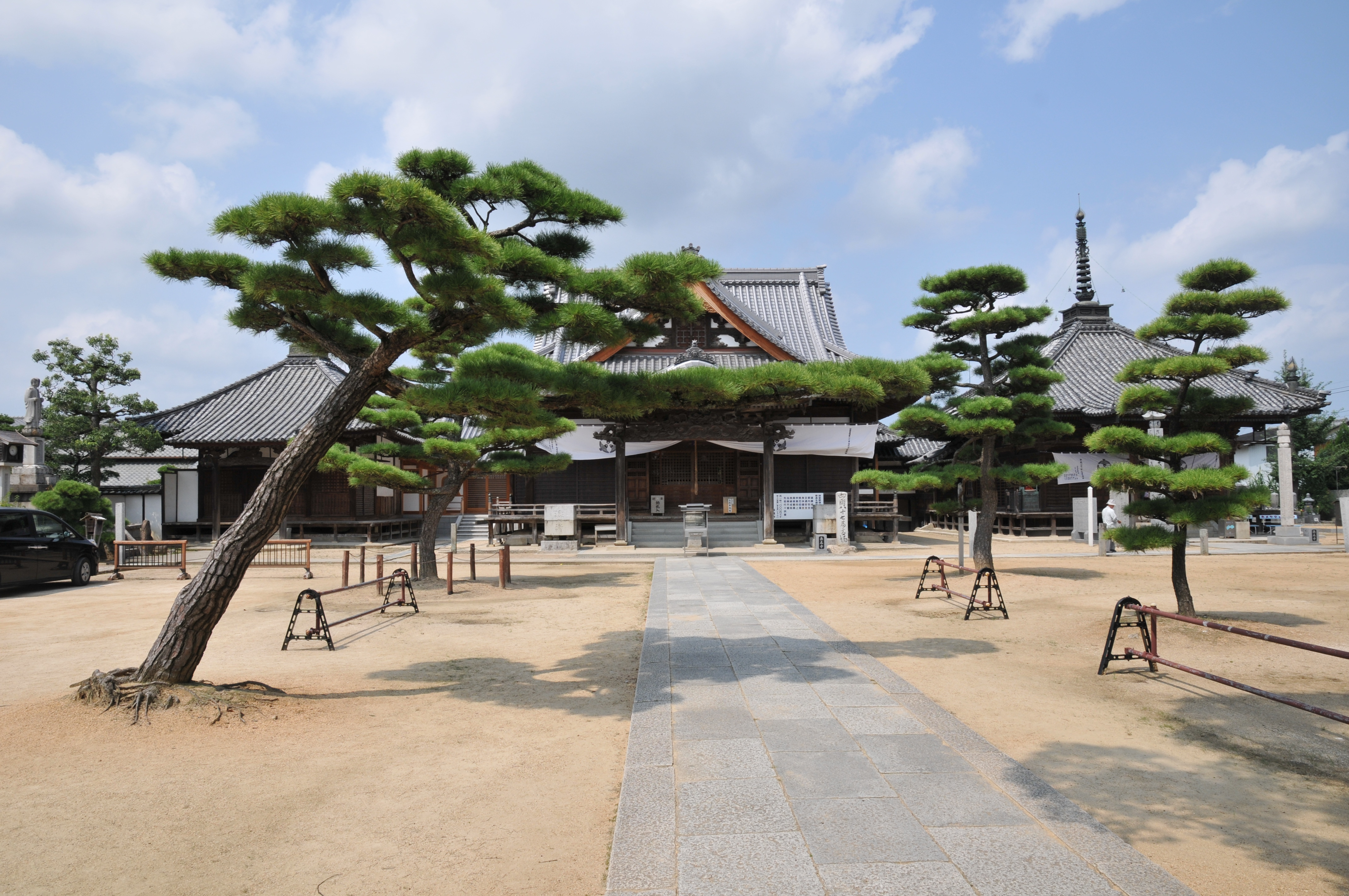
Nagao Temple, a Shikoku Pilgrimage site where the annual Shamisen-mochitsuki event is held.
