= Nagao-ji =

Buddhist temple in Sanuki, Kagawa, Japan

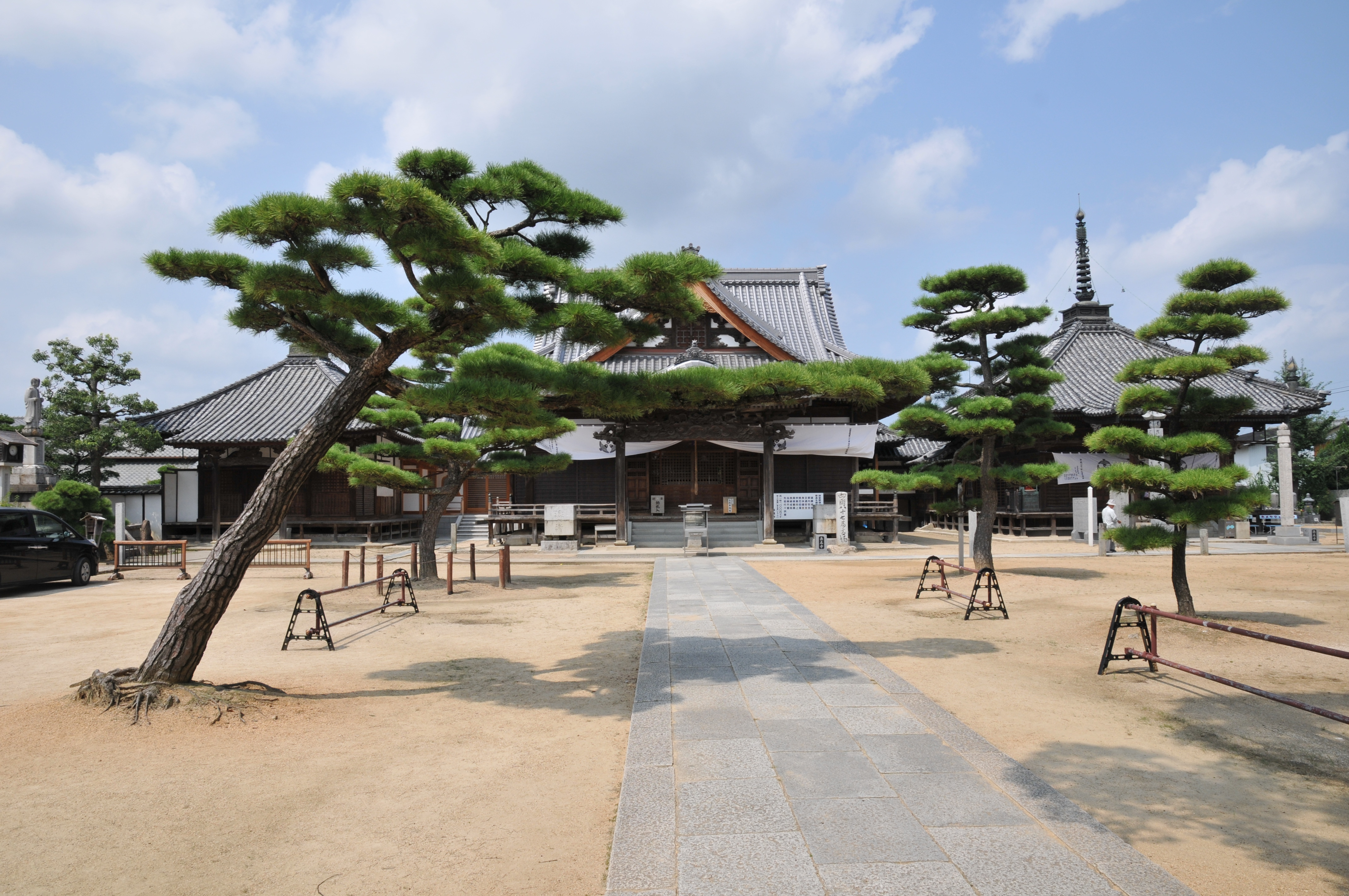

Religion
- Affiliation: Buddhism
- Sect: Tendai
- Deity: Shō Kannon
- Rite: Mantra: On arorikya sowaka

Location
- Location: Sanuki, Kagawa
- Country: Japan
- Interactive map of Nagao-ji
- Coordinates: 34°16′00″N 134°10′18″E

Architecture
- Founder: Gyōki
- Completed: 739

Nagao-ji (長尾寺) is a Tendai Buddhist temple in Sanuki, Kagawa, Japan. It is the 87th site of the Shikoku Pilgrimage.

== History ==
The history starts in 739 when Gyōki visited the site during his journeys around Shikoku. Kūkai conducted rituals there before going to China.

After returning from China, Kūkai visited the site and had the temple ground expanded, the ancient halls of the temple were destroyed in a fire and a war during the Tenshō era.

After the Meiji Restoration, the grounds were used for schools, a police station and country offices.

== Events ==
One of the traditional events held in the temple is the pounding of mochi which dates back to the Meiji Era.
