= Ōkawa, Kagawa =

Dissolved municipality in Kagawa prefecture, Japan

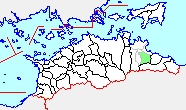
Ōkawa in Kagawa Prefecture

Ōkawa (大川町, Ōkawa-chō) was a town located in Ōkawa District, Kagawa Prefecture, Japan.

On April 1, 2002, Ōkawa, along with the towns of Nagao, Sangawa, Shido and Tsuda (all from Ōkawa District), was merged to create the city of Sanuki.
