= Orange Town Station =

Railway station in Sanuki, Kagawa Prefecture, Japan

T18 Orange Town Station オレンジタウン駅
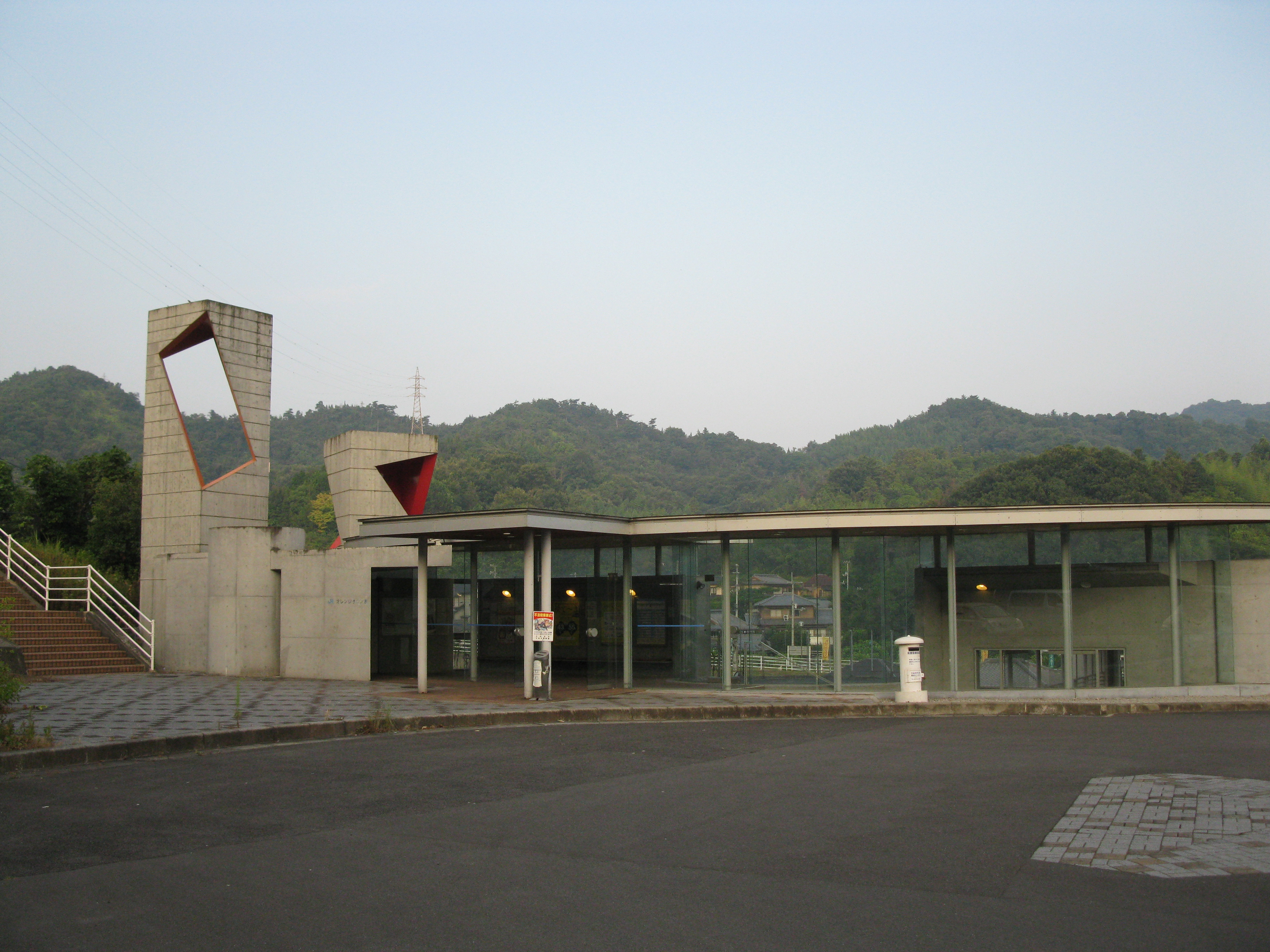
- Orange Town Station in 2010

General information
- Location: Toriuchi Valley, Shido, Sanuki City, Kagawa Prefecture 769-2101; Japan
- Coordinates: 34°18′06″N 134°10′51″E
- Operator: JR Shikoku
- Line: Kōtoku Line
- Distance: 18.9 km (11.7 mi) from Takamatsu
- Platforms: 1 island platform
- Tracks: 2

Construction
- Structure type: At grade
- Accessible: No - access to island platform by footbridge

Other information
- Status: Unstaffed
- Station code: T18

History
- Opened: 14 March 1998; 28 years ago

Passengers
- FY2019: 238

Services
| Preceding station | JR Shikoku | Following station |
|---|---|---|
| Shido T19 towards Takamatsu | Kōtoku Line | Zōda T17 towards Tokushima |
Limited Express
| Shido T19 towards Kojima | Uzushio | Sanuki-Tsuda T15 towards Tokushima |
Location
- Location within Kagawa Prefecture Location within Japan

Orange Town Station (オレンジタウン駅, Orenji-taun-eki) is a passenger railway station located in the city of Sanuki, Kagawa Prefecture, Japan. It is operated by JR Shikoku and has the station number "T18".

== Lines ==
Orange Town Station is served by the JR Shikoku Kōtoku Line and is located 18.9 km from the beginning of the line at Takamatsu. Besides local services, the Uzushio limited express between Okayama, Takamatsu and Tokushima also stops at the station.

== Layout ==
The station consists of an island platform serving two tracks. The station building of modernistic concrete design is unstaffed and serves only as a waiting room. Access to the island platform from the station building is by means of a footbridge which also gives access to the other of the tracks.

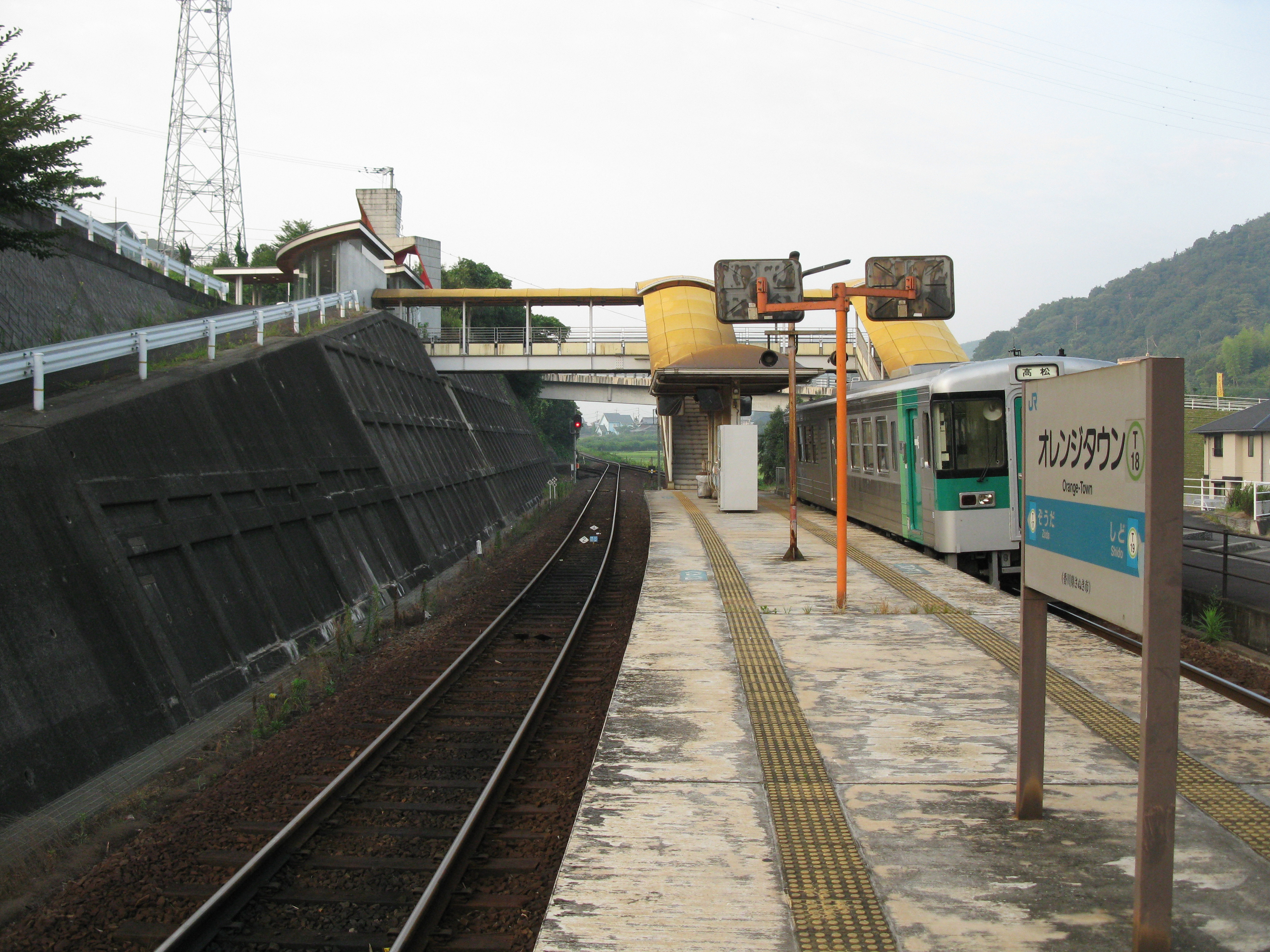
A view of the station platform. The station building can be seen to the left. The footbridge extends to the right, permitting access to the station from the other side of the tracks.

== History ==
Orange Town Station was opened on 14 March 1998 as an added station on the existing Kōtoku Line by JRShikoku.

== Surrounding area ==
- Orange Town Housing Area

== See also ==
- List of railway stations in Japan
