= Nibu Station =

Passenger railway station in Higashikagawa, Kagawa Prefecture, Japan

T13 Nibu Station 丹生駅
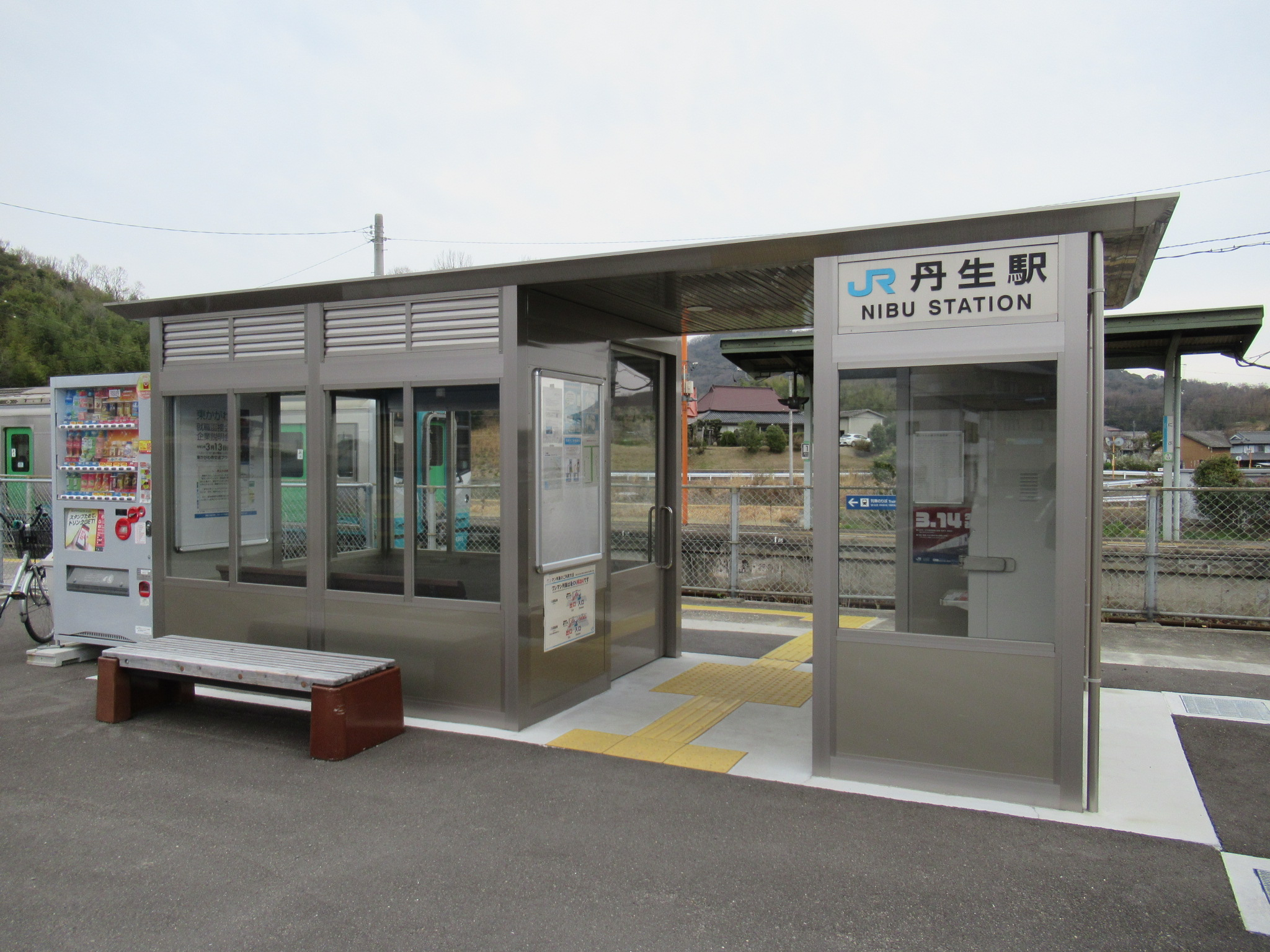
- Nibu Station, March 2020

General information
- Location: 41 Doi, Higashikagawa City, Kagawa Prefecture 769-2516; Japan
- Coordinates: 34°15′17″N 134°18′05″E
- Operator: JR Shikoku
- Line: Kōtoku Line
- Distance: 34.4 km (21.4 mi) from Takamatsu
- Platforms: 1 island platform
- Tracks: 2

Construction
- Structure type: At grade
- Accessible: No - island platform accessed by means of footbridge

Other information
- Status: Unstaffed
- Station code: T13

History
- Opened: 15 April 1928; 98 years ago

Passengers
- FY2019: 266

Services
Preceding station	JR Shikoku	Following station
Tsuruwa T14 towards Takamatsu	Kōtoku Line	Sambommatsu T12 towards Tokushima
Uzushio does not stop here
Location
- Location within Kagawa Prefecture Location within Japan

Nibu Station (丹生駅, Nibu-eki) is a passenger railway station located in the city of Higashikagawa, Kagawa Prefecture, Japan. It is operated by JR Shikoku and has the station number "T13".

== Lines ==
Nibu Station is served by the JR Shikoku Kōtoku Line and is located 34.4 km from the beginning of the line at Takamatsu. Only local services stop at the station.

== Layout ==
The station consists of an island platform serving two tracks. The station building is unstaffed and serves only as a waiting room. The island platform is accessed by means of a footbridge.

== History ==
Nibu Station was opened on 15 April 1928 as an intermediate stop when the Kōtoku Line was extended eastwards from Sanuki-Tsuda to Hiketa. At that time, the station was operated by Japanese Government Railways (JGR), later becoming Japanese National Railways (JNR). With the privatization of JNR on 1 April 1987, control of the station passed to JR Shikoku.

== Surrounding area ==
- Japan National Route 11

== See also ==
- List of railway stations in Japan
