= Kanzaki Station (Kagawa) =

Railway station in Sanuki, Kagawa prefecture, Japan

T16 Kanzaki Station 神前駅
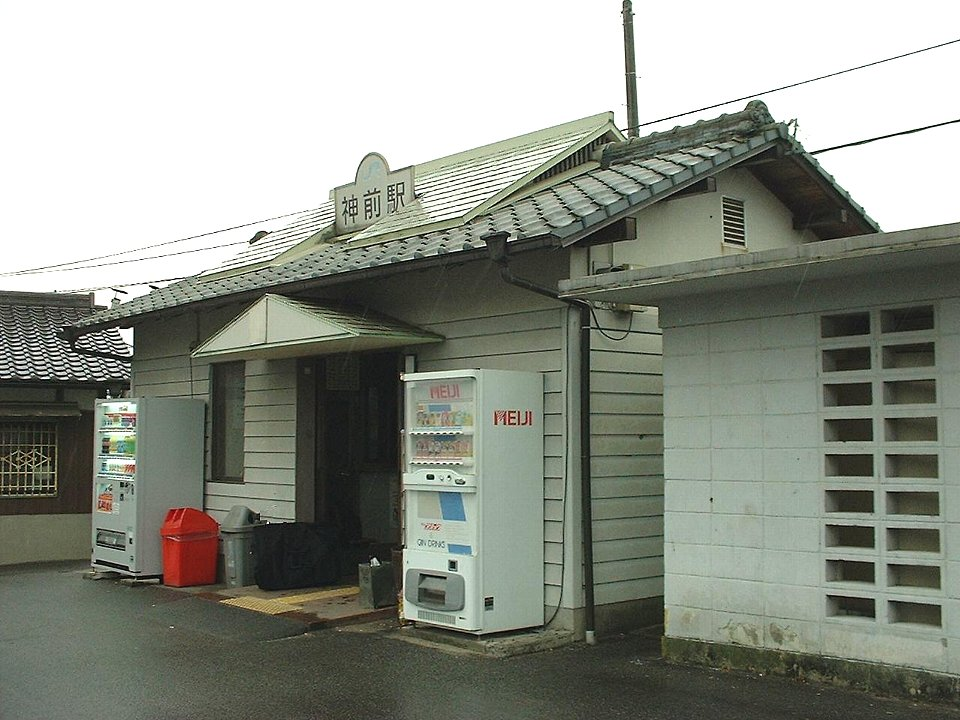
- Kanzaki Station, March 2003

General information
- Location: Sangawamachi Kanzaki, Sanuki City, Kagawa Prefecture 769-2323; Japan
- Coordinates: 34°16′58″N 134°12′33″E
- Operator: JR Shikoku
- Line: Kōtoku Line
- Distance: 23.4 km (14.5 mi) from Takamatsu
- Platforms: 1 side platform
- Tracks: 1

Construction
- Structure type: At grade
- Accessible: No - short flight of steps from station building to platform

Other information
- Status: Unstaffed
- Station code: T16

History
- Opened: 27 January 1952; 74 years ago

Passengers
- FY2019: 868

Services
Preceding station	JR Shikoku	Following station
Zōda T17 towards Takamatsu	Kōtoku Line	Sanuki-Tsuda T15 towards Tokushima
Uzushio does not stop here
Location
- Location within Kagawa Prefecture Location within Japan

Kanzaki Station (神前駅, Kanzaki-eki) is a passenger railway station located in the city of Sanuki, Kagawa Prefecture, Japan. It is operated by JR Shikoku and has the station number "T16".

== Lines ==
The station is served by the JR Shikoku Kōtoku Line and is located 23.4 km from the beginning of the line at Takamatsu. Only local services stop at the station.

== Layout ==
Kanzaki Station consists of a side platform serving a single track. The station building is unstaffed and serves only as a waiting room. A short flight of steps leads up to the platform, rendering the station non-wheelchair accessible.

== History ==
Japanese National Railways (JNR) opened Kanzaki Station on 27 January 1952 as an added stop on the existing Kōtoku Line. With the privatization of JNR on 1 April 1987, JR Shikoku assumed control and the stop was upgraded to a full station.

== Surrounding area ==
- Sanuki Municipal Kanzaki Elementary School
- Fujii Gakuen Samukawa High School

== See also ==
- List of railway stations in Japan
