= Yakuri-Shinmichi Station =

Railway station in Takamatsu, Kagawa Prefecture, Japan

Yakuri-Shinmichi Station 八栗新道駅
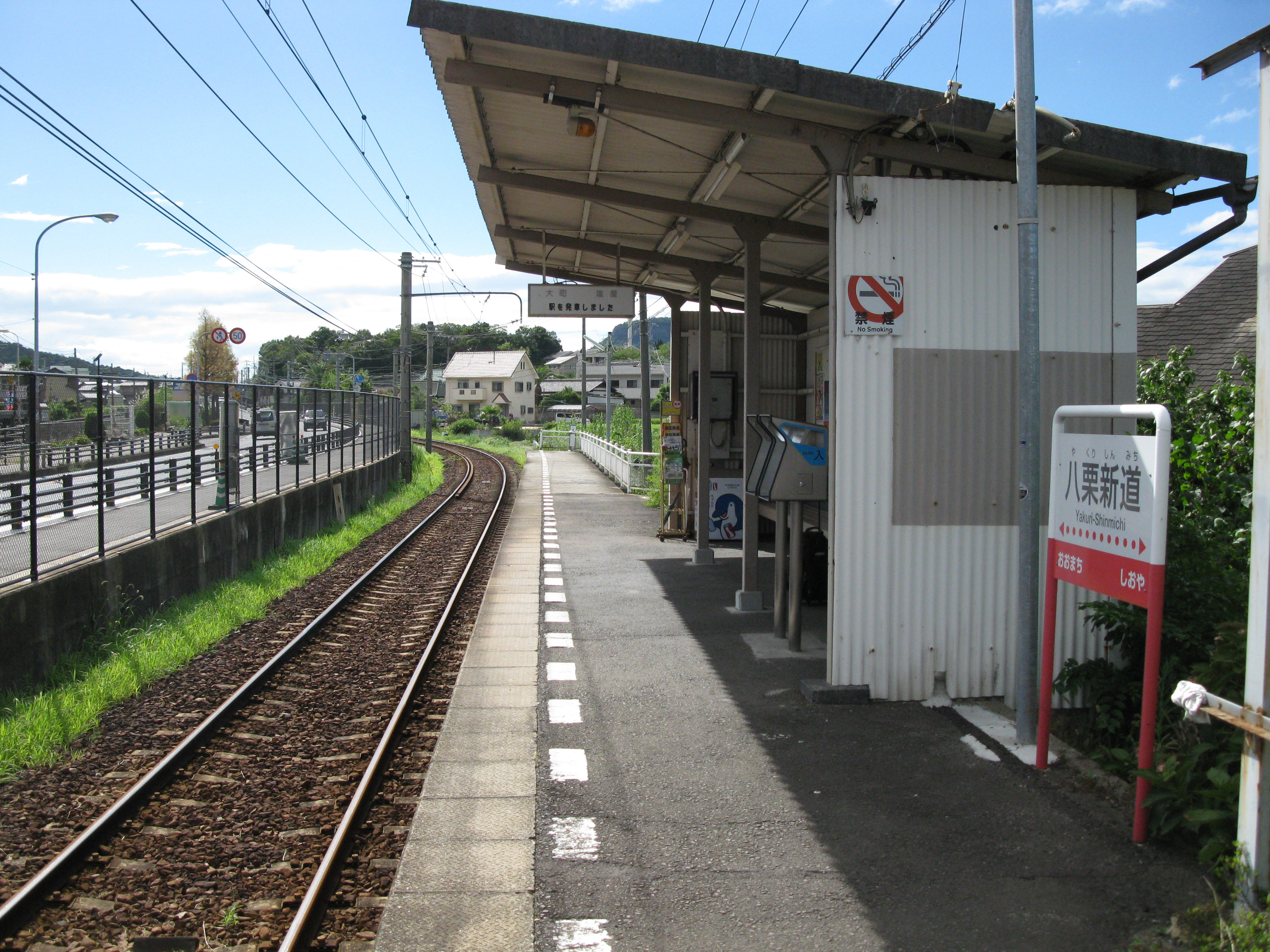
- Yakuri-Shinmichi Station platform

General information
- Location: Murecho Omachi, Takamatsu-shi, Kagawa-ken 761-0122; Japan
- Coordinates: 34.3367°N 134.1475°E
- Operator: Takamatsu-Kotohira Electric Railroad
- Line: ■ Shido Line
- Distance: 9.3 km from Kawaramachi
- Platforms: 1 side platform
- Connections: JR Shikoku: ■ Kōtoku Line (via Sanuki-Mure)

Construction
- Structure type: At-grade
- Parking: No
- Cycle facilities: Yes
- Accessible: Yes

Other information
- Status: Unstaffed
- Station code: S11

History
- Opened: February 25, 1955

Passengers
- FY2017: 203 per day
Location
- Location within Kagawa Prefecture Location within Japan

Yakuri-Shinmichi Station (八栗新道駅, Yakuri-Shinmichi-eki) is a passenger railway station located in the city of Takamatsu, Kagawa, Japan. It is operated by the private transportation company Takamatsu-Kotohira Electric Railroad (Kotoden) and is designated station "S11".

== Lines ==
Yakuri-Shinmichi Station is a station of the Kotoden Shido Line and is located 9.3 km from the opposing terminus of the line at Kawaramachi Station.

== Layout ==
The station consists of one side platform serving a single bi-directional track. The station is unattended.

== Adjacent stations ==
«	Service	»
Kotoden Shido Line
Ōmachi	Local	Shioya

== History ==
Yakuri-Shinmichi Station opened on February 25, 1955.

== Passenger statistics ==
Ridership per day
Year	Ridership
2011	225
2012	210
2013	211
2014	204
2015	206
2016	209
2017	203

== Surrounding area ==
- Sanuki-Mure Station, operated by JR Shikoku, is located across the Japan National Route 11 from this station.
- Japan National Route 11

== See also ==
- List of railway stations in Japan
