= Tomida Chausuyama Kofun =

Kofun period burial mound in Sanuki, Kagawa, Japan

Tomita Chausuyama Kofun
- 富田茶臼山古墳 (Japanese)
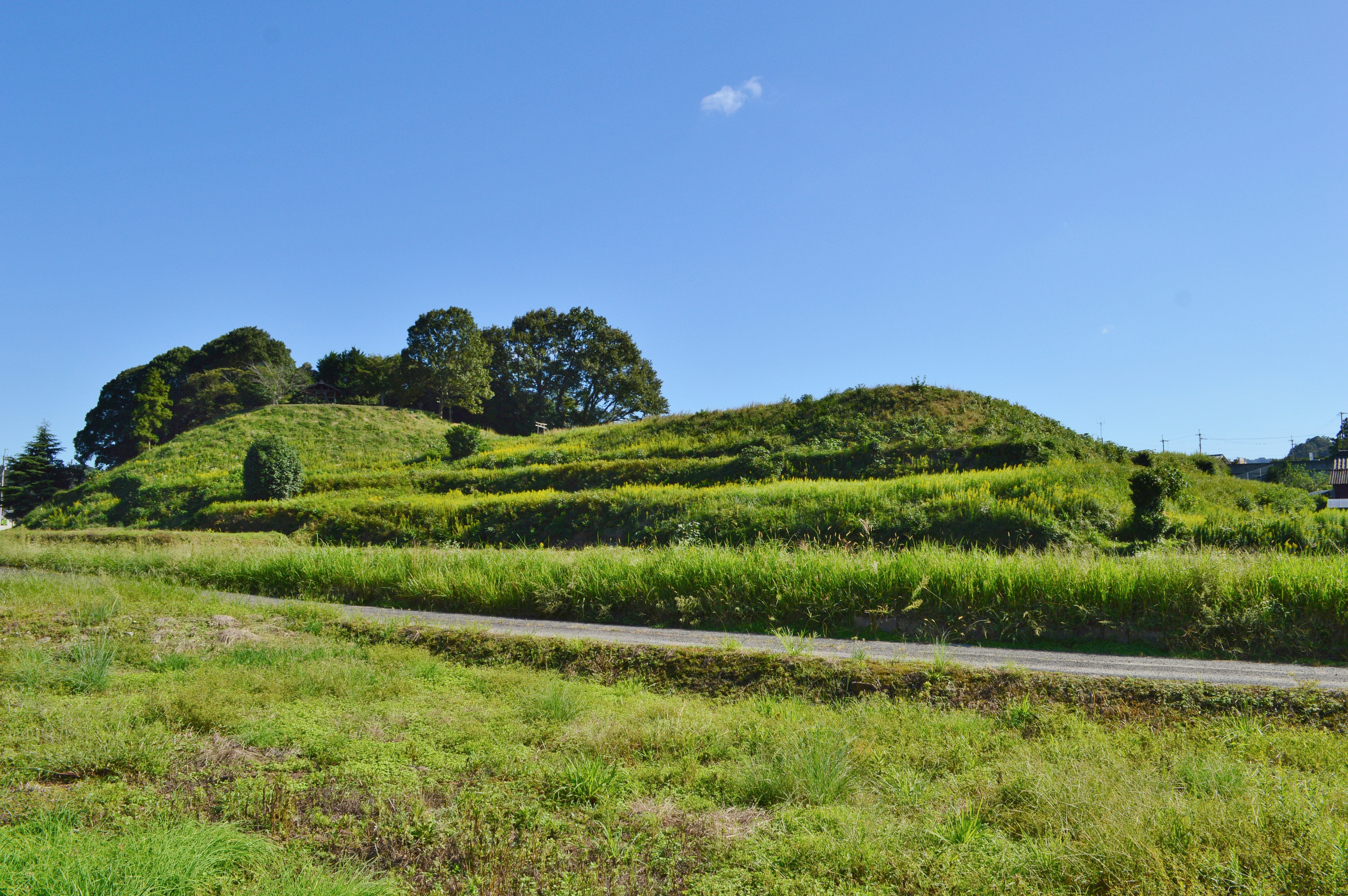
- Tomita Chausuyama Kofun

- Tomita Chausuyama Kofun Tomida Chausuyama Kofun (Japan)
- Interactive map of Tomita Chausuyama Kofun
- 34°15′35.86″N 134°14′38.39″E
- Type: Kofun
- Periods: Kofun period
- Location: Sanuki, Kagawa, Japan
- Region: Shikoku

History
- Built: early 5th century AD

Site notes
- Public access: Yes

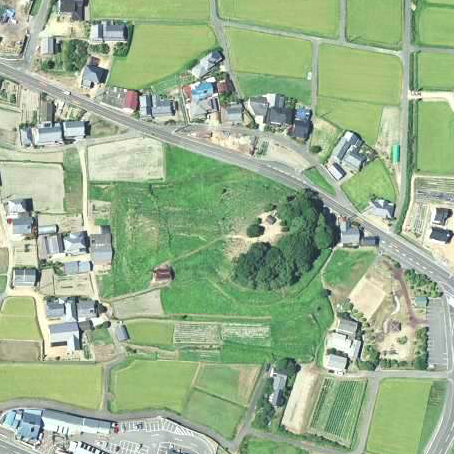
Aerial photo of Tomita Chausuyama Kofun

The Tomita Chausuyama Kofun (富田茶臼山古墳) is a kofun burial mound located in the Ōkawamachi Tomidanaka neighborhood of the city of Sanuki, Kagawa Prefecture, on the island of Shikoku of Japan. The tumulus was designated a National Historic Site in 1993. It is the largest burial mound in the Shikoku region, and is estimated to have been built around the middle of the 5th century (the latter half of the early Kofun period).

== Overview ==
The Tomita Chausuyama Kofun is located on the edge of a low hill on the eastern edge of the Nagao Plain in eastern Kagawa Prefecture. The Tsuda River flows to the north of the burial mound, meandering east and into Tsuda Bay, which opens into the Gulf of Harima on the Seto Inland Sea. Tsuda Port at the mouth of the river has been known since ancient times and there are many early burial mounds on the hills overlooking Tsuda Bay. The tumulus is a zenpō-kōen-fun (前方後円墳), which is shaped like a keyhole, having one square end and one circular end, when viewed from above. It has a total length of 139 meters and is orientated to the west. The tumulus was constructed in three tiers, and some 3000 fukiishi have been found on the second and third tiers only. Numerous fragments of haniwa, including cylindrical, morning glory-shaped, and house-shaped have been found on the surface. A shield-shaped moat with width of 13 to 20 meters surrounds the mound, bringing the total length including the moat to 163 meters. However, the shape of the mound had been considerably defaced. A Shinto shrine was built on top of the mound, and a Buddhist chapel on the east side of the posterior circular portion. The northern portion of the mound was truncated by the construction of Kagawa Prefectural Road No.10 and other parts of the mound were modified due to land clearing and urban encroachment. Thus far, archaeological excavations have been conducted in 1989, and in the surrounding area in 1993-1996; however, the burial chamber has not been excavated, and details are unknown. Local records indicate that the ceiling stone of the burial chamber was dug out in an attempt to build a sumo ring on the top of the round part of the mound in the Meiji period. From the haniwa and construction methods, the tumulus is estimated to have been built in the first half of the middle Kofun period, around the first half of the 5th century.

In subsequent investigations, three additional hōfun (方墳) square tumuli were discovered on the southwest and west sides of the burial mound. All three are from the first half of the 5th century and all have with moats surrounding them.

In the Edo Period, the tumulus was believed to have been variously the tomb of Yamato Takeru, Emperor Nintoku or his son Prince Nanba, or the tomb of the Sanuki kuni no miyatsuko Prince Kamukushi.

The tumulus is about 25 minutes by car from Sanuki-Tsuda Station on the JR Shikoku Kōtoku Line.

Overall length
139 meters
Posterior circular portion
90 meter diameter x 15 meter high x 3 tiers
Anterior rectangular portion
77 meters wide x 12.5 meters high x 3 tiers
Constriction width
56 meters

== See also ==
- List of Historic Sites of Japan (Kagawa)
