= Shido Station =

Passenger railway station

T19 Shido Station 志度駅
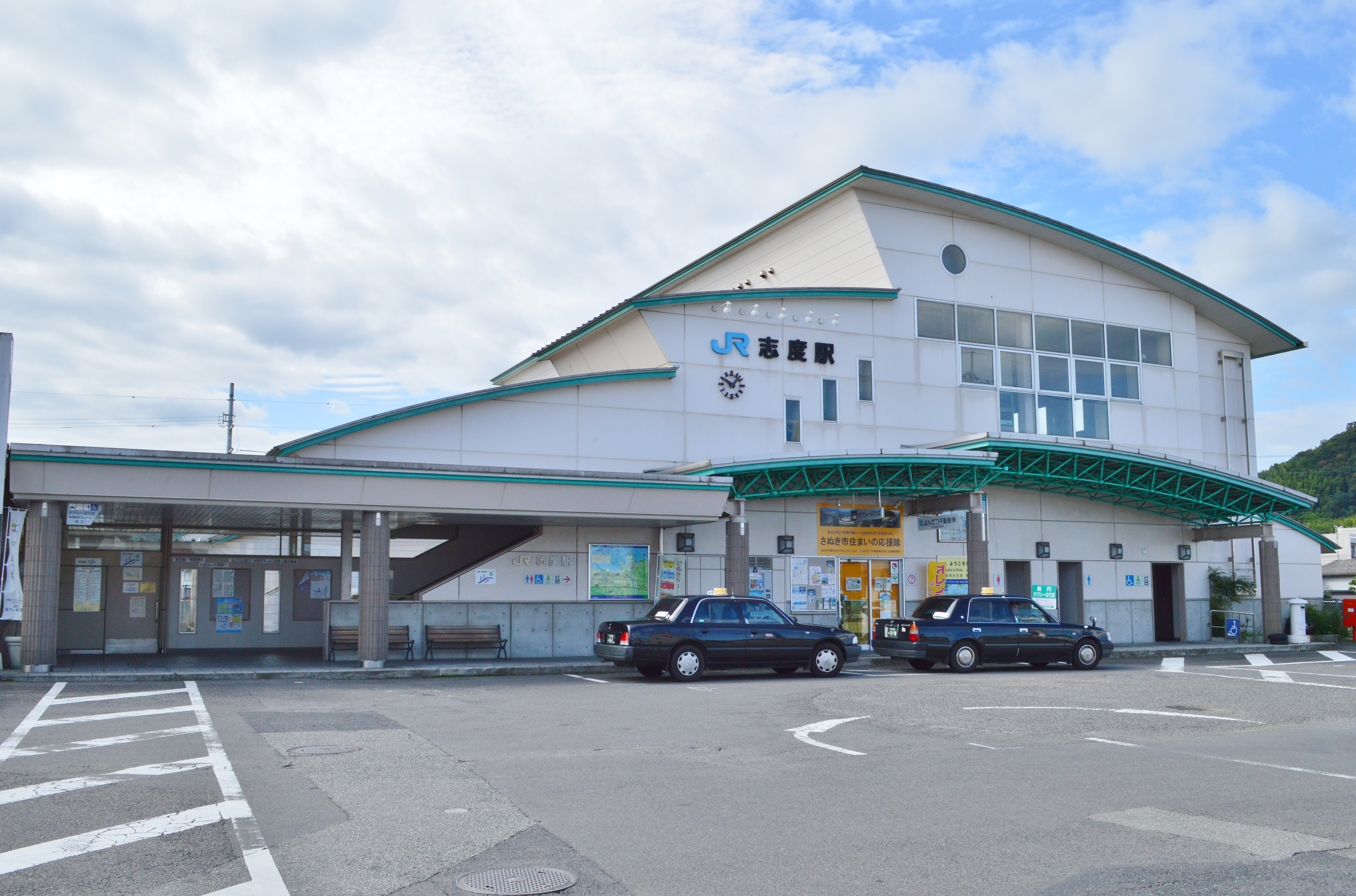
- Shido Station in 2016

General information
- Location: 488-2 Shido Gosho, Sanuki City, Kagawa Prefecture 769-2101; Japan
- Coordinates: 34°19′17″N 134°10′23″E
- Operator: JR Shikoku
- Line: Kōtoku Line
- Distance: 16.3 km (10.1 mi) from Takamatsu
- Platforms: 1 side + 1 island platform
- Tracks: 3

Construction
- Structure type: At grade
- Parking: Available but limited
- Accessible: Yes - bridge to platforms served by elevators

Other information
- Status: Staffed - JR ticket window (Midori no Madoguchi)
- Station code: T19
- Website: Official website

History
- Opened: 1 August 1925; 101 years ago
- Rebuilt: 17 April 1998; 28 years ago

Passengers
- FY2019: 2,024

Services
| Preceding station | JR Shikoku | Following station |
|---|---|---|
| Sanuki-Mure T20 towards Takamatsu | Kōtoku Line | Orange Town T18 towards Tokushima |
Limited Express
| Yashima T23 towards Kojima | Uzushio | Orange Town T18 towards Tokushima |
Location
- Location within Kagawa Prefecture Location within Japan

Shido Station (志度駅, Shido-eki) is a passenger railway station located in the city of Sanuki, Kagawa Prefecture, Japan. It is operated by JR Shikoku and has the station number "T19".

== Lines ==
The station is served by the JR Shikoku Kōtoku Line and is located 16.3 km from the beginning of the line at Takamatsu. Besides local services, the Uzushio limited express between Okayama, Takamatsu and Tokushima also stops at the station.

== Layout ==
Shido Station consists of a side platform and an island platform serving three tracks. The present station building, completed in 1998 is a hashigami (橋上) structure where passenger facilities are located on a bridge which spans the tracks. The station entrance is on the north side of the tracks from where elevators and stairs lead to the bridge structure on level 2 which houses ticket gates, a waiting room and a JR ticket window (with a Midori no Madoguchi facility). From the bridge, separate stairs and elevators connect to all platforms. The bridge also connects to a second station entrance from road on the south side of the tracks, where there is a roundabout and parking lots for cars. A JR Travel Centre (Warp Plaza) is located on level 1 of the station building.

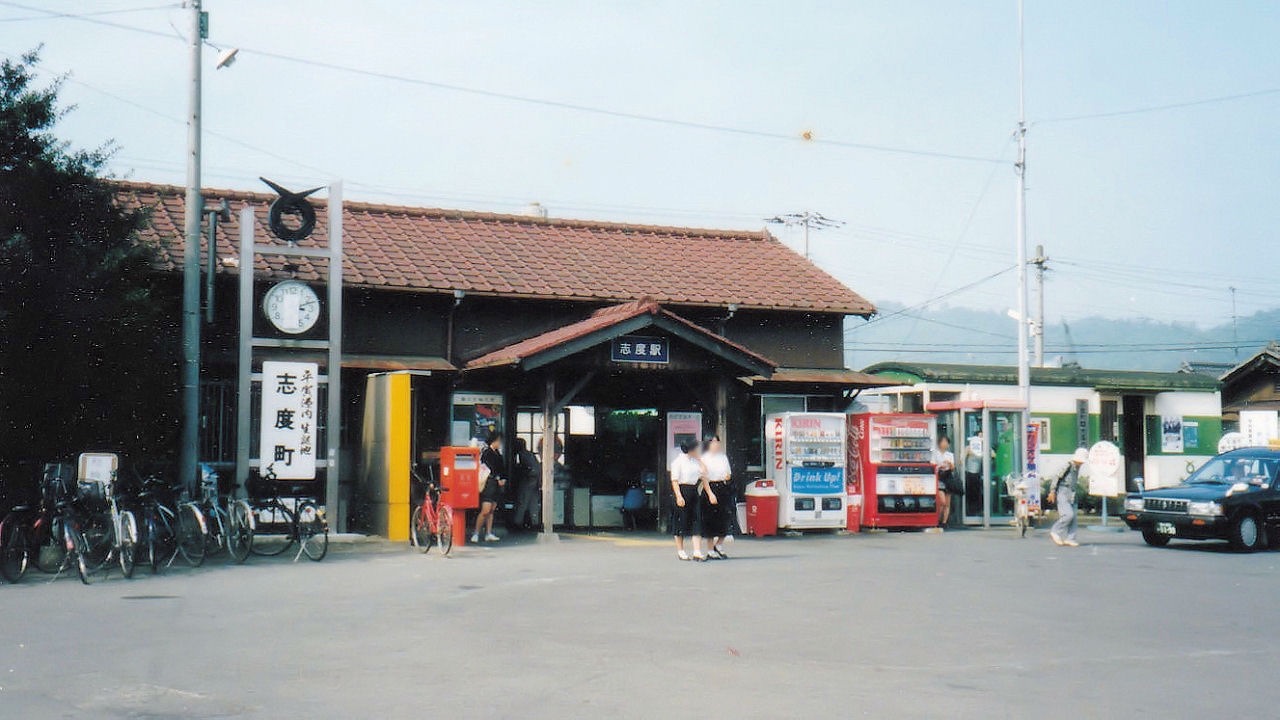
The old station building as seen in 1991.

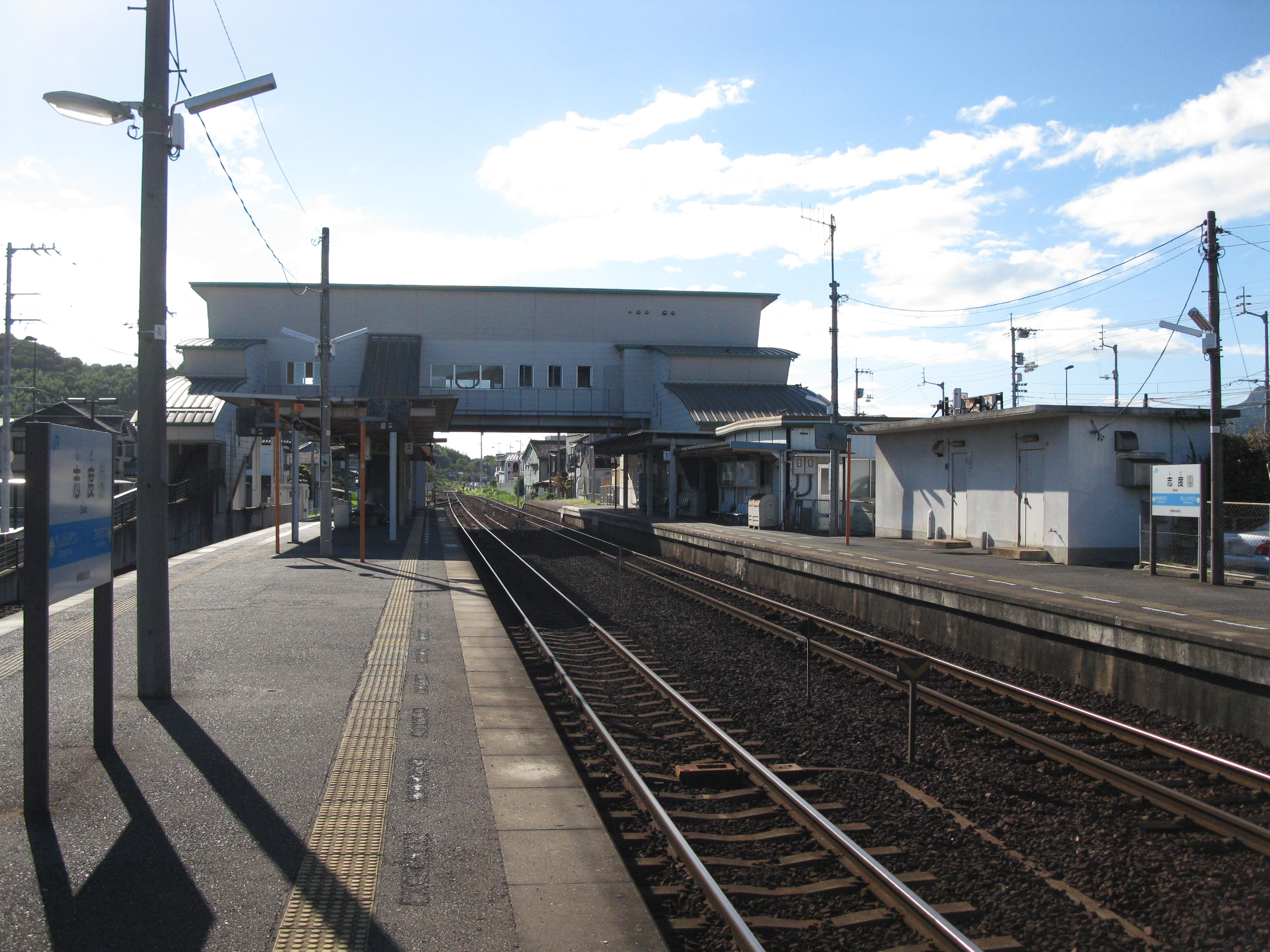
A view of the hashigami structure spanning the platforms and tracks. To the right is the station building. To the left is the island platform and the station south entrance.

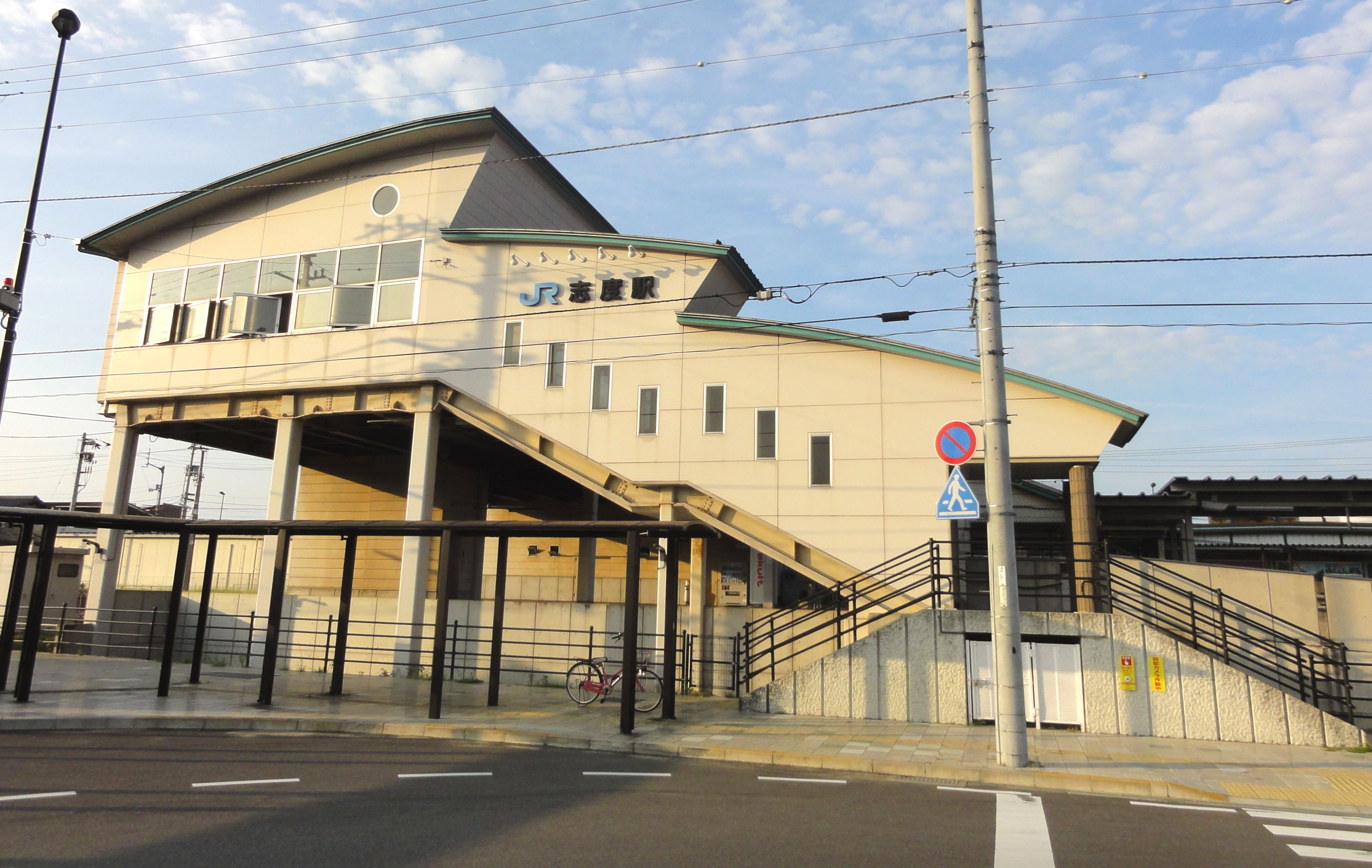
The south entrance of the station.

== History ==
Shido Station was opened on 1 August 1925 as the terminus of the Kōtoku Line was extended eastwards from Takamatsu. It became a through-station on 21 March 1926 when the line was further extended to Sanuki-Tsuda. At that time the station was operated by Japanese Government Railways, later becoming Japanese National Railways (JNR). With the privatization of JNR on 1 April 1987, control of the station passed to JR Shikoku.

== Surrounding area ==
- Sanuki City Hall
- Sanuki Municipal Shido Elementary School
- Sanuki Municipal Shido Junior High School
- Kagawa Prefectural Shido High School

== See also ==
- List of railway stations in Japan
