= SJ T21 =

Swedish diesel-hydraulic locomotive

T21
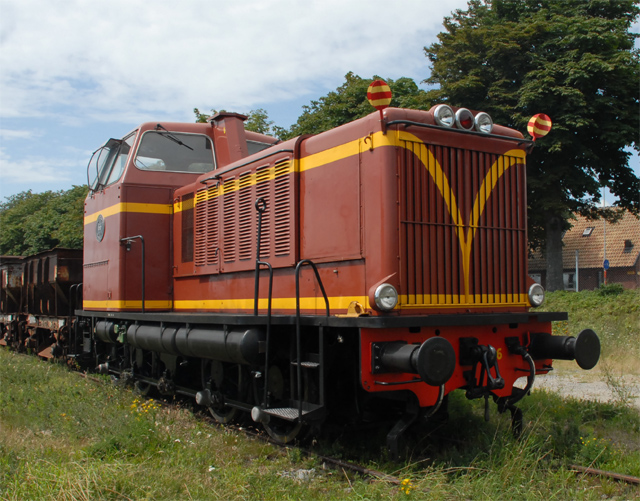
- SJ T21-66
Type and origin
- Power type: Diesel-hydraulic
- Builder: Maschinenbau Kiel; Svenska Järnvägsverkstäderna
- Build date: 1955–1959 (SJ); 1963 (NBJ)
- Total produced: 60
Specifications
- Configuration
  - UIC: D
- Gauge: 1,435 mm (4 ft 8 1/2 in)
- Wheel diameter: 1,255 mm (49.41 in)
- Length: 11,300 mm (37 ft 7/8 in)
- Loco weight: 56.8 tonnes (55.9 long tons; 62.6 short tons) tare weight
- Engine type: MaK MA 301A
- Cylinders: 8
- Transmission: Voith L37zU hydraulic
- MU working: Yes
- Train brakes: Air
Performance figures
- Maximum speed: 80 km/h (50 mph)
- Power output: 590 kW (790 hp)
- Tractive effort: 170 kN (38,000 lb_{f})
Career
- Operators: Statens Järnvägar
- Numbers: 57–112

T21, originally T2, is a diesel-hydraulic locomotive operated by Swedish State Railways (Swedish: Statens Järnvägar, SJ) and Nora Bergslags Järnväg (NBJ) of Sweden. 60 units were built between 1955 and 1963 by Maschinenbau Kiel and Svenska Järnvägsverkstäderna, based on the German DB Class V65 and technically identical to the MaK 800D. The class replaced steam locomotives on branch lines and remained in service until the 1990s.

== Design ==
Each locomotive had an eight-cylinder MaK MA 301A diesel engine driving a Voith L37zU hydraulic transmission, with an output of 590 kW (791 hp). It had compressed-air and hand brakes and equipment for multiple working.

The order consisted of 56 locomotives, of which ten were to be built in Sweden with a Swedish hydraulic transmission, designated T3, later T22. The Swedish transmission did not work well, and only four were delivered, the rest with a German transmission. Two units were later rebuilt to T21s. NBJ bought four T21 units in 1963.

== Gallery ==
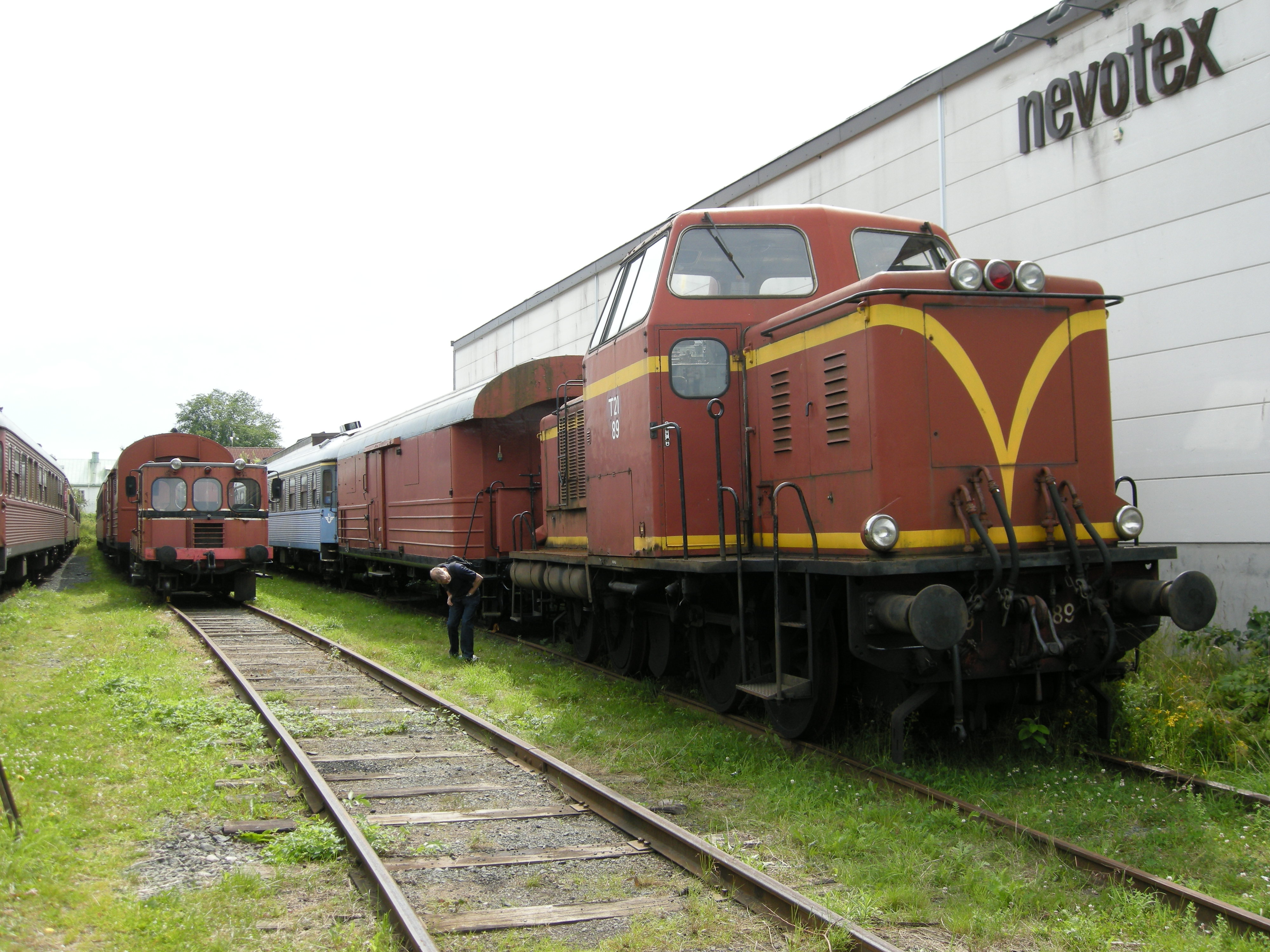
T21 89 preserved at the Nässjö railway museum

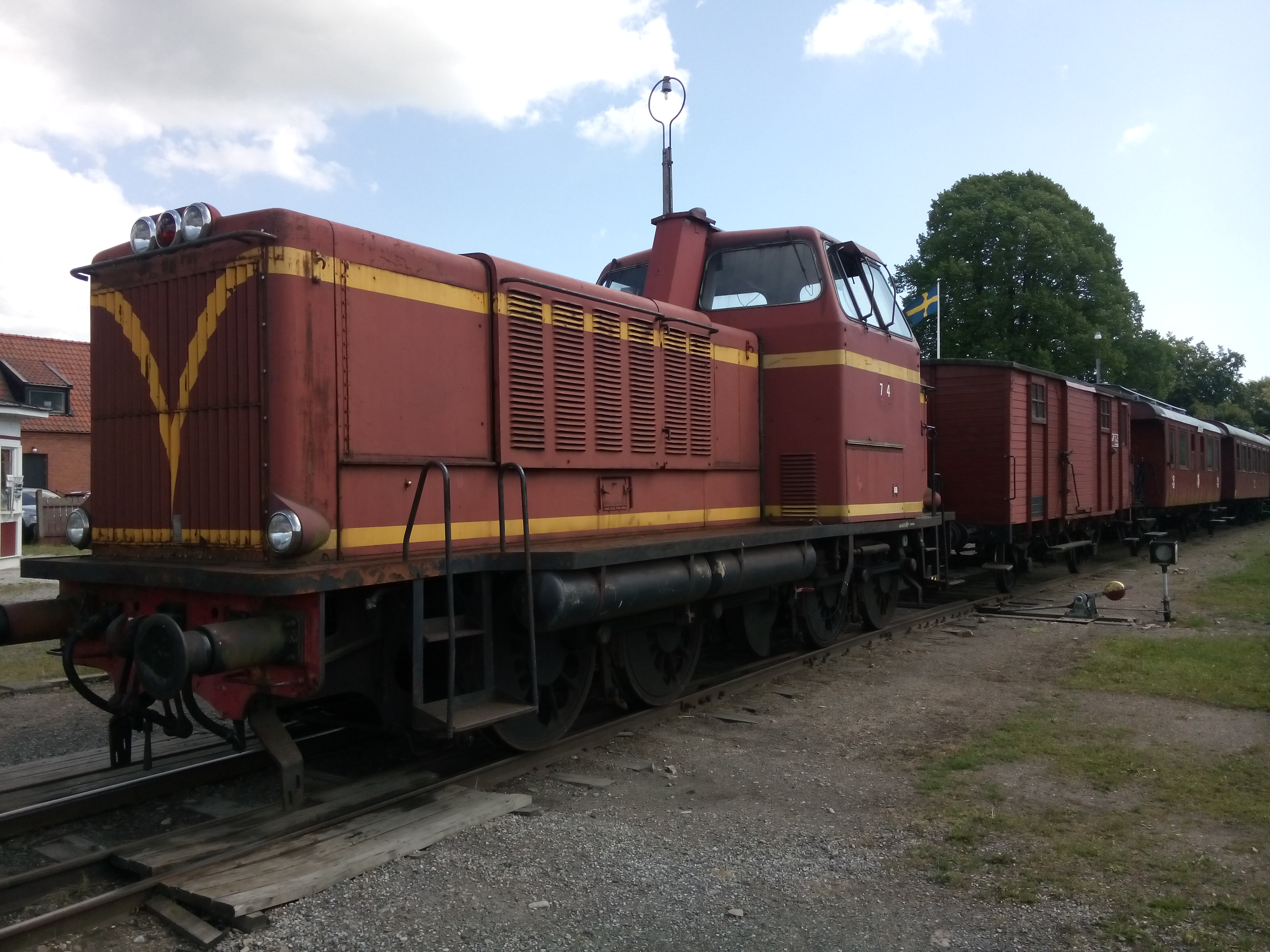
A T21 with goods vans at St Olof on the Skånska Järnvägar heritage railway

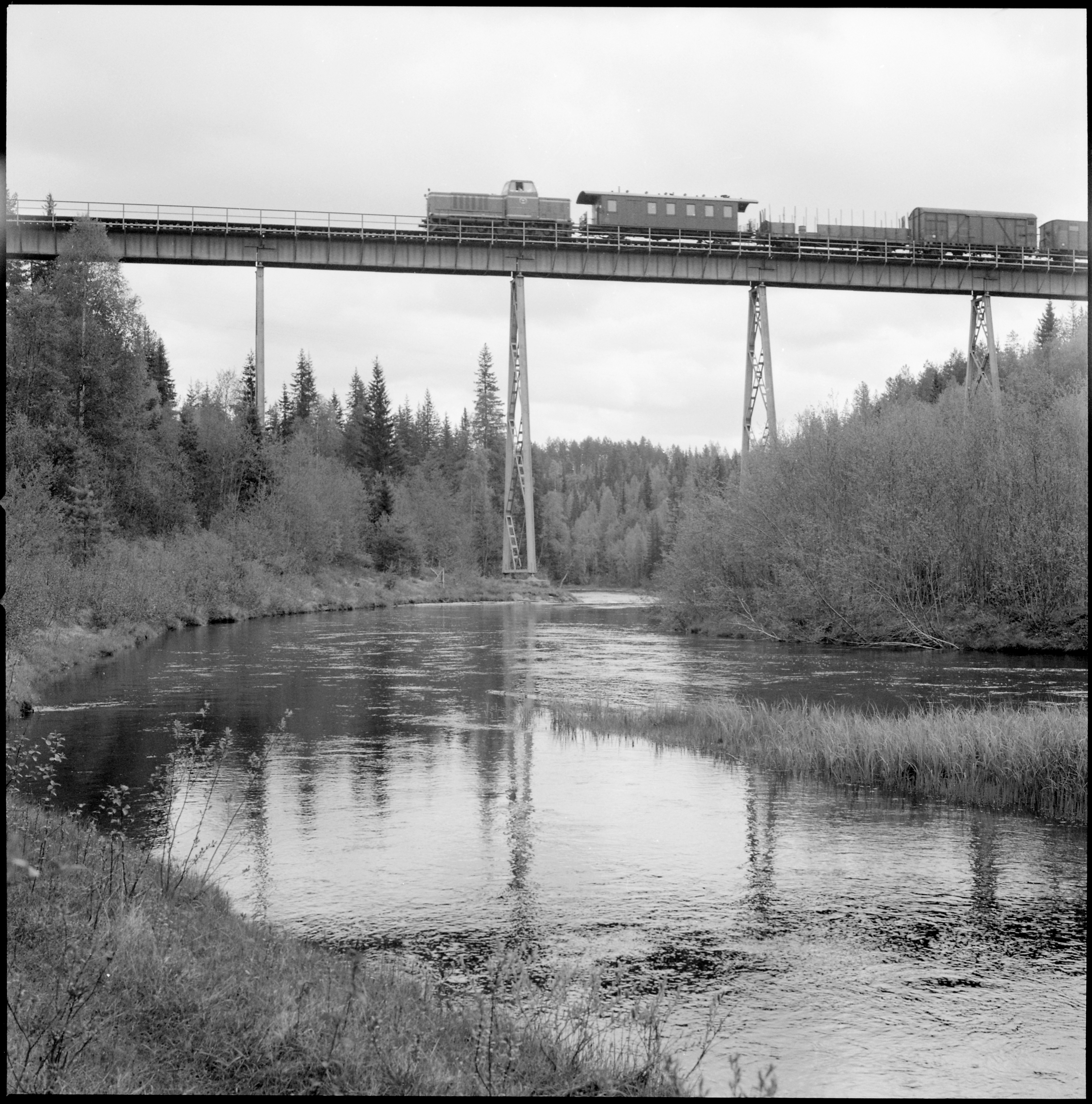
A T21 hauling a local goods train across the Röån bridge
