= Yakuriguchi Station =

Passenger railway station in Takamatsu, Kagawa Prefecture, Japan

T21 Yakuriguchi Station 八栗口駅
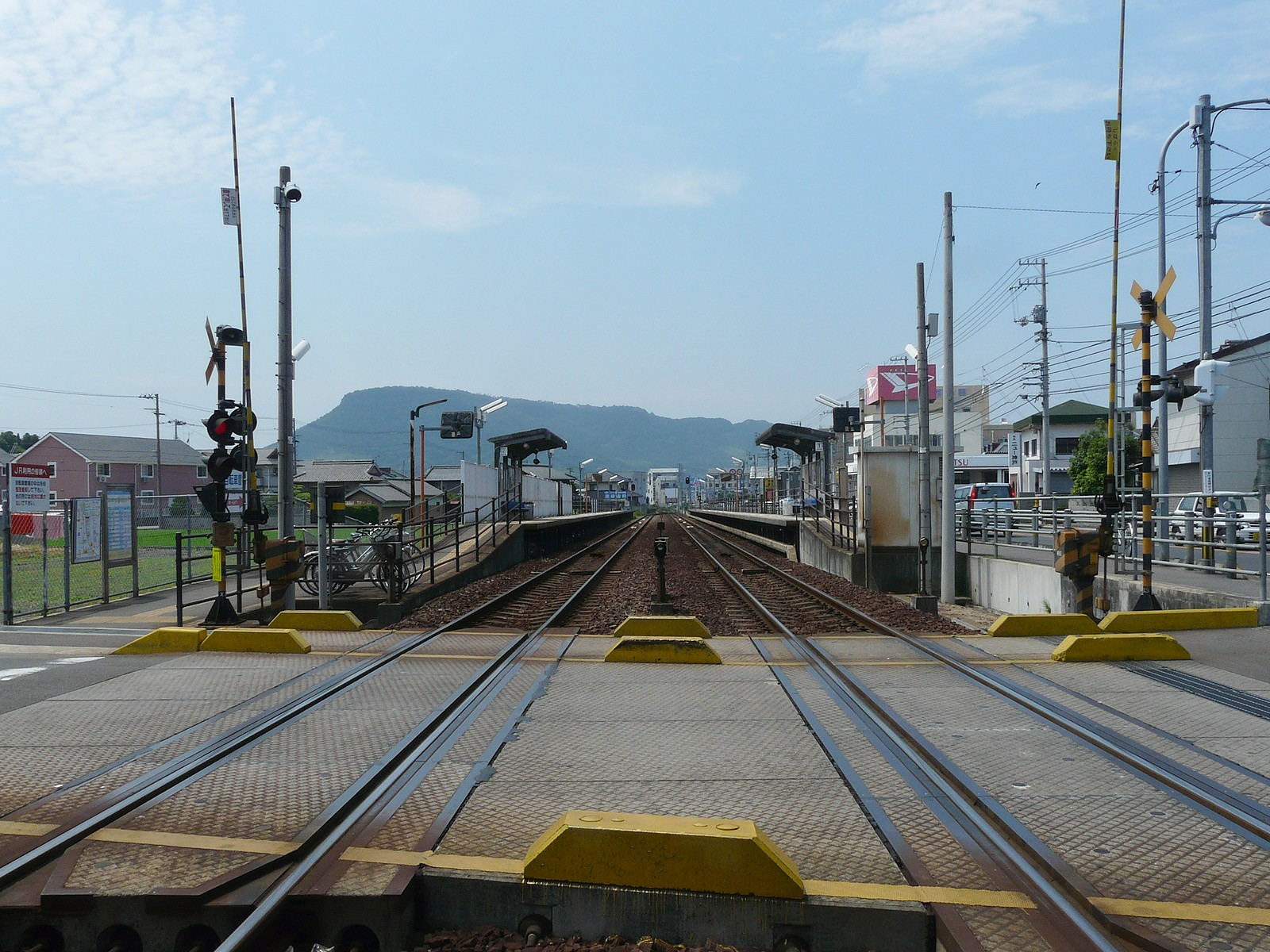
- Yakuriguchi Station, July 2007

General information
- Location: 249-2 Nakadai, Murecho Mure, Takamatsu City, Kagawa Prefecture 761-0121; Japan
- Coordinates: 34°20′25″N 134°08′05″E
- Operator: JR Shikoku
- Line: Kōtoku Line
- Distance: 12.3 km (7.6 mi) from Takamatsu
- Platforms: 2 side platforms
- Tracks: 2

Construction
- Structure type: At grade
- Cycle facilities: Bike parking under platform
- Accessible: Yes - ramps lead up to platforms

Other information
- Status: Unstaffed
- Station code: T21

History
- Opened: 1 September 1961; 64 years ago

Passengers
- FY2019: 490

Services
Preceding station	JR Shikoku	Following station
Furutakamatsu-Minami T22 towards Takamatsu	Kōtoku Line	Sanuki-Mure T20 towards Tokushima
Uzushio does not stop here
Location
- Location within Kagawa Prefecture Location within Japan

Yakuriguchi Station (八栗口駅, Yakuriguchi-eki) is a passenger railway station located in the city of Takamatsu, Kagawa Prefecture, Japan. It is operated by JR Shikoku and has the station number "T21".

== Lines ==
The station is served by the JR Shikoku Kōtoku Line and is located 12.3 km from the beginning of the line at Takamatsu. Only local services stop at the station.

== Layout ==
Yakuriguchi Station consists of two opposed side platforms serving two tracks. Track 1 on the north side is the through-track while track 2 is the passing loop. There is no station building and the station is unstaffed but shelters are provided on both platforms for waiting passengers. Bth platforms also have a "Tickets Corner" (a small shelter housing an automatic ticket vending machine). Separate ramps lead up to each platform from the access road. There is no direct link between the platforms and a nearby road level crossing must be used. Bicycle parking is provided underneath platform 2.

== History ==
Japanese National Railways (JNR) opened Yakuriguchi Station on 1 September 1961 as an added stop on the existing Kōtoku Line. With the privatization of JNR on 1 April 1987, JR Shikoku assumed control of the station. On 14 March 1998, the station was moved 300 m along the line further from Takamatsu.

== Surrounding area ==
  - Takamatsu City Hall Mure Branch
- Ōmachi Station on the Takamatsu Kotohira Electric Railway Shido Line
- Yakuri-ji temple

== See also ==
- List of railway stations in Japan
