= Matsushima-Nichōme Station =

Railway station in Takamatsu, Kagawa Prefecture, Japan

Matsushima-Nichome Station 松島二丁目駅
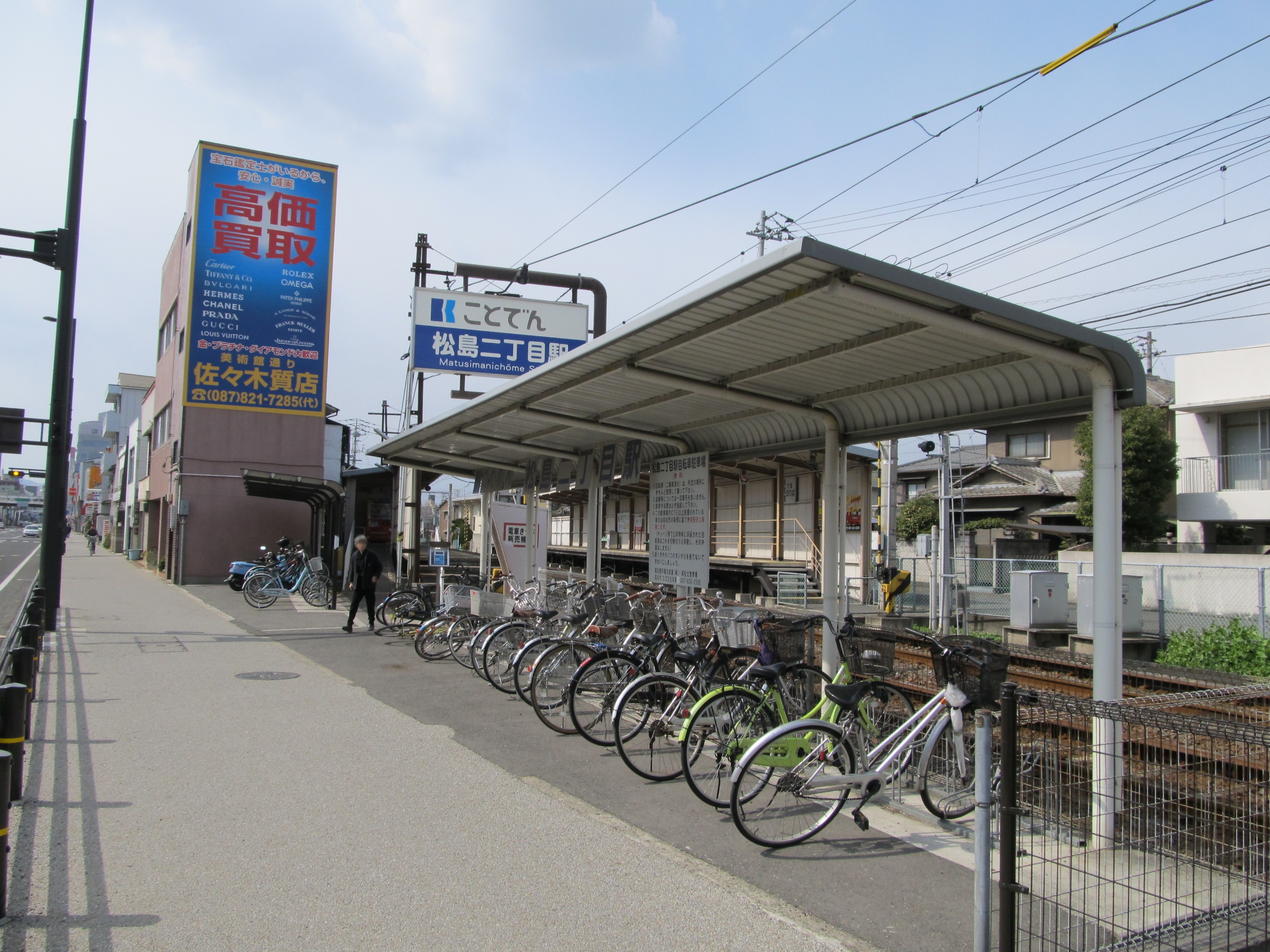
- Matsushima-Nichome Station in March 2011

General information
- Location: 2 Chome-15 Matsufukuchō, Takamatsu-shi 760-0068; Japan
- Coordinates: 34°20′24″N 134°3′52.5″E
- Operator: Takamatsu-Kotohira Electric Railroad
- Line: ■ Shido Line
- Distance: 1.2 km from Kawaramachi
- Platforms: 2 side platforms

Other information
- Station code: S02

History
- Opened: 18 November 1911
- Former names: Matsushima-Yonchōme (to 1971)

Passengers
- FY2018: 563 daily
Location
- Location within Kagawa Prefecture Location within Japan

Matsushima-Nichome Station (松島二丁目駅, Matsushima-Nichōme-eki) is a passenger railway station located in the city of Takamatsu, Kagawa, Japan. It is operated by the private transportation company Takamatsu-Kotohira Electric Railroad (Kotoden) and is designated station "S02".

== Lines ==
Matsushima-Nichome Station is a station of the Kotoden Shido Line and is located 1.2 km from the opposing terminus of the line at Kawaramachi Station.

== Layout ==
The station consists of two opposed side platforms serving two tracks. There is no station building. A level crossing connects the two platforms together. The station is unstaffed.

=== Platforms ===
1	■ Kotoden Shido Line	for Kawaramachi
2	■ Kotoden Shido Line	for Ōmachi, Kotoden-Shido

== Adjacent stations ==
«	Service	»
Kotoden Shido Line
Imabashi	Local	Oki-Matsushima

== History ==
Matsushima-Nichōme Station opened on November 18, 1911 as Matsushima-Yonchōme (松嶋四丁目駅). The station was moved 100 meters towards Kawaramachi Station in 1971, and was also renamed to the current name. In 1996, a passing loop was built at the station.

== Passenger statistics ==
Station usage
Year	Daily mean passenger count
2011	458
2012	466
2013	465
2014	494
2015	524

== Surrounding area ==
- Takamatsu Prison
- Takamatsu Municipal Takamatsu Daiichi Elementary School/Junior High School
- Takamatsu Central High School

== See also ==
- List of railway stations in Japan
