= Yakuri Station =

Railway station in Takamatsu, Kagawa Prefecture, Japan

Yakuri Station 八栗駅
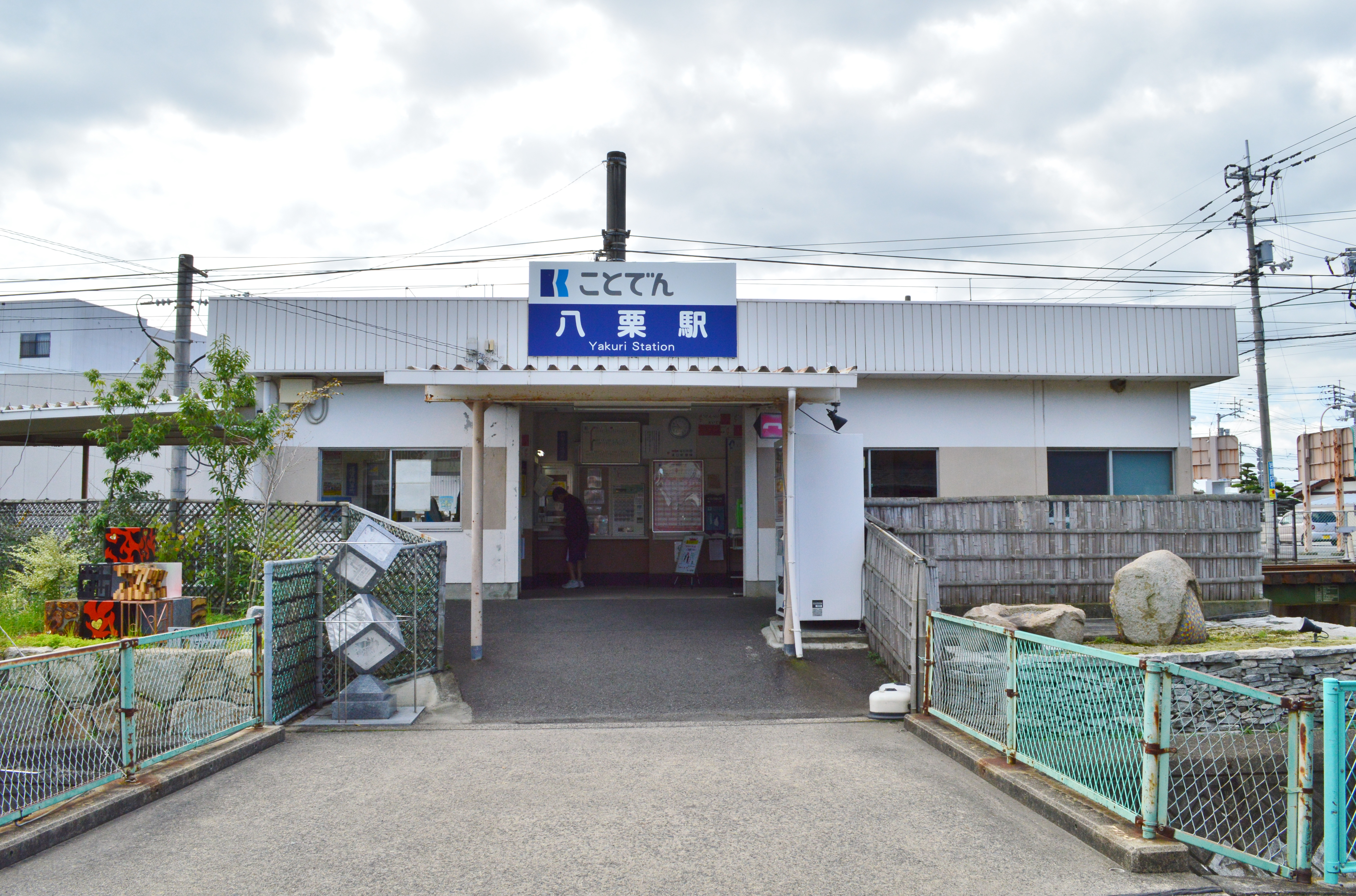
- Yakuri Station in October 2016

General information
- Location: Murecho Mure, Takamatsu-shi, Kagawa-ken 761-0121; Japan
- Coordinates: 34°20′40.7″N 134°7′19.2″E
- Operator: Takamatsu-Kotohira Electric Railroad
- Line: ■ Shido Line
- Distance: 6.7 km from Kawaramachi
- Platforms: 2 side platforms
- Tracks: 2

Other information
- Station code: S08

History
- Opened: 18 November 1911

Passengers
- FY2018: 930 daily
Location
- Location within Kagawa Prefecture Location within Japan

Yakuri Station (八栗駅, Yakuri-eki) is a passenger railway station located in the city of Takamatsu, Kagawa, Japan. It is operated by the private transportation company Takamatsu-Kotohira Electric Railroad (Kotoden) and is designated station "S08".

== Lines ==
Yakuri Station is a station of the Kotoden Shido Line and is located 6.7 km from the opposing terminus of the line at Kawaramachi Station.

== Layout ==
Yakuri Station features two side platforms serving two tracks. The station building is staffed, and is located to the north-west of the platforms. The platforms are connected by a level crossing.

=== Platforms ===
1	■ Kotoden Shido Line	for Kawaramachi
1	■ Kotoden Shido Line	for Ōmachi, Kotoden-Shido

== Adjacent stations ==
«	Service	»
Kotoden Shido Line
Furu-Takamatsu	Local	Rokumanji

== History ==
Yakuri Station opened on November 18, 1911 on the Tosan Electric Tramway. On November 1, 1943 it became a station on the Takamatsu-Kotohira Electric Railway.

== Surrounding area ==
- Yakuri-ji - 85th temple on the Shikoku pilgrimage
- Takamatsu Municipal Tateishi Folklore Museum
- Isamu Noguchi Garden Museum

== See also ==
- List of railway stations in Japan
