= Kotoden-Yashima Station =

Railway station in Takamatsu, Kagawa Prefecture, Japan

Kotoden-Yashima Station 琴電屋島駅
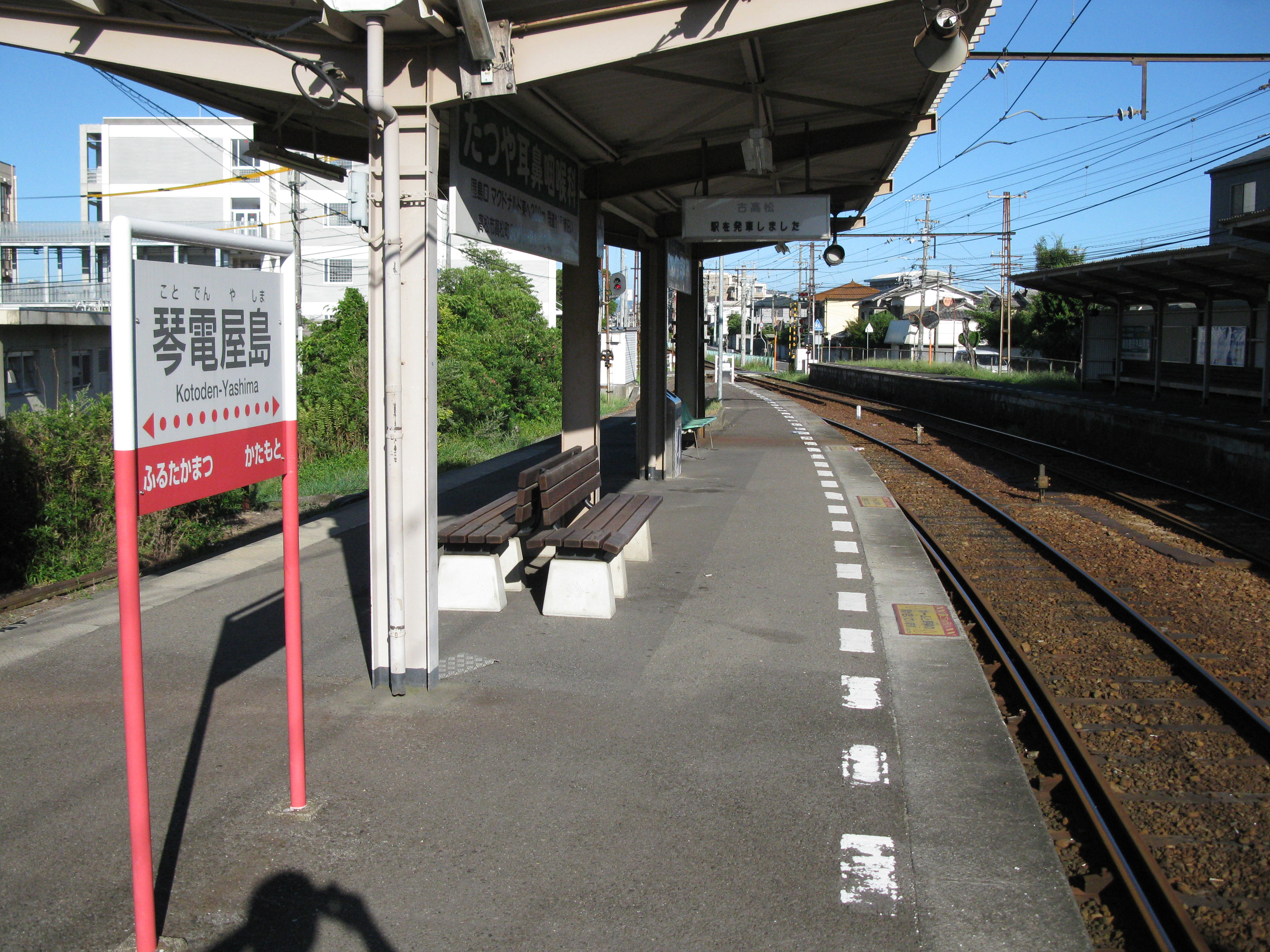
- Kotoden-Yashima Station platform

General information
- Location: Yashima Nakamachi, Takamatsu-shi, Kagawa-ken 761-0112; Japan
- Coordinates: 34°20′29.5″N 134°6′21.1″E
- Operator: Takamatsu-Kotohira Electric Railroad
- Line: ■ Shido Line
- Distance: 5.0 km from Kawaramachi
- Platforms: 1 side + 1 island platform
- Tracks: 3

Other information
- Status: Unstaffed
- Station code: C06

History
- Opened: 18 November 1911

Passengers
- FY2018: 790 daily
Location
- Location within Kagawa Prefecture Location within Japan

Kotoden-Yashima Station (琴電屋島駅, Kotoden-Yashima-eki) is a passenger railway station located in the city of Takamatsu, Kagawa, Japan. It is operated by the private transportation company Takamatsu-Kotohira Electric Railroad (Kotoden) and is designated station "S06".

== Lines ==
Kotoden-Yashima Station is a station of the Kotoden Shido Line and is located 5.0 km from the opposing terminus of the line at Kawaramachi Station.

== Layout ==
Kotoden-Yashima Station features a side platform and an island platform serving three tracks. However, only the side platform and one side of the island platform is used in regular service. The station building is located on the eastbound (side) platform, and the two platforms are connected by a level crossing. The station is unstaffed.

=== Platforms ===
1	■ Kotoden Shido Line	for Kawaramachi
2	■ Kotoden Shido Line	for Ōmachi, Kotoden-Shido

== Adjacent stations ==
«	Service	»
Kotoden Shido Line
Katamoto	Local	Furu-Takamatsu

== History ==
Kotoden-Yashima Station opened on November 18, 1911 on the Tosan Electric Tramway. On November 1, 1943 it became a station on the Takamatsu-Kotohira Electric Railway. The station building was marked as being a modern industrial heritage on February 6, 2009 by the Ministry of Economy, Trade and Industry.

== Surrounding area ==
- Yashima
- Takamatsu City Yashima Stadium
- Takamatsu Municipal Yashima Junior High School

== See also ==
- List of railway stations in Japan
