= Imabashi Station =

Railway station in Takamatsu, Kagawa Prefecture, Japan

Imabashi Station 今橋駅
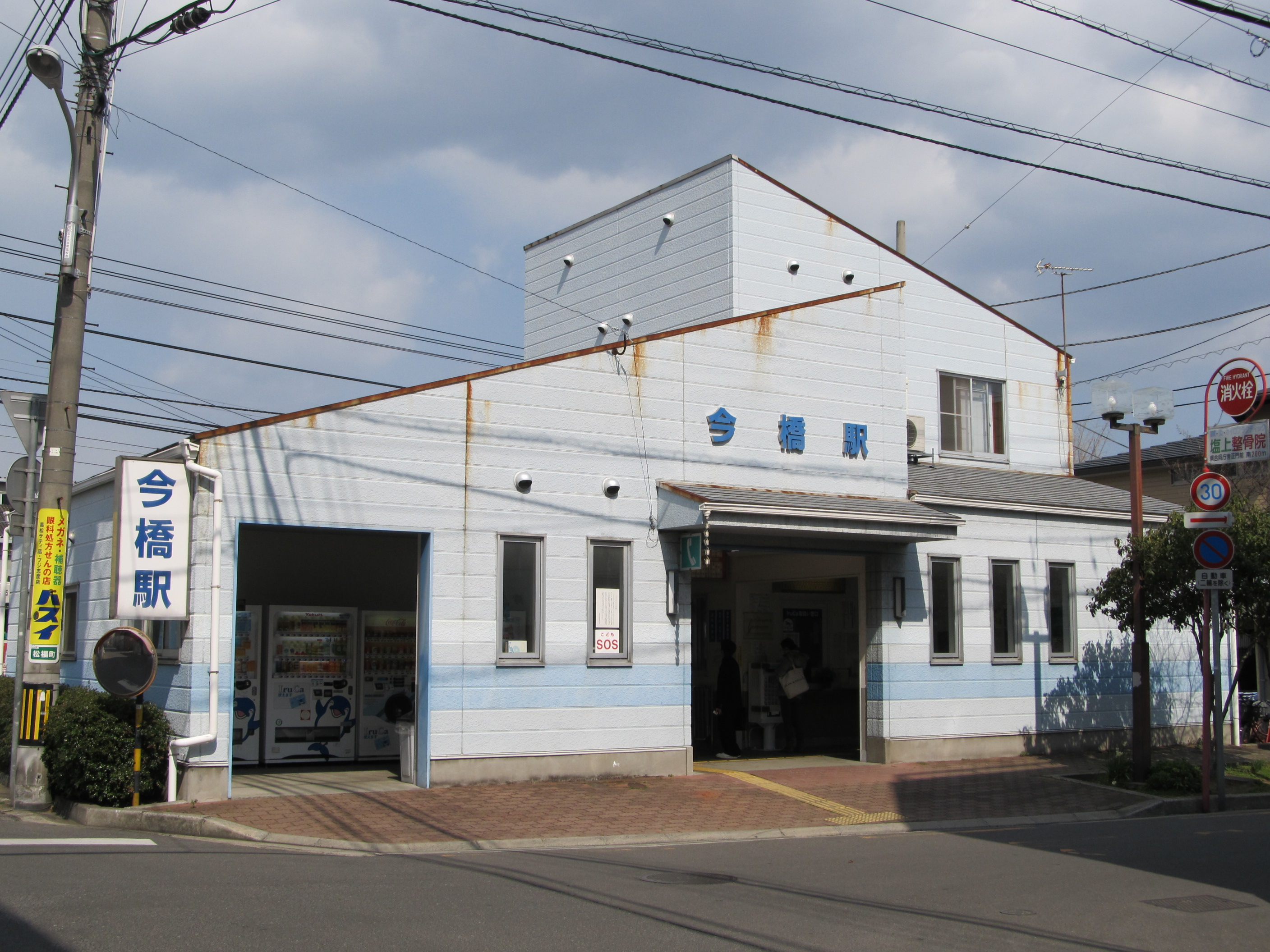
- Imabashi Station building in March 2011

General information
- Location: 1 Chome-2 Matsushimachō, Takamatsu-shi, Kagawa-ken 760-0068; Japan
- Coordinates: 34°20′29.6″N 134°3′31.6″E
- Operator: Takamatsu-Kotohira Electric Railroad
- Line: ■ Shido Line
- Distance: 0.6 km from Kawaramachi
- Platforms: 2 side platforms
- Tracks: 2

Other information
- Station code: S01

History
- Opened: 18 November 1911

Passengers
- FY2018: 658 daily
Location
- Location within Kagawa Prefecture Location within Japan

Imabashi Station (今橋駅) is a passenger railway station located in the city of Takamatsu, Kagawa, Japan. It is operated by the private transportation company Takamatsu-Kotohira Electric Railroad (Kotoden) and is designated station "S01".

== Lines ==
Imabashi Station is a station of the Kotoden Shido Line and is located 0.6 km from the opposing terminus of the line at Kawaramachi Station.

== Layout ==
The station consists of two opposed side platforms. The station building is next to the eastbound platform. A level crossing connects the two platforms together.

=== Platforms ===
1	■ Kotoden Shido Line	for Kawaramachi
2	■ Kotoden Shido Line	for Ōmachi, Kotoden-Shido

== Adjacent stations ==
«	Service	»
Kotoden Shido Line
Kawaramachi	Local	Matsushima-Nichōme

== History ==
Kotoden-Yashima Station opened on November 11, 1918 on the Tosan Electric Tramway. On November 1, 1943 it became a station on the Takamatsu-Kotohira Electric Railway. Two trains collided head on at the station on August 1, 1976, with 210 people injured.

== Surrounding area ==
- Takamatsu Children's Museum of the Future
- Takamatsu City Yumemirai Library
- Kagawa Prefectural Takamatsu Commercial High School

== See also ==
- List of railway stations in Japan
