= Shioya =

Shioya may refer to:

- Shioya, Tochigi, town in Tochigi Prefecture, Japan
- Shioya Station (disambiguation), train stations in Japan
- Shioya (surname)
