= Ōmachi Station =

Ōmachi Station can refer to:

- Ōmachi Station (Chiba), a station on the Hokusō Railway Hokusō Line in Ichikawa, Chiba Prefecture, Japan
- Ōmachi Station (Hiroshima), a station on the JR West Kabe Line and the Astram Line in Hiroshima, Hiroshima Prefecture, Japan
- Ōmachi Station (Hokkaidō), a tram stop of the Hakodate Transportation Bureau in Hakodate, Hokkaidō, Japan
- Ōmachi Station (Kagawa), a station on the Takamatsu-Kotohira Electric Railroad Shido Line in Takamatsu, Kagawa Prefecture, Japan
- Ōmachi Station (Saga), a station on the JR Kyushu Sasebo Line in Omachi, Saga Prefecture, Japan
- Ōmachi Station (Toyama), a tram stop of the Toyama Chihō Railway in Toyama, Toyama Prefecture, Japan
- Shinano-Ōmachi Station, a station on the JR East Ōito Line in Ōmachi, Nagano Prefecture, Japan
