= Oki-Matsushima Station =

Railway station in Takamatsu, Kagawa Prefecture, Japan

Oki-Matsushima Station 沖松島駅
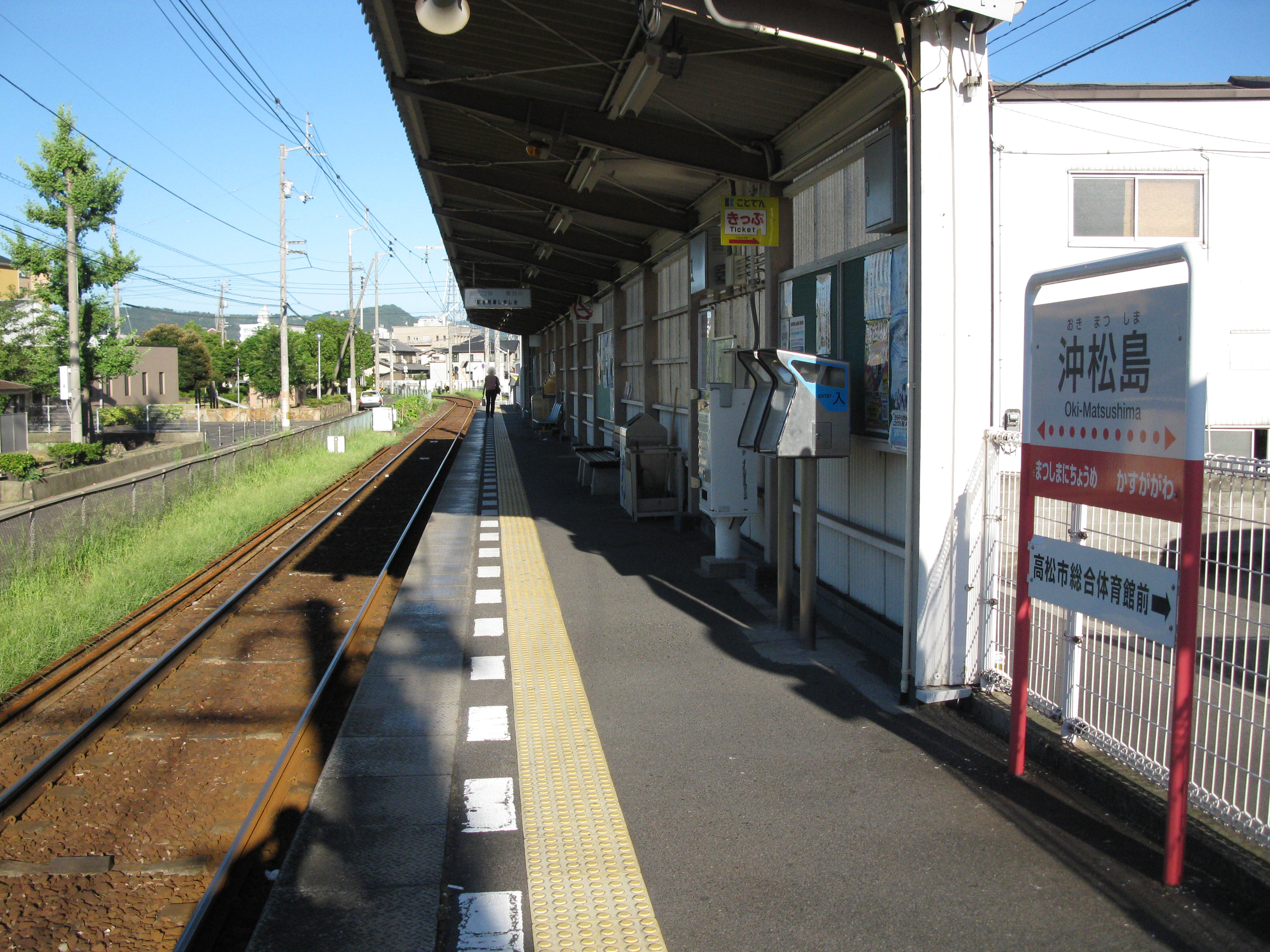
- Oki-Matsushima Station in August 2010

General information
- Location: 4 Chome-33 Fukuokachō, Takamatsu-shi, Kagawa-ken 760-0066; Japan
- Coordinates: 34°20′28.3″N 134°4′21″E
- Operator: Takamatsu-Kotohira Electric Railroad
- Line: ■ Shido Line
- Distance: 1.9 km from Kawaramachi
- Platforms: 1 side platform

Other information
- Status: Unstaffed
- Station code: C03

History
- Opened: 18 November 1911

Passengers
- FY2018: 701 daily
Location
- Location within Kagawa Prefecture Location within Japan

Oki-Matsushima Station (沖松島駅, Oki-Matsushima-eki) is a passenger railway station located in the city of Takamatsu, Kagawa, Japan. It is operated by the private transportation company Takamatsu-Kotohira Electric Railroad (Kotoden) and is designated station "S03".

== Lines ==
Oki-Matsushima Station is a station of the Kotoden Shido Line and is located 1.9 km from the opposing terminus of the line at Kawaramachi Station.

== Layout ==
The station consists of one side platform serving a single bi-directional track. There is no station building and the station is unstaffed.

== Adjacent stations ==
| « | Service | » |
Kotoden Shido Line
| Matsushima-Nichōme | Local | Kasugagawa |

== History ==
Oki-Matsushima Station opened on November 18, 1911 on the Tosan Electric Tramway. On November 1, 1943 it became a station on the Takamatsu-Kotohira Electric Railway.

== Surrounding area ==
- Takamatsu General Gymnasium
- Takamatsu City Fukuokamachi Pool

== See also ==
- List of railway stations in Japan
