= Nakakita =

Nakakita (written: 中北 or 中耒田) is a Japanese surname. Notable people with the surname include:

- Chieko Nakakita (中北千枝子; 1926–2005), Japanese actress
- Kojin Nakakita (中北浩仁; born 1963), Japanese sledge hockey coach
- Nakakita Yuma (中耒田悠真; born 2004), Japanese singer, member of boy group &TEAM
