= Rokumanji Station =

Railway station in Takamatsu, Kagawa Prefecture, Japan

Rokumanji Station 六万寺駅
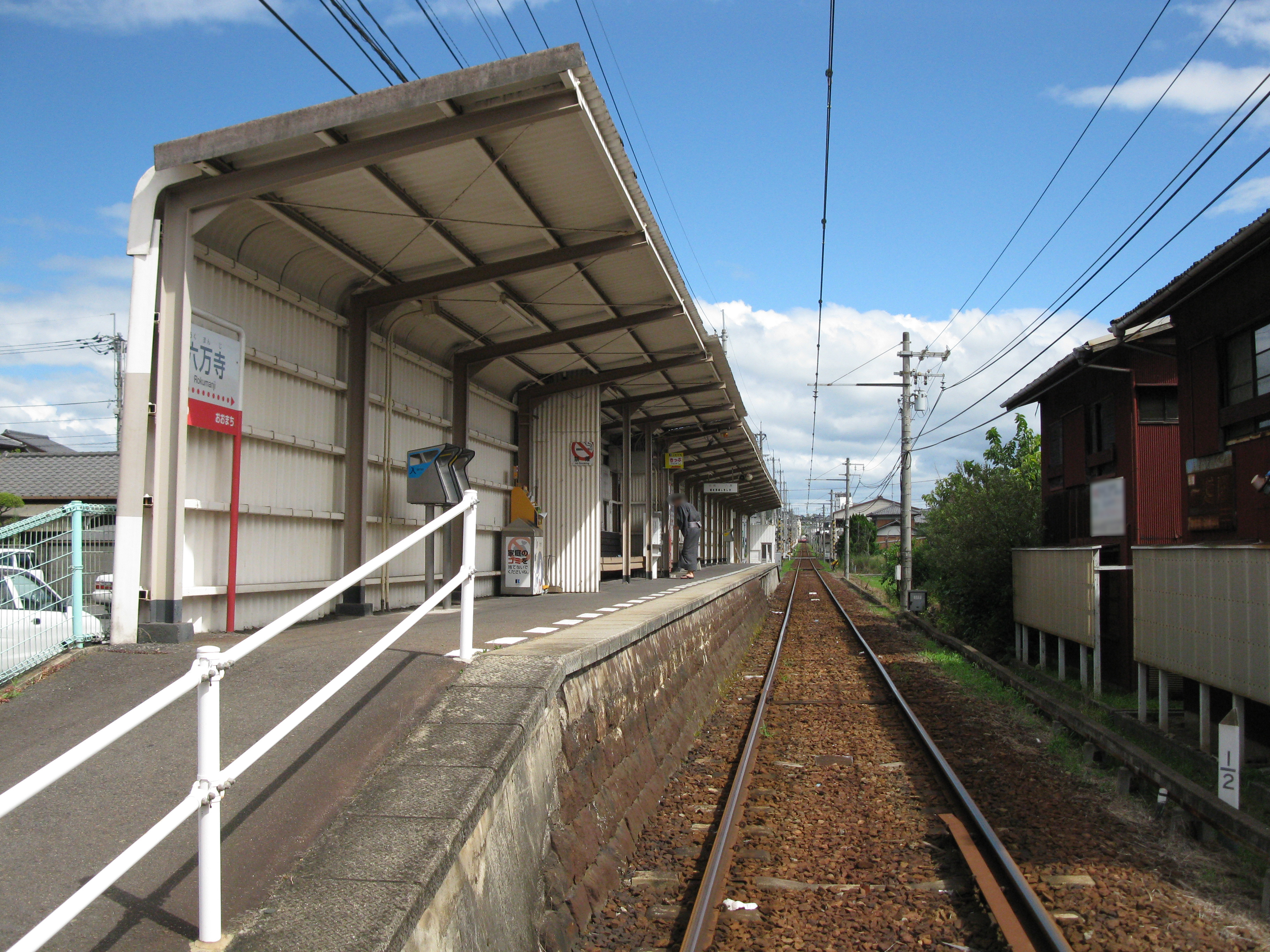
- Rokumanji Station platform

General information
- Location: Murecho Mure, Takamatsu-shi, Kagawa-ken 761-0121; Japan
- Coordinates: 34.3428°N 134.1340°E
- Operator: Takamatsu-Kotohira Electric Railroad
- Line: ■ Shido Line
- Distance: 7.8 km from Kawaramachi
- Platforms: 1 side platform

Construction
- Structure type: At-grade
- Parking: No
- Cycle facilities: Yes
- Accessible: Yes

Other information
- Status: Unstaffed
- Station code: S09

History
- Opened: November 18, 1911
- Former names: Mure (1949-1955)

Passengers
- FY2017: 967 per day
Location
- Location within Kagawa Prefecture Location within Japan

Rokumanji Station (六万寺駅, Rokumanji-eki) is a passenger railway station located in the city of Takamatsu, Kagawa, Japan. It is operated by the private transportation company Takamatsu-Kotohira Electric Railroad (Kotoden) and is designated station "S09".

== Lines ==
Rokumanji Station is a station of the Kotoden Shido Line and is located 7.8 km from the opposing terminus of the line at Kawaramachi Station.

== Layout ==
The station consists of one side platform serving a single bi-directional track. The station is unattended.

== Adjacent stations ==
«	Service	»
Kotoden Shido Line
Yakuri	Local	Ōmachi

== History ==
Rokumanji Station opened on November 18, 1911 on the Tosan Electric Tramway. It became a station of the Sanuki Electric Railway in 1942. On November 1, 1943 it became a station on the Takamatsu-Kotohira Electric Railway. Operations were suspended on January 26, 1945, but were reopened on October 9, 1949 with the station renamed Mure Station (牟礼駅). The name reverted to Rokumanji Station on February 1, 1955.

== Passenger statistics ==
Ridership per day
Year	Ridership
2011	1,057
2012	1,082
2013	1,068
2014	1,018
2015	978
2016	954
2017	967

== Surrounding area ==
- Kagawa Prefectural Takamatsu Kita Junior and Senior High School

== See also ==
- List of railway stations in Japan
