= Shioya Station =

Shioya Station is the name of three train stations in Japan:

- Shioya Station (Hokkaido) (塩谷駅)
- Shioya Station (Hyogo) (塩屋駅)
- Shioya Station (Kagawa) (塩屋駅)
