= Takamatsu =

Takamatsu 高松市
- Prefecture capital and Core city
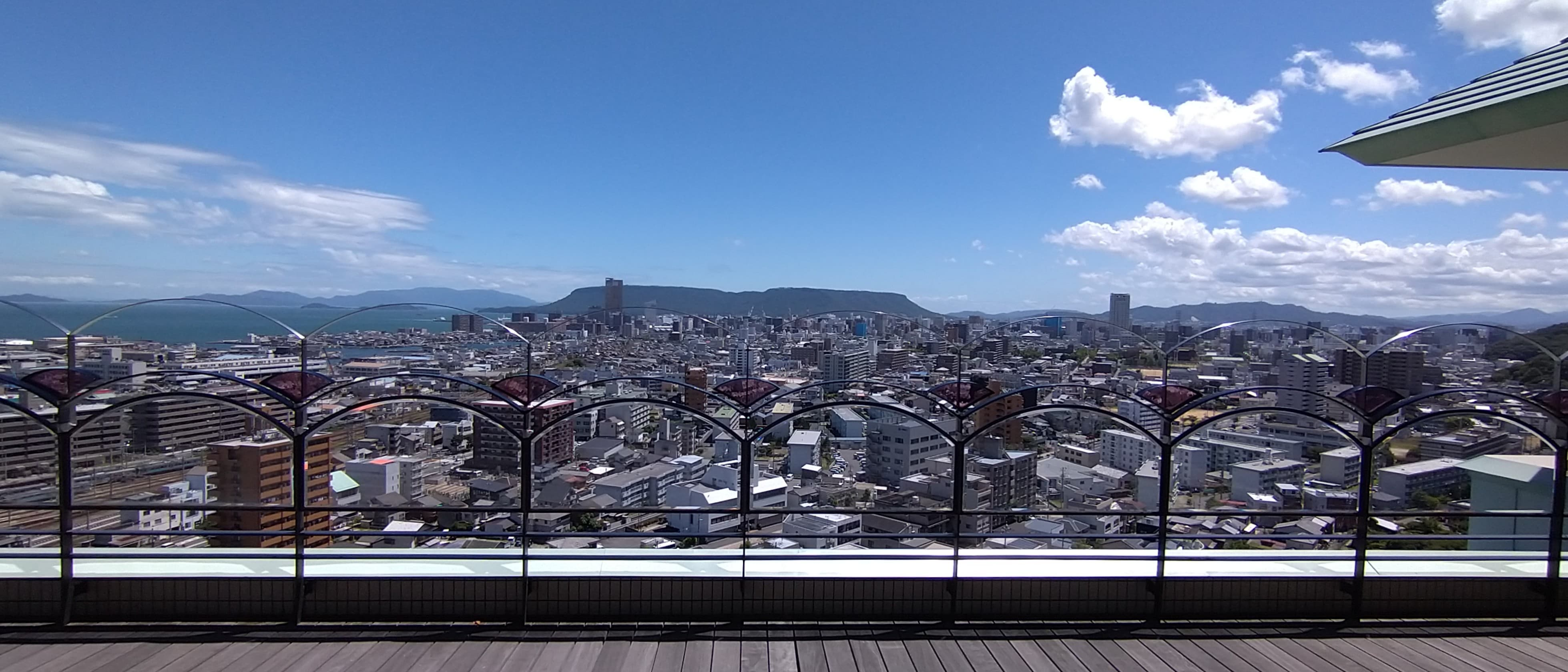
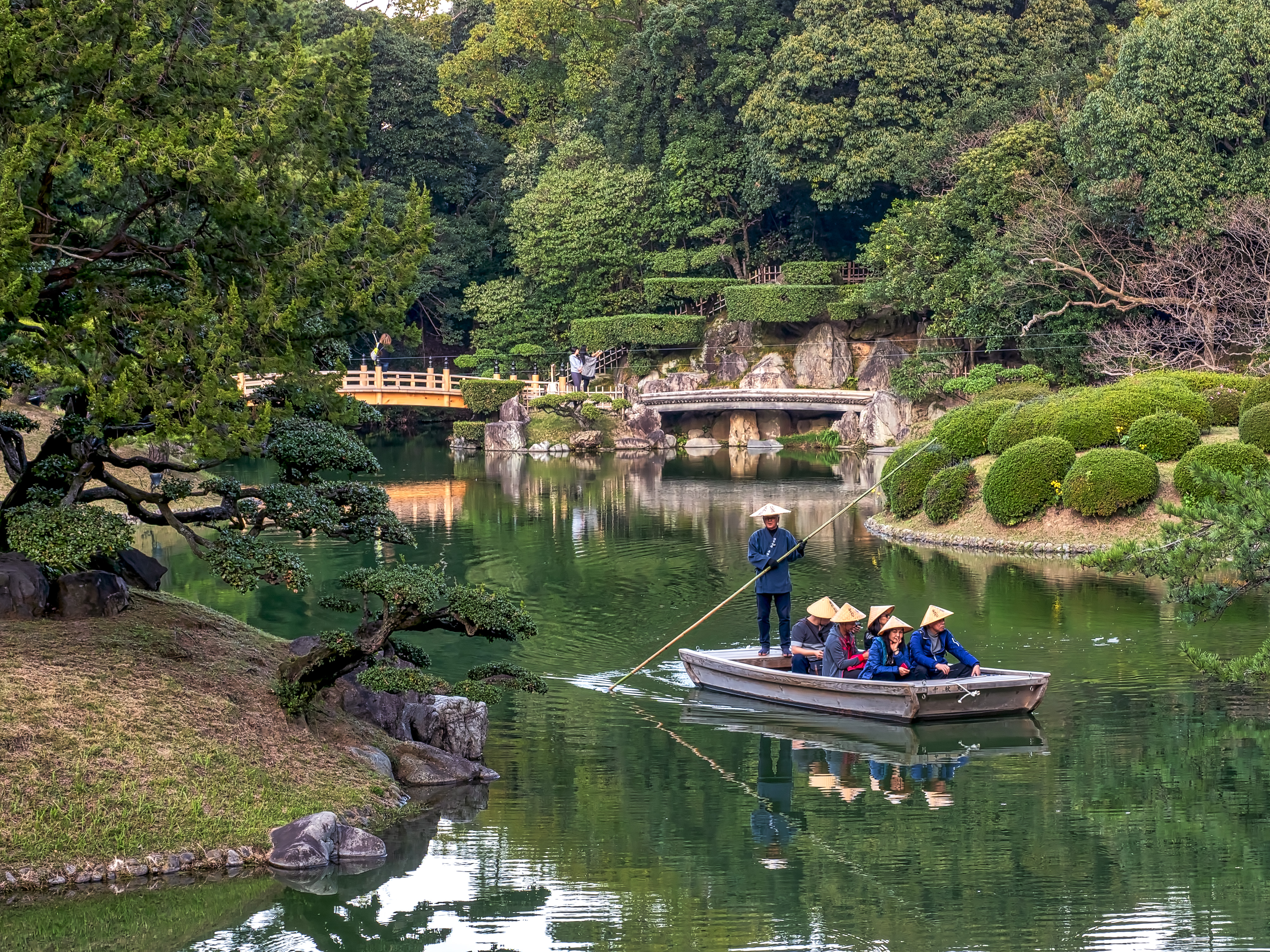
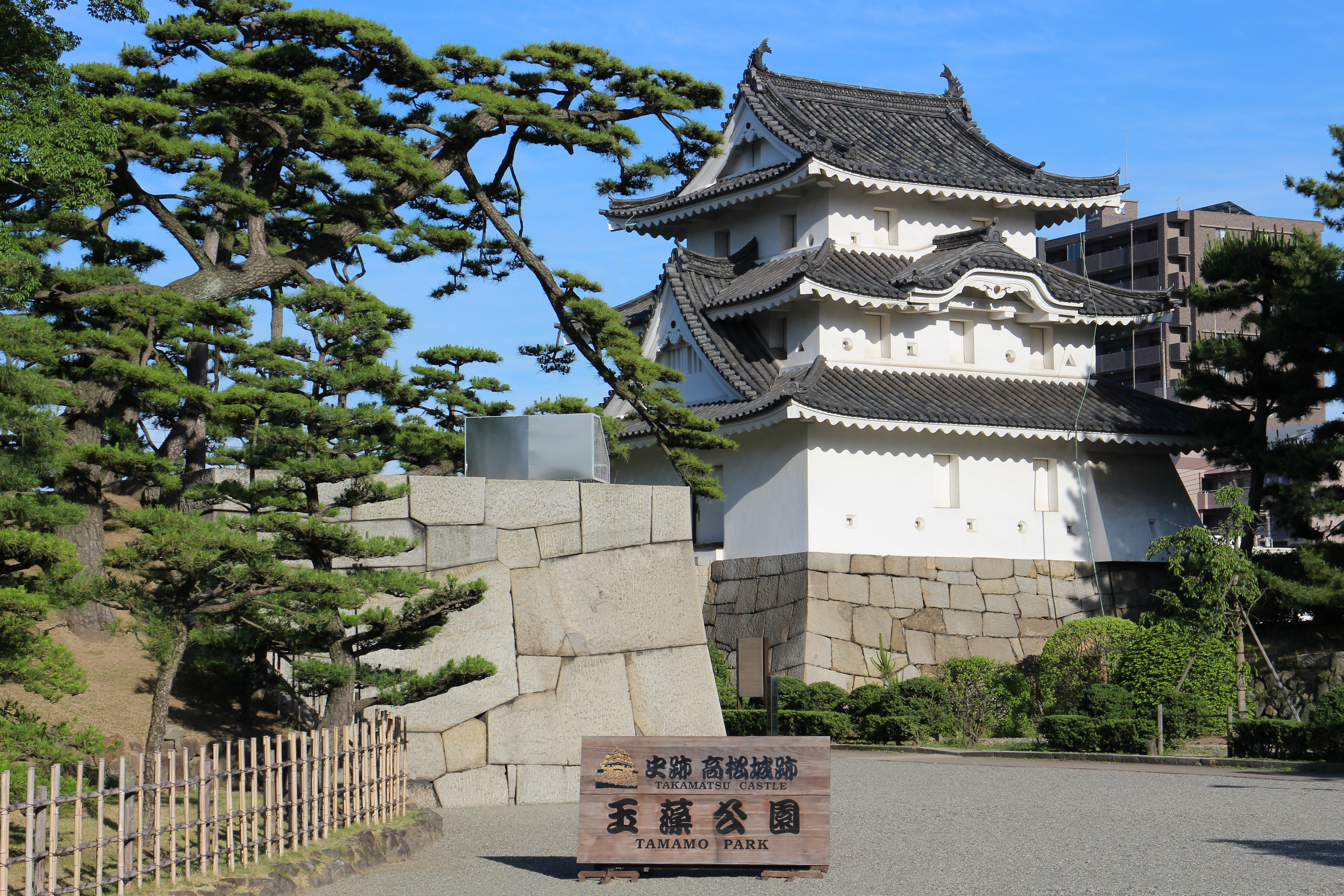
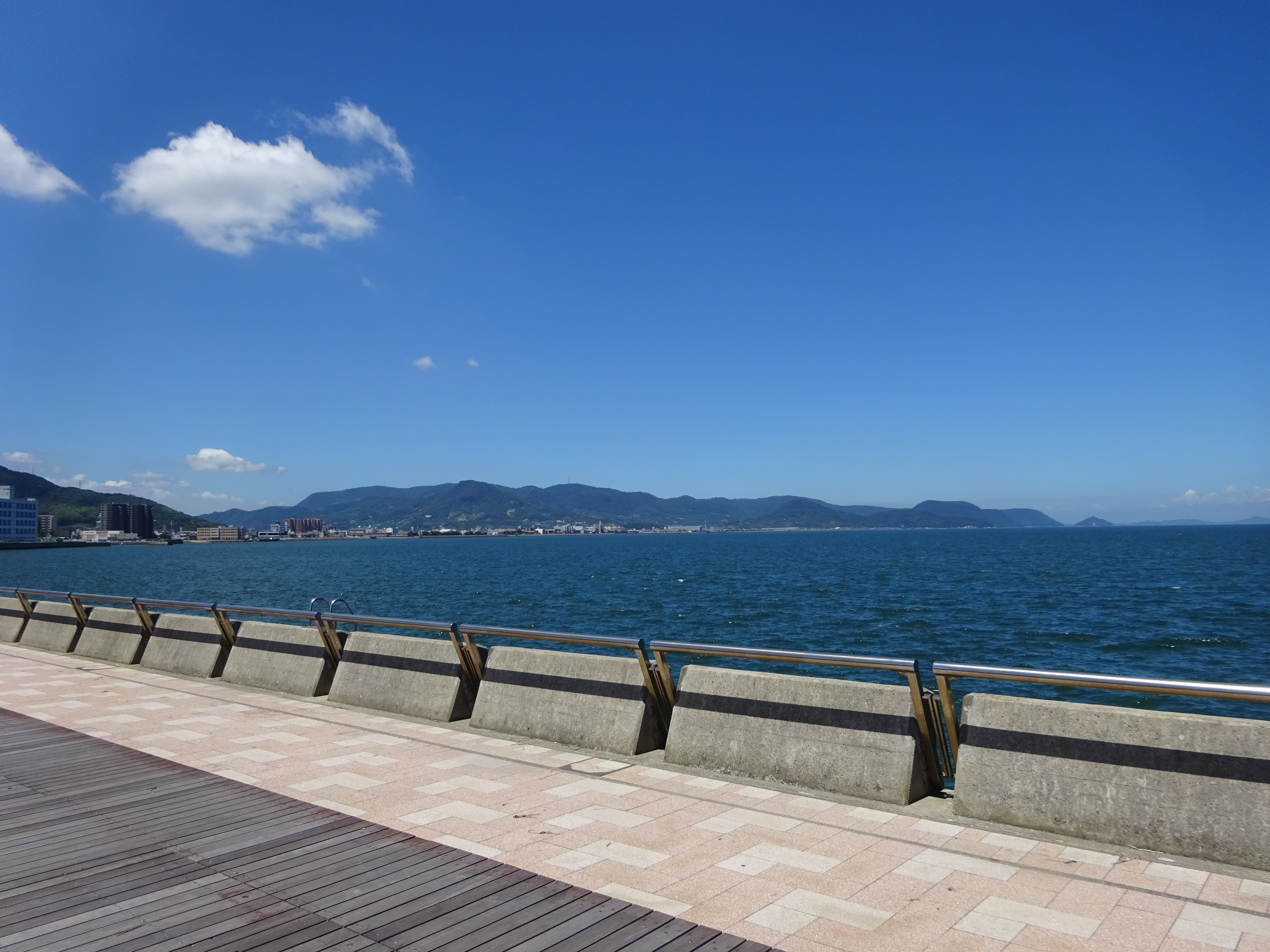
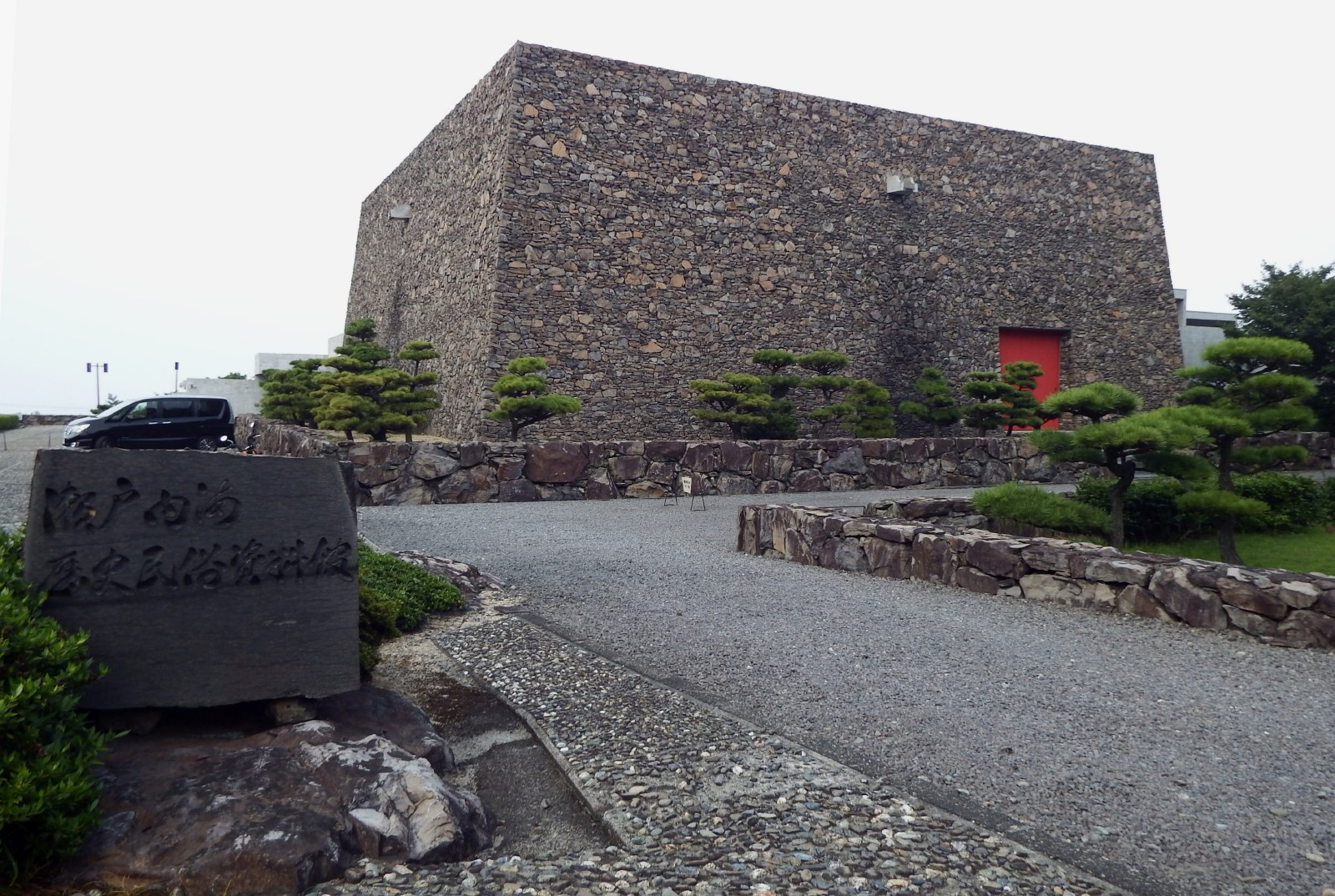
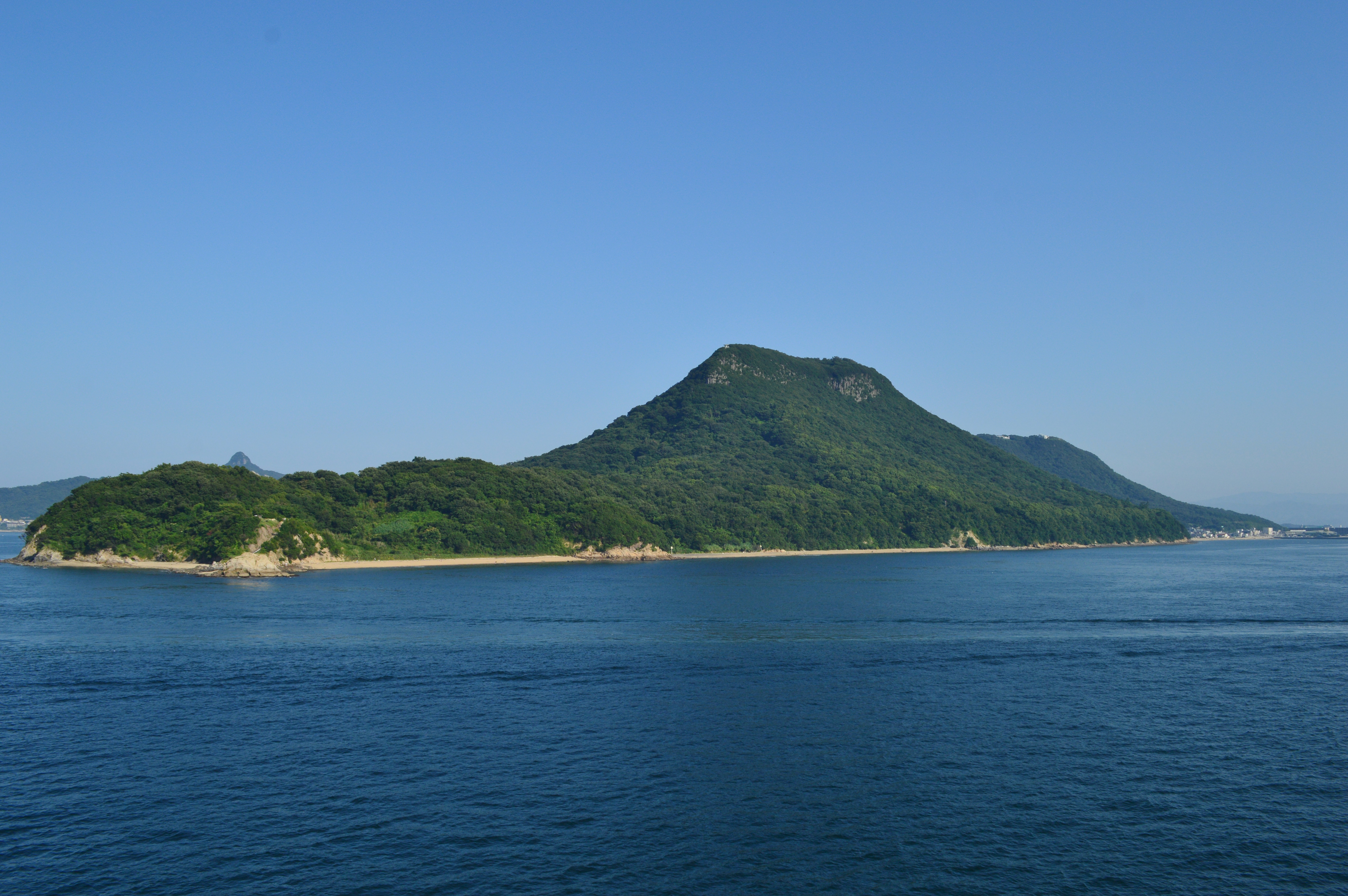
- View of Takamatsu, from Hanajukai (Yashima is in the distance) Ritsurin Garden Takamatsu Castle View of Goshikidai, from Takamatsu Port Seto Island Sea History and Folklore Museum View of Yashima, from Takamatsu city

- Flag Seal
- Location of Takamatsu in Kagawa Prefecture

- Location in Japan
- Coordinates: 34°21′N 134°3′E
- Country: Japan
- Region: Shikoku
- Prefecture: Kagawa

Government
  - Mayor: Hideto Ōnishi

Area
  - Total: 375.41 km^{2} (144.95 sq mi)

Population (November 1, 2022)
  - Total: 414,134
  - Density: 1,103.2/km^{2} (2,857.1/sq mi)
- Time zone: UTC+09:00 (JST)
- City hall address: 1-8-15 Banchō, Takamatsu-shi, Kagawa-ken 760-8571
- Climate: Cfa
- Website: Official website
- Symbols
- Flower: Azalea
- Tree: Pine

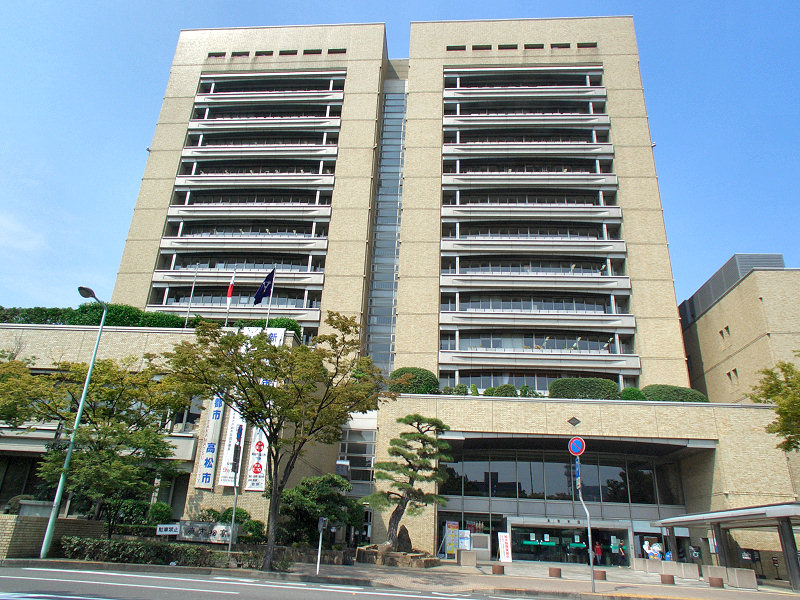
Takamatsu City Hall

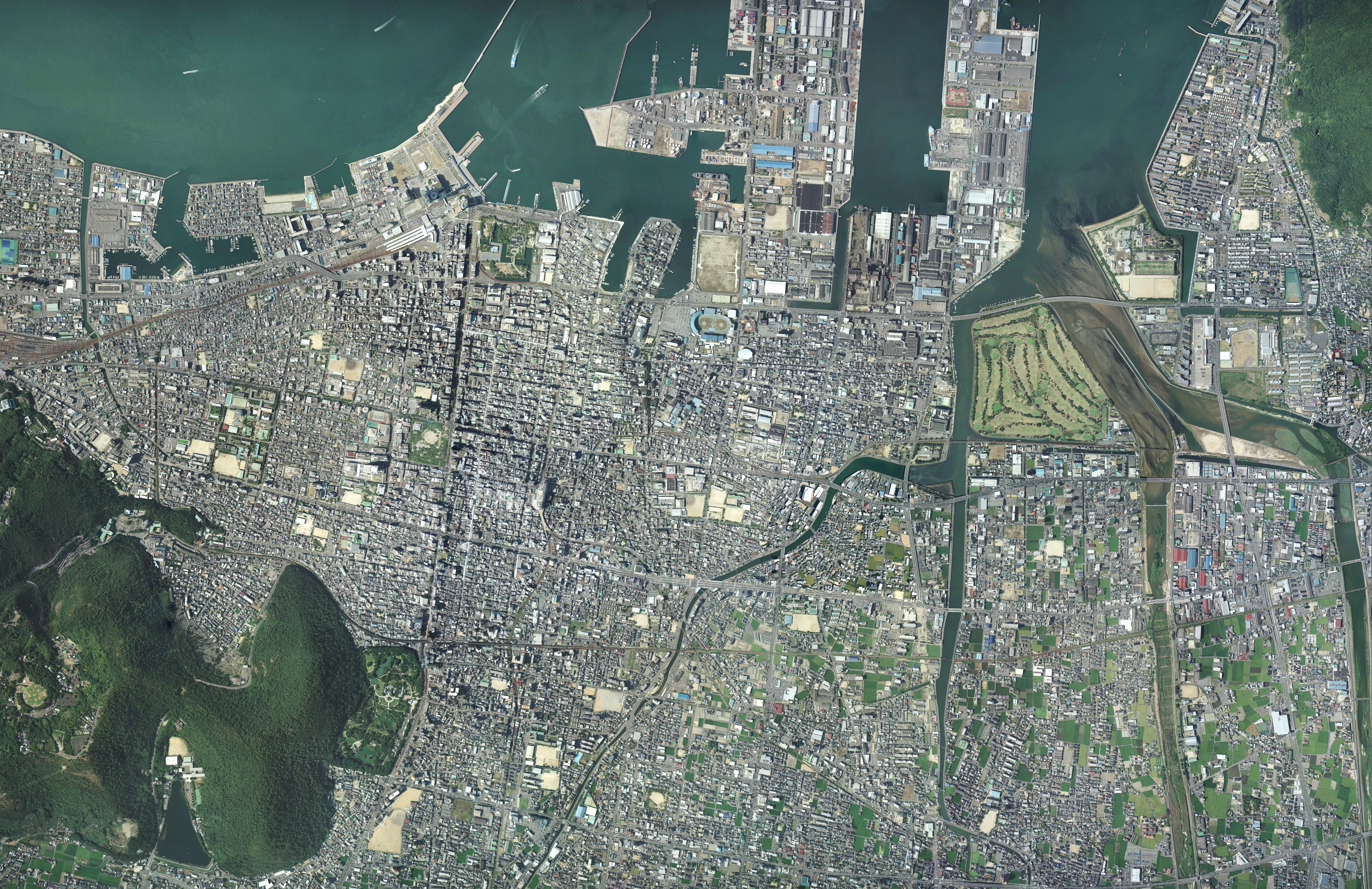
Aerial view of Takamatsu city center

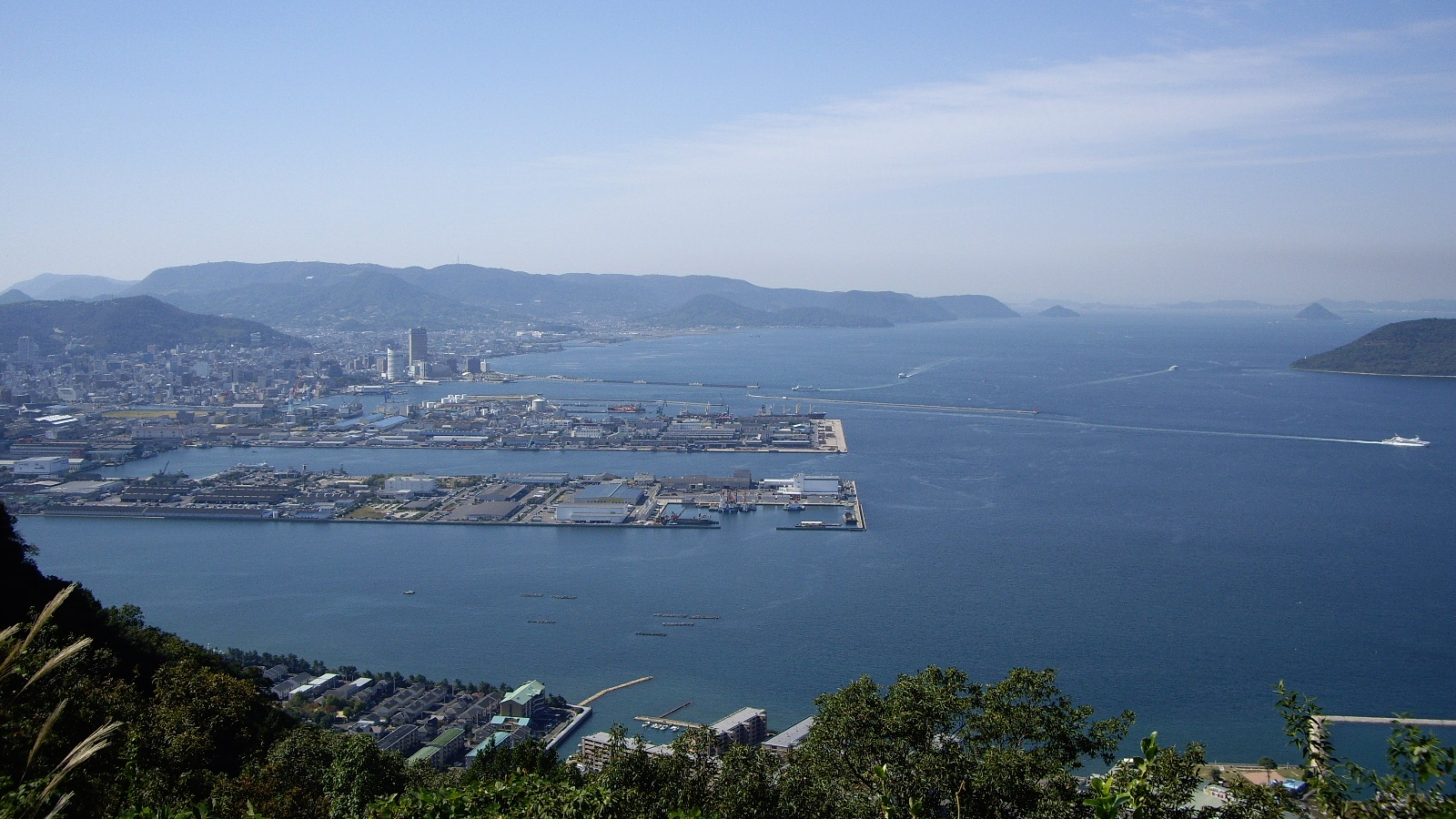
View from Yashima to Takashima port

Takamatsu (高松市, Takamatsu-shi; Japanese pronunciation: [tä̀.kä́.mä̀.t͡sɨ̀, -mä́.t͡sɨ̥.ɕì]) is the capital city of Kagawa Prefecture, Japan. As of 1 November 2022, the city had an estimated population of 414,134 in 190,120 households and a population density of 1,100 persons per km^{2}. The total area of the city is 375.41 square kilometres (144.95 sq mi). It is the capital city of the prefecture.

== Geography ==
Takamatsu is located in central Kagawa Prefecture on the island of Shikoku. The city is located in the Takamatsu Plain, which is part of the Sanuki Plain, and is occupied by a gentle slope as a whole. The northern part faces the Seto Inland Sea, forming a semicircular urban area centered on Takamatsu Port and Takamatsu New Port (commonly known as Shinminato).The western part of the city consists of an alluvial fan formed by the sedimentation of the Koto River. The eastern part is a flooded plain formed by the Kasuga River and Shinkawa River. In the northeastern part of the island, there is Yashima, a table-shaped plateau protruding into the Seto Inland Sea, which was the site of the Battle of Yashima in the Genpei War, and Cape Takei, the northernmost tip of the main island of Shikoku. Parts of the city are located within the borders of the Setonaikai National Park. The city area also includes a number of small inhabited islands in the Seto Inland Sea.

=== Neighbouring municipalities ===
Kagawa Prefecture

- Ayagawa
- Honnō
- Miki
- Sakaide
- Sanuki

Tokushima Prefecture

- Mima

=== Climate ===
Takamatsu has a humid subtropical climate (Köppen climate classification Cfa) with hot, humid summers, and cool winters. Some rain falls throughout the year, but the months from May to September have the heaviest rain.

Climate data for Takamatsu (1991−2020 normals, extremes 1941−present)
Month	Jan	Feb	Mar	Apr	May	Jun	Jul	Aug	Sep	Oct	Nov	Dec	Year
Record high °C (°F)	18.9 (66.0)	24.0 (75.2)	26.2 (79.2)	30.9 (87.6)	32.6 (90.7)	36.5 (97.7)	38.4 (101.1)	38.8 (101.8)	37.6 (99.7)	34.0 (93.2)	26.9 (80.4)	21.2 (70.2)	38.8 (101.8)
Mean maximum °C (°F)	14.7 (58.5)	16.9 (62.4)	21.4 (70.5)	26.8 (80.2)	30.6 (87.1)	33.1 (91.6)	36.0 (96.8)	36.5 (97.7)	34.0 (93.2)	29.0 (84.2)	23.0 (73.4)	17.5 (63.5)	36.8 (98.2)
Mean daily maximum °C (°F)	9.7 (49.5)	10.5 (50.9)	14.1 (57.4)	19.8 (67.6)	24.8 (76.6)	27.5 (81.5)	31.7 (89.1)	33.0 (91.4)	28.8 (83.8)	23.2 (73.8)	17.5 (63.5)	12.1 (53.8)	21.1 (70.0)
Daily mean °C (°F)	5.9 (42.6)	6.3 (43.3)	9.4 (48.9)	14.7 (58.5)	19.8 (67.6)	23.3 (73.9)	27.5 (81.5)	28.6 (83.5)	24.7 (76.5)	19.0 (66.2)	13.2 (55.8)	8.1 (46.6)	16.7 (62.1)
Mean daily minimum °C (°F)	2.1 (35.8)	2.2 (36.0)	5.0 (41.0)	9.9 (49.8)	15.1 (59.2)	19.8 (67.6)	24.1 (75.4)	25.1 (77.2)	21.2 (70.2)	15.1 (59.2)	9.1 (48.4)	4.3 (39.7)	12.8 (55.0)
Mean minimum °C (°F)	−1.8 (28.8)	−1.8 (28.8)	−0.2 (31.6)	3.4 (38.1)	9.7 (49.5)	15.5 (59.9)	20.7 (69.3)	21.6 (70.9)	15.5 (59.9)	9.2 (48.6)	3.4 (38.1)	−0.3 (31.5)	−2.2 (28.0)
Record low °C (°F)	−7.7 (18.1)	−6.0 (21.2)	−4.4 (24.1)	−2.4 (27.7)	2.8 (37.0)	7.5 (45.5)	15.3 (59.5)	15.8 (60.4)	9.4 (48.9)	2.0 (35.6)	−1.8 (28.8)	−5.3 (22.5)	−7.7 (18.1)
Average precipitation mm (inches)	39.4 (1.55)	45.8 (1.80)	81.4 (3.20)	74.6 (2.94)	100.9 (3.97)	153.1 (6.03)	159.8 (6.29)	106.0 (4.17)	167.4 (6.59)	120.1 (4.73)	55.0 (2.17)	46.7 (1.84)	1,150.1 (45.28)
Average snowfall cm (inches)	0 (0)	1 (0.4)	0 (0)	0 (0)	0 (0)	0 (0)	0 (0)	0 (0)	0 (0)	0 (0)	0 (0)	0 (0)	1 (0.4)
Average precipitation days (≥ 0.5 mm)	7.5	8.0	10.8	10.1	9.4	11.5	10.5	7.9	10.5	9.3	7.8	7.9	111.3
Average relative humidity (%)	63	63	62	62	64	72	73	70	72	70	69	66	67
Mean monthly sunshine hours	141.4	143.8	175.0	194.5	210.1	158.2	191.8	221.2	159.6	164.6	145.5	142.7	2,046.5
Source: Japan Meteorological Agency

Climate data for Kōnan, Takamatsu (2003−2020 normals, extremes 2003−present)
Month	Jan	Feb	Mar	Apr	May	Jun	Jul	Aug	Sep	Oct	Nov	Dec	Year
Record high °C (°F)	17.0 (62.6)	23.7 (74.7)	28.6 (83.5)	29.6 (85.3)	31.9 (89.4)	34.8 (94.6)	37.8 (100.0)	37.8 (100.0)	35.6 (96.1)	31.9 (89.4)	26.5 (79.7)	19.4 (66.9)	37.8 (100.0)
Mean daily maximum °C (°F)	8.2 (46.8)	9.3 (48.7)	13.1 (55.6)	18.8 (65.8)	23.7 (74.7)	26.4 (79.5)	30.2 (86.4)	31.7 (89.1)	27.5 (81.5)	21.9 (71.4)	16.3 (61.3)	10.5 (50.9)	19.8 (67.6)
Daily mean °C (°F)	4.1 (39.4)	4.9 (40.8)	8.0 (46.4)	13.3 (55.9)	18.3 (64.9)	21.8 (71.2)	25.6 (78.1)	26.7 (80.1)	22.8 (73.0)	17.3 (63.1)	11.8 (53.2)	6.5 (43.7)	15.1 (59.2)
Mean daily minimum °C (°F)	0.4 (32.7)	0.7 (33.3)	3.0 (37.4)	7.9 (46.2)	13.0 (55.4)	17.7 (63.9)	22.0 (71.6)	22.8 (73.0)	19.1 (66.4)	13.3 (55.9)	7.7 (45.9)	2.7 (36.9)	10.9 (51.5)
Record low °C (°F)	−5.6 (21.9)	−5.5 (22.1)	−3.6 (25.5)	−1.1 (30.0)	2.9 (37.2)	9.7 (49.5)	16.3 (61.3)	15.9 (60.6)	11.0 (51.8)	4.6 (40.3)	−0.4 (31.3)	−4.9 (23.2)	−5.6 (21.9)
Average precipitation mm (inches)	41.0 (1.61)	54.8 (2.16)	84.8 (3.34)	77.8 (3.06)	105.5 (4.15)	160.7 (6.33)	193.2 (7.61)	150.1 (5.91)	214.4 (8.44)	148.4 (5.84)	64.4 (2.54)	59.0 (2.32)	1,353.9 (53.30)
Average precipitation days (≥ 1.0 mm)	6.6	8.4	10.1	9.8	8.3	11.1	10.5	8.7	10.2	8.5	8.0	7.9	108.1
Source: Japan Meteorological Agency

== Demographics ==
Per Japanese census data, the population of Takamatsu in 2020 is 417,496 people. Takamatsu has been conducting censuses since 1920.

Historical population
Year	Pop.	±%
1920	186,963	—
1925	199,141	+6.5%
1930	213,001	+7.0%
1935	222,545	+4.5%
1940	219,082	−1.6%
1945	246,809	+12.7%
1950	269,159	+9.1%
1955	284,684	+5.8%
1960	295,178	+3.7%
1965	307,549	+4.2%
1970	327,170	+6.4%
1975	360,024	+10.0%
1980	386,547	+7.4%
1985	401,020	+3.7%
1990	406,853	+1.5%
1995	412,626	+1.4%
2000	416,680	+1.0%
2005	418,125	+0.3%
2010	419,429	+0.3%
2015	420,748	+0.3%
2020	417,496	−0.8%
Takamatsu population statistics

== History ==
The area of Takamatsu was part of ancient Sanuki Province. During the Heian and Kamakura period, as the closest port to Honshu from Shikoku island, the area was a transportation center and gateway for pilgrims to the Kotohira Shrine. During the Sengoku period, Ikoma Chikamasa built the first Takamatsu Castle in 1588. In 1642, Matsudaira Yorishige, the son of Tokugawa Yorifusa of Mito Domain and grandson of Tokugawa Ieyasu, was awarded the 120,000 koku Takamatsu Domain, which his descendants would continue to rule until the Meiji restoration.

Following the Meiji restoration, the city of Takamatsu was created with the establishment of the modern municipalities system on February 15, 1890. The castle tower formerly used as the symbol of the city was destroyed during the Meiji period. The city borders expanded in several iterations by the annexation on neighboring villages and towns. During World War II, Takamatsu was selected as a target by the United States' XXI Bomber Command because the city was an important focal point of Shikoku's rail and road transit systems, and containing some industry vital to supporting the war effort. On July 3, 1945, at 6:40 pm (JST) 128 B-29 Superfortress bombers dropped over 800 tons of incendiary bombs on Takamatsu, destroying 78% of the built-up areas of the city and killing 1359 people.

The city quickly recovered after the war, and its borders continued to expand. On April 1, 1999, it was designated a core city with increased local autonomy.

On September 26, 2005, the town of Shionoe (from Kagawa District) was merged into Takamatsu. On January 10, 2006, Takamatsu absorbed the following towns: Aji and Mure (from Kita District), Kagawa and Kōnan (from Kagawa District), and Kokubunji (from Ayauta District).

== Government ==
Takamatsu has a mayor-council form of government with a directly elected mayor and a unicameral city council of 40 members. Takamatsu contributes 15 members to the Kagawa Prefectural Assembly. In terms of national politics, the city is divided between Kagawa 1st district and Kagawa 2nd district of the lower house of the Diet of Japan.

=== Crime and safety ===
The Shinwa-kai yakuza syndicate is based in Takamatsu. The Shinwa-kai is the only designated yakuza group based in the Shikoku region.

In October 2017, Japan Today reported five people received minor injuries when a wild boar entered a local Aeon mall.

== Economy ==
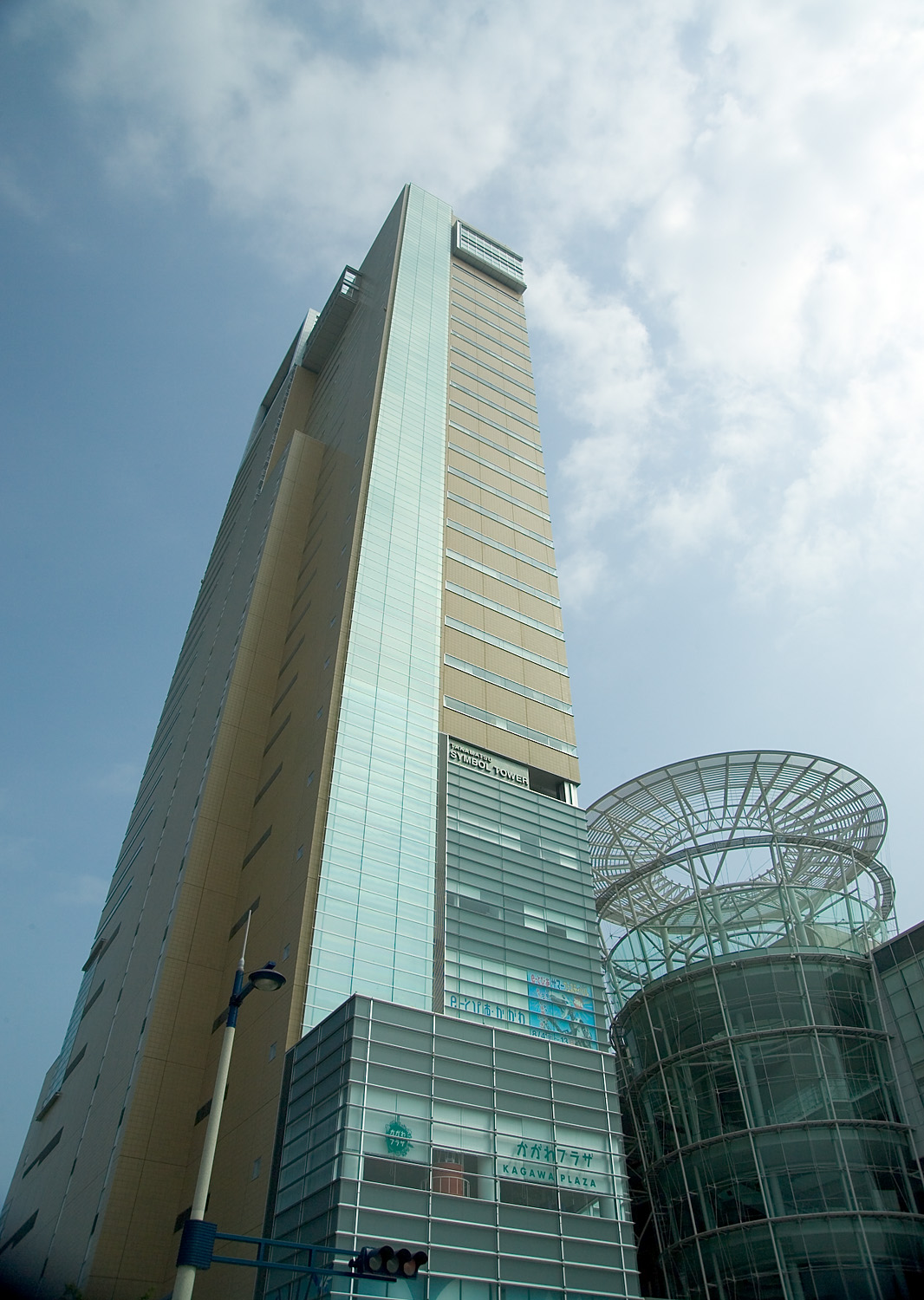
Symbol Tower

Takamatsu is the largest municipality in Shikoku and is a city with a large concentration of nationwide companies' branch offices, which play a large role in its economy. It also contains most of the national government's branch offices for Shikoku. In 2004, construction of the Symbol Tower, the new symbol of Takamatsu, was completed. The Symbol Tower is in the Sunport area of the city. The Symbol Tower is the tallest building in Takamatsu, and is right next to another tall building The JR Clement Hotel (formerly the ANA Clement Hotel), which is also part of the Sunport complex. Sunport Takamatsu is also connected to the ports of Takamatsu.

Companies headquartered in the city include:

- Shikoku Railway Company
- Shikoku Shimbun
- Tadano

== Education ==
Takamatsu has 48 public elementary schools, 22 public middle schools and one public high school operated by the city government. The city has eight public high schools and one combined middle/high school operated by the Kagawa Prefectural Board of Education. There are also two private combined middle/high schools, seven private high schools and one national elementary, one national middle and one national high school. The Kagawa Prefectural government also operates three special education schools for the handicapped.

=== Universities ===
- Kagawa Prefectural College of Health Sciences
- Kagawa University
- Takamatsu University

== Transportation ==
The main train station is Takamatsu Station, operated by JR Shikoku. Trains from here run to destinations around Shikoku, as well as Okayama Station on Honshū via the Seto-Ōhashi Bridge. The private Kotoden railway connects much of Takamatsu, with a hub and department store at Kawaramachi Station, and Takamatsu-Chikko Station nearby Takamatsu Station. Buses and trains operated by Kotoden accept a contactless payment card for travel called an IruCa.

=== Airports ===
- Takamatsu Airport

=== Railways ===
Shikoku Railway Company - Yosan Line

- Takamatsu - Kōzai - Kinashi - Hashioka - Kokubu

Shikoku Railway Company - Kōtoku Line

- Sanuki-Mure - Yakuriguchi - Furutakamatsu-Minami - Yashima - Kitachō - Ritsurin - Ritsurin-Kōen-Kitaguchi - Shōwachō - Takamatsu

Takamatsu-Kotohira Electric Railroad - Kotoden Kotohira Line

- Takamatsu-Chikkō- Kataharamachi - Kawaramachi - Ritsurin-Kōen - Sanjō - Fuseishi - Ōta - Busshōzan - Kūkō-dōri - Ichinomiya - Enza - Okamoto

Takamatsu-Kotohira Electric Railroad - Kotoden Nagao Line

- (Takamatsu-Chikkō - Kataharamachi) - Kawaramachi - Hanazono - Hayashimichi - Kita-Higashiguchi - Motoyama - Mizuta - Nishi-Maeda -Takata

Takamatsu-Kotohira Electric Railroad - Kotoden Shido Line

- Kawaramachi - Imabashi - Matsushima-Nichōme - Oki-Matsushima - Kasugagawa - Katamoto - Kotoden-Yashima - Furu-Takamatsu - Yakuri - Rokumanji - Ōmachi - Yakuri-Shinmichi - Shioya - Fusazaki - Hara

=== Highways ===
- Takamatsu Expressway
- National Route 11
- National Route 30
- National Route 32
- National Route 193
- National Route 377
- National Route 436
- National Route 492

=== Ports ===
- Port of Takamatsu

== Local attractions ==
- Ritsurin Garden, a Japanese garden designated as a Special Place of Scenic Beauty by the Japanese government
- Takamatsu Castle is known for using seawater in its moat and recently the old keep of the castle was successfully restored and opened for public viewing.
- Yashima plateau which is home to various sightseeing spots. At the base of the mountain is the open air museum Shikoku Mura where aspects of regional history and culture are exhibited. On the mountain itself is Yashima-ji, number 84 of the Shikoku pilgrimage. At the top of the mountain there is also an observation deck which offers views across the Seto Inland Sea.
- Takamatsu also acts as a hub to access various islands of the Seto Inland Sea. These include, Megijima, Ogijima, Naoshima, Teshima and Shōdoshima. Since 2010, Takamatsu, along with these islands and more, has been host to the Setouchi Triennale, a contemporary art festival with many outdoor exhibitions by prominent artists from across the world.

=== Sports teams ===
- Kagawa Five Arrows (Basketball, B.League)
- Kagawa Ice Fellows (Ice Hockey)
- Kagawa Olive Guyners (Baseball)
- Kamatamare Sanuki (Football)

== International relations ==
=== Twin towns – sister cities ===
Takamatsu is twinned with:

- St. Petersburg, United States
- Tours, France

=== Friendship cities ===
Takamatsu has friendship arrangements with:

- Nanchang, China, since 1990

== In literature ==
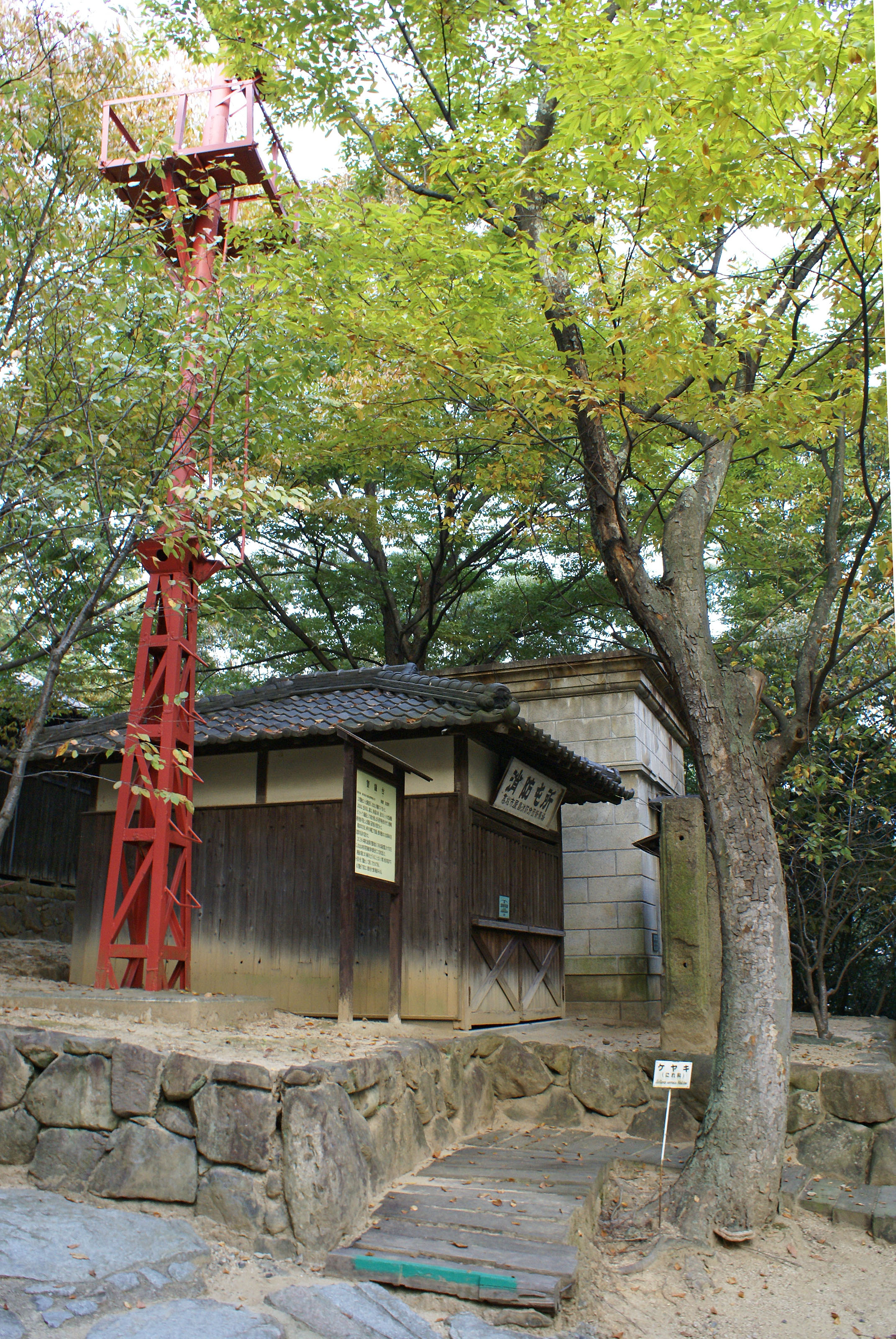
Shikoku Mura

- Takamatsu is the main setting for Haruki Murakami's novel Kafka on the Shore.
- The naval commander Tameichi Hara, born in Takamatsu in 1900, recounts his childhood there in the memoir Japanese Destroyer Captain.
- Takamatsu is the main setting for the manga and anime Poco's Udon World.

== Media ==
- Newspaper: The Shikoku Shimbun
- Television: Setonaikai Broadcasting

== Notable people from Takamatsu ==
The following politicians, celebrities, and other well-known people are from Takamatsu (listed alphabetically by surname):

- Ema Fujisawa (actor, born 1982)
- Ken Fukura (YouTube and producer, born 1993)
- Shinichiro Furumoto (politician, born 1956)
- Yoshihiro Hamaguchi (Olympic athlete, 1926–2011)
- Tameichi Hara (Imperial Japanese naval commander, born 1900)
- Takuya Hirai (politician, born 1958)
- Ikuko Kawai (musician and composer, born 1968)
- Kan Kikuchi (writer and publisher, 1888–1948)
- Akiko Kinouchi (actor, born 1981)
- Makoto Kitano (soccer player, born 1967)
- Kenji Kobayashi (shogi player, born 1957)
- Akihito Kondo (baseball player, 1938–2019)
- Yasuhiro Konishi (karateka, 1893–1983)
- Bukichi Miki (politician, 1884–1956)
- Ryuki Miki (tennis player, 1904–1967)
- Lu Wanyao (golfer, born 1996)
- Yoshiro Maeda (mixed martial artist, born 1981)
- Shigeru Makino (baseball player, 1928–1984)
- Ryuya Matsumoto (baseball player, born 1994)
- Kojin Nakakita (sledge hockey coach, born 1963)
- Futoshi Nakanishi (baseball player, born 1933)
- Kiyotaka Nanbara (comedian and TV personality, born 1965)
- Ayano Ninomiya (violinist, born 1971)
- Tetsuya Noguchi (artist, born 1980)
- Junya Ogawa (politician, born 1971)
- Kentaro Sonoura (politician, born 1972)
- Mikuru Suzuki (darts player, born 1982)
- Midori Tatematsu (musician, born 1988)
- Daisuke Tsuda (singer and drummer, born 1977)
- Ayako Uehara (pianist, born 1980)
- Emiko Uematsu (politician, born 1967)
- Satoru Uyama (fencer, born 1991)

== See also ==
- Busshozan
- Yashima, Kagawa
