= Kotoden 2000 series =

Japanese electric multiple unit train type

- A 2000 series set in October 2026
- Manufacturer: J-TREC
- Built at: Yokohama
- Family name: Sustina
- Replaced: 1070 series
- Constructed: 2026
- Entered service: 1 October 2026
- Number built: 4 vehicles (2 sets)
- Number in service: 4 vehicles (2 sets)
- Formation: 2 cars per trainset
- Operator: Takamatsu-Kotohira Electric Railroad
- Lines served: ■ Kotohira Line; ■ Nagao Line

Specifications
- Car body construction: Stainless steel
- Car length: 18 m (59 ft)
- Doors: 3 pairs per side

The Kotoden 2000 series (Japanese: ことでん2000形) is an electric multiple unit (EMU) train type operated by the railway operator Takamatsu-Kotohira Electric Railroad (Kotoden) in Japan since 2026.

== Background ==
The 2000 series marks Kotoden's first newly built train type in nearly seven decades. Kotoden historically acquired trains from major operators including Keikyu, Keio Corporation, and the Nagoya City Transportation Bureau.

== Design ==
The 2000 series is based on J-TREC's "Sustina S13" stainless steel railcar platform. Cars are 18 metres (59 ft) long and have three pairs of doors per side.

Interior

Wheelchair space

Onboard information display

Driver's cab

Line and destination display

== History ==
Details of the 2000 series were first unveiled in December 2024. Kotoden also announced that it would hold a public poll on three potential design schemes for the new trains; the schemes were named "Dynamic", "Fresh", and "Stylish". In March 2025, the operator announced the "Fresh" design scheme received the most votes (3,444 out of 7,541).

2000 series set being arranged at Busshozan in July 2026

The first two 2000 series sets, 2001 and 2003, were delivered from the J-TREC plant in Yokohama in June 2026. The fleet entered revenue service on the Nagao and Kotohira lines on 1 October 2026. The new trains are planned to replace the 1070 series.
