= Kotoden Shido Line =

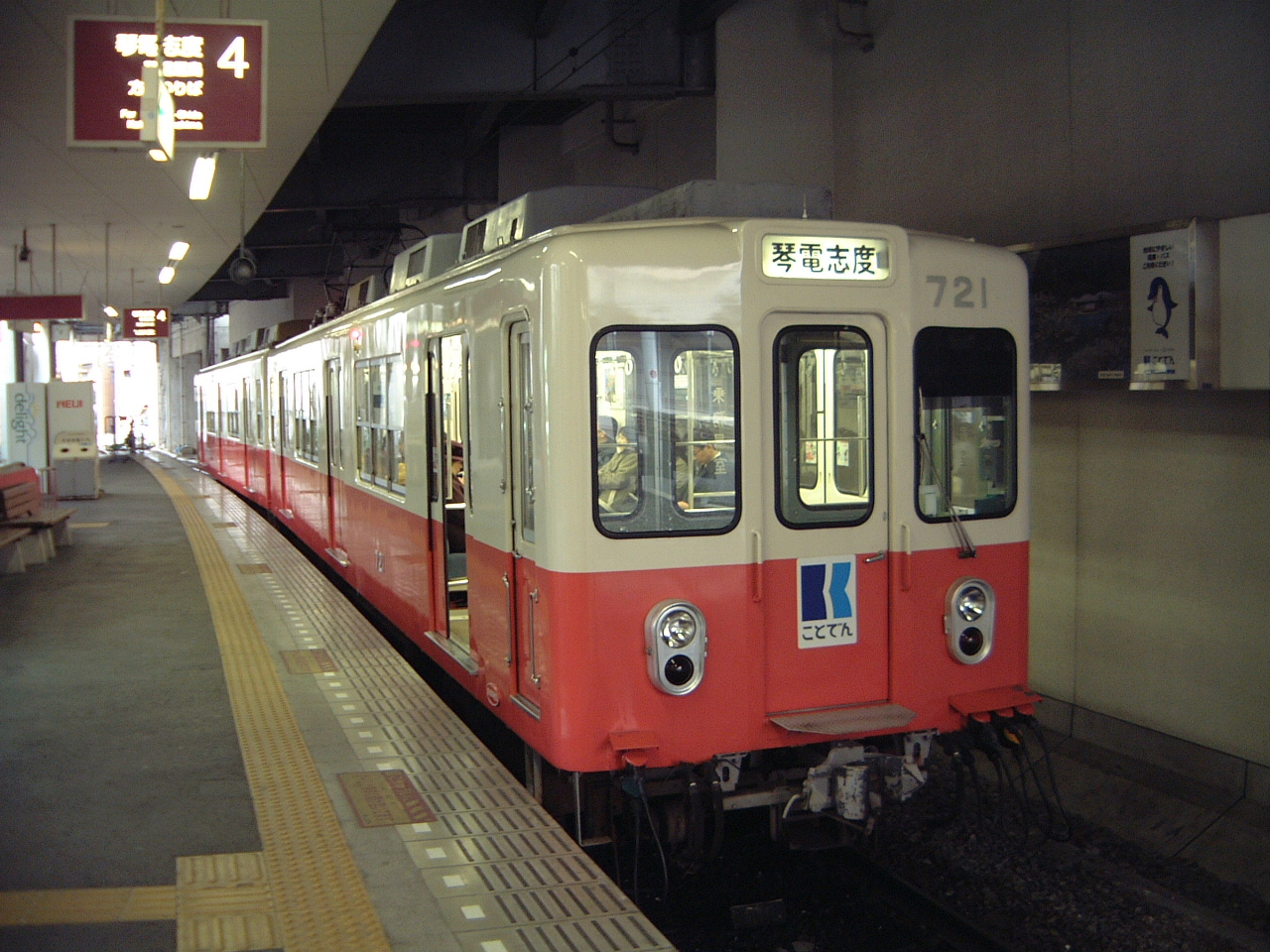
- Kotoden Shido Line 700 series EMU at Kawaramachi Station, January 2006

Overview
- Owner: Takamatsu-Kotohira Electric Railroad
- Locale: Kagawa Prefecture
- Termini: Kawaramachi; Kotoden-Shido
- Stations: 16

History
- Opened: 18 November 1911; 114 years ago

Technical
- Line length: 12.5 km (7.8 mi)
- Num of tracks: Single
- Track gauge: 1,435 mm (4 ft 8 1/2 in)
- Minimum radius: 80 m
- Electrification: 1,500 V DC, overhead catenary
- Operating speed: 65 km/h (40 mph)

The Kotoden Shido Line (琴電志度線, Kotoden Shido-sen) is a Japanese railway line in Kagawa Prefecture, which connects Kawaramachi Station in Takamatsu with Kotoden-Shido Station in Sanuki. It is owned and operated by the Takamatsu-Kotohira Electric Railroad. The line color is rose pink.

== Station list ==
All stations are located in Kagawa Prefecture.

No.	Name	Japanese	Distance (km)		Connections	Location
No.	Name	Japanese	between stations	from Kawaramachi	Connections	Location
S00	Kawaramachi	瓦町	-	0.0	■ Kotoden Kotohira Line (K02) ■ Kotoden Nagao Line (N02)	Takamatsu
S01	Imabashi	今橋	0.6	0.6		Takamatsu
S02	Matsushima-nichome	松島二丁目	0.6	1.2		Takamatsu
S03	Oki-Matsushima	沖松島	0.7	1.9		Takamatsu
S04	Kasugagawa	春日川	1.1	3.0		Takamatsu
S05	Katamoto	潟元	1.3	4.3		Takamatsu
S06	Kotoden-Yashima	琴電屋島	0.7	5.0		Takamatsu
S07	Furu-Takamatsu	古高松	0.7	5.7		Takamatsu
S08	Yakuri	八栗	1.0	6.7	Yakuri Cable (Yakuri-Tozanguchi Station)	Takamatsu
S09	Rokumanji	六万寺	1.1	7.8		Takamatsu
S10	Ōmachi	大町	0.9	8.7		Takamatsu
S11	Yakuri-Shinmichi	八栗新道	0.6	9.3	Kōtoku Line (Sanuki-Mure Station)	Takamatsu
S12	Shioya	塩屋	0.7	10.0		Takamatsu
S13	Fusazaki	房前	0.6	10.6		Takamatsu
S14	Hara	原	0.9	11.5		Takamatsu
S15	Kotoden-Shido	琴電志度	1.0	12.5	Kōtoku Line (Shido Station)	Sanuki

== History ==
The line first opened on 18 November 1911 between Imabashi and Shido Station (now Kotoden-Shido), electrified at 600 V DC. The line voltage was increased to 1,500 V DC from August 1966.
