= Shioya Station (Kagawa) =

Railway station in Takamatsu, Kagawa Prefecture, Japan

Shioya Station 塩屋駅
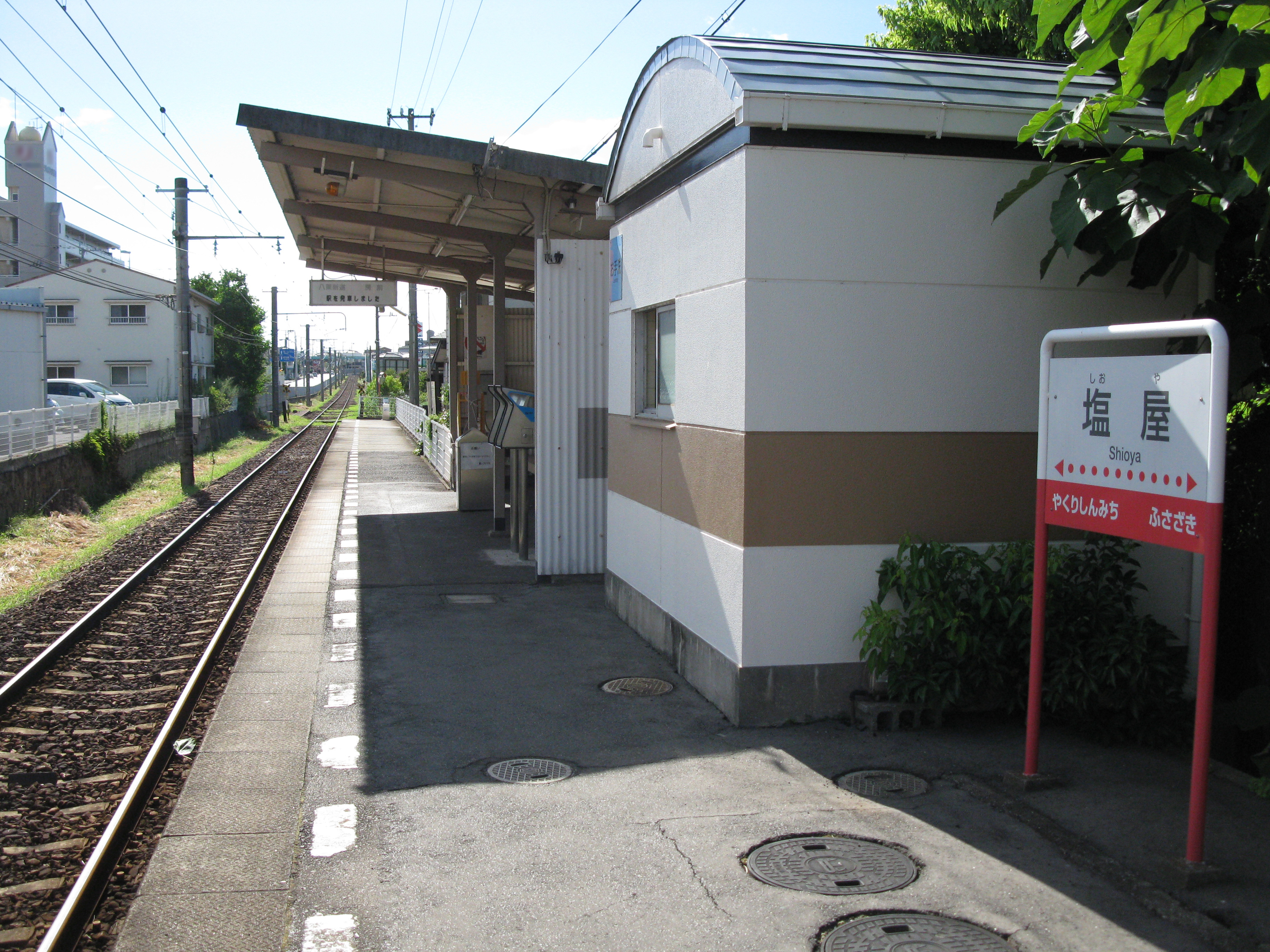
- Shioya Station platform

General information
- Location: Murecho Omachi, Takamatsu-shi, Kagawa-ken 761-0122; Japan
- Coordinates: 34.3356°N 134.1554°E
- Operator: Takamatsu-Kotohira Electric Railroad
- Line: ■ Shido Line
- Distance: 10.0 km from Kawaramachi
- Platforms: 1 side platform

Construction
- Structure type: At-grade
- Parking: No
- Cycle facilities: Yes
- Accessible: Yes

Other information
- Status: Unstaffed
- Station code: S12

History
- Opened: November 18, 1911

Passengers
- FY2017: 141 per day
Location
- Location within Kagawa Prefecture Location within Japan

Shioya Station (塩屋駅, Shioya-eki) is a passenger railway station located in the city of Takamatsu, Kagawa, Japan. It is operated by the private transportation company Takamatsu-Kotohira Electric Railroad (Kotoden) and is designated station "S12".

== Lines ==
Shioya Station is a station of the Kotoden Shido Line and is located 10.0 km from the opposing terminus of the line at Kawaramachi Station.

== Layout ==
The station consists of one side platform serving a single bi-directional track. The station is unattended.

== Adjacent stations ==
«	Service	»
Kotoden Shido Line
Yakuri-Shinmichi	Local	Fusazaki

== History ==
Shioya Station opened on November 18, 1911 on the Tosan Electric Tramway. It became a station of the Sanuki Electric Railway in 1942. On November 1, 1943 it became a station on the Takamatsu-Kotohira Electric Railway. Operations were suspended on January 26, 1945 from Yakuri Station to this station, but were reopened on October 9, 1949.

== Passenger statistics ==
Ridership per day
Year	Ridership
2011	114
2012	114
2013	125
2014	125
2015	139
2016	143
2017	141

== Surrounding area ==
- George Nakashima Memorial Hall
- Takamatsu City Mure Minami Elementary School
- Japan National Route 11

== See also ==
- List of railway stations in Japan
