= Hideto Ōnishi =

Japanese politician

- 大西 秀人

Mayor of Takamatsu
- Incumbent
- Assumed office 2 May 2007
- Preceded by: Shozo Masuda

Personal details
- Born: 23 August 1959 (age 67) Marugame, Kagawa, Japan
- Party: Independent
- Education: University of Tokyo
- Website: www.oi-hideto.com

Hideto Ōnishi (大西 秀人, Ōnishi Hideto; born 23 August 1959) is a Japanese politician and the current mayor of Takamatsu, the capital city of Kagawa Prefecture, Japan.
