= Kojin Nakakita =

Japanese ice hockey player

Kojin Nakakita (中北 浩仁, Nakakita Kōjin; born 28 September 1963 in Takamatsu, Kagawa Prefecture) is a Japanese sledge hockey coach. He has been the head coach of Japan's national sledge hockey team since 2002. The team won a silver medal at the 2010 Winter Paralympics.

Nakakita began playing ice hockey when he was 6. When he was 12, without speaking any English, he arrived in Vancouver, Canada by himself to attend the University of British Columbia Thunderbirds summer hockey school. Two years later, he was sponsored by Terry O'Malley (a former Canadian player who played in Japan) and arrived in Chatham, Ontario to play midget AAA hockey. Following a stay at Athol Murray College of Notre Dame in Wilcox, Saskatchewan, he attended the United States International University in San Diego, where he played college hockey during the 1984–85 and 1987–88 NCAA seasons before suffering a career-ending knee injury.

He returned to Japan and was hired by Hitachi for his ability to speak English. He was the managing director of Hitachi India from 2015 to 2017.
