= Shioya (surname) =

Shioya (written: 塩屋) is a Japanese surname. Notable people with the surname include:

- Kōzō Shioya (born 1955), Japanese voice actor
- Shun Shioya (born 1982), Japanese actor
- Yoku Shioya (born 1958), Japanese voice actor, brother of Kōzō
