= Ōmachi Station (Kagawa) =

Railway station in Takamatsu, Kagawa Prefecture, Japan

Ōmachi Station 大町駅
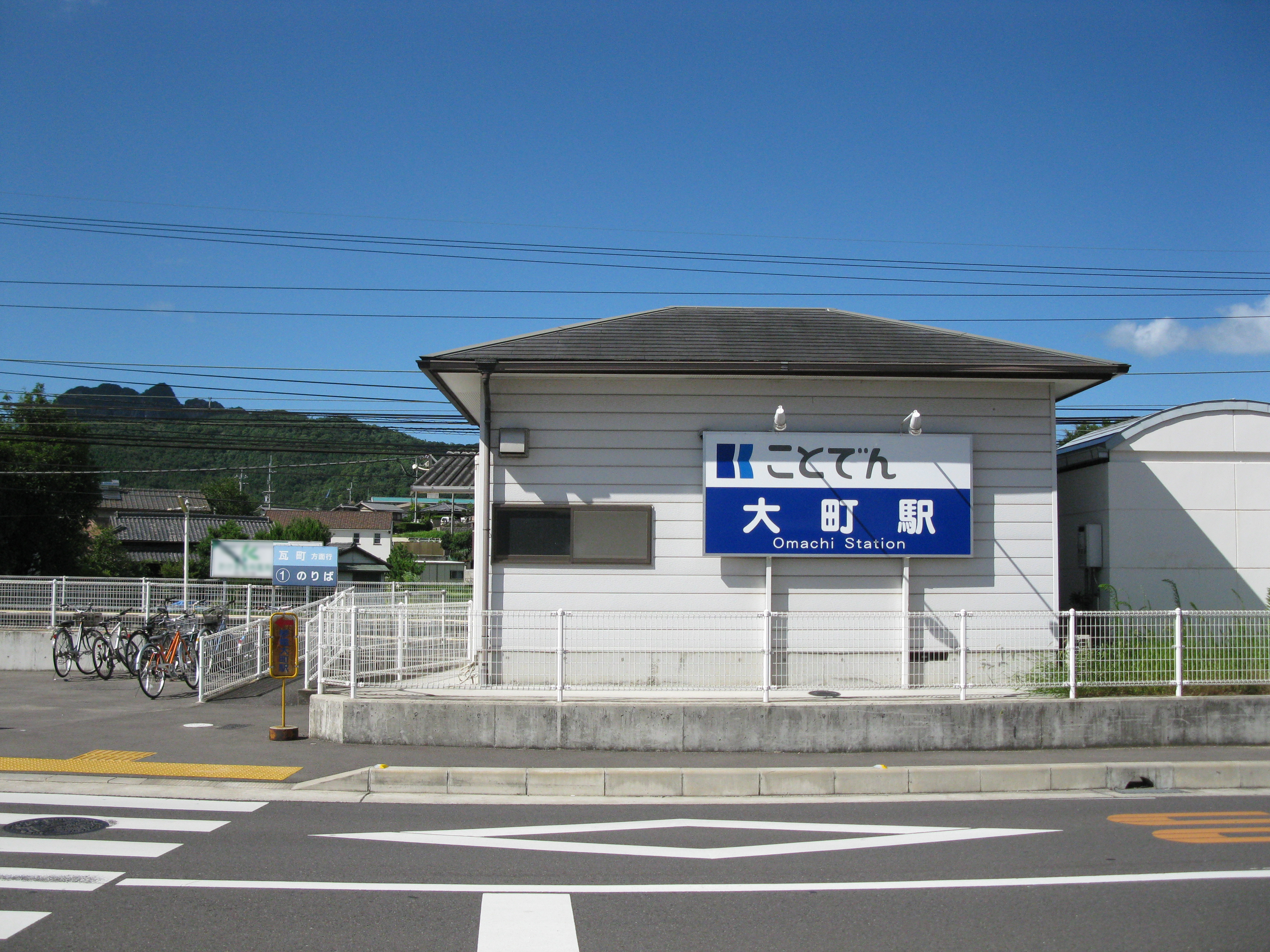
- Ōmachi Statio

General information
- Location: Murecho Omachi, Takamatsu-shi, Kagawa-ken 761-0122; Japan
- Coordinates: 34.3374°N 134.1413°E
- Operator: Takamatsu-Kotohira Electric Railroad
- Line: ■ Shido Line
- Distance: 8.7 km from Kawaramachi
- Platforms: 2 side platforms

Construction
- Structure type: At-grade
- Parking: No
- Cycle facilities: Yes
- Accessible: Yes

Other information
- Status: Unstaffed
- Station code: S10

History
- Opened: November 18, 1911

Passengers
- FY2017: 360 per day
Location
- Location within Kagawa Prefecture Location within Japan

Ōmachi Station (大町駅, Ōmachi-eki) is a passenger railway station located in the city of Takamatsu, Kagawa, Japan. It is operated by the private transportation company Takamatsu-Kotohira Electric Railroad (Kotoden) and is designated station "S10".

== Lines ==
Ōmachi Station is a station of the Kotoden Shido Line and is located 8.7 km from the opposing terminus of the line at Kawaramachi Station.

== Layout ==
The station consists of two opposed side platforms connected by a level crossing. The station is unattended.

== Adjacent stations ==
«	Service	»
Kotoden Shido Line
Rokumanji	Local	Yakuri-Shinmichi

== History ==
Ōmachi Station opened on November 18, 1911 on the Tosan Electric Tramway. It became a station of the Sanuki Electric Railway in 1942. On November 1, 1943 it became a station on the Takamatsu-Kotohira Electric Railway. Operations were suspended on January 26, 1945 from Yakuri Station to this station, but were reopened on October 9, 1949.

== Passenger statistics ==
Ridership per day
Year	Ridership
2011	293
2012	301
2013	335
2014	351
2015	373
2016	373
2017	360

== Surrounding area ==
- Takamatsu City Mure Elementary School
- Takamatsu City Mure Junior High School
- Japan National Route 11

== See also ==
- List of railway stations in Japan
