= Kotoden-Shido Station =

Railway station in Sanuki, Kagawa Prefecture, Japan

Kotoden-Shido Station 琴電志度駅
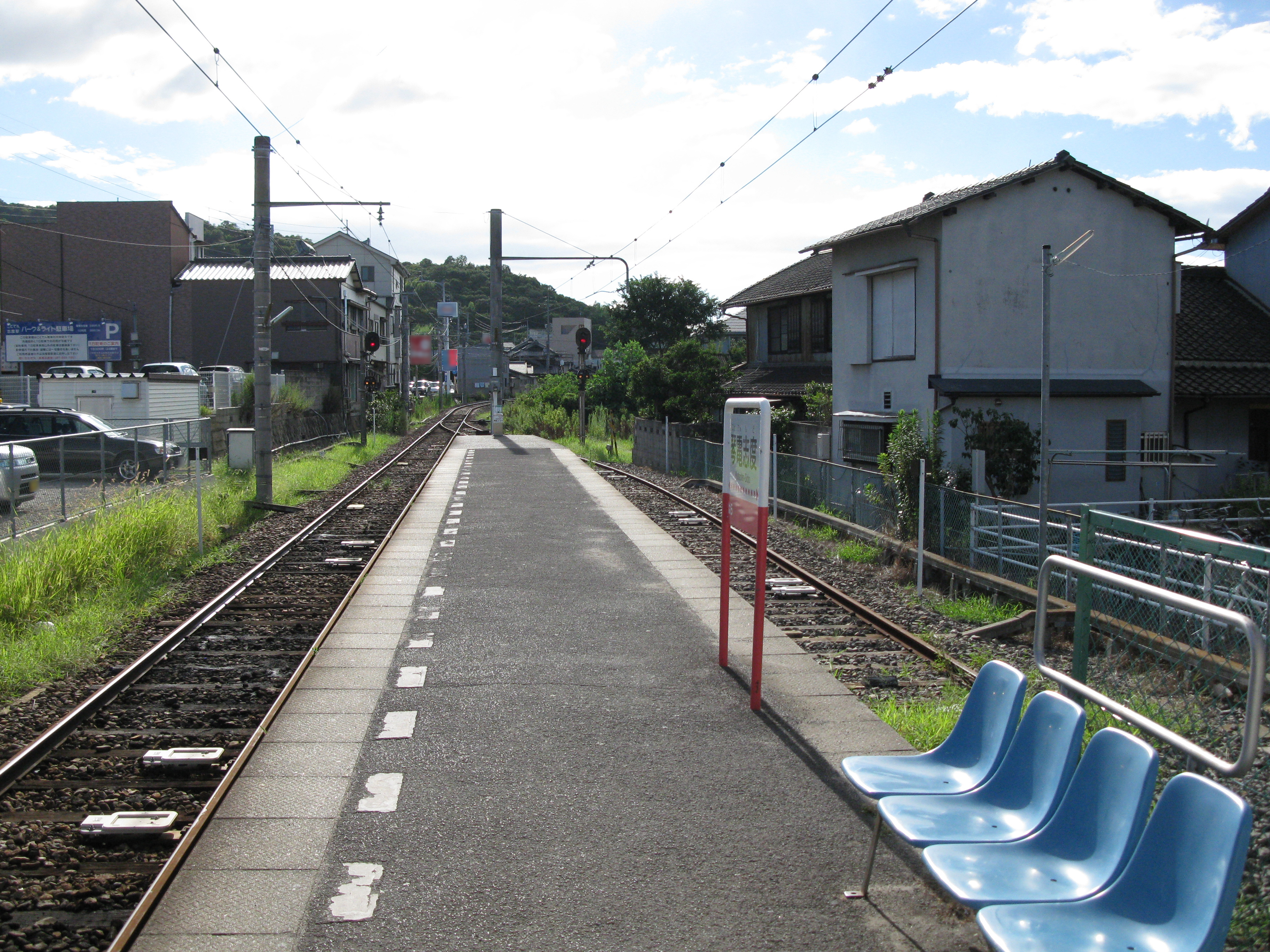
- Kotoden-Shido Station platform

General information
- Location: Shido, Sanuki-shi, Kagawa-ken 769-2101; Japan
- Coordinates: 34.3225°N 134.1729°E
- Operator: Kotoden
- Line: ■ Shido Line
- Distance: 12.5 km from Kawaramachi
- Platforms: 1 island platform
- Connections: JR Shikoku: Kōtoku Line (via Shido)

Construction
- Structure type: At-grade
- Parking: Yes
- Cycle facilities: Yes
- Accessible: Yes

Other information
- Station code: S15

History
- Opened: November 18, 1911
- Former names: Shido (to 1932), Shido Ekimae (to 1949)

Passengers
- FY2017: 1,114 per day

Services
Preceding station	Kotoden	Following station
Hara towards Kawaramachi	Shido Line	Terminus
Location
- Location within Kagawa Prefecture Location within Japan

Kotoden-Shido Station (琴電志度駅, Kotoden-Shido-eki) is a passenger railway station located in the city of Sanuki, Kagawa, Japan. It is operated by the private transportation company Takamatsu-Kotohira Electric Railroad (Kotoden) and is designated station "S15".

== Lines ==
Kotoden-Shido Station is the eastern terminus of the Kotoden Shido Line and is located 12.5 km from the opposing terminus of the line at Kawaramachi Station.

== Layout ==
The station consists of a single deadheaded island platform, but basically only one track on the south side is used. The north side is shortened by a connecting corridor from the platform to the night duty facility, so even with a 2-car train, the driver's cab door protrudes from the platform. The station is staffed.

== History ==
Kotoden-Shido Station opened on November 18, 1911 as Shido Station on the Tosan Electric Tramway. At that time, it was 50 meters west of the current location. It was relocated to its current location and renamed Shido Ekimae Station (志度駅前駅) in May 1932. On November 1, 1943 it became a station on the Takamatsu-Kotohira Electric Railway. Operations were suspended on January 26, 1945 from Yakuri Station to this station on the Shido Line, but were reopened on October 9, 1949, at which time the station was renamed to Kotoden Shido Station

== Passenger statistics ==
Ridership per day
Year	Ridership
2011	1,040
2012	1,059
2013	1,080
2014	1,121
2015	1,137
2016	1,156
2017	1,114

== Surrounding area ==
- Shido-ji (Temple No.86 on the Shikoku Pilgrimage)
- Shido Station - Shikoku Railway (JR Shikoku) Kotoku Line
- Sanuki City Hall
- Kagawa Prefectural Shido High School

== See also ==
- List of railway stations in Japan
