= Takamatsu-Kotohira Electric Railroad =

Railway company in Kagawa Prefecture, Shikoku, Japan

Takamatsu-Kotohira Electric Railroad 高松琴平電気鉄道

Overview
- Stations operated: 53
- Headquarters: Takamatsu, Kagawa Prefecture, Japan
- Locale: Shikoku, Japan
- Dates of operation: 1 November 1943–present
- Predecessor: Takamatsu Electric Tramway (1909); Tosan Electric Railway Company (1910); Kotohira Electric Railway (1924)

Technical
- Track gauge: 1,435 mm (4 ft 8 1/2 in) (1945–present); 1,067 mm (3 ft 6 in) (until 1945)
- Electrification: 1,500 V DC overhead catenary (1945–present); 600 V DC overhead catenary (until 1966)
- Length: 60 km (37 mi)

Other
- Website: Official website

Takamatsu-Kotohira Electric Railroad Co., Ltd. (高松琴平電気鉄道株式会社, Takamatsu-Kotohira Denki Tetsudō Kabushiki-gaisha), officially Kotoden (ことでん) for short, is a transportation company in Kagawa Prefecture, on the island of Shikoku, Japan. With headquarters in Takamatsu, the company operates three passenger railway lines, as well as bus subsidiaries. It was established on 1 November 1943. In 2021, it reported sales of ¥2,881,000,000 with a capitalization of ¥250,000,000.

== History ==
View from inside a Kotoden train watching as another train pulls up past it, 2021

The company traces its origins to 1909, when Takamatsu Electric Tramway (高松電気軌道, Takamatsu Denki Kidō) was founded. This company opened the Nagao line on 30 April 1912 between Dehare (出晴) (close to the present Kawaramachi Station) and Nagao Station. The line was originally 1,067 mm (3 ft 6 in) and electrified at 600V DC, but it was regauged to 1,435 mm (4 ft 8 1/2 in) in June 1945, and the overhead line voltage was raised to 1500V DC in December 1976.

In 1910, Tosan Electric Railway Company (東讃電気軌道, Tosan Denki Kidō) was established, and opened the Shido line on 18 November 1911 between Imabashi and Shido Station (now Kotoden-Shido). The line was electrified at 600V DC, and increased to 1500V DC in August 1966.

In 1924, Kotohira Electric Railway (琴平電鉄, Kotohira Dentetsu) was established, opened a line on 21 December 1926 between Ritsurin-Kōen and Takinomiya.

In 1943, the modern-day company, Kotoden, was established by the wartime merger of these three rail lines in the Takamatsu area. Immediately after its establishment, it absorbed the bus transportation operations in the vicinity. Aerial bombing destroyed some lines during the Pacific War. After the war, the company extended its line to Takamatsu Chikkō Station, a few minutes walk from JR Shikoku's Takamatsu Station. Its network took its present form in the early 1950s.

Since the beginning of the 21st century, three new stations have opened on the Kotohira Line: Kūkōdōri on 29 July 2006, Ayagawa on 15 December 2013, and Fuseishi on 28 November 2020.

== Lines and infrastructure ==
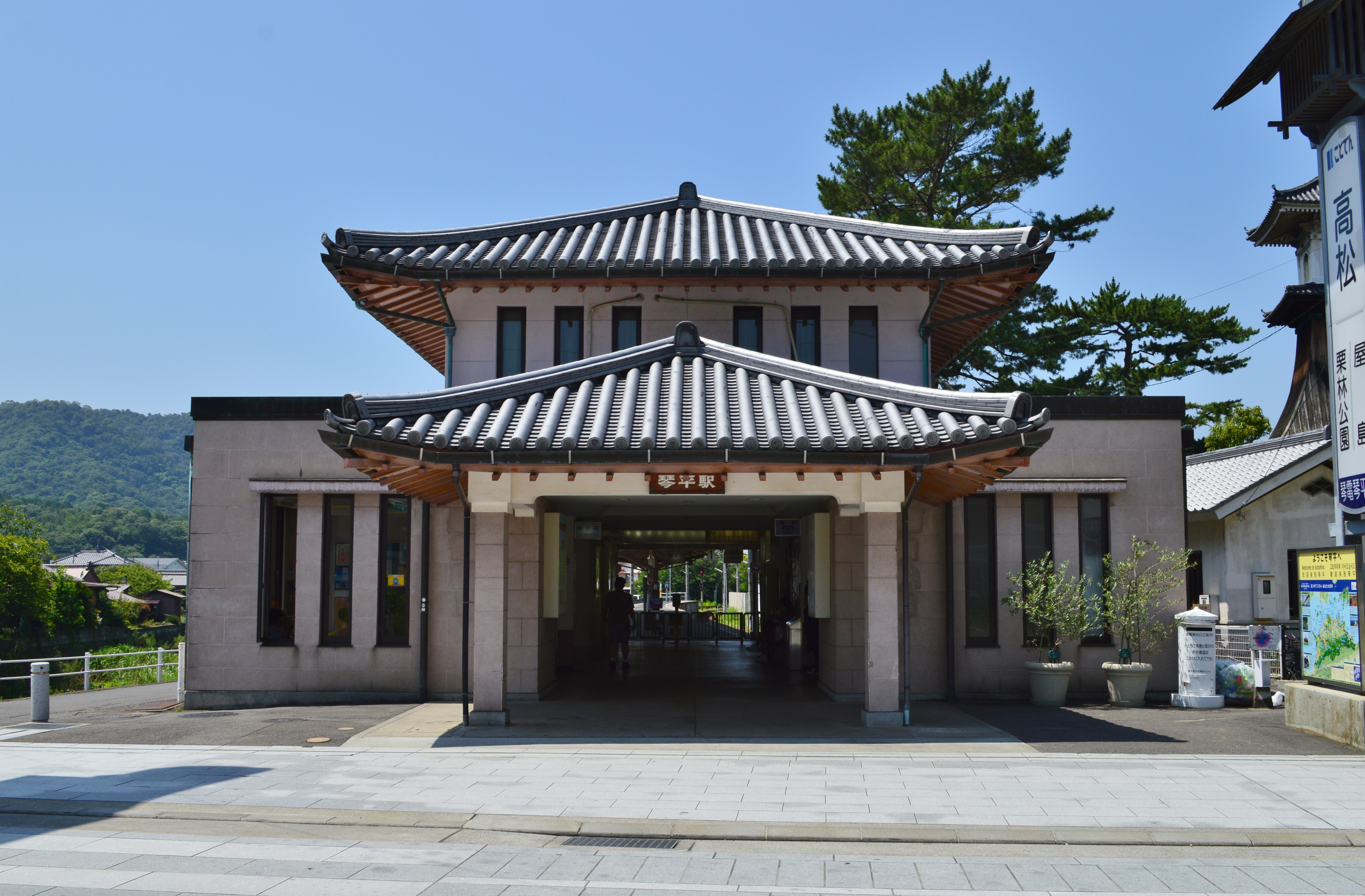
Kotoden-Kotohira Station

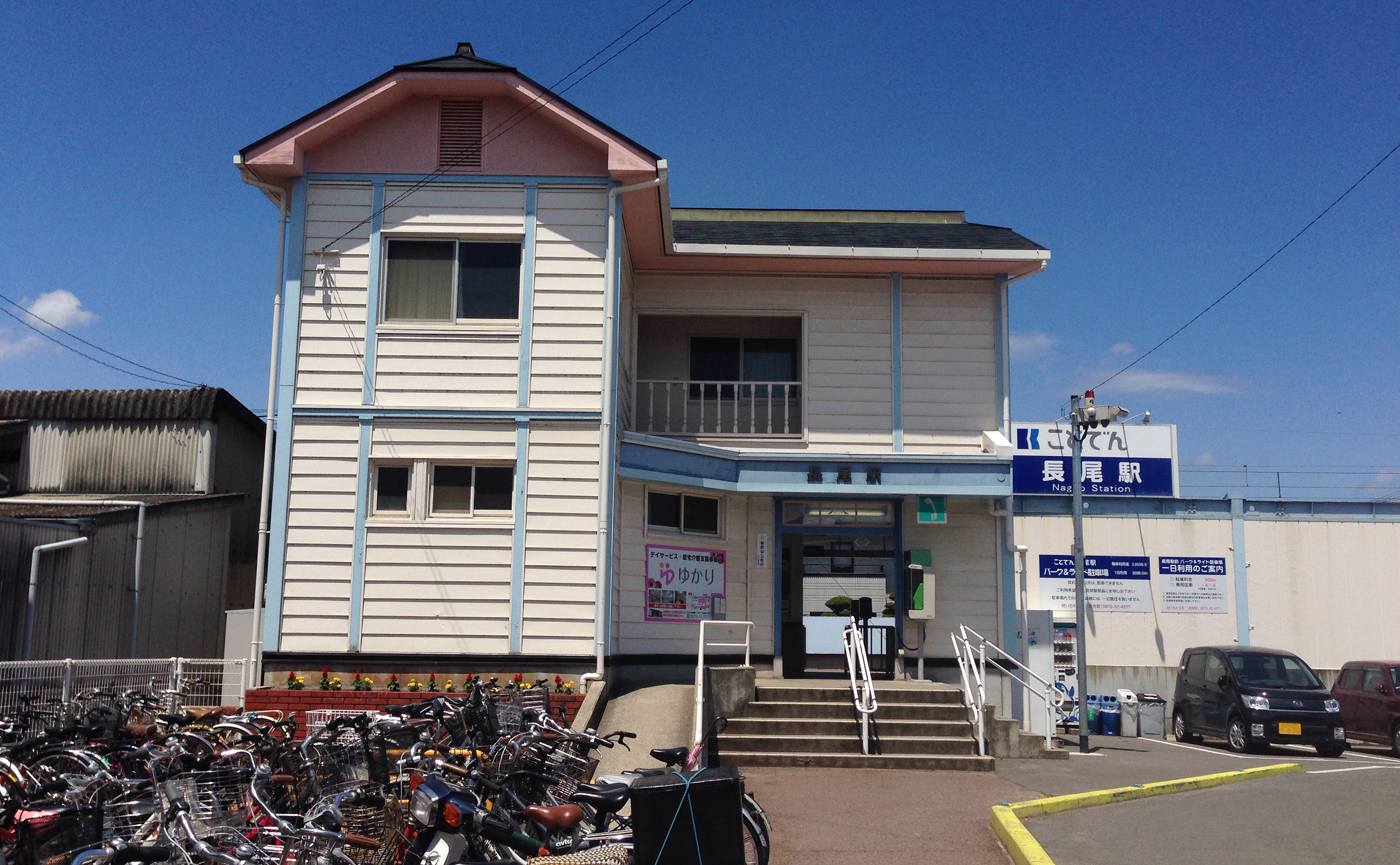
Nagao Station

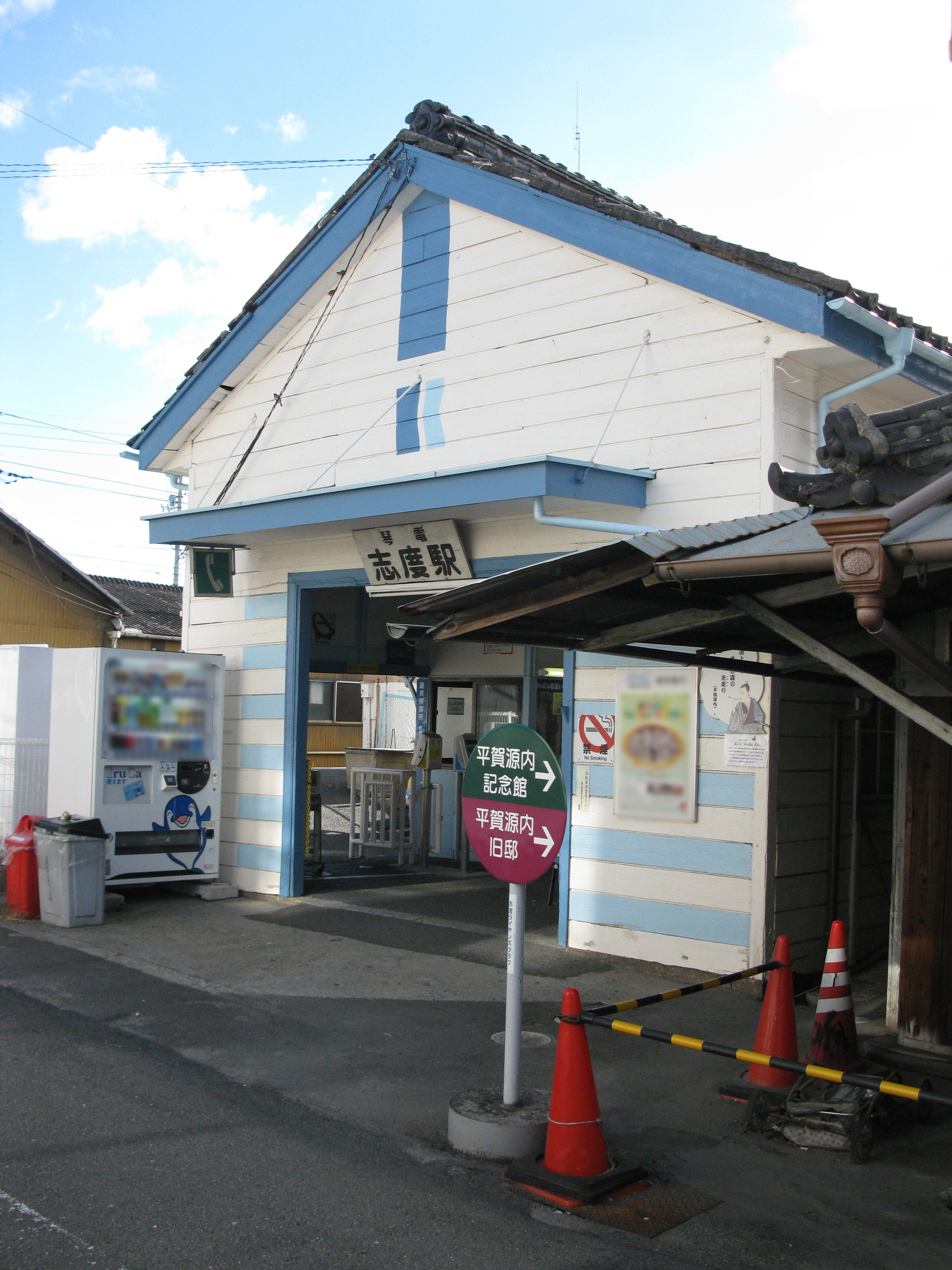
Kotoden-Shido Station

Kotoden operates three lines:

- ■ Kotohira Line (yellow)
  - 32.9 km, the longest line. Its terminals are Takamatsu-Chikkō Station in the center of Takamatsu, and Kotoden-Kotohira Station in the town of Kotohira.
  - The line is mostly single track, standard gauge and electrified at 1500V DC. The downtown section between Takamatsu-Chikkō and Ritsurin is double-tracked. With the opening of Fuseishi station, the section between Sanjo and Ota was also upgraded to double track.
  - 23 stations.
- ■ Nagao Line (green)
  - 14.6 km. It connects Takamatsu-Chikkō with Nagao Station in the city of Sanuki. The official start of the line is at Kawaramachi, but all trains provide through service to Takamatsu-Chikkō.
  - The line between Kawaramachi and Nagao is single track, standard gauge and electrified at 1500V DC.
  - 18 stations, of which 3 are shared with the Kotohira line.
- ■ Shido Line (red)
  - Opened 1911/17 as a 600 VDC line, later increased to 1500 VDC in 1966.
  - 12.5 km, the shortest line. Its termini are Kawaramachi in Takamatsu and Kotoden-Shido in Sanuki.
  - Single track, standard gauge and electrified at 1500V DC.
  - 16 stations (including the Kawaramachi terminal on the Kotohira/Nagao lines).

A 16 km line from Busshozan (on the Kotohira line) to Shionoe operated between 1929 and 1941. It was replaced by a bus service.

The Kotoden network

== Train services and rolling stock planning ==
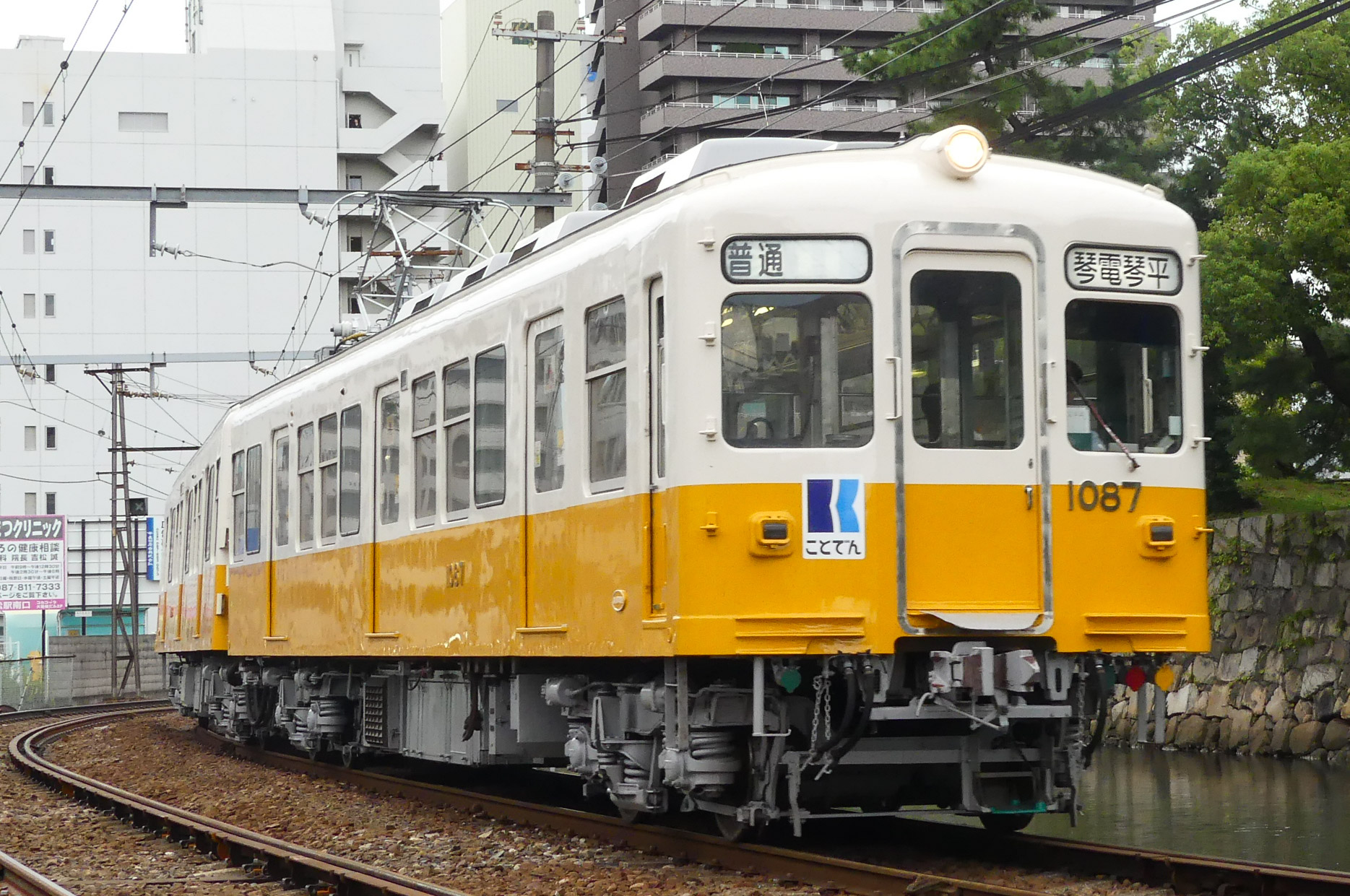
Kotohira Line train

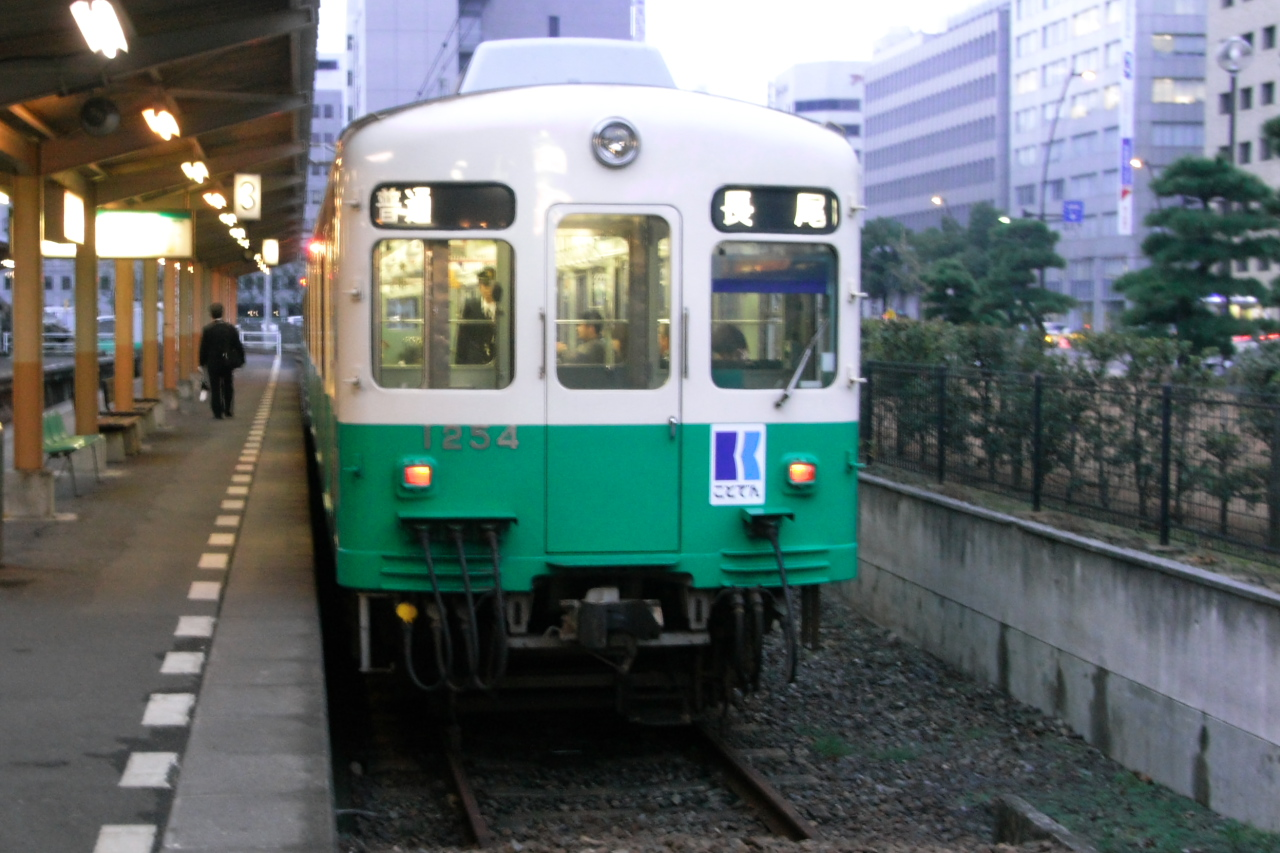
Nagao Line train

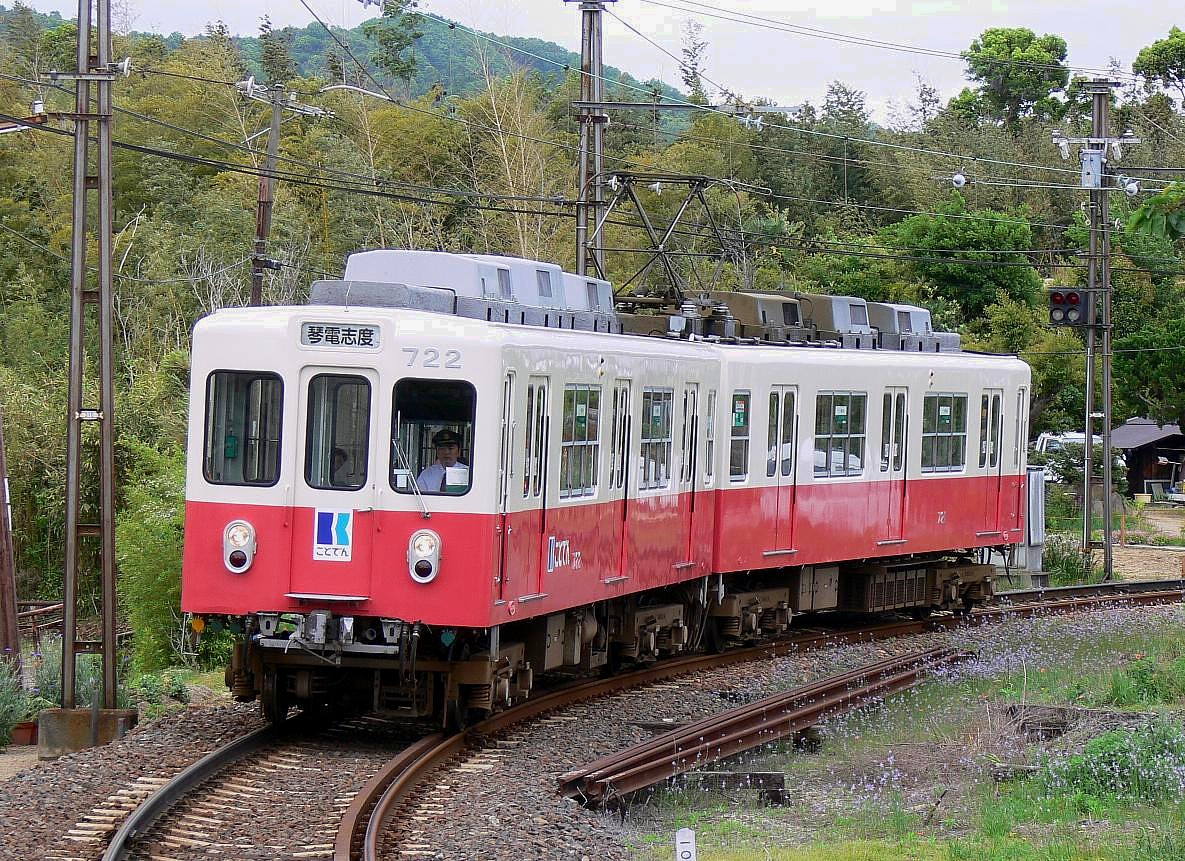
Shido Line train

Kotoden operates a pattern timetable on all three lines.

=== Kotohira Line ===
- A regular half-hourly service operates all day between Kotohira and Takamatsu-Chikkō (6.00 - 22.00 from Takamatsu-Chikkō and 5.42 - 21.12 from Kotohira). The travel time is 61 minutes each way. With an 11-minute turnaround time in Kotohira and 17 minutes and in Takamatsu-Chikkō, one trainset needs 2,5 hours to make the round trip, which means there are five trainsets needed to run the half-hourly service.
- During the daytime, there is an additional half-hourly service between Ichinomiya and Takamatsu-Chikkō. This daytime service has a 21-22 minute travel time, with a turnaround time of less than a minute in Ichinomiya and 17 minutes in Takamatsu-Chikkō, meaning one trainset would need one hour to make the round trip. However, when both services are running, the trains can make a 2-minute turnaround in Takamatsu-Chikkō (the train coming in from Ichinomiya goes back as a Kotohira service and vice versa). This saves one trainset, so that there are six trainsets needed for the daytime service.
- During the morning and evening peak hours (roughly between 6.00 - 8.00 and 18.00 - 20.00), the Ichinomiya service is extended to Takinomiya. The travel time of the Takinomiya service is 41 minutes each way. With a 21-minute turnaround time in Takinomiya, there are eight trainsets needed for the peak hour service.
- During the busiest morning peak (roughly between 7.45 and 8.45) there is an additional 15-minute service between Busshozan and Takamatsu-Chikkō, with the round trip taking 45 minutes, which would mean three additional trainsets needed, but here again, Kotoden made an optimised schedule: the 7.45 outbound Takinomiya service ends in Ichinomiya and this trainset is used for the inbound Busshozan service. In total the full peak service is operated with ten trainsets.

The variation in peak vs. off-peak demand/frequencies is also used in a smart way to get the trains in and out of their respective depots, so that very little empty runs are needed. Four trainsets start and end in Kotohira, two in Takinomiya and another four at the main depot, located at Busshozan station. Basically, all services are operated with two cars, but during the peak hours, most trains are operated with four cars. The lengthening/shortening of the trains is done in Busshozan.

=== Nagao Line ===
- The basic interval on the Nagao Line is 24 minutes. During peak hours, the frequency is doubled, giving a 12-minute interval. The travel time is around 40 minutes, with a turnaround time of 8 minutes in Takamatsu-Chikko and 6 minutes in Nagao, resulting in a round trip of 96 minutes. This means 8 trainsets are needed for the peak hour service.

Basically, all trains run end to end, but shorter workings (starting/ending in Hiragi or Kawaramachi) are used to get the trains in and out of the depots. Three trains start and end in Nagao, three trains in Kawaramachi and one train in Hiragi. The eighth trainset starts/ends in Takamatsu-Chikkō (empty running from/to the main Busshozan depot for cleaning/maintenance). All trains run in a two-car formation.

=== Shido Line ===
- The basic interval on the Shido Line is 24 minutes. This interval is the same as on the Nagao Line, allowing for good connections between the two lines in Kawaramachi. Unfortunately, the timetables of both lines do not share the same symmetry minute. Therefore, a good connection (4–6 minutes changing time) is only provided from Shido to Takamatsu-Chikkō. In the other direction, long waiting times occur during the off-peak periods. The travel time on the Shido line is around 38 minutes, with a turnaround time of 16 minutes in Kawaramachi and 3 minutes in Nagao, resulting in a round trip of 96 minutes. This means four trainsets are needed for the basic service.
- During the busiest morning peak, three additional train pairs are added between Kawaramachi and Omachi, reducing the interval on that section to 12 minutes. With a running time of 26 minutes and a turnaround time of 3 minutes in Omachi, it is not possible to do the return trip within 48 minutes. Nevertheless, this service can run with only two extra trainsets, because a short turnaround of 4 minutes is possible in Kawaramachi when both services are running. In total, the peak service is operated with six trainsets.

Except for the extra peak hour services, all trains run end to end. Two trains start in Shido and four trains in Kawaramachi (Imabashi depot). All trains run in a two-car formation.

== Rolling stock ==
Having inherited most of its rolling stock from different areas across Japan (notably, Keikyu, Keiō and Nagoya Municipal Subway), Kotoden is also known as the "Moving Train Museum".

As of October 2020, Kotoden has 80 passenger cars. Of these, 40 were in use on the Kotohira Line, 20 on the Nagao Line, and 20 on the Shido Line. It also has two heritage cars.

Kotoden introduced new 2000 series trains from October 2026, marking the operator's first newly built train type in 66 years.

== Other ==
In 1997, the railroad was the first to introduce new track safety precautions in order to combat the rising number of rail suicides. In the first year after new measures were implemented, the number of suicides on Kotoden tracks fell by 40%.

In 2001, Kotoden filed for bankruptcy. This was followed by a survey, asking residents, “Do you need Kotoden or not?". In Japanese, this question ends with the phrase "iru ka", which sounds the same as the Japanese word for “dolphin”. As a result, Kotoden chose a dolphin as its mascot in 2002. In doing so, the company always reminds itself to become a company needed by the citizens.

In February 2005, the company introduced an IC card ticketing system named IruCa.

In 2011, Kotoden celebrated their 100th anniversary.

Despite other rail companies introducing "one-man" or driver-only operation in order to reduce operational expenses, Kotoden previously chose not to do so. More than a quarter of its stations also remain staffed. However, in March 2023, driver-only operation was introduced for all trains on the Nagao Line.

In the wake of the 2022 invasion of Ukraine, Kotoden painted one of its trains in the colors of the Ukrainian flag, along with a message in support for the employees of Ukrzaliznitsya. The train entered service on 19 April 2022.
