= Kagawa 2nd district =

Legislative district of Japan

Kagawa 2nd District
- 香川県第2区
- Parliamentary constituency for the Japanese House of Representatives
- Prefecture: Kagawa
- Proportional District: Shikoku
- Electorate: 256,773 (as of September 2022)

Current constituency
- Created: 1994
- Seats: One
- Party: DPFP
- Representative: Yuichiro Tamaki
- Municipalities: Sakaide, Sanuki, Higashikagawa, Kita District, Ayauta District, Part of Takamatsu, and Part of Marugame

Kagawa 2nd district is a constituency of the House of Representatives in the Diet of Japan, located in Kagawa prefecture. As of September 2022, it had 256,773 eligible voters.

== Area ==
The district includes the following municipalities:

- Sakaide
- Sanuki
- Higashikagawa
- Miki Town
- Ayagawa Town
- Utazu Town
- The former towns of Aji, Kokubunji, Kagawa, Kōnan, Shionoe and Mure who merged with Takamatsu in 2005 or 2006
- The former towns of Ayauta and Hanzan who merged with Marugame in 2005

== List of representatives ==
Election	Representative	Party	Notes
1996	Yoshio Kimura	Liberal Democratic	
2000	Yoshio Kimura	Liberal Democratic	
2003	Yoshio Kimura	Liberal Democratic	
2005	Yoshio Kimura	Liberal Democratic	
2009	Yuichiro Tamaki	Democratic	Incumbent
2012	Yuichiro Tamaki	Democratic	Incumbent
2014	Yuichiro Tamaki	Democratic	Incumbent
2017	Yuichiro Tamaki	Kibō	Incumbent
2021	Yuichiro Tamaki	DPP	Incumbent
2024	Yuichiro Tamaki	DPP	Incumbent
2026	Yuichiro Tamaki	DPP	Incumbent

== Election results ==
2026 Japanese Election
Party	Candidate	Votes	%	±%
DPP	Yūichirō Tamaki	82,752	59.9	▼6.5
LDP	Takakazu Seto (elected in PR block)	46,747	33.8	▲5.0
Sanseitō	Yuriko Akiyama	8,605	6.2	
Turnout			57.96	▲3.01
DPP hold				

2024
Party	Candidate	Votes	%	±%
DPP	Yuichiro Tamaki	89,899	66.4	▲2.9
LDP	Takakazu Seto (won seat in PR block)	39,006	28.8	▼7.7
JCP	Mayu Ishida	6,466	4.8	
Turnout			54.95	▼3.58
DPP hold				

2021
Party	Candidate	Votes	%	±%
DPFP	Yuichiro Tamaki (Incumbent)	94,530	63.50	New
Liberal Democratic	Takakazu Seto	54,334	36.50	▼3.90
Registered electors		258,730		
Turnout			58.53	▲2.21
DPP hold				

2017
Party	Candidate	Votes	%	±%
Kibō	Yuichiro Tamaki (Incumbent)	82,345	55.49	New
Liberal Democratic	Takakazu Seto (Incumbent-Shikoku PR block)	59,949	40.40	▼0.20
Communist	Tadashi Kawamura	6,098	4.11	▲0.53
Registered electors		267,905		
Turnout			56.32	
Kibō no Tō hold				

2014
Party	Candidate	Votes	%	±%
Democratic	Yuichiro Tamaki (Incumbent)	78,797	55.82	▲5.78
Liberal Democratic	Takakazu Seto (Incumbent-Shikoku PR block) (reelected by Shikoku PR block)	57,318	40.60	▼4.93
Communist	Mamoru Saeki	5,050	3.58	▼0.85
Turnout				
Democratic hold				

2012
Party	Candidate	Votes	%	±%
Democratic	Yuichiro Tamaki (Incumbent)	79,153	50.04	▼7.13
Liberal Democratic	Takakazu Seto (elected by Shikoku PR block)	72,030	45.53	▲4.18
Communist	Mamoru Saeki	7,010	4.43	▼0.77
Turnout				
Democratic hold				

2009
Party	Candidate	Votes	%	±%
Democratic	Yuichiro Tamaki	109,863	57.17	▲18.26
Liberal Democratic	Yoshio Kimura (Incumbent)	79,463	41.35	▼14.54
Happiness Realization	Misako Doi	2,848	1.48	New
Turnout				
Democratic gain from LDP				

2005
Party	Candidate	Votes	%	±%
Liberal Democratic	Yoshio Kimura (Incumbent)	100,794	55.89	▼0.47
Democratic	Yuichiro Tamaki	70,177	38.91	▲0.83
Communist	Tadashi Kawamura	9,382	5.20	▼0.37
Turnout				
LDP hold				

2003
Party	Candidate	Votes	%	±%
Liberal Democratic	Yoshio Kimura (Incumbent)	85,370	56.36	▲2.78
Democratic	Mitsuhiro Manabe	57,676	38.08	▲4.28
Communist	Tadashi Kawamura	8,430	5.57	▼1.78
Turnout				
LDP hold				

2000
Party	Candidate	Votes	%	±%
Liberal Democratic	Yoshio Kimura (Incumbent)	84,030	53.58	▼25.13
Democratic	Mitsuhiro Manabe	53,015	33.80	New
Communist	Hisashi Matsuura	11,532	7.35	▼13.94
Independent	Takeshi Inozuka	8,265	5.27	New
Turnout				
LDP hold				

1996
Party	Candidate	Votes	%	±%
Liberal Democratic	Yoshio Kimura	98,531	78.71	New
Communist	Hisashi Matsuura	26,658	21.29	New
Turnout				
