= Crying Out Love in the Center of the World =

Crying Out Love, In the Center of the World
- Film poster
- Directed by: Isao Yukisada
- Written by: Isao Yukisada; Yuji Sakamoto; Chihiro Ito
- Based on: Socrates in Love by Kyoichi Katayama
- Produced by: Kei Haruna; Minami Ichikawa
- Starring: Mirai Moriyama; Masami Nagasawa; Rio Kanno; Issei Takahashi; Takao Osawa; Kou Shibasaki; Kankurō Kudō; Tsutomu Yamazaki
- Production companies: Tokyo Broadcasting System; Hakuhodo; Shogakukan; Stardust Pictures; Mainichi Broadcasting System; Toho
- Distributed by: Toho
- Release date: 8 May 2004
- Running time: 138 minutes
- Country: Japan
- Language: Japanese
- Box office: ¥8.5 billion (Japan) $2.13 million (overseas)

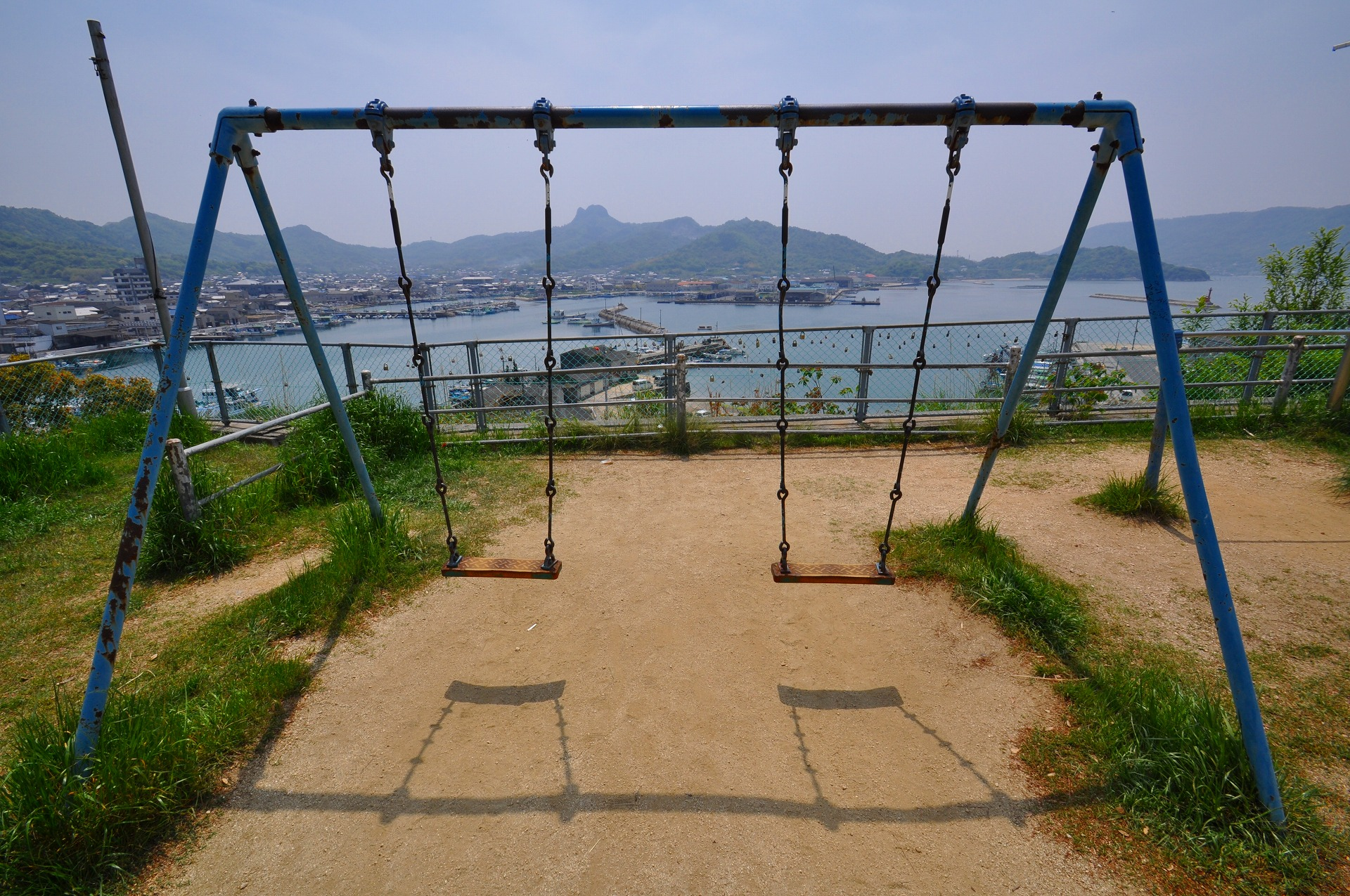
Swing set at Oji Jinja (皇子神社), Aji, Kagawa

Crying Out Love in the Center of the World (Japanese: 世界の中心で、愛をさけぶ, Hepburn: Sekai no Chūshin de, Ai o Sakebu) is a 2004 Japanese drama film directed by Isao Yukisada and based on the novel Socrates in Love by Kyoichi Katayama. The story follows a man Sakutarou (Takao Osawa) who returns to his hometown and listens to audio diaries recorded by his school sweetheart Aki (Masami Nagasawa). Sakutarou rediscovers through flashbacks the void deep within him caused by the events from his high school days.

The film opened in Japan on 8 May 2004, which brought Nagasawa recognition as an actress. It was a financial success, and its theme song, "Hitomi o Tojite" (With My Eyes Closed) by Ken Hirai, became a successful single. It 2005, it was remade in South Korea as My Girl and I.

== Plot ==
In a neglected box in her Tokyo apartment, Ritsuko finds a teenage girl's audio diary on an old cassette. Ritsuko's fiancé Saku spots her in a television report at Takamatsu Airport about an approaching typhoon. He realizes she has gone to their hometown in Shikoku and goes after her. There, at his family home, he discovers a box of audio cassettes. He listens to them while retracing his steps from his school life.

In 1986, the teenage Saku attends the funeral of his school principal. The eulogy reader, popular school athlete Aki, catches his eye and they begin seeing each other. Saku's uncle Shigezou, a photographer, tells him he was once the principal's lover. At his request, Aki and Saku steal the principal's remains from the cemetery and give them to Shigezou.

Hoping to win a Walkman, Saku and Aki write to a local radio station that reads out listeners' stories of tragic romance. When Saku wins by concocting a story about a girl with leukemia, Aki records a tape chastising him, saying it is wrong to lie about such things. He apologizes and they begin exchanging long messages on tape. After they visit an uninhabited island and find an old camera with undeveloped film inside, Aki collapses and is admitted to hospital.

In the present, Ritsuko finds Saku in the school, engrossed in Aki's tapes, but does not disturb him. As the typhoon approaches, she takes shelter in Shigezou's shop and sees a photo of the young Saku and Aki in wedding clothes. Shigezou tells her he took the photo shortly before Aki's death.

In the past, Aki tells Saku she has leukemia. The young Ritsuko delivers Aki's tapes to Saku's school pigeonhole. Shigezou develops the old film from the island, revealing photos of Uluru in Australia. Ritsuko delivers the photos to Aki in the hospital, who is captivated by them. Saku promises her they will visit Uluru.

Aki sneaks away from the hospital with Saku to have passport photos taken at Shigezou’s shop. Inspired by Shigezou's wedding photography, she asks him to take a photo that people can remember her by and they stage a wedding photo. When Aki returns to the hospital, she learns her friend, another leukemia patient, has died suddenly.

Aki's condition worsens. She loses her hair and is moved to a sterile ward. Though they can no longer have physical contact, Saku proposes to her. He meets her at midnight to take her to Uluru, but at the airport, all flights are canceled because of a typhoon and Aki collapses. In the hospital, the dying Aki records a goodbye tape for Saku. Ritsuko is hit by a car and fails to deliver the tape.

In the present, Ritsuko calls Saku from Shigezou's photo shop and apologizes for not delivering Aki's final tape. He goes to the shop but finds her gone, having left Aki's tape with Shigezou for him. Saku tells Shigezou he has never gotten over Aki's death and Shigezou comforts him. Saku reunites with Ritsuko at the airport, where the flights have been canceled because of the typhoon.

Saku and Ritsuko visit Uluru and Saku listens to Aki's final tape. Together they fulfil Aki's last wish: to have her ashes scattered at Uluru.

== Crew ==
- Film director & scenario – Isao Yukisada
- Filming – Noboru Shinoda
- Music – Meina Co.
- Theme songs – "Hitomi o Tojite" (瞳をとじて; With My Eyes Closed) by Ken Hirai
- Episode songs – "Someday" by Motoharu Sano, "Kimi ni Aete" (きみに会えて; To See You) by Misato Watanabe

== Cast ==
- Takao Osawa as Sakutaro "Saku" Matsumoto
  - Mirai Moriyama as teenager Sakutaro "Saku" Matsumoto
- Masami Nagasawa as Aki Hirose
- Kō Shibasaki as Ritsuko Fujimura
  - Rio Kanno as teenager Ritsuko Fujimura
- Tsutomu Yamazaki as Uncle Shige
- Kankurō Kudō as Ryunosuke Oki
  - Issei Takahashi as teenager Ryunosuke Oki
- Kanji Tsuda as Johnny
- Misato Watanabe as Radio DJ
- Tetta Sugimoto as Aki's father
- Yūki Amami as Sakutaro's superior
- Midori Kiuchi as Sakutaro's mother
- Misato Tanaka as Ritsuko's mother
- Yoshimitsu Morita as Film director
- Dandy Sakano as English teacher

== Filming location ==
- Aji, Kagawa
- Mure, Kagawa
- Konan, Kagawa
- Takamatsu Airport
- Sanuki, Kagawa
- Marugame, Kagawa
- Matsuyama, Ehime
- Ōzu, Ehime
- Masaki, Ehime
- Alice Springs, Northern Territory, Australia
