= Frank Shozo Baba =

Japanese American radio producer

Frank Shōzō Baba (フランク 正三 馬場, January 3, 1915 – January 16, 2008) was a Japanese American Nisei who made radio broadcasts during World War II in the United States and in post-war Japan. He spent twelve years in Japan from the age of six months; another six years from age 29, and four and half years from age 46. He was a member of Voice of America under the Office of War Information in June 1942, as well as in 1952 and 1960. He was well known for his contributions to the Japanese broadcasting industry after World War II at NHK under the Supreme Commander of the Allied Powers (GHQ) and in initiating commercial broadcasting in Japan.

== Early life ==
His father Tamotsu was from Ayauta, Kagawa, and worked for the Asahi Shimbun in Osaka. In 1904, he immigrated to San Francisco, seeking employment at the San Francisco Chronicle and The San Francisco Examiner. When he did not receive job offers from either newspaper, he returned to Japan, married Kiyo, who was born in Ayauta District, Kagawa, and then returned to California. Frank Shozo was born on the 3rd day of the Japanese New Year (正月, shōgatsu), thus he was named Shozo (正三, Shōzō), the meaning of which reflects the occasion.

When he was six months old, Frank Shozo was sent to his mother Kiyo's hometown in Ayauta District, Kagawa, Japan. There he was raised and educated until the age of twelve, when he returned to California. Baba studied at Oakland Technical High School and graduated from the Haas School of Business at the University of California, Berkeley. He also self-studied Japanese literature and competed in Japanese speech competitions. He lost his job after the Attack on Pearl Harbor, along with many other Japanese-Americans. His parents were confined to the Gila River War Relocation Center, and his father Tamotsu died there. The parents of his wife Fumie were assigned to Heart Mountain Relocation Center.

== World War II ==
After World War II began, the United States Navy opened a Japanese language school at the University of California, Berkeley to help commissioned officers learn Japanese. Baba was recommended as a language instructor by one of his university professors. He also obtained his translator license and became a certified civil servant. Baba was assigned to a section initially called "Coordinate Information", later renamed the Office of War Information (OWI). The Voice of America started in 1942, with Baba working on the news and commentary related to psychological warfare against the Japanese with radio shortwave, which was prohibited at that time in Japan.

Immediately you ought to cease the war
You are out-maneuvered by militaristic power, and led in the wrong way.

Baba made appeals such as these in Japanese, and worked for the VOA for three years. His program was titled "Japan versus Japan", and implicated that "Japanese citizen versus militaristic power or government", or that the government was leading Japan in the wrong direction.

When Japan accepted the Potsdam Declaration and agreed on the Surrender of Japan, he explained, in plain language, what this meant for ordinary Japanese citizens. When Nazi Germany surrendered on May 7, 1945, Baba was able to broadcast in Japanese, after seeing the incoming telex message. This was the first voiced information to the world, with translations for other languages taking 30 minutes.

== Post-war ==
Baba was assigned to the Strategic Bombing Survey-GHQ, and he arrived at Naval Air Facility Atsugi by C-54 Skymaster on November 2, 1945. On September 5, 1945, GHQ had already requisitioned the NHK building in Uchisaiwaichō, Tokyo. Baba became a key person of the CIE (Civil Information and Education Division) and deeply involved in the NHK radio program and its policy. GHQ deemed that radio broadcasting would be the strongest weapon to bring up democracy in post-war Japan.

Baba also arranged and guided entertaining programs. Popular ones included Information Please, Twenty Questions and Now It Can Be Told, with Japanese programs naming, to lit. Fountain of talking (話の泉), Twenty doors (二十の扉) and True story is this (眞相はかうだ). He planned, offered and involved NHK prior to the new election program for the 22nd Imperial Diet in 1946, as well as many other democratizing and entertaining programs.

== Commercial broadcasting in Japan ==
Baba worried about whether the democracy among Japanese people would be maintained after GHQ left Japan, they might revert to non-democratic ways quickly if NHK and newspapers were under the control of some of the remaining powers. He wanted to establish the commercial broadcasting system in parallel with NHK's monopoly, and would attempt to have his boss use his proposal to help persuade. The proposal was successfully brought to the CIE, which was the top level for GHQ. On October 16, 1947, GHQ noticed the strategic plan to establish a commercial broadcasting station in Japan.

In spite of GHQ planning, the Japanese government, ministry and NHK resisted strongly. Baba persuaded newspapers, advertising agencies and parts of the private sector to be in support of the plan for commercial broadcasting. At the end of 1949, GHQ grew tired of waiting for the promotion of commercial broadcasting by Japan, and, finally, GHQ was able to get a letter from Douglas MacArthur to Shigeru Yoshida.

There were 74 applications for commercial broadcasting, and 18 stations were approved by the end of 1951. The first commercial stations, Chubu-Nippon Broadcasting and Mainichi Broadcasting System, opened on September 1, 1951, and four more stations opened by the time Baba returned to California for VOA in February 1952.

The Strategic Bombing Survey team left Japan after 2 months of surveying. Baba, however, was recruited by the Japanese broadcasting industry to stay in Japan until the VOA had repeatedly urged him to come back to VOA. He worked for VOA a second time, until returning to Japan for a third time in 1961, assigned to the United States Information Agency of the Embassy of the United States in Tokyo.

He was in Tokyo right after the 1964 Summer Olympics of Tokyo. He worked for the VOA for a third time, as the chief of Japanese Service until finishing a Japanese-language program. Baba's final message was on February 28, 1970. VOA judged that Japan was well-informed enough of the world without VOA in Japanese language.

== Other topics ==
- He took care of Japanese journalists in Washington, D.C. during work for VOA the second and third time, such as arranging translator/interpreter, and took appointment with politicians, bureaucrats or others.
- After VOA ended the Japanese language program with his Sayonara, he moved to United States Information Agency.
- He arranged and was present when John F. Kennedy met NHK vice CEO in the White House on March 25, 1961.
- He received the Order of the Sacred Treasure, 3rd class (Gold Rays with Neck Ribbon), in 1986. His mother was very delighted with it, at the age of 100.
- At the age of 80, Japanese journalists, who had been taken care of by him earlier in Washington, D.C., celebrated his birthday with his wife in a hotel in Tokyo in 1995. Many people attended and thanked him for his past hospitality. Attendees included: Masaru Ibuka, Tsuneo Watanabe, Tetsuya Chikushi, Nobuhiko Shima and many former foreign correspondents in Washington, D.C.
- He moved to Alhambra, California, after retirement, where his son in law had an apartment business, in 1997.

== See also ==
- Supreme Commander of the Allied Powers
- United States Office of War Information
- Voice of America
