= Chunan =

Chunan may refer to:

- Chūnan, Kagawa, town in Nakatado District, Kagawa, Japan
- Chun'an County, county in Hangzhou, China

== See also ==
- Cheonan, a city in South Korea
