= Y11 =

Y11 may refer to:

== Train stations ==
- Gokokuji Station, in Bunkyō, Tokyo, Japan
- Jingan metro station, in Taipei, Taiwan
- Karugahama Station, in Kure, Hiroshima, Japan
- Nishi-Umeda Station, in Umeda, Kita-ku, Osaka, Japan
- Sanuki-Shioya Station, in Marugame, Kagawa, Japan

== Other uses ==
- Harbin Y-11, a Chinese aircraft
- LNER Class Y11, a locomotive class
- Y11 series, a car series of the Nissan Wingroad
- Year 11, an educational year group
