= Kaitenyama Kofun =

Kofun period burial mound cluster in Marugame, Kagawa, Japan

- 快天山古墳 (Japanese)
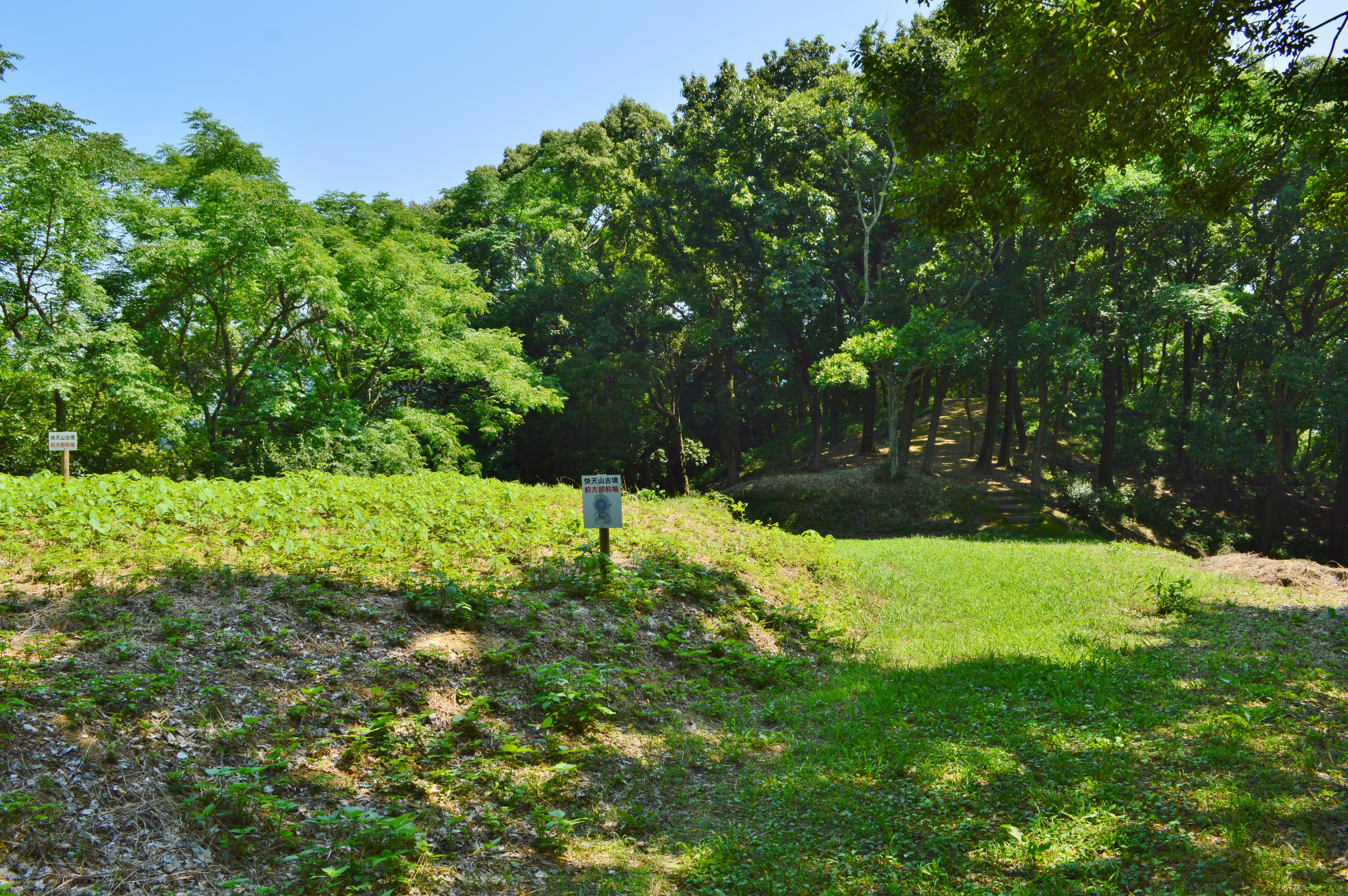
- Kaitenyama Kofun, posterior circular portion to the right

- Kaitenyama Kofun Kaitenyama Kofun (Japan)
- Interactive map of Kaitenyama Kofun
- 34°14′20″N 133°53′26″E
- Type: Kofun
- Periods: Kofun period
- Location: Marugame, Kagawa, Japan
- Region: Shikoku

History
- Built: early 4th century AD

Site notes
- Public access: Yes

The Kaitenyama Kofun (快天山古墳) is a kofun burial mound located in the Ayauta neighborhood of the city of Marugame, Kagawa Prefecture, on the island of Shikoku of Japan. The tumulus was designated a National Historic Site in 2004. It is the second largest burial mound in Kagawa Prefecture and the third largest in the Shikoku region, and is estimated to have been built around the middle of the 4th century (the latter half of the early Kofun period).

== Overview ==
The Kaitenyama Kofun is located at the tip of a ridge that emerges southward from the foot of Mt. Yokoyama in the central part of Kagawa Prefecture. On the top of the round part of the mound are the Edo Period tombs of Kaiten, Kaizan, and Yuga, monks of the nearby Buddhist temple of Enpuku-ji, and the tumulus name of 'Kaitenzan' is derived from this. An exposed sarcophagus was discovered by a local junior high school student in 1950, which resulted in an archaeological excavation, and several subsequent excavations have been carried out since then. The tumulus is a zenpō-kōen-fun (前方後円墳), which is shaped like a keyhole, having one square end and one circular end, when viewed from above. It has a total length of 98.8 meters, and was constructed in three or more tiers in the round posterior portion and three tiers in the rectangular anterior portion. The tumulus was covered in fukiishi and cylindrical haniwa lined the stops between tiers. No traces of a moat have been detected. The anterior part of the mound has been partially leveled due to the construction of roads and poultry farms accompanying the development of farmland.

Two pit-style stone burial chambers and one clay coffin burial facility were found, all within the round posterior portion, and all contain hollowed split bamboo-shaped sarcophaguses. This style of sarcophagus is centered on the Sanuki region of the early Kofun period, and th examples at this tumulus are the oldest known. The first and second chambers are arranged symmetrically from east to west across the center of the posterior circular part, and are lined with andesite; whereas the third chamber is arranged to the north of the center point: however, all chambers are parallel to the main axis of the tumulus. Records indicate that an additional four more burials were found in the anterior rectangular portion of the tumulus. but these were destroyed and the whereabouts of any artifacts recovered is unknown.

Numerous burial goods were recovered from each surviving burial chamber, including bronze mirrors, iron swords, iron axes, iron tools and farm implements, cylindrical beads and magatama. These artifacts date the tumulus to the middle of the 4th century. Based on the remaining bones, the deceased in the second chamber was female, estimated to be 30–35 years old and that of the third chamber was male, estimated to be 27–28 years old.

The tumulus is about ten minutes on foot from Takamatsu-Kotohira Electric Railroad Kotohira Line Kurikuma Station.

Overall length
98.8 meters
Posterior circular portion
63.5 to 68 meter diameter x 10.55 meter high x 3 tiers
Anterior rectangular portion
30 meters wide x 4.33 meters high x 3 tiers
Constriction width
32.5 meters

== See also ==
- List of Historic Sites of Japan (Kagawa)
