= Yoshio Kimura =

Yoshio Kimura may refer to:

- Yoshio Kimura (politician) (木村 義雄, born 1948), Japanese politician
- Yoshio Kimura (shogi) (木村 義雄, 1905–1986), Japanese shogi player
