= Kita District =

Kita District may refer to:

- Kita District, Ehime
- Kita District, Kagawa
