= Ayakami, Kagawa =

Dissolved municipality in Kagawa prefecture, Japan

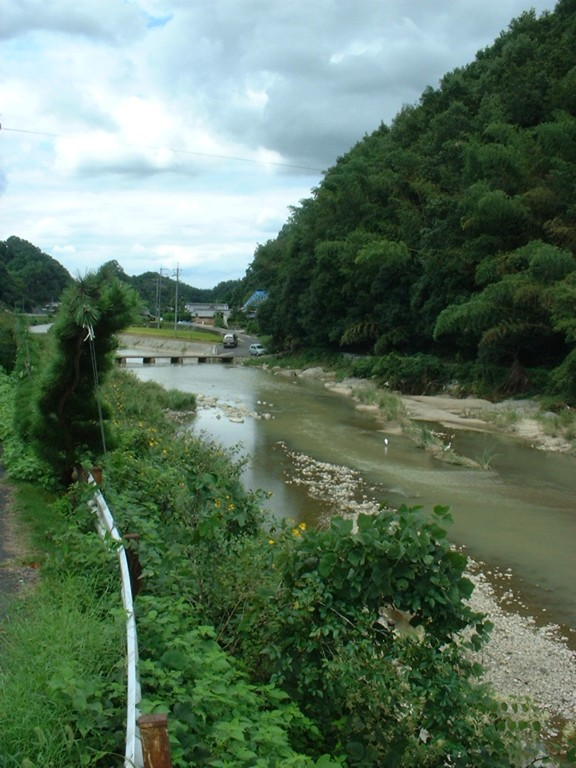
River near Ayagawa and Ayakami

Ayakami (綾上町, Ayakami-chō) was a town located in Ayauta District, Kagawa Prefecture, Japan.

As of 2003, the town had an estimated population of 6,720 and a density of 94.38 persons per km^{2}. The total area was 71.20 km^{2}.

On March 21, 2006, Ayakami, along with the town of Ryōnan (also from Ayauta District), was merged to create the town of Ayagawa.
