= Marugame Station =

Railway station in Marugame, Kagawa Prefecture, Japan

Y10 Marugame Station 丸亀駅
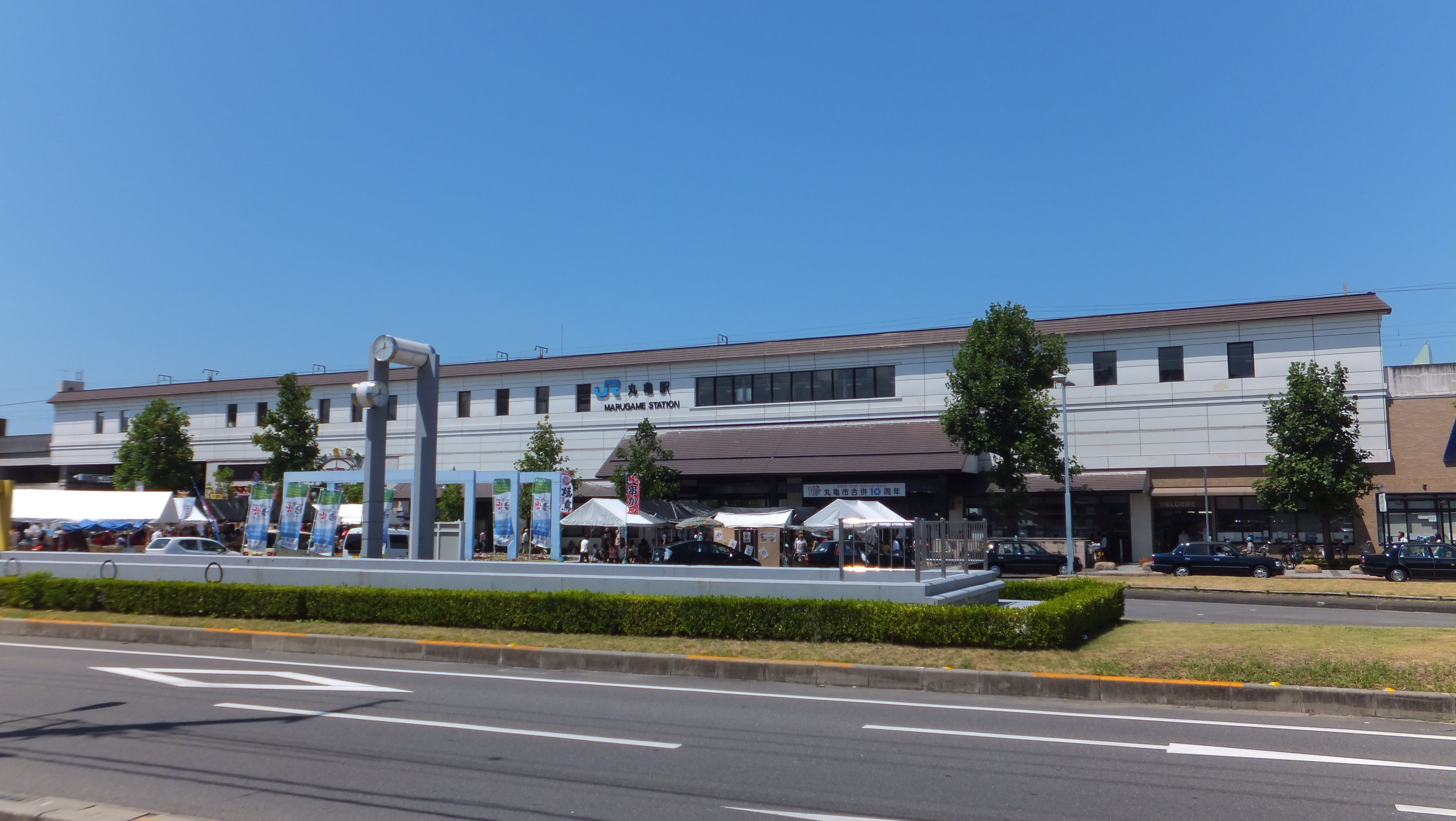
- Marugame Station, August 2015

General information
- Location: Hamamachi, Marugame-shi, Kagawa-ken 763-0022; Japan
- Coordinates: 34.2916°N 133.7930°E
- Operator: JR Shikoku
- Line: ■ Yosan Line
- Distance: 28.5 km fromTakamatsu
- Platforms: 2 side platforms

Construction
- Accessible: Yes

Other information
- Status: Staffed (Midori no Madoguchi)
- Station code: Y10

History
- Opened: 23 May 1889

Passengers
- FY2023: 3,707
Location
- Location within Kagawa Prefecture Location within Japan

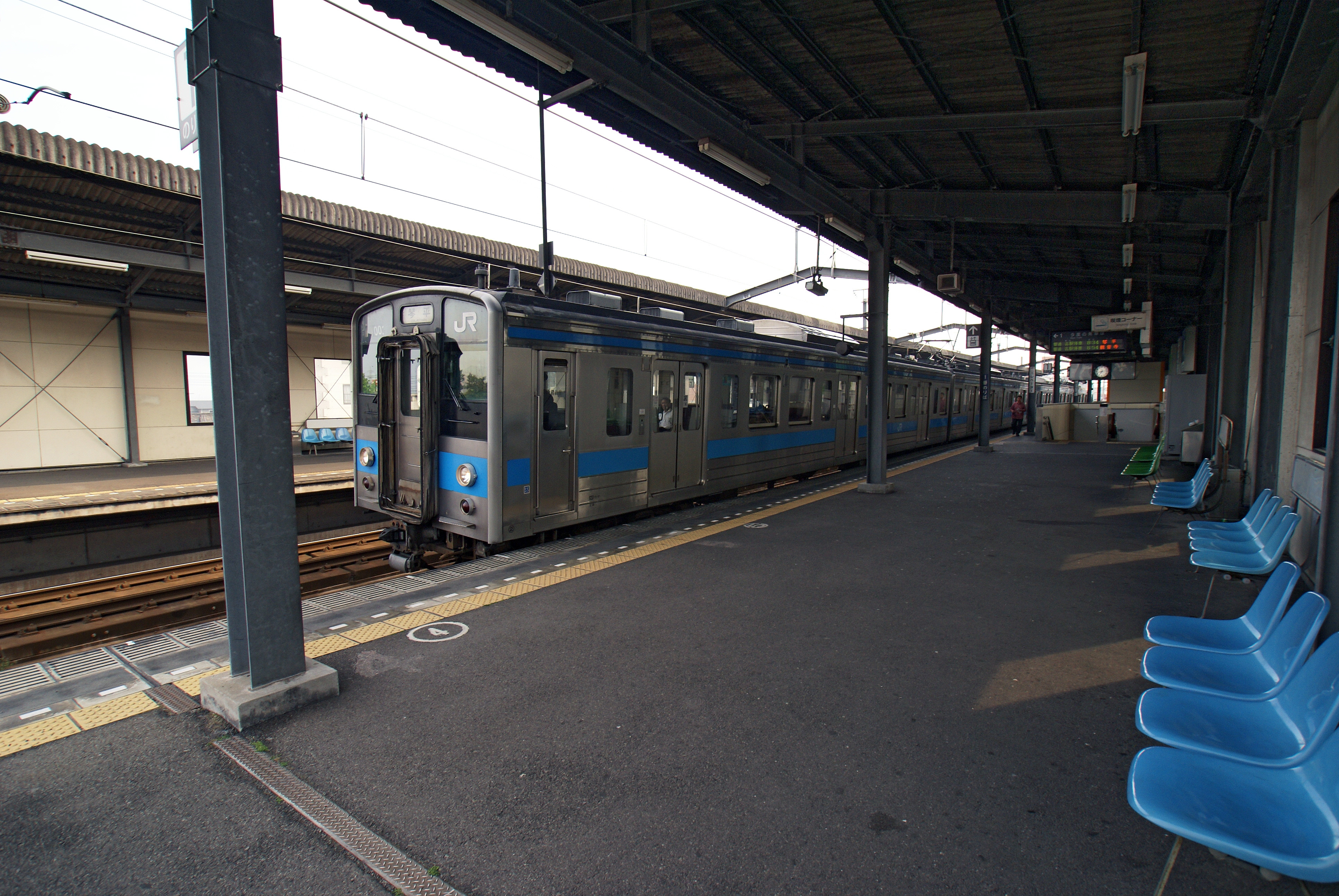

Marugame Station (丸亀駅, Marugame-eki) is a passenger railway station located in the city of Marugame, Kagawa Prefecture, Japan. It is operated by JR Shikoku and has the station number "Y10".

== Lines ==
The station is served by the JR Shikoku Yosan Line and is located 28.5 km from the beginning of the line at Takamatsu and 48.5 kilometers from Okayama. Except for special trains, all passenger trains including limited express trains stop at this station. In addition, there are several trains each day running a local service on the Seto-Ōhashi Line which stop at the station.

== Layout ==
Marugame Station consists of two elevated side platforms. The station building contains a Midori no Madoguchi staffed ticket office.

== Adjacent stations ==
«	Service	»
JR Shikoku
Yosan Line
Utazu	Local	Sanuki-Shioya

== History ==
Marugame Station opened on 23 May 1889, as a station on the Sanuki Railway. On 21 February 1891 the Sanuki Railway became the Sanyo Railway, which was subsequently nationalized on 1 December 1906. With the privatization of JNR on 1 April 1987, control of the station passed to JR Shikoku. The station was elevated in 1987.

== Surrounding area ==
Marugame Station is located almost halfway between Marugame Port, Marugame Castle, and Marugame City Hall. The Marugame Port Ferry Terminal (Shiwaku Islands Sea Route Terminal) is about 600m to the north, and the Marugame City Hall, which is located north of Marugame Castle, is about 800m to the south. Marugame Genichiro-Inokuma Museum of Contemporary Art and Marugame City Central Library are located on the west side of the south exit station square.

== See also ==
- List of railway stations in Japan
