= Kagawa District, Kagawa =

District in Kagawa prefecture, Japan

Coordinates: 34.4610°N 133.983°E

Kagawa District (香川郡, Kagawa-gun) is a district located in Kagawa Prefecture, Japan.

As of the January 10, 2006 Takamatsu merger (but with 2003 population statistics), the district consists of the single town of Naoshima and has an estimated population of 3,583 and a density of 251.97 persons per km^{2}. The total area is 14.22 km^{2}.

== Towns and villages ==
- Naoshima

== Mergers ==
- On September 26, 2005 the town of Shionoe merged into the expanded city of Takamatsu.
- On January 10, 2006 the towns of Kagawa and Kōnan, along with the towns of Aji and Mure, both from Kita District, and the town of Kokubunji, from Ayauta District, merged into the expanded city of Takamatsu.
