= Kotonami, Kagawa =

Dissolved municipality in Kagawa prefecture, Japan

Kotonami (琴南町, Kotonami-chō) was a town located in Nakatado District, Kagawa Prefecture, Japan.

As of 2003, the town had an estimated population of 3,056 and a density of 36.91 persons per km^{2}. The total area was 82.79 km^{2}.

On March 20, 2006, Kotonami, along with the town of Chūnan (also from Nakatado District), was merged into the expanded town of Mannō.

== Geography ==
Kotonami is located in the center of the northern face of the Sanuki Mountains which span across the southern part of Kagawa Prefecture. A class A river called the Doki River flows north to south through the center of town.

- Mountains: Mount Ryuno, Mount Daisen, Mount Kasagata, Mount Shiroyama
- Ponds: Bichuji Pond
- Rivers: Doki River

== History ==
- September 29, 1956 (Shōwa year 31) - Miai in Ayauta District was merged with Sōda to create Kotonami.
- November 1, 1957 (Shōwa year 32) - Kotonami became a part of Nakatado District due to border modifications.
- April 1, 1962 (Shōwa year 37) - Kotonami was converted from a village into a town.
- March 20, 2006 (Heisei year 18) - Kotonami and Chūnan merged to create Mannō, eliminating Kotonami.
