= Mannō, Kagawa =

Mannō まんのう町
- Town
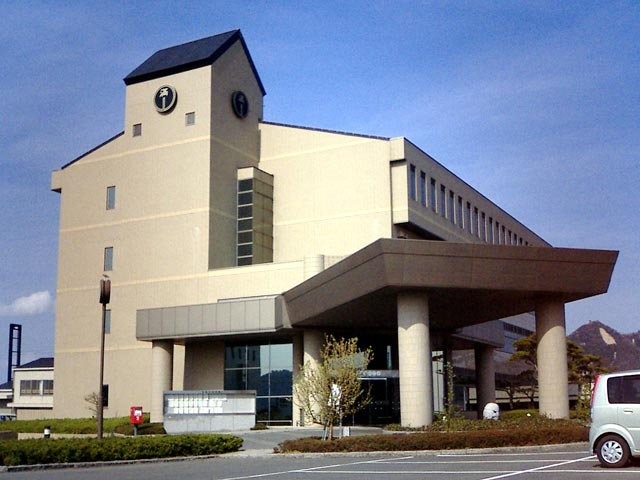
- Mannō Town Hall

- Flag Chapter
- Interactive map of Mannō
- Location in Japan
- Coordinates: 34°12′N 133°50′E
- Country: Japan
- Region: Shikoku
- Prefecture: Kagawa
- District: Nakatado

Government
  - Mayor: Takayoshi Kurita

Area
  - Total: 194.45 km^{2} (75.08 sq mi)

Population (October 1, 2022)
  - Total: 17,711
  - Density: 91.083/km^{2} (235.90/sq mi)
- Time zone: UTC+09:00 (JST)
- City hall address: Yoshino-shimo430, Manno-cho, Nakatado-gun, Kagawa-ken 766-0022
- Website: Official website

Mannō (まんのう町, Mannō-chō) is a town located in Nakatado District, Kagawa Prefecture, Japan. As of 1 October 2022, the town had an estimated population of 17,711 in 7477 households and a population density of 960 persons per km^{2}. The total area of the town is 194.45 square kilometres (75.08 sq mi).

== Geography ==
Manno is located at the northern foot of the Sanuki Mountains, which includes the highest peak in Kagawa Prefecture, the west peak of Mt. Ryuo (1060 meters), and the second highest peak, Mt. Okawa (1043 meters). Spread over hills in southern Kagawa Prefecture, the town has more than 900 large and small reservoirs, including Manno Lake, the largest irrigation reservoir in Japan. The Doki River flows through the north and south of the town.

=== Neighbouring municipalities ===
Kagawa Prefecture

- Ayagawa
- Kotohira
- Marugame
- Mitoyo
- Takamatsu
- Zentsūji

Tokushima Prefecture

- Higashimiyoshi
- Mima
- Miyoshi

=== Climate ===
Mannō has a humid subtropical climate (Köppen Cfa) characterized by warm summers and cool winters with light snowfall.

== Demographics ==
Per Japanese census data, the population of Mannō has been declining steadily since the 1950s.

Historical population
Year	Pop.	±%
1920	25,513	—
1930	26,057	+2.1%
1940	25,965	−0.4%
1950	32,880	+26.6%
1960	27,887	−15.2%
1970	23,674	−15.1%
1980	23,049	−2.6%
1990	22,497	−2.4%
2000	20,696	−8.0%
2010	19,087	−7.8%
2020	17,401	−8.8%

== History ==
The area of Mannō was part of ancient Sanuki Province. During the Edo Period, the town area was divided between the holdings of Takamatsu Domain, Marugame Domain and direct (tenryō) holdings of the Tokugawa Shogunate. The villages of Yoshino, Kanno and Shijo were established with the creation of the modern municipalities system on February 15, 1890. The three villages merged on April 1, 1955, to form the town of Mannō (満濃町). On March 20, 2006, Mannō absorbed the towns of Chūnan and Kotonami, both from Nakatado District and changed its name to its current hiragana spelling.

== Government ==
Mannō has a mayor-council form of government with a directly elected mayor and a unicameral town council of 16 members. Mannō, together with Kotohira, contributes two members to the Kagawa Prefectural Assembly. In terms of national politics, the town is part of Kagawa 3rd district of the lower house of the Diet of Japan.

== Economy ==
The local economy is heavily centered on agriculture.

== Education ==
Mannō has six public elementary schools and one public middle school operated by the town government. The town does not have a high school.

== Transportation ==
=== Railways ===
Shikoku Railway Company - Dosan Line

- Shioiri - Kurokawa

=== Highways ===
- National Route 32
- National Route 377
- National Route 438

== Local attractions ==
- Manno Lake:

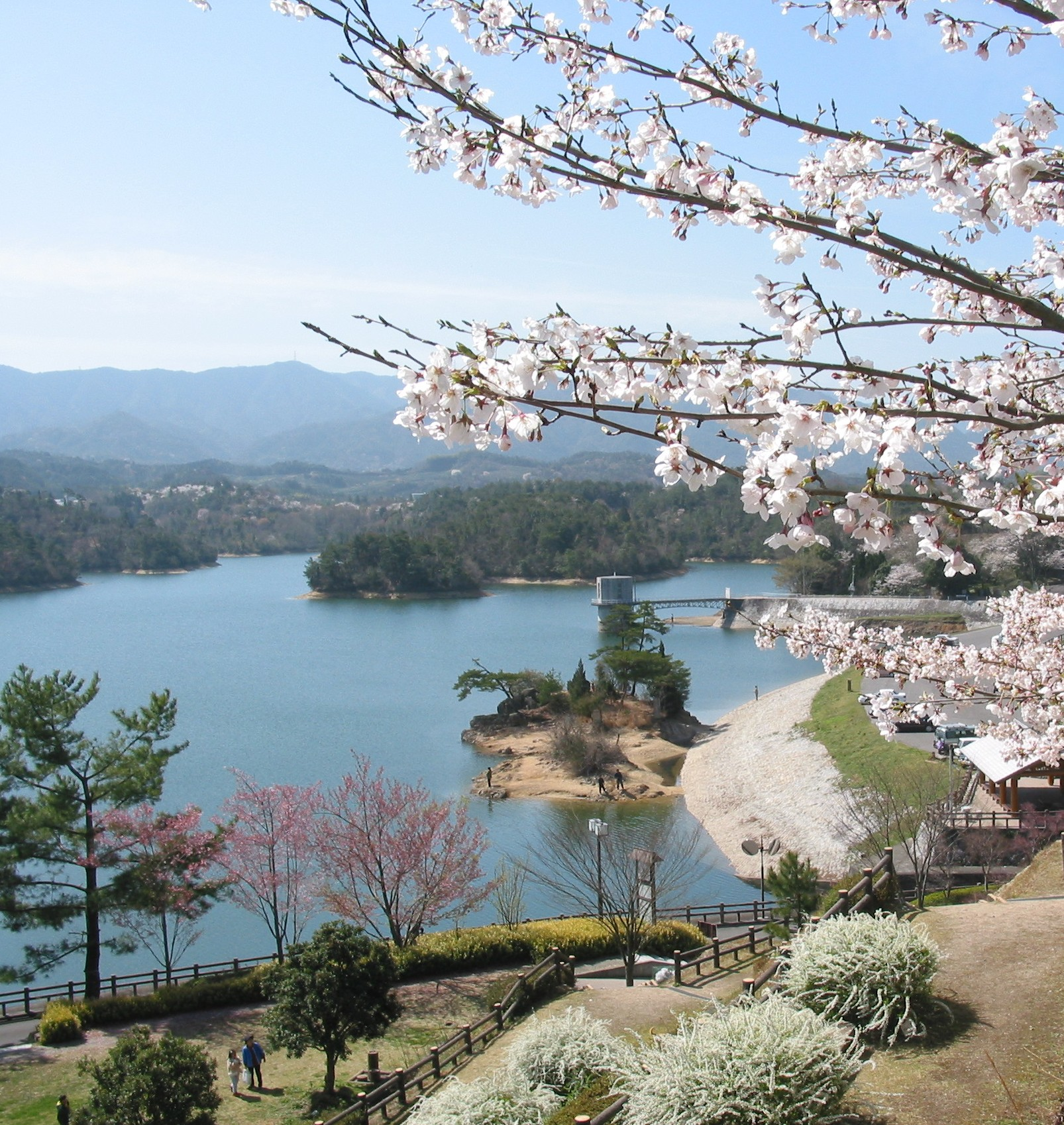
Manno Lake

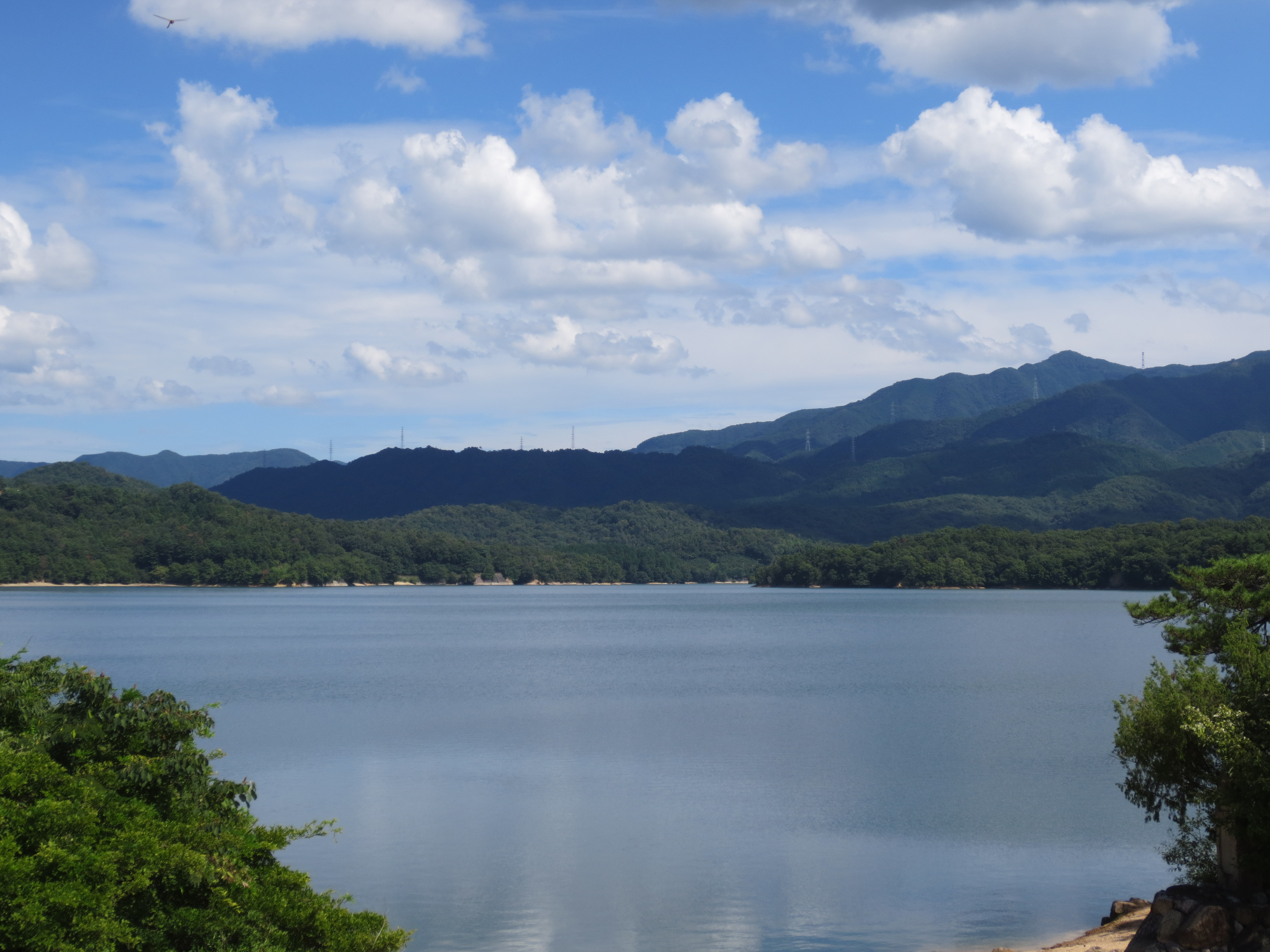
Mt. Daisen and Manno Lake

Nestled in the mountains, this lake reservoir is one of the largest in Japan, with a volume of 15,400,000 m^{3}. Kagawa has low rainfall, so rain dances and water reservoirs have been important throughout history, particularly for rice production. The original dam was built about 1,300 years ago, from 701 to 704. In 821 the dam lay in disrepair and a larger version was built by the Buddhist monk Kūkai on the Emperor's request. Since then the dam has fallen into disrepair and been rebuilt 3 times to reach its current size. The water is used for rice paddy irrigation, and every year in June there is a ceremony to start the yearly flow. Four tonnes of water gush out every second to reach rice paddies as far away as Marugame City. There is also a shrine and a temple near the lakefront.

- Sanuki Manno National Park:

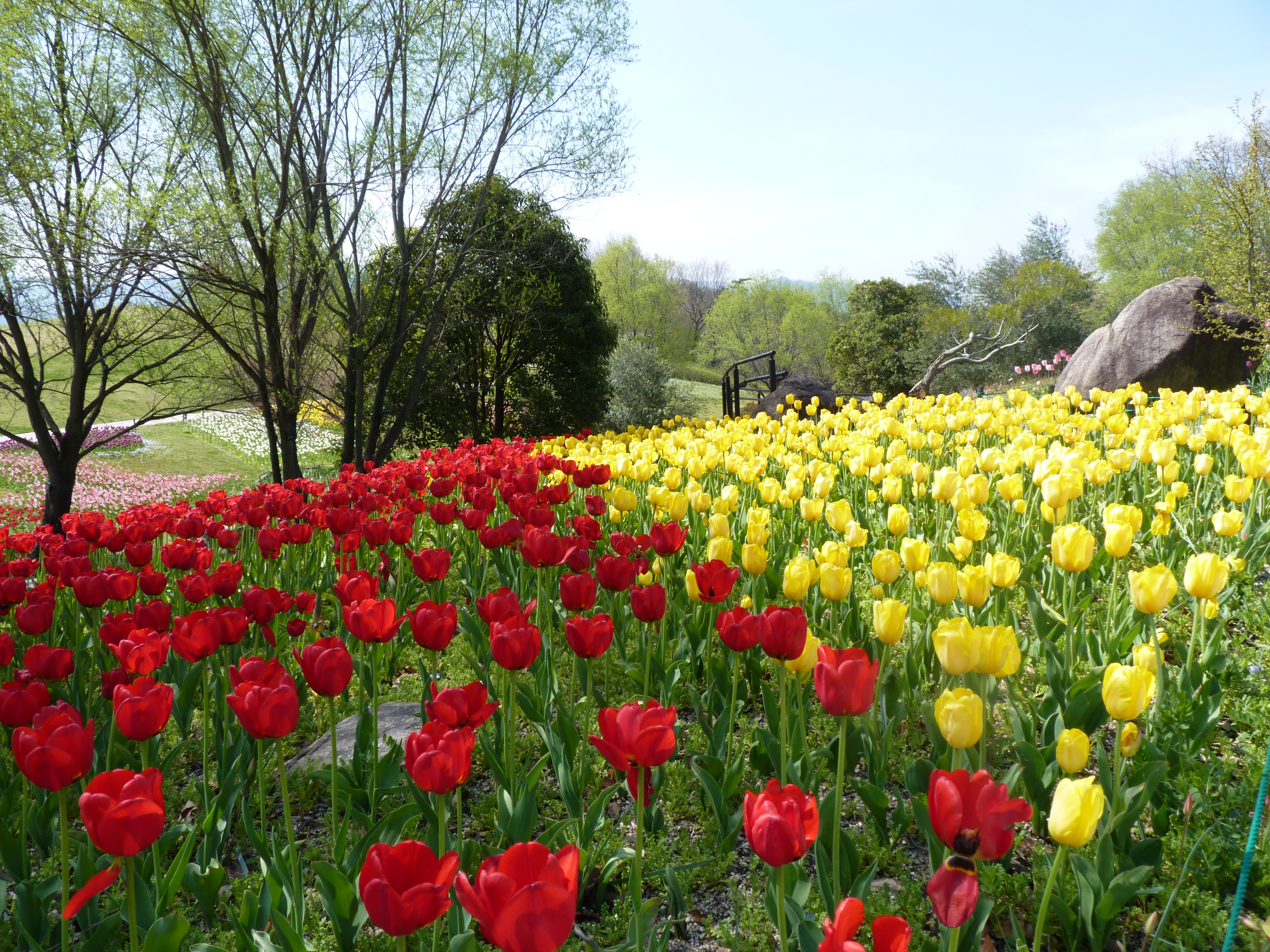
Tulip garden in Mannō

There are flower gardens for all four seasons, forest walks, large-scale events, rent a cycles and other fun activities. Boasts the largest camping car, sports and recreation area in Shikoku. In winter the “Winter Fantasy” illumination, one of the largest in Japan, is held. Some nights have a fireworks display. There is also an illumination on Valentine's Day.

- Sunflower fields and the Sunflower Festival:

250,000 sunflowers are grown every year over 5 hectares, a summer tradition in the Chunan area of Manno Town. The Sunflower Festival is held in July every year. A photo contest, sketching and live jazz featured and there are sunflower seed ice-cream, croquettes, and salad dressing stalls. There is also sunflower seed-fed beef and other food for sale.

- Ayako Rain Dance:

The Ayako Odori is performed as a prayer for rain. It is often performed by children and has been nominated as a UNESCO Intangible Cultural Heritage Lists. In 1976 it was registered as one of Japan's important cultural assets.

- Daisen Buddhist Rain Dance:

This rain dance takes place on the top of the second highest mountain in the Sanuki Mountain Range, Daisenzan(大川山). During prayers to end a drought in 734, it is said that a white snake came out of a pond, turned into a dragon, flew up to heaven and called the rainclouds in to make it rain. It is registered as a cultural asset in Kagawa. It is held on the closest Sunday to June 14 per the lunar calendar.

=== Onsen ===
- Epia Mikado:

A rest area facility near the border of Tokushima Prefecture. Mikadō onsen (美霞洞温泉, Mikado Hot Springs) was endorsed by the great 18th-century inventor Hiraga Gennai. The white cloudy water has an interesting texture and boasts to be one of the best quality springs in Kagawa. There is also a restaurant, shop with local goods and a small produce market.

- Shioiri Onsen:

These springs have alkaline medicinal waters. Restaurant, Shop, Local Produce. Shippoku Udon is only available in the cold season. There are 5 lodges that can be rented out, with an outdoor barbeque area for good times.

== Gallery ==
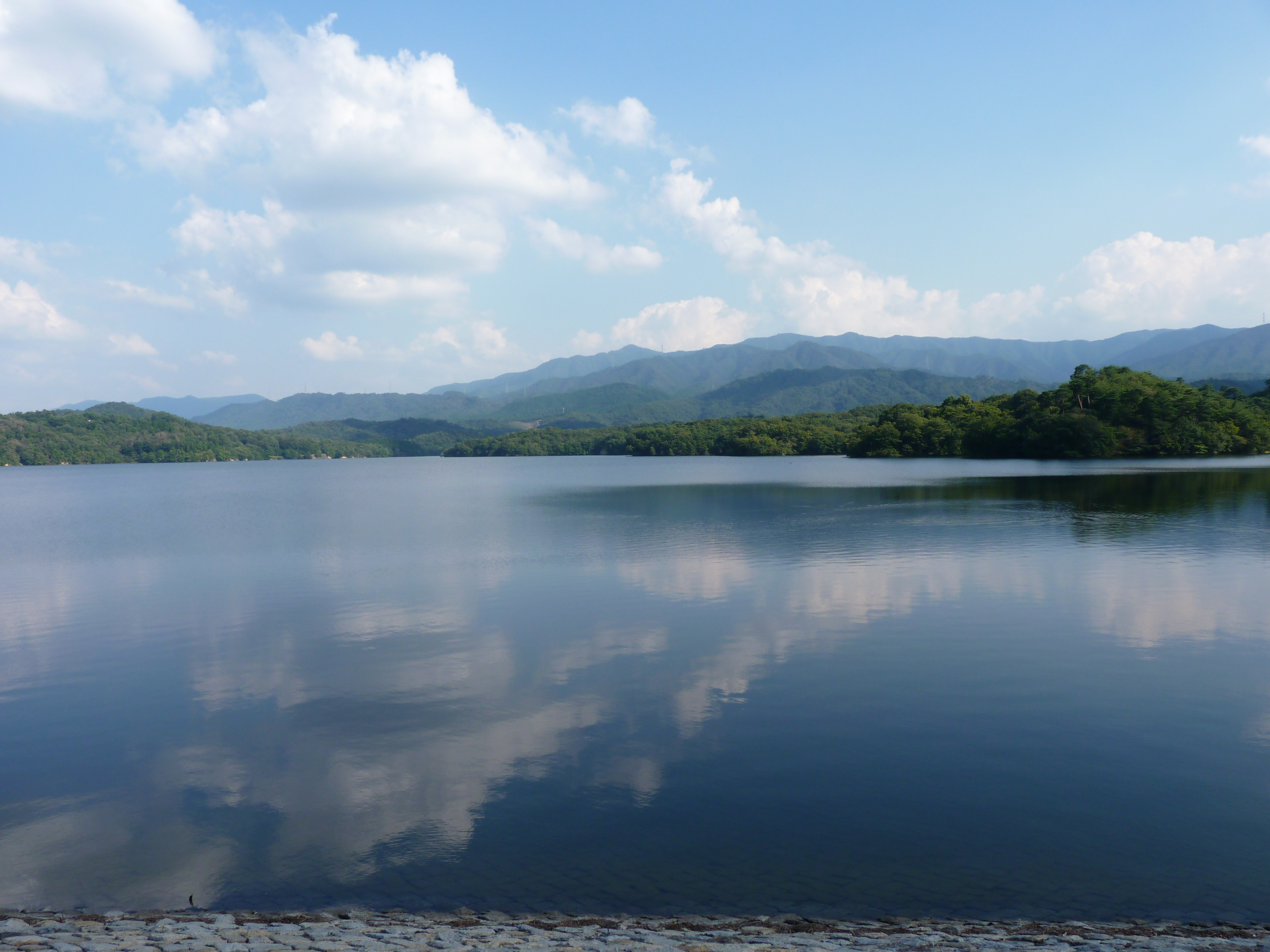
Manno lake

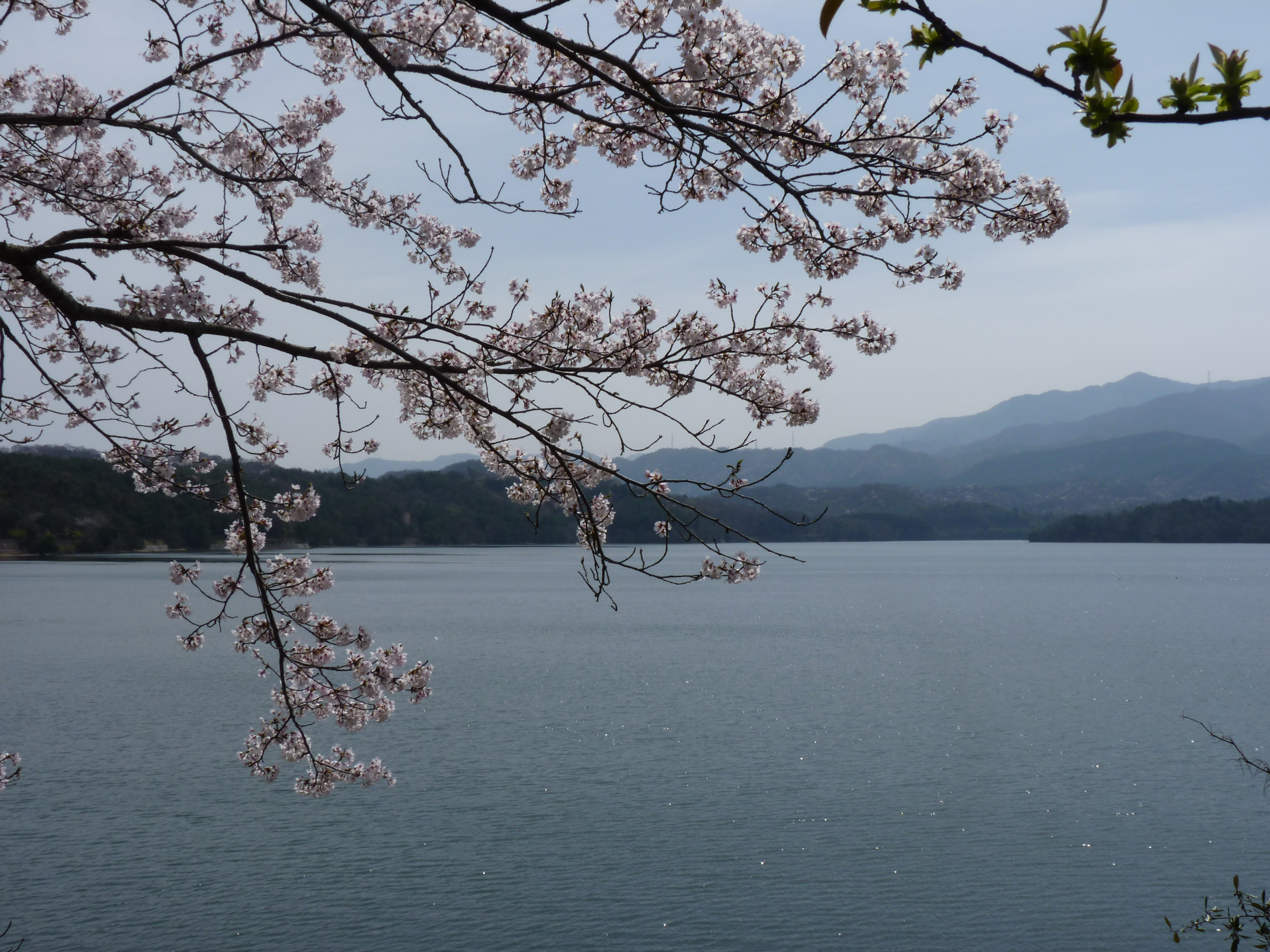
Manno Lake and Cherry blossoms

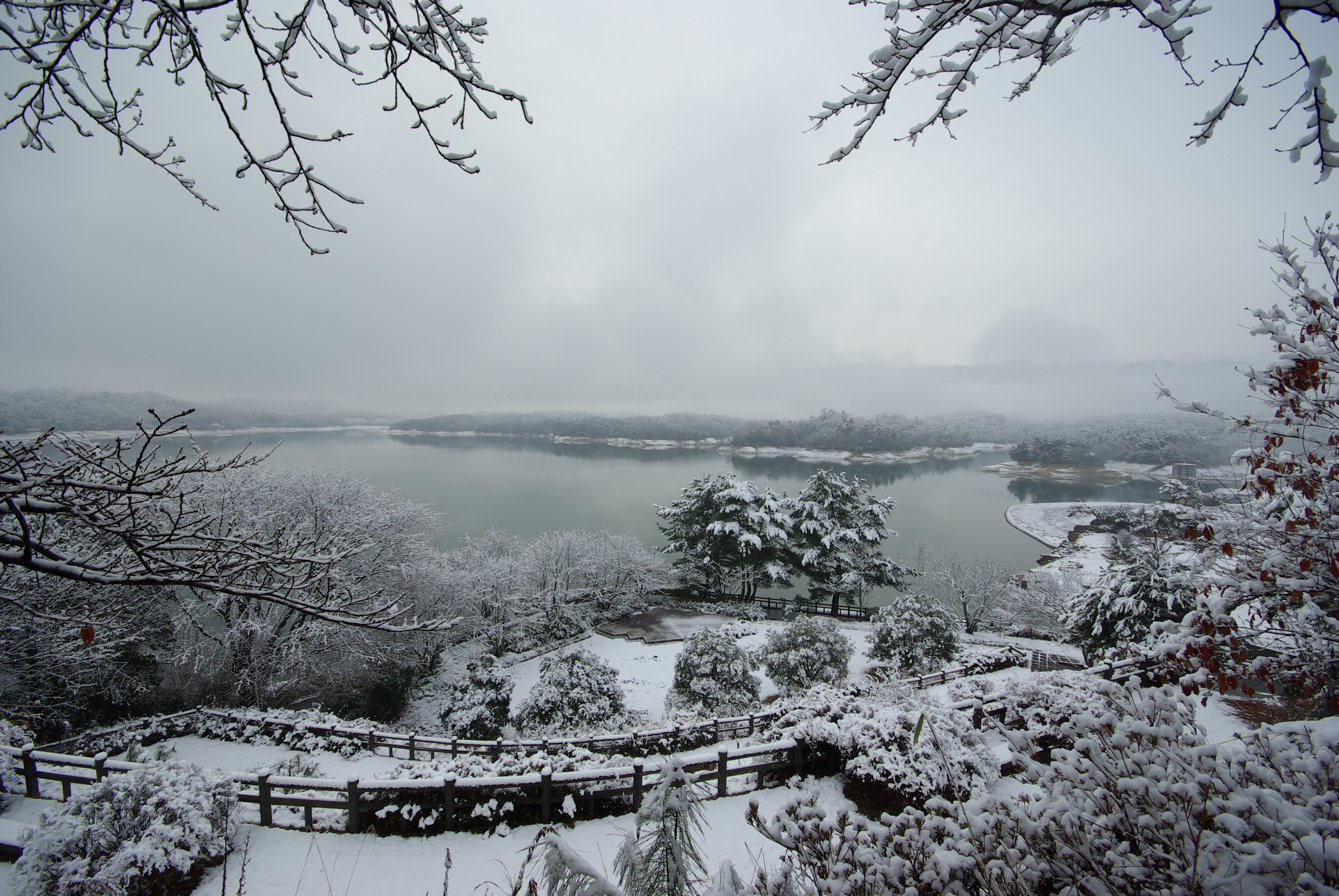
Snowy landscape at Manno Lake

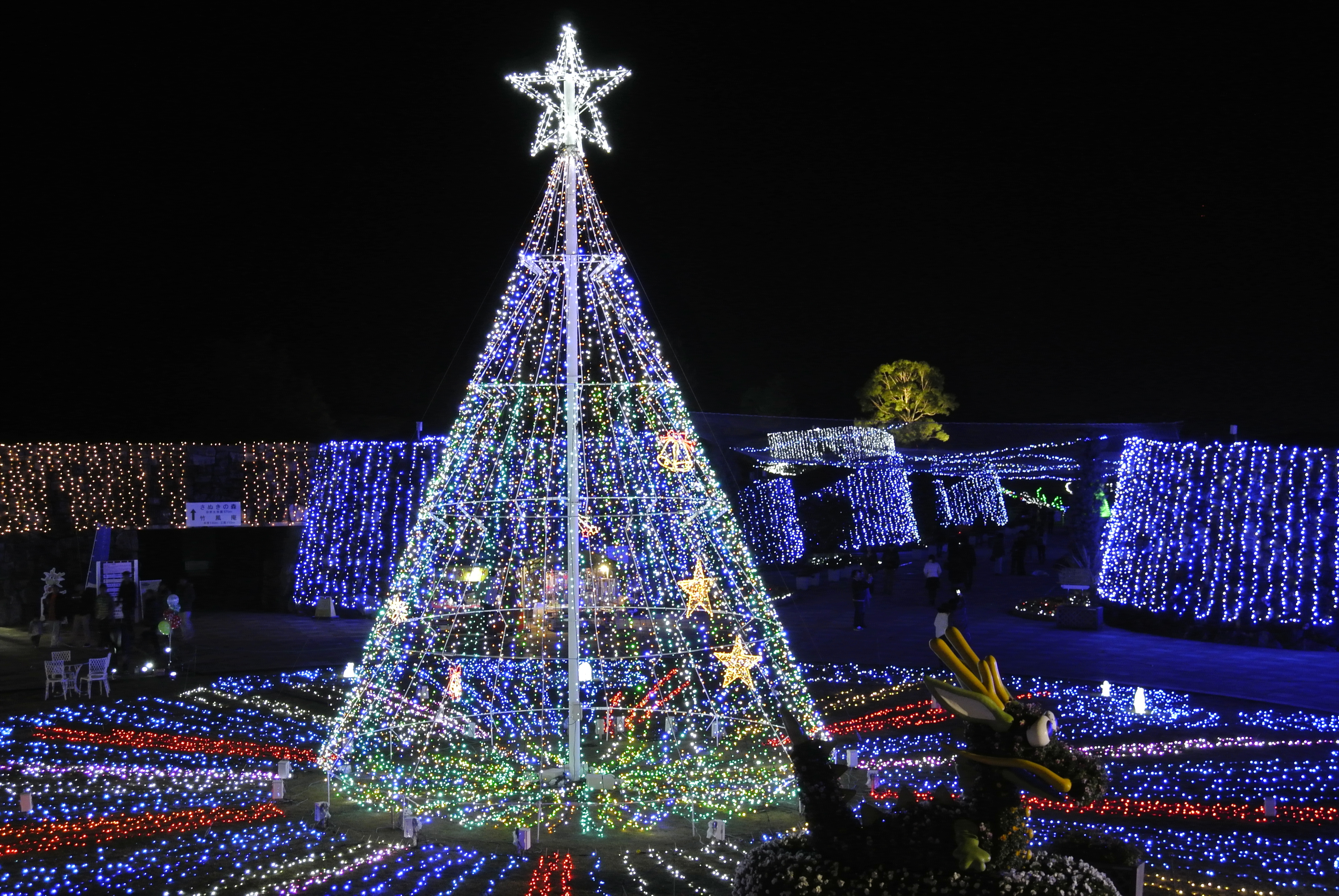
symbol tree

== Noted people from Mannō ==
- Yuji Terajima, manga artist
