= Ryōnan, Kagawa =

Dissolved municipality in Kagawa prefecture, Japan

Ryōnan (綾南町, Ryōnan-chō) was a town located in Ayauta District, Kagawa Prefecture, Japan.

As of 2003, the town had an estimated population of 19,239 and a density of 500.10 persons per km^{2}. The total area was 38.47 km^{2}.

On March 21, 2006, Ryōnan, along with the town of Ayakami (also from Ayauta District), was merged to create the town of Ayagawa.
