= Chūnan, Kagawa =

Chūnan 仲南町 ちゅうなんちょう
- Town
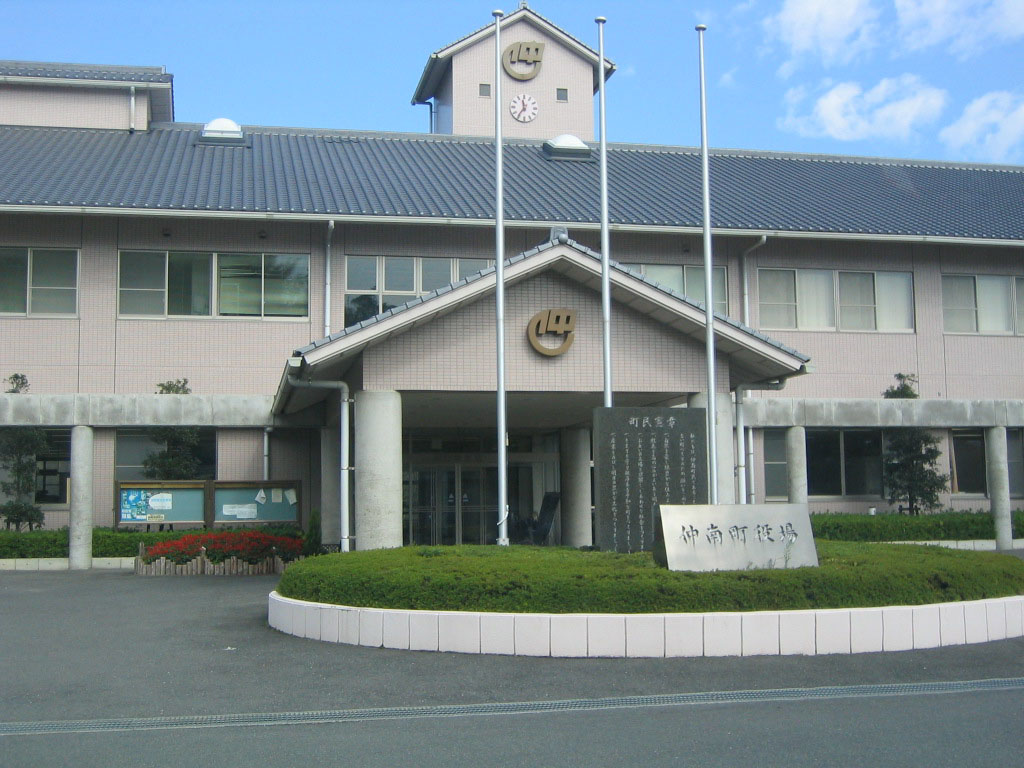
- Town Hall, Chūnan, Kagawa

- Flag Seal
- Interactive map of Chūnan
- Country: Japan
- Region: Shikoku
- Prefecture: Kagawa
- District: Nakatado
- Merged: March 20, 2006

Area
  - Total: 58.14 km^{2} (22.45 sq mi)

Population (2005)
  - Total: 4,653
  - Density: 80.03/km^{2} (207.3/sq mi)

Chūnan (仲南町, Chūnan-chō) was a town located in Nakatado District, Kagawa Prefecture, Japan.

As of 2003, the town had an estimated population of 4,681 and a density of 80.51 persons per km^{2}. The total area was 58.14 km^{2}.

On March 20, 2006, Chūnan, along with the town of Kotonami (also from Nakatado District), was merged into the expanded town of Mannō.
