= Kokubunji, Kagawa =

Dissolved municipality in Kagawa prefecture, Japan

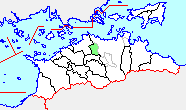
Kokubunji in Kagawa Prefecture

Kokubunji (国分寺町, Kokubunji-chō) was a town located in Ayauta District, Kagawa Prefecture, Japan.

As of 2003, the town had an estimated population of 23,743 and a density of 904.50 persons per km^{2}. The total area was 26.25 km^{2}.

On January 10, 2006, Kokubunji, along with the towns of Aji and Mure (both from Kita District), and the towns of Kagawa and Kōnan (both from Kagawa District), was merged into the expanded city of Takamatsu and no longer exists as an independent municipality.
