= Marugame =

Marugame 丸亀市
- City
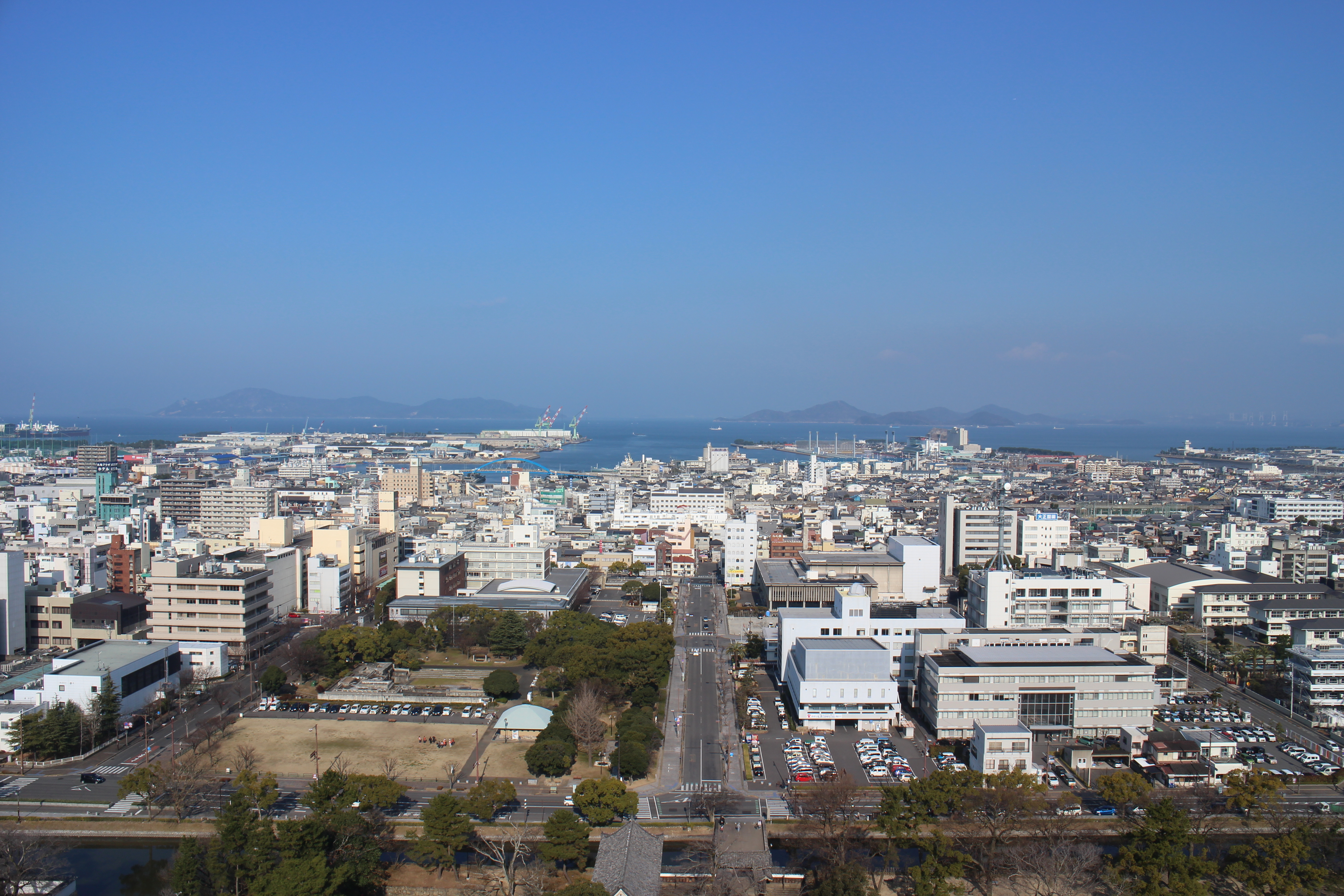
- View of downtown Marugame City, from Marugame Castle

- Flag Chapter

- Location in Japan
- Coordinates: 34°17′N 133°48′E
- Country: Japan
- Region: Shikoku
- Prefecture: Kagawa

Government
  - Mayor: Kyoji Matsunaga (from April 2021)

Area
  - Total: 111.79 km^{2} (43.16 sq mi)

Population (October 1, 2022)
  - Total: 108,541
  - Density: 970.94/km^{2} (2,514.7/sq mi)
- Time zone: UTC+09:00 (JST)
- City hall address: 2-3-1 Ōtemachi, Marugame-shi, Kagawa-ken 763-8501
- Website: Official website
- Symbols
- Flower: Satsuki azalea
- Tree: Myrica rubra

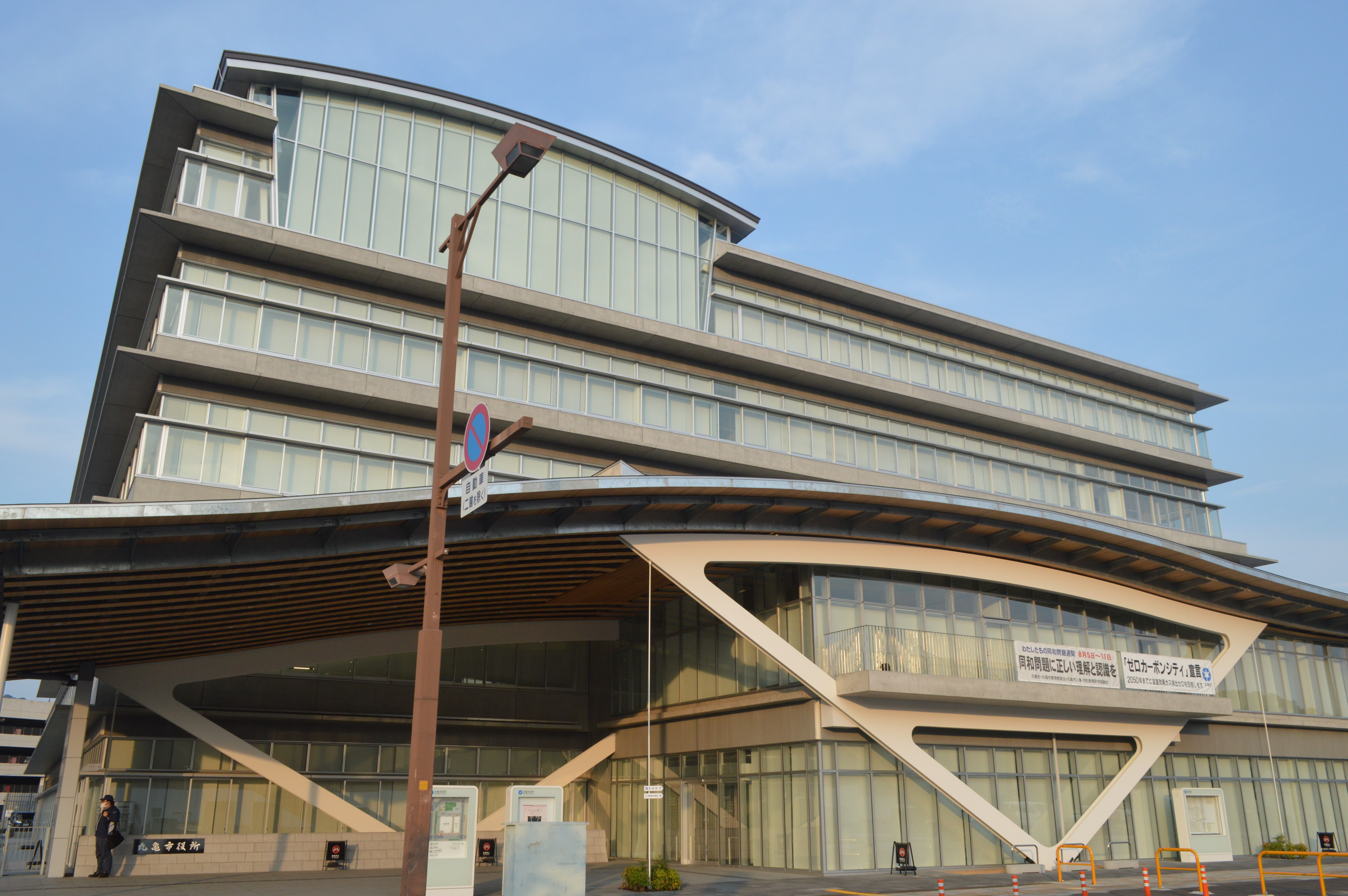
Marugame City Hall

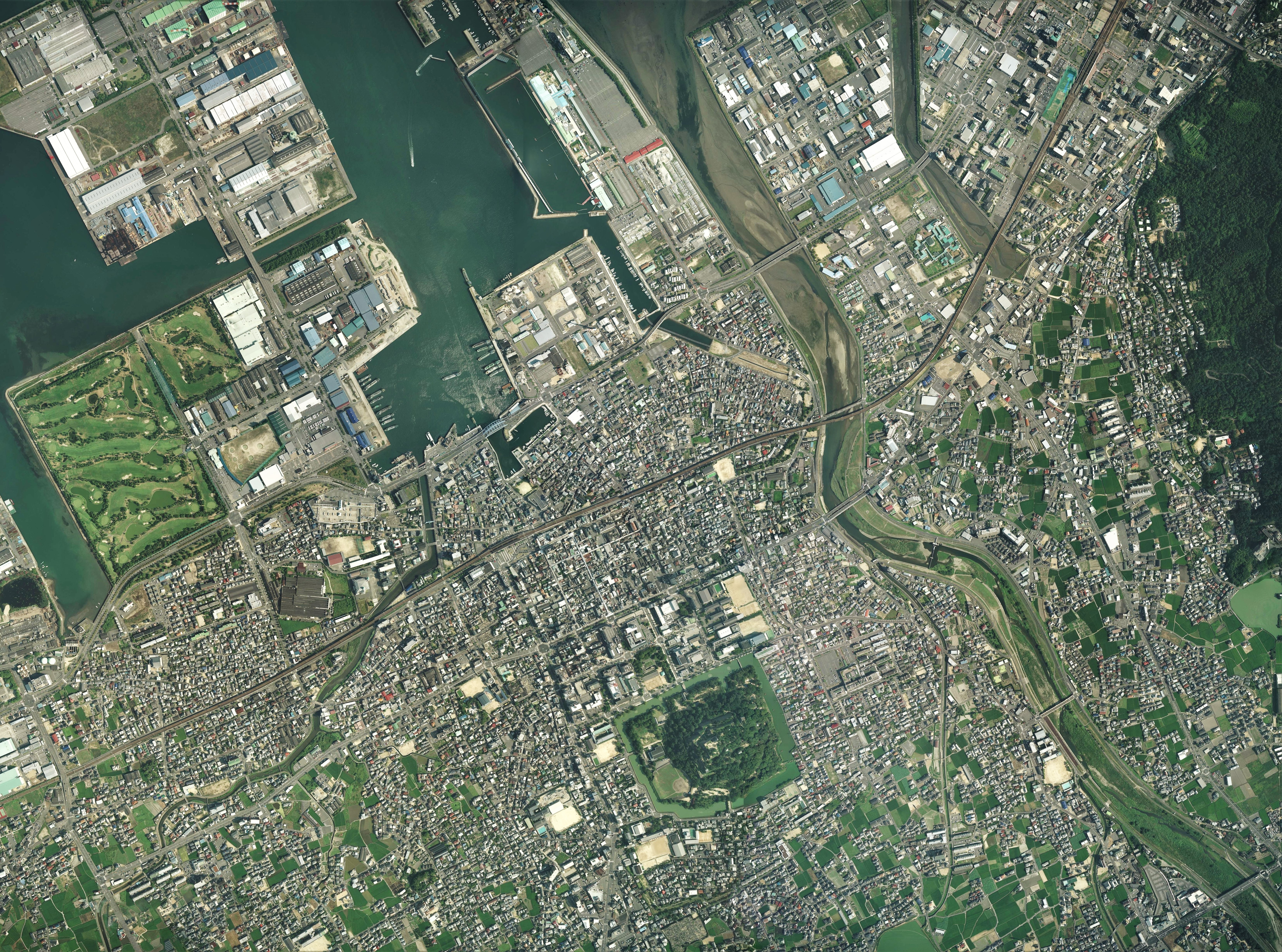
Aerial view of Marugame city center

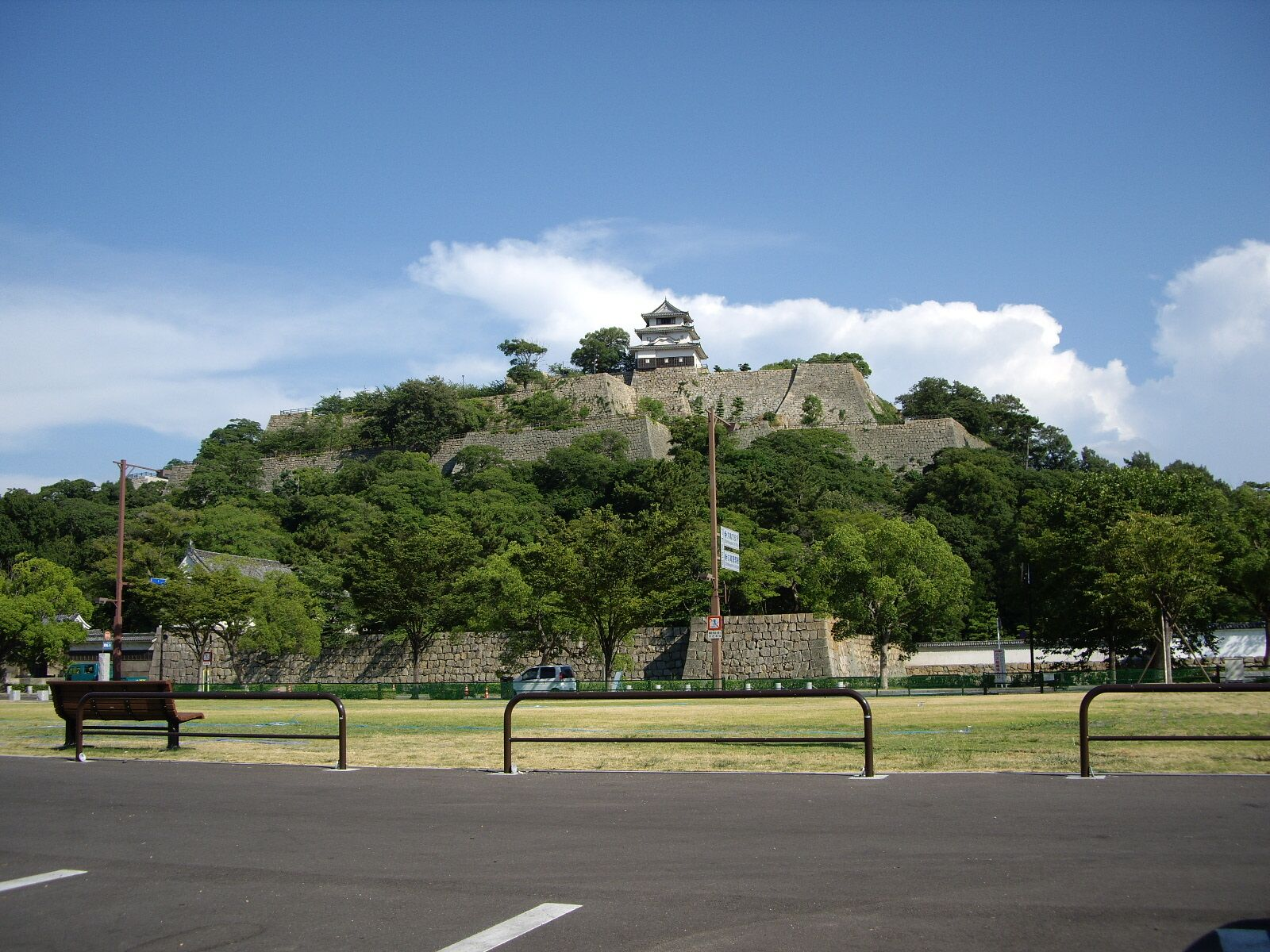
Marugame Castle

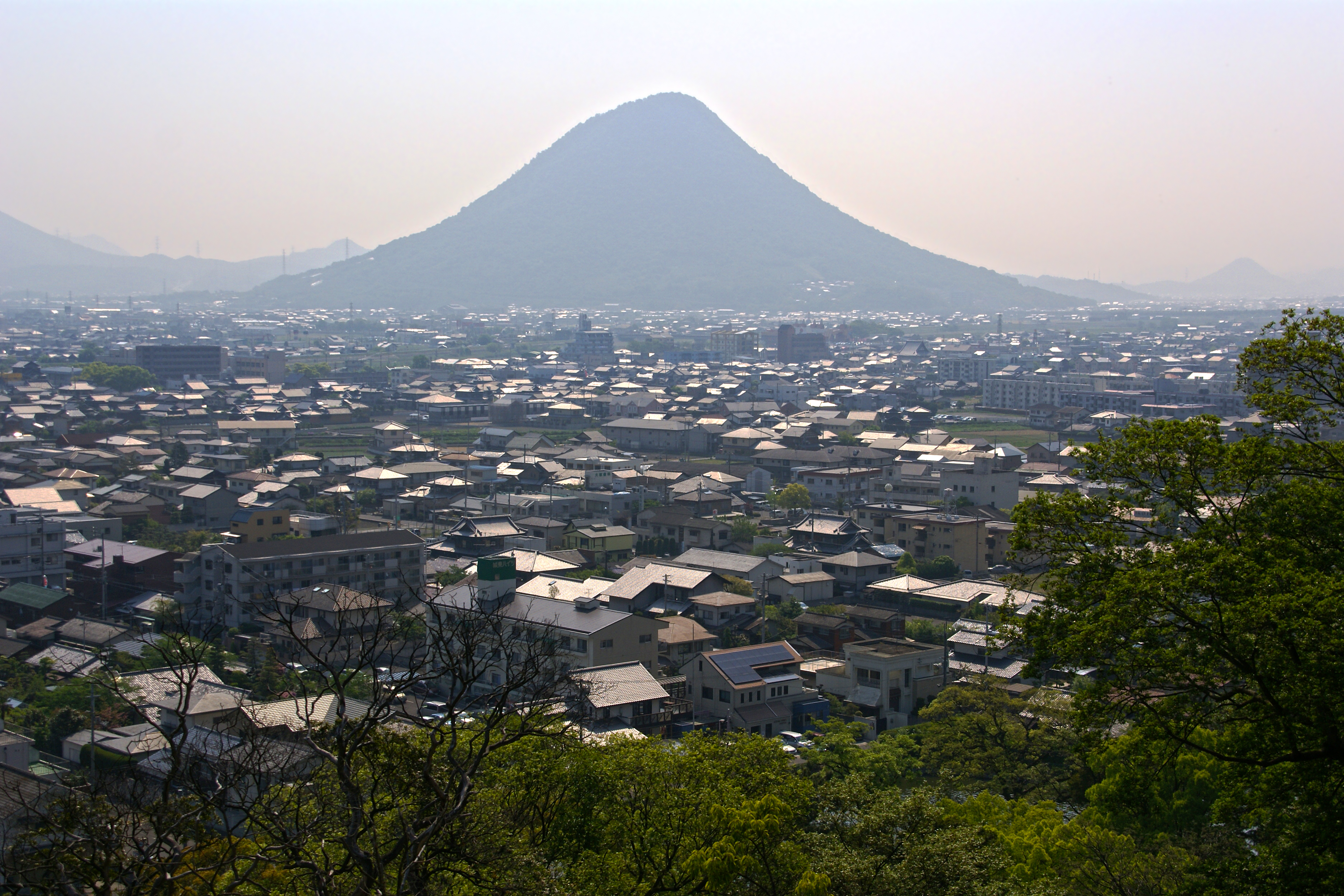
Sanuki Fuji

Marugame (丸亀市, Marugame-shi) is a city located in Kagawa Prefecture, Japan. As of 1 October 2022, the city had an estimated population of 108,541 in 46101 households and a population density of 970 persons per km^{2}. The total area of the city is 111.79 square kilometres (43.16 sq mi).

== Geography ==
Marugame is located in north-center Kagawa Prefecture, on the island of Shikoku, facing the Seto Inland Sea to the north. The city covers the northeastern part of the Marugame Plain and part of the Shiwaku Islands. As with many other cities and towns in Kagawa Prefecture, there are many reservoirs. The Doki River flows from north to south through the center of the city, and to the south is Mount Tsutsumi, also known as Hatoko Fuji, one of the "Sanuki Seven Fujis". Mount Iino, nicknamed Sanuki Fuji and located on the border between Marugame and Sakaide, is another of the "Sanuki Seven Fujis".

=== Neighbouring municipalities ===
Kagawa Prefecture

- Ayagawa
- Mannō
- Sakaide
- Tadotsu
- Utazu
- Zentsūji

=== Climate ===
Marugame has a humid subtropical climate (Köppen Cfa) characterized by warm summers and cool winters with light snowfall. The average annual temperature in Marugame is 15.7 °C. The average annual rainfall is 1439 mm, with September as the wettest month. The temperatures are highest on average in August, at around 26.6 °C, and lowest in January, at around 5.3 °C.

== Demographics ==
According to Japanese census data, the population of Marugame has recently plateaued after several decades of growth.

Historical population
Year	Pop.	±%
1950	87,271	—
1960	81,523	−6.6%
1970	78,263	−4.0%
1980	94,849	+21.2%
1990	101,253	+6.8%
2000	108,356	+7.0%
2010	110,473	+2.0%
2020	109,513	−0.9%

== History ==
The area of Marugame was part of ancient Sanuki Province and has been inhabited since ancient times, with many kofun burial mounds found within the city limits. From the Heian period onwards, it was noted as an entry point for pilgrims to the Kotohira-gū shrine. During the Edo Period, the area developed as the castle town for Marugame Domain, which was ruled for 210 years by the Kyōgoku clan. Following the Meiji restoration, the town of Marugame was established with the creation of the modern municipality system on February 15, 1890. It was elevated to city status on April 1, 1890, becoming the 53rd city in Japan. During the 1950s the southeast area of the city and some islands were amalgamated to form new parts of the city.

On March 22, 2005, the towns of Ayauta and Hanzan (both from Ayauta District) were merged into Marugame to create the current expanded city of Marugame.

- The former Ayauta was founded in 1959 with the merger of the villages of Kumatami and Okada. Kumatama was founded by the merger of the villages of Kurikuma and Tomikuma in 1951.
- The former Hanzan was founded in 1956 with the merger of the villages of Sakamoto and Hokunji.

== Government ==
Marugame has a mayor-council form of government with a directly elected mayor and a unicameral city council of 24 members. Marugame, together with Naoshima, contributes four members to the Kagawa Prefectural Assembly. In terms of national politics, the city is divided between the Kagawa 2nd district and the Kagawa 3rd district of the lower house of the Diet of Japan.

=== List of mayors of Marugame (from 1899 to present) ===
Name	Office Entered	Office Left
Motoyoshi Toyoda (豊田元良)	3 August 1899	8 January 1904
Aina Hasegawa (長谷川和愛)	18 June 1904	17 June 1910
Kenkichi Fujiyoshi (藤好乾吉)	8 June 1910	12 January 1915
Kenichi Saito (斎藤研一)	2 November 1915	1 June 1917
Tokutaro Higuchi (樋口德太郎)	15 September 1917	7 October 1920
Kiyoshi Hisano (久野廉)	3 June 1921	7 March 1923
Iwao Osuka (大須賀巖)	5 July 1923	4 July 1931
Kikuma Takaki (高木季熊)	17 November 1931	10 April 1934
Seizaburo Ogaza (大柏淸三郎)	25 July 1934	24 July 1942
Toshisuke Irie (入江俊輔)	25 July 1942	24 July 1946
Katsuhide Mihara (三原勝英)	26 April 1947	29 April 1963
Shigetoshi Horiie (堀家重俊)	30 April 1963	29 April 1991
Keisuke Katayama (片山圭之)	30 April 1991	29 April 2003
Tetsuji Arai (新井哲二)	30 April 2003	23 April 2013
Masaharu Kaji (梶正治)	24 April 2013	present

== Economy ==
Marugame has a mixed economy centered on agriculture (rice, vegetables, chicken, peaches) and manufacturing along a coastal belt of reclaimed land which contains a number of industrial parks, textile plants and shipyards. Traditionally, the city was noted for its production of uchiwa fans, claiming a 90% market share; however, due to mechanization and changes in fashion, only two workshops are left in the city. Due to its well-developed transportation network, industry is expanding, and the city is increasingly becoming a commuter town for neighboring Takamatsu.

In 2015, Imabari Shipbuilding announced the construction of a large dry dock capable of building world-class containerships in Marugame.

== Education ==
Marugame has 18 public elementary schools and eight public middle schools operated by the city government, and four public high schools operated by the Kagawa Prefectural Board of Education. In addition, there are one private middle school, two private high schools and two correspondence high schools. The prefecture also operates one middle school and one high school.

== Transportation ==
=== Railways ===
JR Shikoku - Yosan Line

- Marugame - Sanuki-Shioya

Takamatsu-Kotohira Electric Railroad - Kotohira Line

- Kurikuma - Okada

=== Highways ===
- Takamatsu Expressway
- National Route 11
- National Route 32
- National Route 319
- National Route 377
- National Route 438

== Sister cities ==
- Donostia / San Sebastián, Spain, since November 6, 1990
- Pasig, Philippines
- Willich, Germany, since July 6, 2023
- Zhangjiagang, Jiangsu, China, friendship city since May 28, 1990

== Local attractions ==
- Kaitenyama Kofun, National Historic Site
- Marugame Castle, National Historic Site and one of only 12 Japanese castles with original wooden tenshu (keeps) remaining.
- Marugame Genichiro-Inokuma Museum of Contemporary Art (MIMOCA), situated just east of the railway station, houses the works of Genichiro Inokuma, as well as playing host to many visiting exhibitions.
- Reoma World, a recreational facility with many attractions, two restaurants, a spa and hotel in the theme park
- Shiwaku Kinbansho, National Historic Site

=== Events ===
- Marugame Half Marathon - Occurring in early February, the race attracts thousands of runners each year. Held since 1947, the Asian record in the half marathon was set on the course by Kayoko Fukushi in 2006.

== Notable people from Marugame ==
- Yoshihiko Isozaki, politician
- Katsuyuki Motohiro, movie director
- Fumiko Saiga, judge on the International Criminal Court
- Toshio Yamauchi, politician
