= Hanzan, Kagawa =

Dissolved municipality in Ayauta district, Kagawa prefecture, Japan

Hanzan (飯山町, Hanzan-chō) was a town located in Ayauta District, Kagawa Prefecture, Japan.

As of 2003, the town had an estimated population of 17,183 and a density of 857.86 persons per km^{2}. The total area was 20.03 km^{2}.

On March 22, 2005, Hanzan, along with the town of Ayauta (also from Ayauta District), was merged into the expanded city of Marugame and no longer exists as an independent municipality.
