= Yoshio Kimura (politician) =

Japanese politician

- 木村 義雄
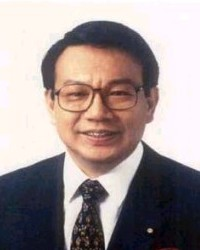
- Official portrait, 2002

Member of the House of Councillors
- Incumbent
- Assumed office 2 February 2026
- Preceded by: Shigeharu Aoyama
- Constituency: National PR
- In office 29 July 2013 – 28 July 2019
- Constituency: National PR

Member of the House of Representatives
- In office 8 July 1986 – 21 July 2009
- Preceded by: Toshiichi Fuke
- Succeeded by: Yuichiro Tamaki
- Constituency: Kagawa 1st (1986–1996); Kagawa 2nd (1996–2009)

Member of the Kagawa Prefectural Assembly
- In office 1983–1986

Personal details
- Born: 17 April 1948 (age 78) Tsuda, Kagawa, Japan
- Party: Liberal Democratic
- Education: Chuo University

Yoshio Kimura (木村義雄, Kimura Yoshio; born 17 April 1948) is a Japanese politician of the Liberal Democratic Party and a member of the House of Councillors in the Diet (national legislature).

A native of Sanuki, Kagawa and graduate of Chuo University, Kimura worked at Sumitomo Bank from 1972 to 1975. After serving in the Kagawa Prefectural Assembly for one term, he was elected to the House of Representatives for the first time in 1986. He was a Senior Vice-Minister of Health, Labor and Welfare. Kimura also served in the House of Representatives between 1986 and 2009 as a member of the Kagawa old 1st district and Kagawa 2nd district.

Kimura ran in the national PR block in the 2022 House of Councillors election, but was defeated. In February 2026, he entered the House of Councillors as the next candidate on the LDP list, after Shigeharu Aoyama resigned to contest the 2026 general election.
