= Ayagawa, Kagawa =

Ayagawa 綾川町
- Town
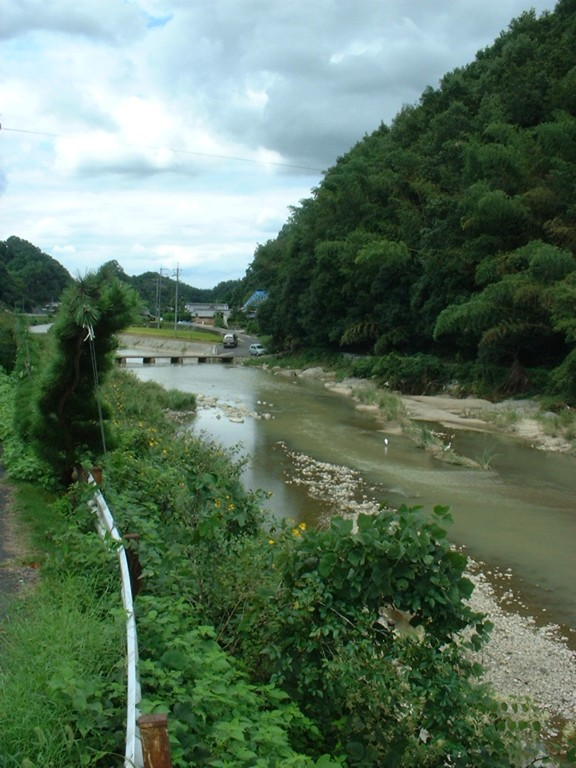
- River near Ayagawa and Ayakami

- Flag Chapter
- Interactive map of Ayagawa
- Location in Japan
- Coordinates: 34°15′N 133°55′E
- Country: Japan
- Region: Shikoku
- Prefecture: Kagawa
- District: Ayauta
- Established: March 21, 2006

Government
  - Mayor: Taketoshi Maeda.

Area
  - Total: 109.75 km^{2} (42.37 sq mi)

Population (October 1, 2022)
  - Total: 23,427
  - Density: 213.46/km^{2} (552.85/sq mi)
- Time zone: UTC+09:00 (JST)
- City hall address: 299 Takinomiya, Ayagaw-shoa, Ayauta-gun, Kagawa-ken 761-2305
- Climate: Cfa
- Website: Official website

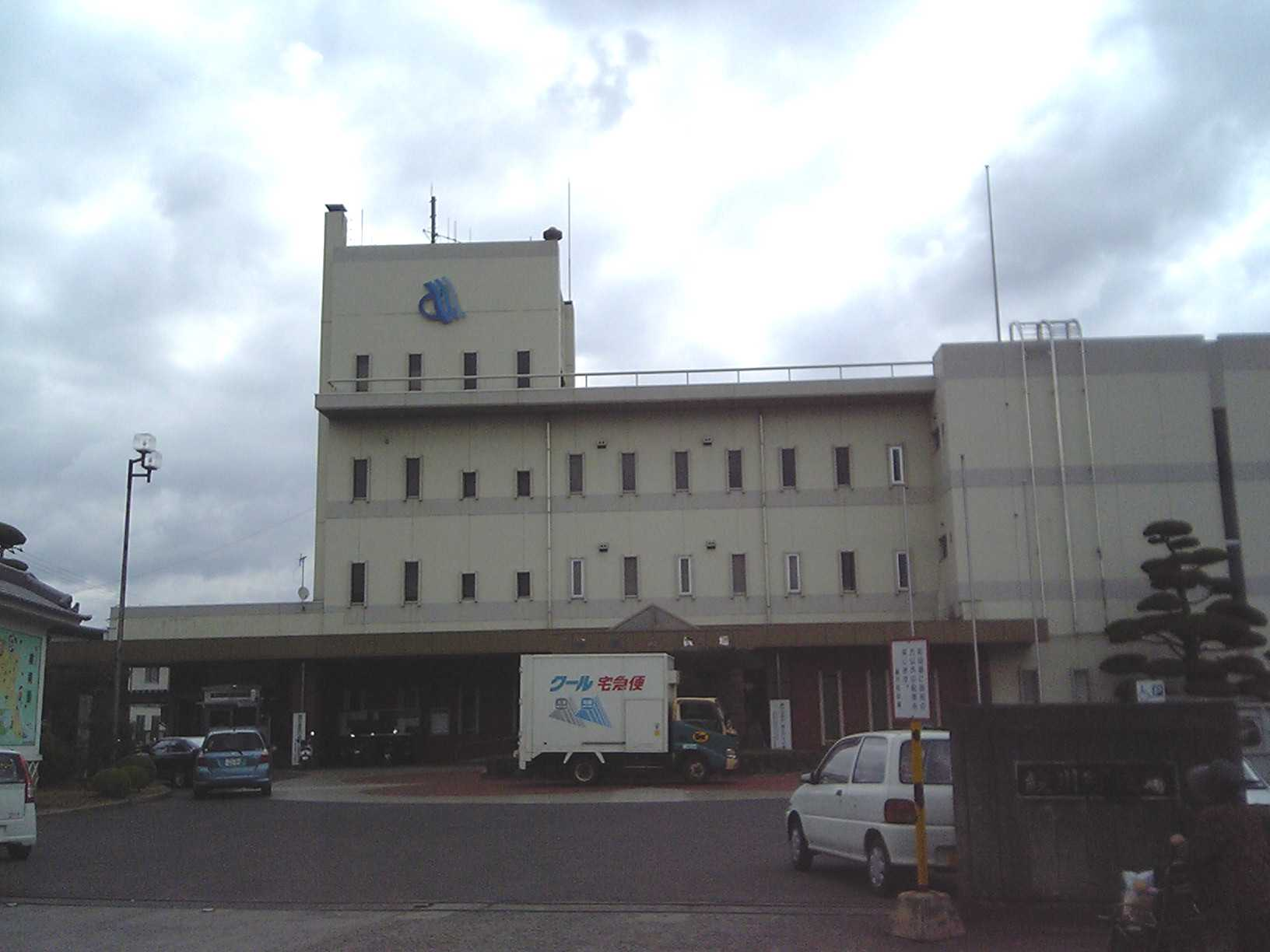
Ayagawa Town Hall

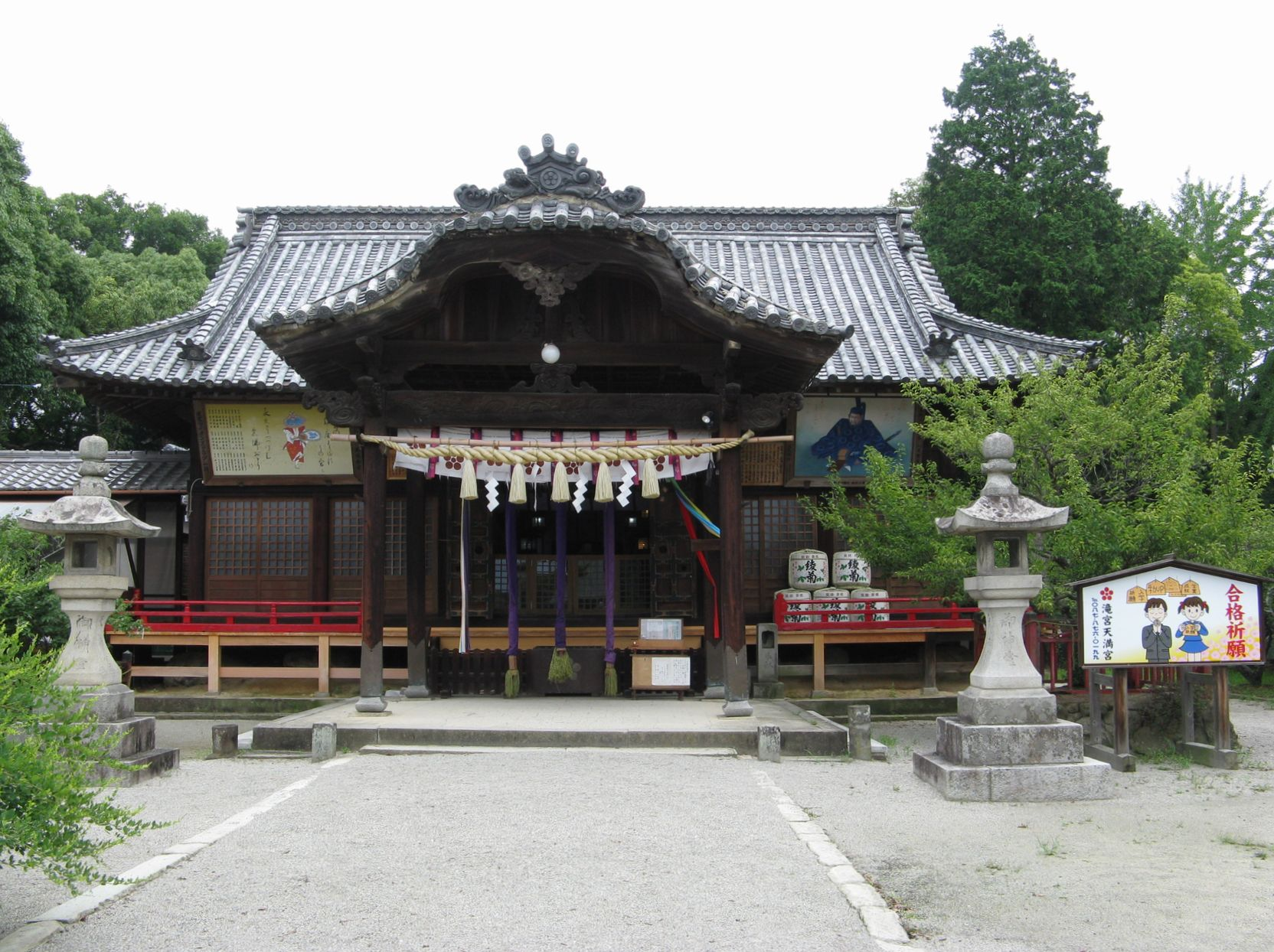
Takigawa Tenman-gū

Ayagawa (綾川町, Ayagawa-chō) is a town located in Ayauta District, Kagawa Prefecture, Japan. As of 1 October 2022, the town had an estimated population of 23,427 in 10108 households and a population density of 960 persons per km^{2}. The total area of the town is 109.75 square kilometres (42.37 sq mi).

== Geography ==
Ayagawa is located almost in the center of Kagawa Prefecture, and is bordered by the Sanuki Mountains to the south.

=== Neighbouring municipalities ===
Kagawa Prefecture

- Mannō
- Marugame
- Sakaide
- Takamatsu

=== Climate ===
Ayagawa has a humid subtropical climate (Köppen climate classification Cfa) with hot, humid summers, and cool winters. Some rain falls throughout the year, but the months from May to September have the heaviest rain. The average annual temperature in Ayagawa is 15.4 °C (59.7 °F). The average annual rainfall is 1,212.3 mm (47.73 in) with September as the wettest month. The temperatures are highest on average in August, at around 27.3 °C (81.1 °F), and lowest in January, at around 4.5 °C (40.1 °F). The highest temperature ever recorded in Ayagawa was 37.7 °C (99.9 °F) on 11 August 2013; the coldest temperature ever recorded was −6.9 °C (19.6 °F) on 17 February 1986.

Climate data for Ayagawa (1991−2020 normals, extremes 1978−present)
| Month | Jan | Feb | Mar | Apr | May | Jun | Jul | Aug | Sep | Oct | Nov | Dec | Year |
|---|---|---|---|---|---|---|---|---|---|---|---|---|---|
| Record high °C (°F) | 18.5 (65.3) | 24.4 (75.9) | 27.2 (81.0) | 30.2 (86.4) | 33.3 (91.9) | 35.5 (95.9) | 37.6 (99.7) | 37.7 (99.9) | 36.6 (97.9) | 32.4 (90.3) | 26.4 (79.5) | 21.9 (71.4) | 37.7 (99.9) |
| Mean daily maximum °C (°F) | 9.2 (48.6) | 10.1 (50.2) | 13.9 (57.0) | 19.9 (67.8) | 25.0 (77.0) | 27.6 (81.7) | 31.6 (88.9) | 33.0 (91.4) | 28.7 (83.7) | 22.9 (73.2) | 17.1 (62.8) | 11.6 (52.9) | 20.9 (69.6) |
| Daily mean °C (°F) | 4.5 (40.1) | 5.0 (41.0) | 8.2 (46.8) | 13.6 (56.5) | 18.6 (65.5) | 22.3 (72.1) | 26.4 (79.5) | 27.3 (81.1) | 23.2 (73.8) | 17.3 (63.1) | 11.6 (52.9) | 6.7 (44.1) | 15.4 (59.7) |
| Mean daily minimum °C (°F) | 0.0 (32.0) | −0.1 (31.8) | 2.5 (36.5) | 7.4 (45.3) | 12.5 (54.5) | 17.8 (64.0) | 22.2 (72.0) | 22.8 (73.0) | 18.9 (66.0) | 12.5 (54.5) | 6.5 (43.7) | 1.9 (35.4) | 10.4 (50.7) |
| Record low °C (°F) | −6.4 (20.5) | −6.9 (19.6) | −4.7 (23.5) | −2.5 (27.5) | 1.7 (35.1) | 8.5 (47.3) | 14.0 (57.2) | 15.3 (59.5) | 7.4 (45.3) | 1.5 (34.7) | −1.2 (29.8) | −4.9 (23.2) | −6.9 (19.6) |
| Average precipitation mm (inches) | 41.0 (1.61) | 48.0 (1.89) | 85.2 (3.35) | 79.5 (3.13) | 111.4 (4.39) | 164.4 (6.47) | 168.8 (6.65) | 105.7 (4.16) | 169.9 (6.69) | 120.3 (4.74) | 62.9 (2.48) | 52.2 (2.06) | 1,212.3 (47.73) |
| Average precipitation days (≥ 1.0 mm) | 7.1 | 7.4 | 9.9 | 9.7 | 8.8 | 11.3 | 9.6 | 7.7 | 9.5 | 8.3 | 7.6 | 8.0 | 104.9 |
| Mean monthly sunshine hours | 131.2 | 139.2 | 167.5 | 190.5 | 202.5 | 149.6 | 189.8 | 217.0 | 152.7 | 159.0 | 140.9 | 129.0 | 1,968.2 |
Source: Japan Meteorological Agency

== Demographics ==
Per Japanese census data, the population of Ayagawa in 2020 is 22,693 people. Ayagawa has been conducting censuses since 1920.

Historical population
| Year | Pop. | ±% |
|---|---|---|
| 1920 | 22,495 | — |
| 1925 | 22,302 | −0.9% |
| 1930 | 22,654 | +1.6% |
| 1935 | 22,483 | −0.8% |
| 1940 | 22,031 | −2.0% |
| 1945 | 29,409 | +33.5% |
| 1950 | 29,009 | −1.4% |
| 1955 | 27,844 | −4.0% |
| 1960 | 26,000 | −6.6% |
| 1965 | 23,763 | −8.6% |
| 1970 | 22,551 | −5.1% |
| 1975 | 22,556 | +0.0% |
| 1980 | 24,017 | +6.5% |
| 1985 | 24,644 | +2.6% |
| 1990 | 24,509 | −0.5% |
| 1995 | 25,421 | +3.7% |
| 2000 | 26,205 | +3.1% |
| 2005 | 25,628 | −2.2% |
| 2010 | 24,632 | −3.9% |
| 2015 | 23,610 | −4.1% |
| 2020 | 22,693 | −3.9% |
Ayagawa population statistics

== History ==
The area of Ayagawa was part of ancient Sanuki Province. There're over 60 kofun burial mounds and numerous pottery kiln sites from the Kofun and Nara periods within the town borders. During the Edo Period, the town area was part of the holdings of Takamatsu Domain. With the creation of the modern municipalities system on February 15, 1890, the area was divided into villages within Ayauta District, Kagawa. The village of Ayakami (綾上村) was created from the merger of four villages in 1954 and raised to town status in 1962. The town of Ryōnan (綾南町) was likewise founded in 1954 from the merger of four villages. The town of Ayagawa was founded on March 21, 2006, from the merger of the towns of Ayakami and Ryōnan.

== Government ==
Ayagawa has a mayor-council form of government with a directly elected mayor and a unicameral town council of 16 members. Ayagawa contributes one member to the Kagawa Prefectural Assembly. In terms of national politics, the town is part of Kagawa 2nd district of the lower house of the Diet of Japan.

== Economy ==
The local economy is heavily centered on agriculture. The town also claims to be the "birthplace of Sanuki udon" noodles, which were taught to a local by the famed Buddhist priest Kūkai, who brought the dish to Japan from Tang China to his parents in his hometown of Takinomiya, which is now within the town limits.

== Education ==
Ayagawa has five public elementary schools and one public middle school operated by the town government, and one public high school operated by the Kagawa Prefectural Board of Education. There is also one private high school.

== Transportation ==
=== Railways ===
Takamatsu-Kotohira Electric Railroad - Kotoden Kotohira Line

- Kazashigaoka - Hatada - Sue - Ayagawa - Takinomiya - Hayuka

=== Highways ===
- National Route 32
- National Route 377

== Local attractions ==
- Takinomiya Tenman-gū, noted Shinto shrine
