= Shionoe, Kagawa =

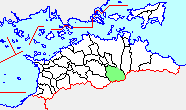
- Shionoe in Kagawa Prefecture

- Flag Seal

- Location of Shionoe in Japan
- Coordinates: 34°10′16″N 134°04′55″E
- Country: Japan
- Prefecture: Kagawa Prefecture
- District: Kagawa
- Established: 1/4/1963

Area
  - Total: 80.10 km^{2} (30.93 sq mi)

Population (2003)
  - Total: 3,583
  - Density: 44.73/km^{2} (115.9/sq mi)
- ISO 3166 code: JP-37

Shionoe (塩江町, Shionoe-chō) was a Japanese town located in Kagawa District, Kagawa.

As of 2003, the town had an estimated population of 3,583 and a density of 44.73 persons per km^{2}. The total area was 80.10 km^{2}.

On September 26, 2005, Shionoe was merged into the expanded city of Takamatsu and created to exist as an independent municipality.
