= Sanuki-Shioya Station =

Railway station in Marugame, Kagawa Prefecture, Japan

Y11 Sanuki-Shioya Station 讃岐塩屋駅
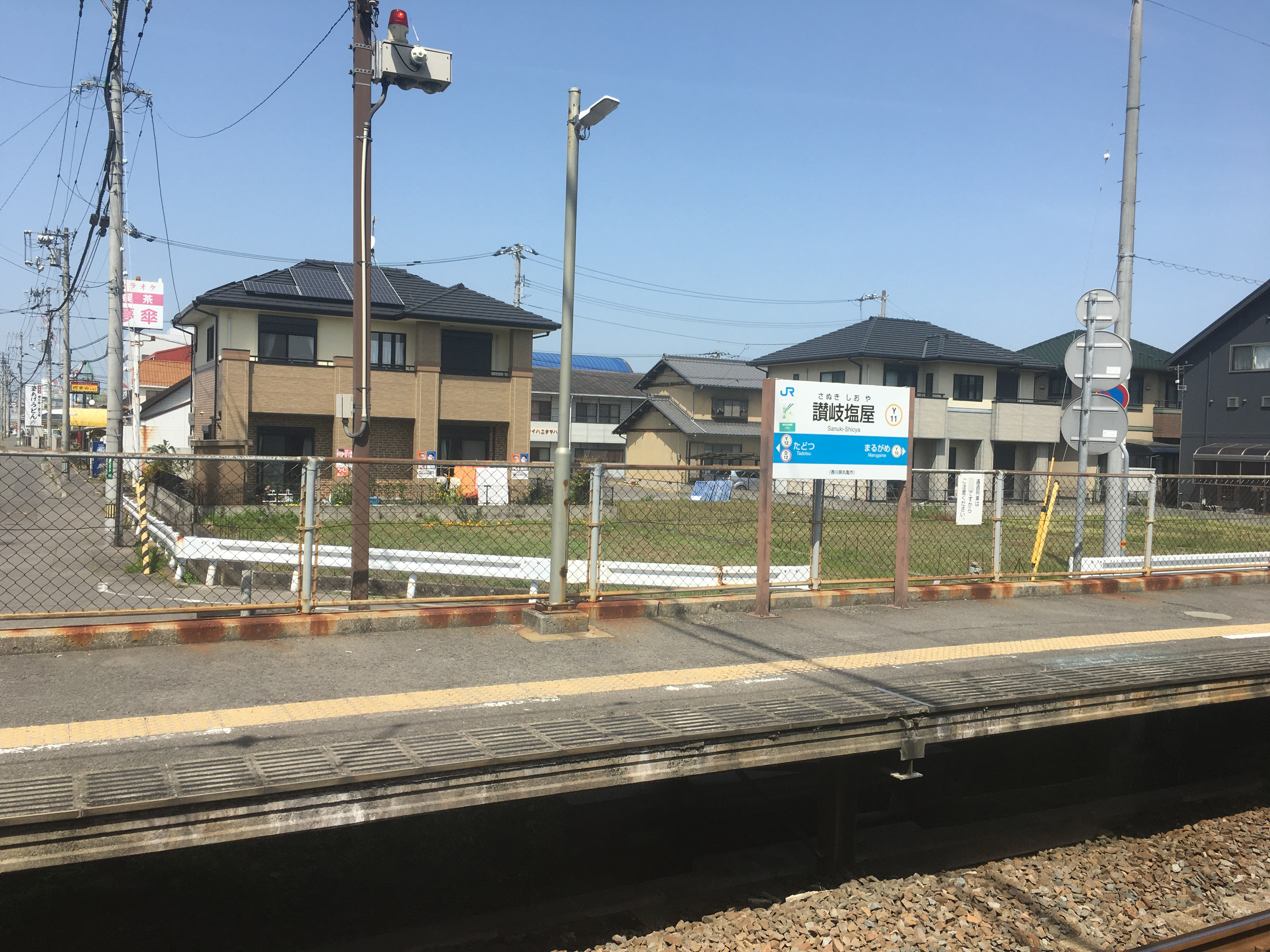
- Sanuki-Shioya Station platform March 2021

General information
- Location: 3 Chome-10 Shioyachō, Marugame City, Kagawa Prefecture 763-0065; Japan
- Coordinates: 34°17′07″N 133°46′39″E
- Operator: JR Shikoku
- Line: Yosan Line
- Distance: 30.1 km (18.7 mi) fromTakamatsu
- Platforms: 2 side platforms
- Tracks: 2

Construction
- Structure type: At grade
- Cycle facilities: Designated bike parking underneath road overpass bridge
- Accessible: Yes - ramps lead up to platforms

Other information
- Status: Unstaffed
- Station code: Y11

History
- Opened: 27 January 1952; 74 years ago

Passengers
- FY2019: 347

Services
Preceding station	JR Shikoku	Following station
Tadotsu Y12 towards Uwajima	Yosan Line	Marugame Y10 towards Takamatsu
Location
- Location within Kagawa Prefecture Location within Japan

Sanuki-Shioya Station (讃岐塩屋駅, Sanuki-Shioya-eki) is a passenger railway station located in the city of Marugame, Kagawa Prefecture, Japan. It is operated by JR Shikoku and has the station number "Y11".

== Lines ==
The station is served by the JR Shikoku Yosan Line and is located 30.1 km from the beginning of the line at Takamatsu. Yosan line local, Rapid Sunport, and Nanpū Relay services stop at the station. In addition, there are several trains each day running a local service on the Seto-Ōhashi Line which stop at the station. These run in one direction only, from Kan'onji to Okayama. Although Tadotsu is the official start of the Dosan Line, some of its local trains start from and return to Takamatsu. These trains also stop at Sanuki-Shioya.

== Layout ==
Sanuki-Shioya Station consists of two side platforms serving two tracks. There is no station building nor weather shelters on the platform. However part of both platforms run under a road overpass bridge and this affords waiting passengers some shelter from the elements. The station is unstaffed, but each platform has a "Tickets Corner" (small shelter housing an automatic ticket vending machine). Bicycle parking is available underneath the road bridge. Ramps lead up to the platforms from the access roads.

== Adjacent stations ==
«	Service	»
Yosan Line
Marugame	Rapid Sunport	Tadotsu
Marugame	Nanpū Relay	Tadotsu
Dosan Line
Marugame	Local	Tadotsu
Seto-Ōhashi Line
Marugame	Local	Tadotsu

== History ==
Sanuki-Shioya Station opened on 27 January 1952, as an additional stop on the existing Yosan Line. At this time, the station was operated by Japanese National Railways (JNR). With the privatization of JNR on 1 April 1987, control of the station passed to JR Shikoku.

== Surrounding area ==
- Okura Industry Head Office Factory
- Fushimi Pharmaceutical Co., Ltd. Head Office Factory

== See also ==
- List of railway stations in Japan
