= Kagawa, Kagawa =

Dissolved municipality in Kagawa prefecture, Japan

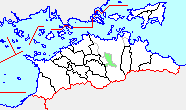
Kagawa in Kagawa Prefecture

Kagawa (香川町, Kagawa-chō) was a town located in Kagawa District, Kagawa Prefecture, Japan.

As of 2003, the town had an estimated population of 24,236 and a density of 886.79/km^{2} (2,296.8/sq mi). The total area was 27.33 km^{2} (10.55 sq mi).

On January 10, 2006, Kagawa, along with the towns of Aji and Mure (both from Kita District), the town of Kōnan (also from Kagawa District), and the town of Kokubunji (from Ayauta District), was merged into the expanded city of Takamatsu and no longer exists as an independent municipality.
