= Mure, Kagawa =

Dissolved municipality in Kagawa prefecture, Japan

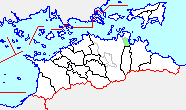
Mure in Kagawa Prefecture

Mure (牟礼町, Mure-chō) was a town located in Kita District, Kagawa Prefecture, Japan. The north and south of the town are hilly; the center is flat and suitable for housing development.

As of 2003, the town had an estimated population of 18,108 and a density of 1,098.79 persons per km^{2}. The total area was 16.48 km^{2}.

On January 10, 2006, Mure, along with the town of Aji (also from Kita District), the towns of Kagawa and Kōnan (both from Kagawa District), and the town of Kokubunji (from Ayauta District), was merged into the expanded city of Takamatsu and no longer exists as an independent municipality.

The town tree was the eucalyptus, and the town flower the camellia. These symbols represent ambition, good luck, longevity and positive relationships.

Mure had sister city relationships with Mure, Nagano and has an active relationship with Elberton, Georgia, United States.
