= Ayauta District, Kagawa =

District in Kagawa Prefecture, Japan

Coordinates: 34.219913°N 133.944991°E

Ayauta District in Kagawa Prefecture

Ayauta District (綾歌郡, Ayauta-gun) is a district located in Kagawa Prefecture, Japan.

As of the Takamatsu merger but using 2000 population data, the district has an estimated population of 41,598 and a density of 353 persons per km^{2}. The total area is 117.74 km^{2}.

== Towns and villages ==
- Ayagawa
- Utazu

== Mergers ==
- On March 22, 2005, the towns of Ayauta and Hanzan merged into the expanded city of Marugame.
- On January 10, 2006, the town of Kokubunji, along with the towns of Mure and Aji, both from Kita District, and the towns of Kagawa and Kōnan, both from Kagawa District merged into the expanded city of Takamatsu.
- On March 21, 2006, the towns of Ayakami and Ryōnan merged to form the new town of Ayagawa.
