= Kōnan, Kagawa =

Town in Kagawa, Japan

Coordinates: 34°14′1.7″N 134°2′41.4″E

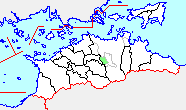
Kōnan in Kagawa Prefecture

Kōnan (香南町, Kōnan-chō) was a town located in Kagawa District, Kagawa Prefecture, Japan. As of 2003, it had an estimated population of 7,938 and a population density of 539.27 persons per km^{2}. The total area was 14.72 km^{2}.

On January 10, 2006, Kōnan, along with the towns of Aji and Mure (both from Kita District), the town of Kagawa (also from Kagawa District), and the town of Kokubunji (from Ayauta District), was merged into the expanded city of Takamatsu. It thus no longer exists as an independent municipality.
