= Aji, Kagawa =

Former town in Japan

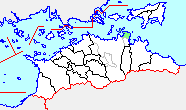
Aji in Kagawa Prefecture

Aji (庵治町, Aji-chō) was a town located in Kita District, Kagawa Prefecture, Japan. It is currently part of the city of Takamatsu.

Local attractions include the coastal Shirobana Park, which has featured unique stone sculptures with a view of the Seto Inland Sea since 1994. In 2016, the mountaintop Aji Ryuozan Park opened with its own sculpture forest and square, as well as an observation deck designed by Dutch artist John Körmeling.

== History ==
As of 2003, the town had an estimated to have population of 6,392 and a population density of 403.79/km^{2} (1,045.8/sq mi). The total area was 15.83 km^{2} (6.11 sq mi).

On January 10, 2006, Aji, along with the town of and Mure (also from Kita District), the towns of Kagawa and Kōnan (both from Kagawa District), and the town of Kokubunji (from Ayauta District), was merged into the expanded city of Takamatsu and no longer exists as an independent municipality.

== In popular culture ==
Aji was the main filming location of a Japanese hit movie Crying Out Love, In the Center of the World. When the movie was filmed, this town was chosen as the location where the protagonists lived in high school days.
