= Kita District, Kagawa =

District in Kagawa Prefecture, Japan

Coordinates: 34°14′17″N 134°08′06″E

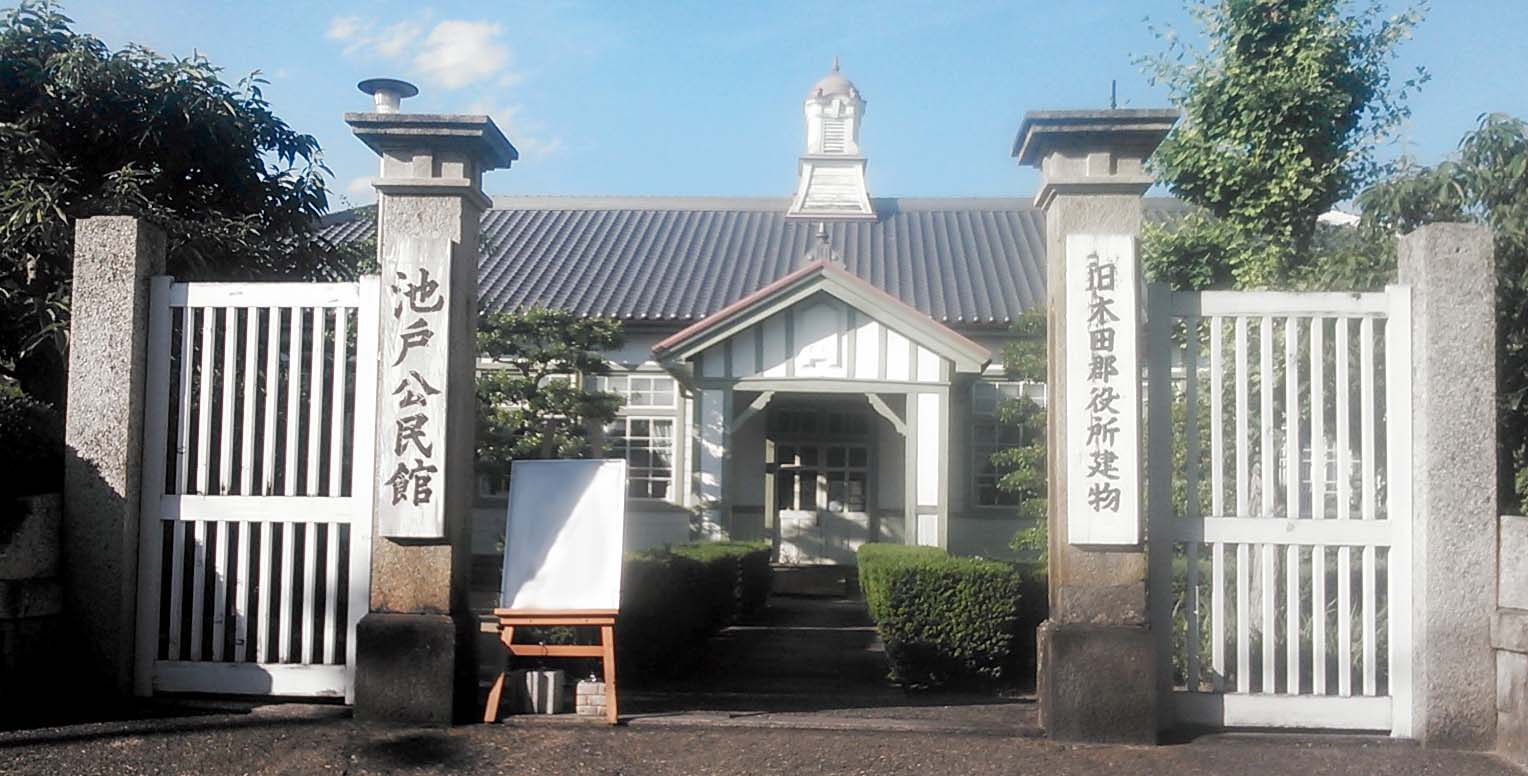
Old local government office of Kita District, Kagawa, Japan.

Kita District (木田郡, Kita-gun) is a district located in Kagawa Prefecture, Japan.

The district was formed on 1 April 1899 under the Districts Act which came into force at that time. Its area consisted of 19 villages that made up the former districts of Miki and Yamada.

During the 20th century, the villages underwent a series of mergers, whilst others merged into the neighbouring city of Takamatsu. Following the most recent merger on 10 January 2006, only the town of Miki remained within the district.

As of January 2016, the district has an estimated population of 27,835 and a total area of 75.78 km^{2}.

== Current towns and villages ==
- Miki

== History of mergers ==
- On January 10, 2006 the towns of Aji and Mure, along with the towns of Kagawa and Kōnan, both from Kagawa District, and the town of Kokubunji, from Ayauta District, merged into the expanded city of Takamatsu.
