= Ayauta, Kagawa =

Ayauta 綾歌町
- Town
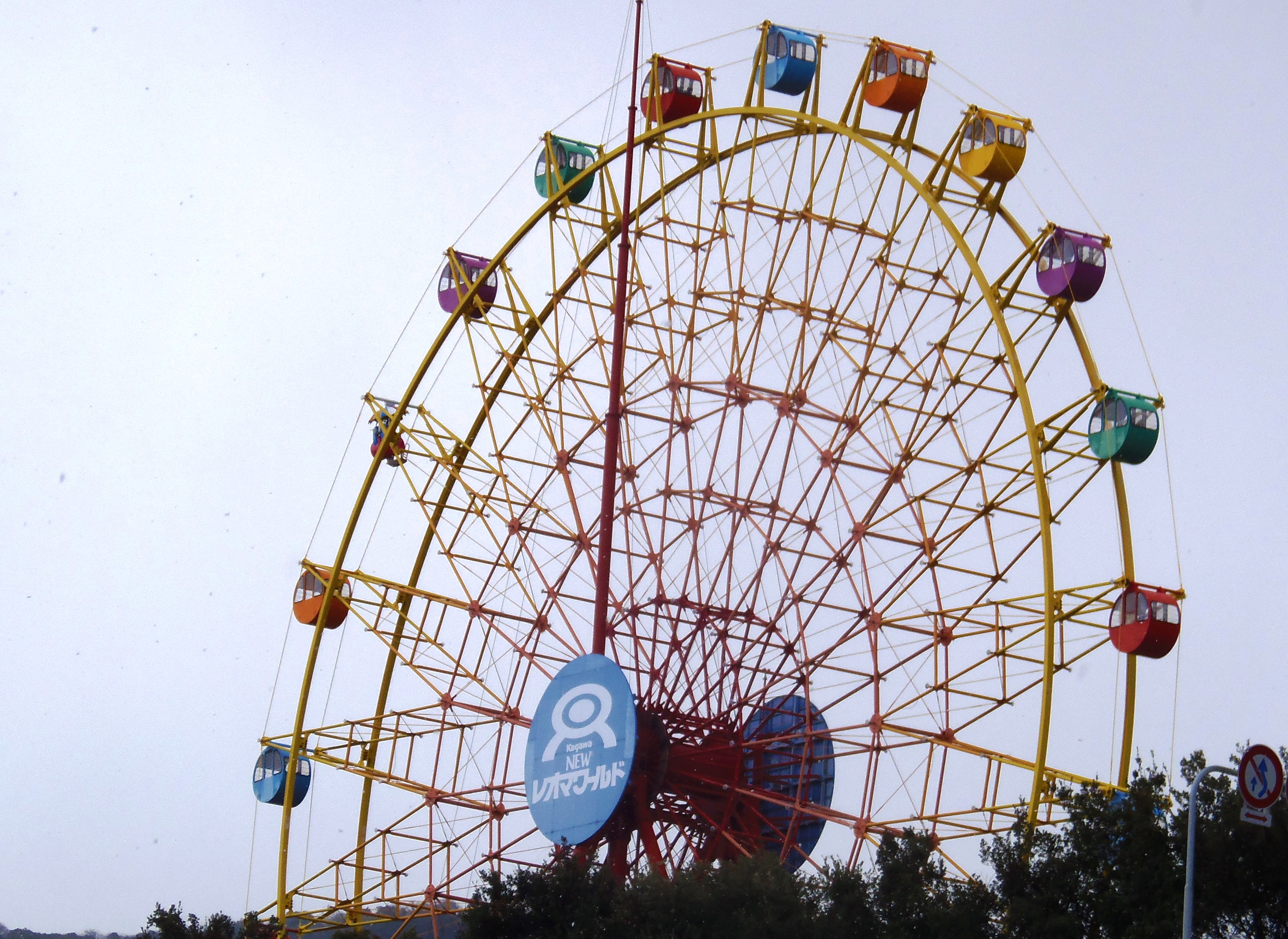
- New Reoma World

- Flag Coat of arms
- Interactive map of Ayauta
- Country: Japan
- Prefecture: Kagawa Prefecture
- District: Ayauta District
- Merged: March 22, 2005

Area
  - Total: 27.15 km^{2} (10.48 sq mi)

Population (2005)
  - Total: 11,428
  - Density: 420.9/km^{2} (1,090/sq mi)
- Flower: Chrysanthemum × morifolium
- Tree: Trochodendron
- Website: www.town.ayauta.kagawa.jp

Ayauta (綾歌町, Ayauta-chō) was a town located in Ayauta District, Kagawa Prefecture, Japan.

As of 2003, the town had an estimated population of 11,414 and a density of 420.41 persons per km^{2}. The total area was 27.15 km^{2}.

On March 22, 2005, Ayauta, along with the town of Hanzan (also from Ayauta District), was merged into the expanded city of Marugame and no longer exists as an independent municipality.
