= Hayashimichi Station =

Railway station in Takamatsu, Kagawa Prefecture, Japan

Hayashimichi Station 林道駅
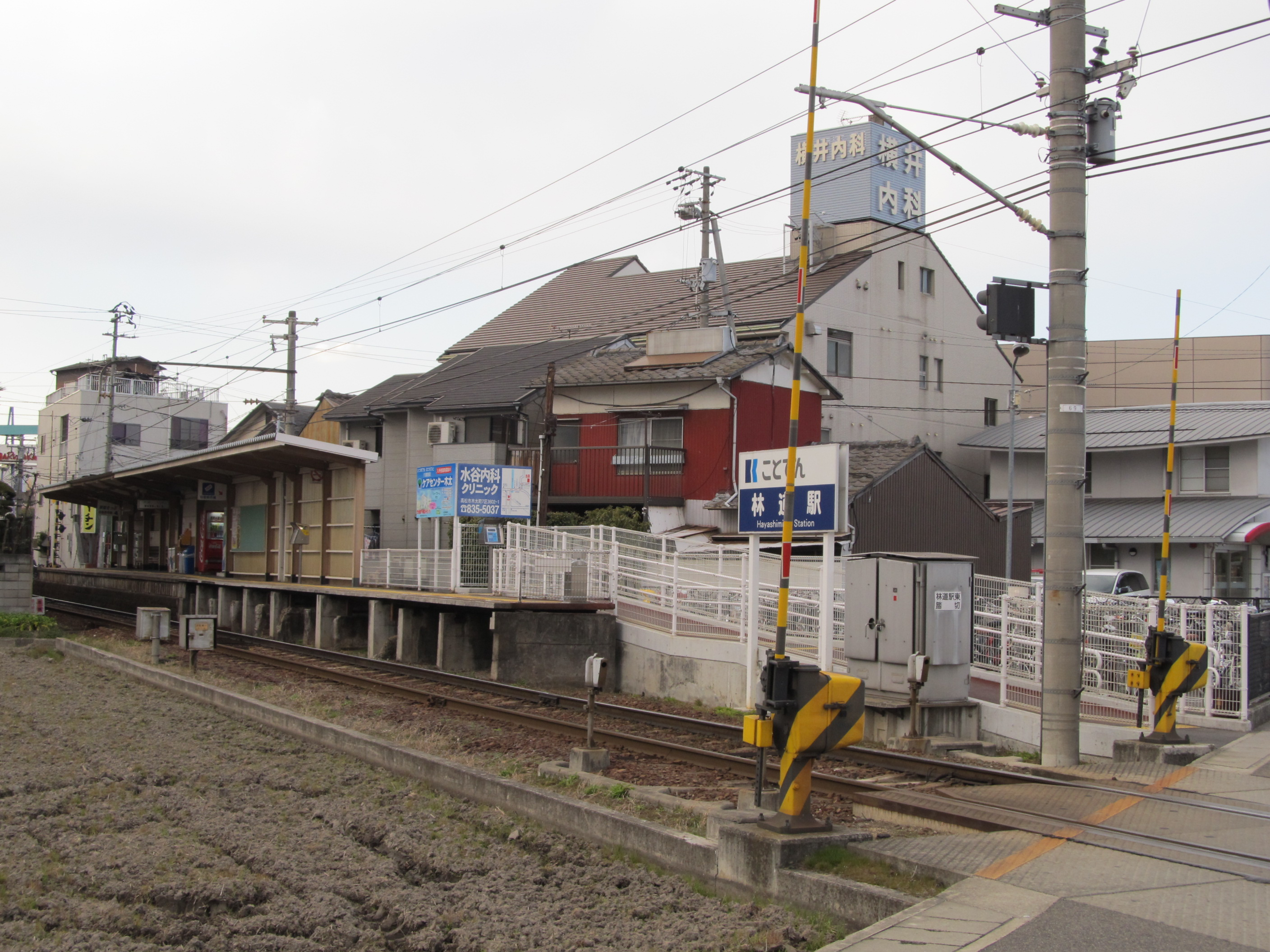
- Hayashimichi Station platform, March 2011

General information
- Location: Kitacho, Takamatsu-shi, Kagawa-ken 760-0080; Japan
- Coordinates: 34.3234°N 134.0731°E
- Operator: Takamatsu-Kotohira Electric Railroad
- Line: ■ Nagao Line
- Distance: 2.7 km from Kawaramachi
- Platforms: 1 side platform

Construction
- Structure type: At-grade
- Parking: No
- Cycle facilities: Yes
- Accessible: Yes

Other information
- Status: Unstaffed
- Station code: N04

History
- Opened: August 1, 1954

Passengers
- FY2017: 1,932 per day
Location
- Location within Kagawa Prefecture Location within Japan

Hayashimichi Station (林道駅, Hayashimichi-eki) is a passenger railway station operated by the Takamatsu-Kotohira Electric Railroad in Takamatsu, Kagawa, Japan. It is operated by the private transportation company Takamatsu-Kotohira Electric Railroad (Kotoden) and is designated station "N04".

== Lines ==
Hayashimichi Station is a station on the Kotoden Nagao Line and is located 2.7 km from the terminus of the line at Kawaramachi Station and 4.4 kilometers from Takamatsu-Chikkō Station.

== Layout ==
The station consists of one side platform serving a single bi-directional track. The station is unattended.

== Adjacent stations ==
←	Service	→
Hanazono	Nagao Line	Kita-Higashiguchi

== History ==
Hayashimichi Station opened on April 30, 1912 as a station on the Takamatsu Electric Tramway. It was closed in 1934, and reopened as a station on the Takamatsu Kotohira Electric Railway on August 1, 1954.

== Surrounding area ==
- Takamatsu Municipal Kita Elementary School
- Takamatsu Municipal Kita Minami Elementary School

== Passenger statistics ==
Ridership per day
Year	Ridership
2011	1,566
2012	1,633
2013	1,726
2014	1,694
2015	1,729
2016	1,821
2017	1,932

== See also ==
- List of railway stations in Japan
