= Ikenobe Station =

Railway station in Miki, Kagawa Prefecture, Japan

Ikenobe Station 池戸駅
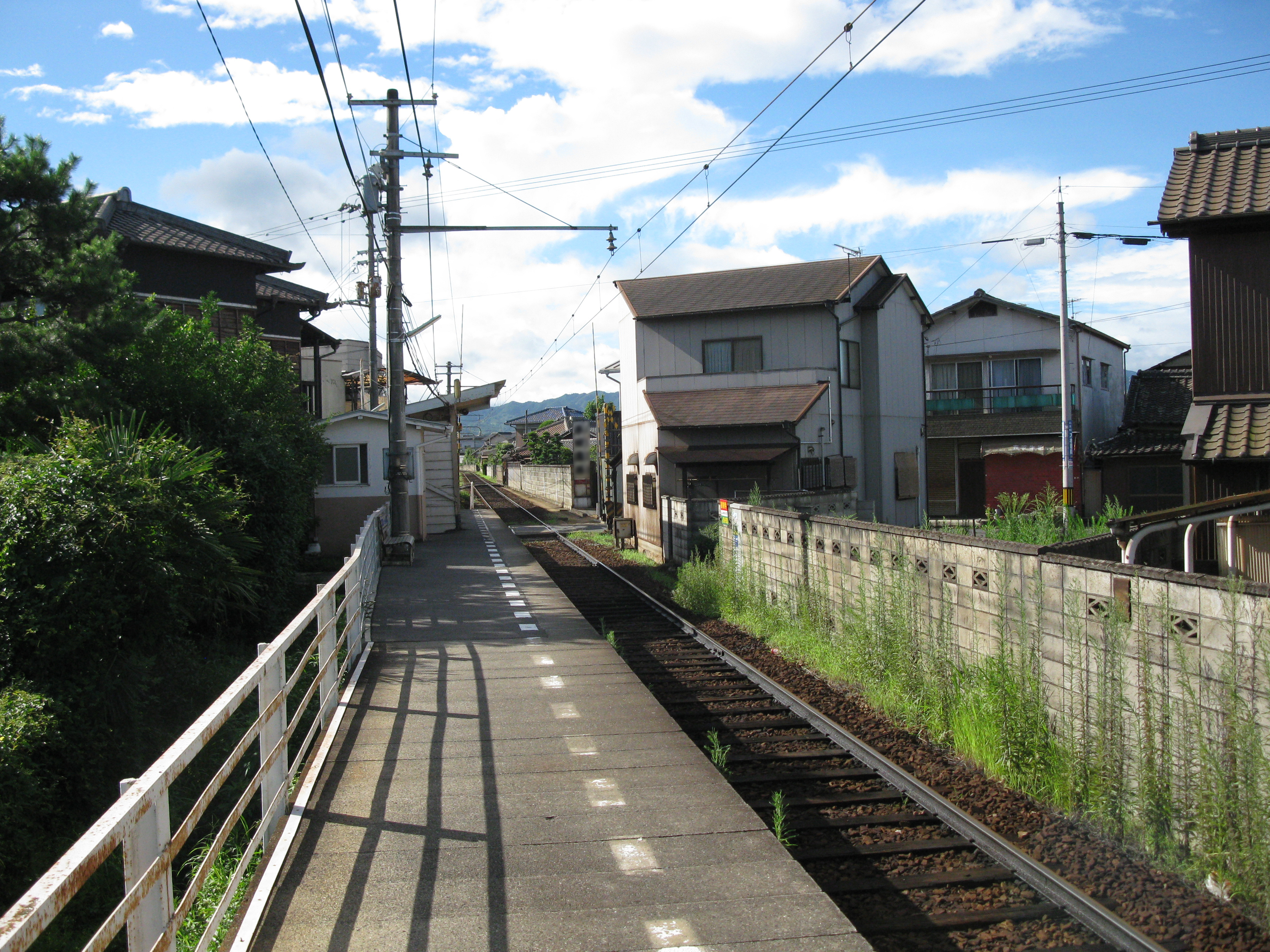
- Ikenobe Station platform

General information
- Location: Ikenobe, Miki-cho, Kita-gun, Kagawa-ken 761-0701; Japan
- Coordinates: 34.2787°N 134.1196°E
- Operator: Takamatsu-Kotohira Electric Railroad
- Line: ■ Nagao Line
- Distance: 9.6 km from Kawaramachi
- Platforms: 1 side platform

Construction
- Structure type: At-grade
- Parking: No
- Cycle facilities: Yes
- Accessible: Yes

Other information
- Station code: N10

History
- Opened: April 30, 1912

Passengers
- FY 2017: 481daily
Location
- Location within Kagawa Prefecture Location within Japan

Ikenobe Station (池戸駅, Ikenobe-eki) is a passenger railway station located in the town of in Miki, Kagawa, Japan. It is operated by the private transportation company Takamatsu-Kotohira Electric Railroad (Kotoden) and is designated station "N10".

== Lines ==
Ikenobe Station is a station on the Kotoden Nagao Line and is located 9.6 km from the opposing terminus of the line at Kawaramachi and 11.3 kilometers from Takamatsu-Chikkō Station.

== Layout ==
The station consists of a single side platform serving one bi-directional track. The station is unattended and there is no station building, but only a shelter on each platform.

== Adjacent stations ==
←	Service	→
Takata	Nagao Line	Nōgakubumae

== History ==
Ikenobe Station opened on March 15, 1927 as a station of the Kotohira Electric Railway. On November 1, 1943 it became a station on the Takamatsu Kotohira Electric Railway Kotohira Line due to a company merger.

== Surrounding area ==
- Ikenobe Shopping Street
- Faculty of Agriculture, Kagawa University

== Passenger statistics ==
Ridership per day
Year	Ridership
2011	472
2012	476
2013	479
2014	446
2015	450
2016	486
2017	481

== See also ==
- List of railway stations in Japan
