= Mizuta Station =

Railway station in Takamatsu, Kagawa Prefecture, Japan

Mizuta Station 水田駅
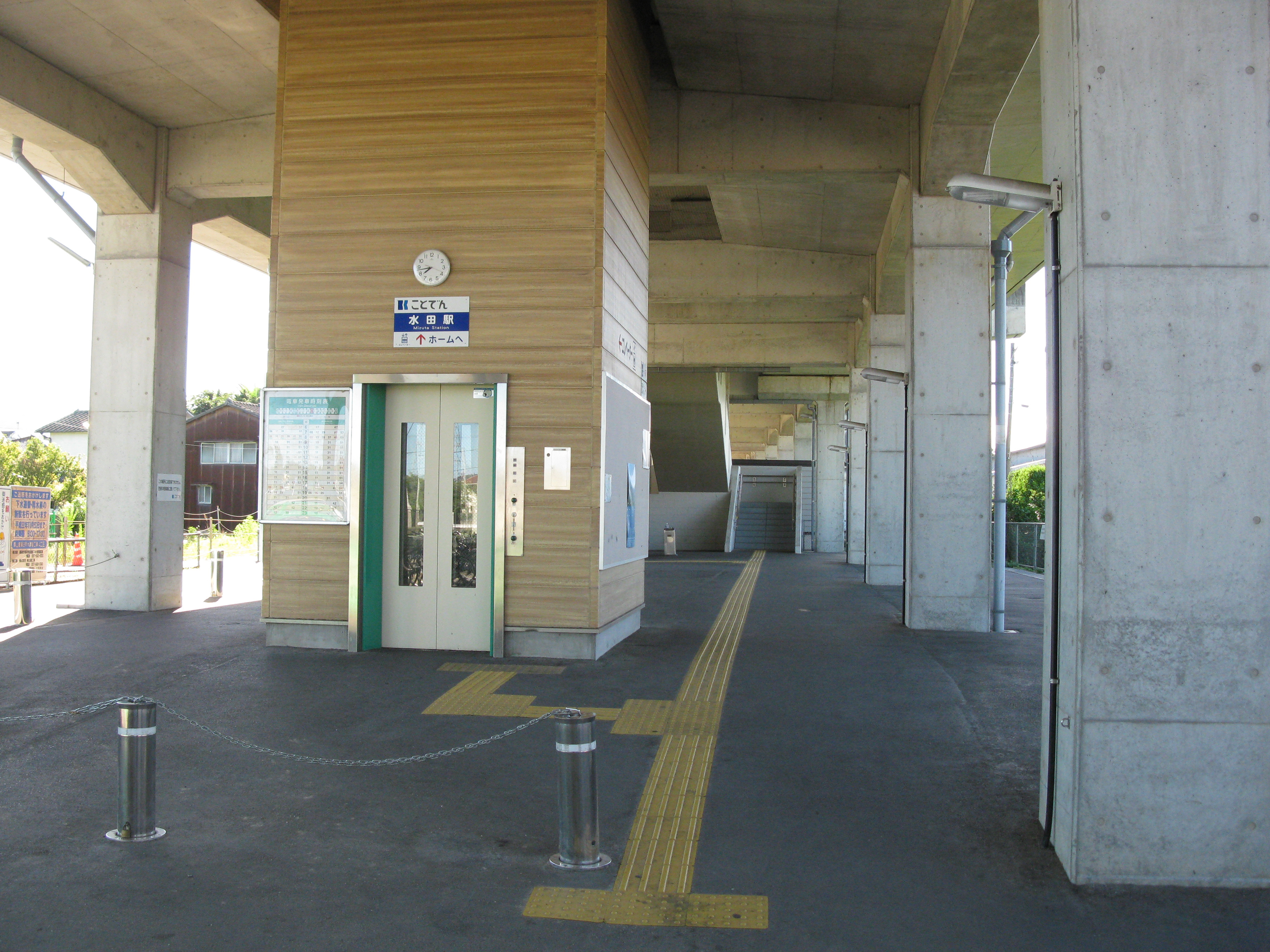
- Mizuta Station entrance

General information
- Location: Higashiyamasakicho, Takamatsu-shi, Kagawa-ken 761-0312; Japan
- Coordinates: 34.3030°N 134.0927°E
- Operator: Takamatsu-Kotohira Electric Railroad
- Line: ■ Nagao Line
- Distance: 5.8 km from Kawaramachi
- Platforms: 1 island platform

Construction
- Structure type: Elevated
- Parking: No
- Cycle facilities: Yes
- Accessible: Yes

Other information
- Status: Unstaffed
- Station code: N07

History
- Opened: April 30, 1912

Passengers
- FY2017: 1,156 per day
Location
- Location within Kagawa Prefecture Location within Japan

Mizuta Station (水田駅, Mizuta-eki) is a passenger railway station operated by the Takamatsu-Kotohira Electric Railroad in Takamatsu, Kagawa, Japan. It is operated by the private transportation company Takamatsu-Kotohira Electric Railroad (Kotoden) and is designated station "N07".

== Lines ==
Mizuta Station is a station on the Kotoden Nagao Line and is located 5.8 km from the terminus of the line at Kawaramachi Station and 7.5 kilometers from Takamatsu-Chikkō Station.

== Layout ==
The station consists of one elevated island platform with the station building underneath. The station is unattended. It is the only elevated station operated by Kotoden.

== Adjacent stations ==
←	Service	→
Motoyama	Nagao Line	Nishi-Maeda

== History ==
Mizuta Station opened as a station on the Takamatsu Electric Tramway on April 30, 1912. On November 1, 1943, it became a station on the Takamatsu Kotohira Electric Railway. Elevation of the tracks was completed in October 2007.

== Surrounding area ==
- Takamatsu Municipal Kawazoe Elementary School
- Japan National Route 11 Takamatsu East Bypass (Sanuki Yume Kaido)

== Passenger statistics ==
Ridership per day
Year	Ridership
2011	1,008
2012	969
2013	1,004
2014	1,035
2015	1,129
2016	1,172
2017	1,156

== See also ==
- List of railway stations in Japan
