= Hiragi Station =

Railway station in Miki, Kagawa Prefecture, Japan

Hiragi Station 平木駅
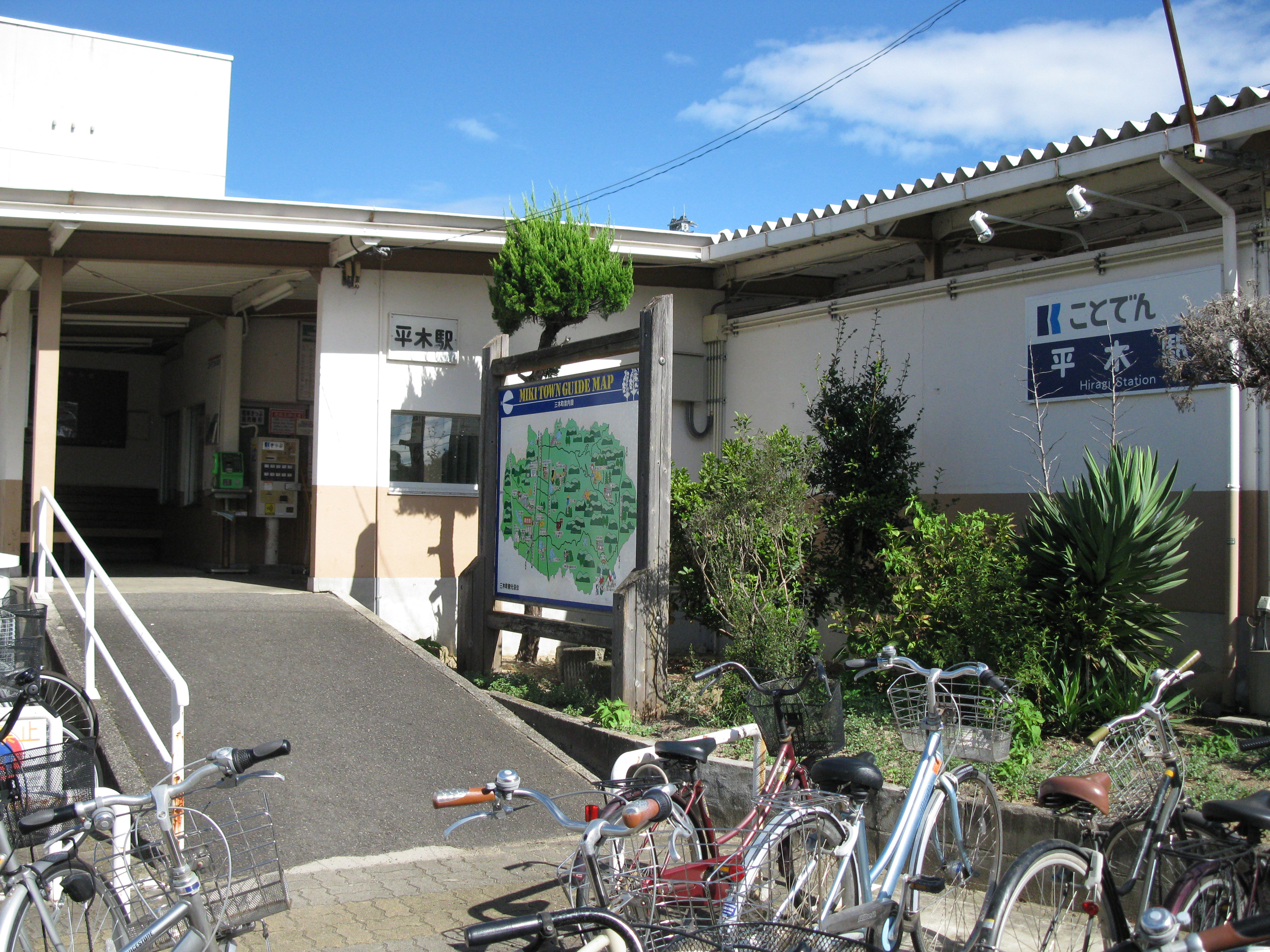
- Hiragi Station entrance

General information
- Location: 13-1 Hiragicho, Miki, Kita-gun, Kagawa-ken 761-0702; Japan
- Coordinates: 34.2722°N 134.1312°E
- Operator: Takamatsu-Kotohira Electric Railroad
- Line: ■ Nagao Line
- Distance: 10.9 km from Kawaramachi
- Platforms: 2 side platforms

Construction
- Structure type: At-grade
- Parking: No
- Cycle facilities: Yes
- Accessible: Yes

Other information
- Station code: N12

History
- Opened: April 30, 1912

Passengers
- FY 2017: 430 per day (2017)
Location
- Location within Kagawa Prefecture Location within Japan

Hiragi Station (平木駅, Hiragi-eki) is a passenger railway station located in the town of in Miki, Kagawa, Japan. It is operated by the private transportation company Takamatsu-Kotohira Electric Railroad (Kotoden) and is designated station "N12".

== Lines ==
Hiragi Station is a station on the Kotoden Nagao Line and is located 10.9 km from the opposing terminus of the line at Kawaramachi and 12.6 kilometers from Takamatsu-Chikkō Station.

== Layout ==
The station consists of two opposed side platforms connected by a level crossing. The station is unattended.

== Adjacent stations ==
←	Service	→
Nōgakubumae	Nagao Line	Gakuen-dōri

== History ==
Hiragi Station opened on April 30, 1912 as a station of the Kotohira Electric Railway. On November 1, 1943 it became a station on the Takamatsu Kotohira Electric Railway Kotohira Line due to a company merger. The station building was reconstructed in 1978.

== Surrounding area ==
- Miki Municipal Miki Junior High School

== Ridership ==
Ridership per day
Year	Ridership
2011	405
2012	393
2013	435
2014	424
2015	408
2016	428
2017	430

== See also ==
- List of railway stations in Japan
