= Kita-Higashiguchi Station =

Railway station in Takamatsu, Kagawa Prefecture, Japan

Kita-Higashiguchi Station 木太東口駅
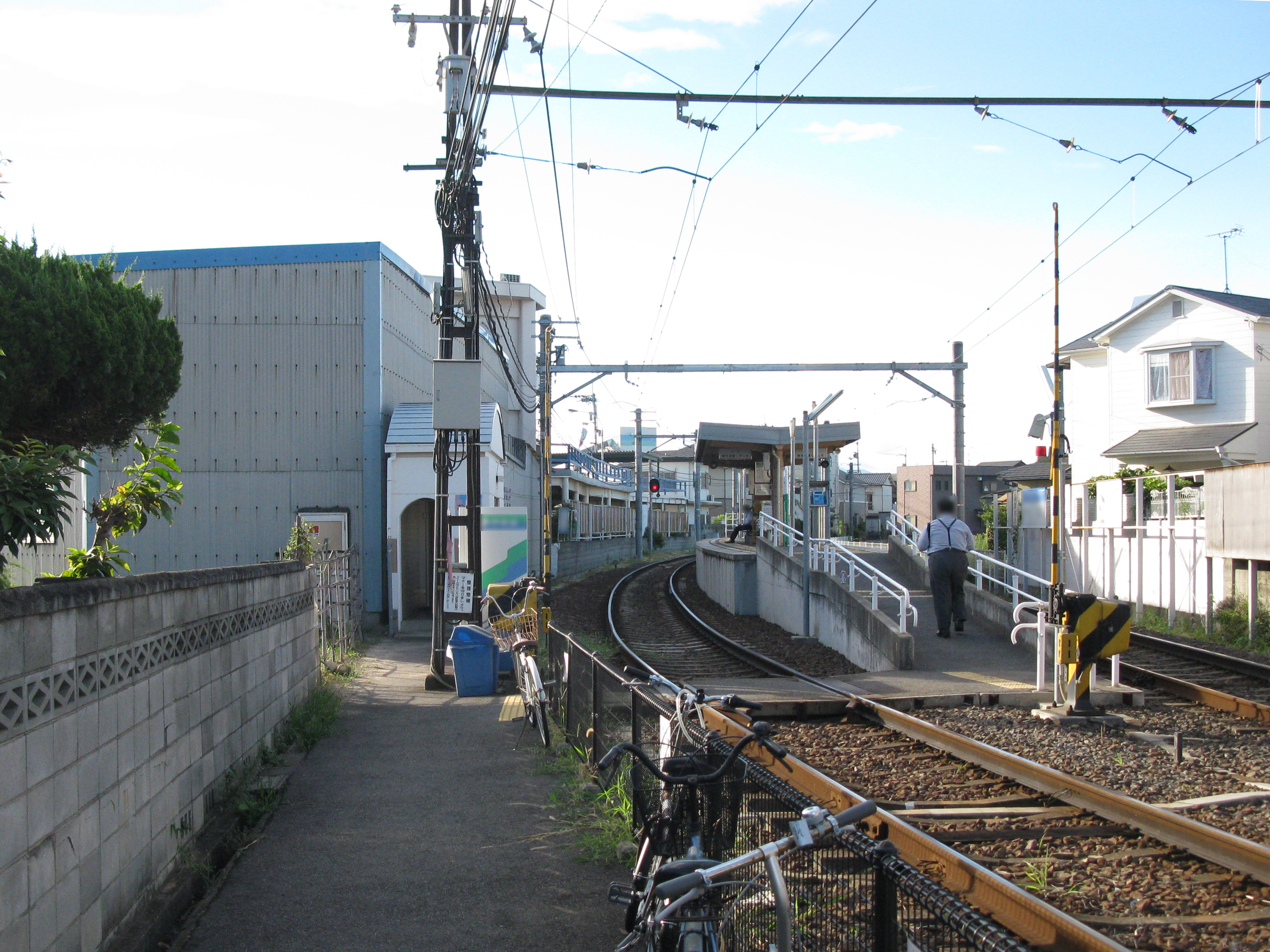
- Kita-Higashiguchi Station platform, August 2010

General information
- Location: Kitacho, Takamatsu-shi, Kagawa-ken 760-0080; Japan
- Coordinates: 34.3198°N 134.0794°E
- Operator: Takamatsu-Kotohira Electric Railroad
- Line: ■ Nagao Line
- Distance: 3.4 km from Kawaramachi
- Platforms: 1 island platform

Construction
- Structure type: At-grade
- Parking: No
- Cycle facilities: Yes
- Accessible: Yes

Other information
- Status: Unstaffed
- Station code: N05

History
- Opened: April 30, 1912

Passengers
- FY2017: 939 per day
Location
- Location within Kagawa Prefecture Location within Japan

Kita-Higashiguchi Station (木太東口駅, Kita-Higashiguchi-eki) is a passenger railway station operated by the Takamatsu-Kotohira Electric Railroad in Takamatsu, Kagawa, Japan. It is operated by the private transportation company Takamatsu-Kotohira Electric Railroad (Kotoden) and is designated station "N05".

== Lines ==
Kita-Higashiguchi Station is a station on the Kotoden Nagao Line and is located 3.4 km from the terminus of the line at Kawaramachi Station and 5.1 kilometers from Takamatsu-Chikkō Station.

== Layout ==
The station consists of one island platform with a rain shelter; there is no station building. The platform is connected to the street by a level crossing. The station is unattended.

== Adjacent stations ==
←	Service	→
Hayashimichi	Nagao Line	Motoyama

== History ==
Kita-Higashiguchi Station opened on April 30, 1912, as a station on the Takamatsu Electric Tramway. On November 1, 1943, it became a station on the Takamatsu Kotohira Electric Railway.

== Surrounding area ==
- Takamatsu Municipal Kita Elementary School
- Takamatsu Municipal Kita Minami Elementary School

== Passenger statistics ==
Ridership per day
Year	Ridership
2011	675
2012	706
2013	719
2014	780
2015	814
2016	871
2017	939

== See also ==
- List of railway stations in Japan
