= Motoyama Station =

Motoyama Station is the name of five train stations in Japan:

- Motoyama Station (Nagoya), in Aichi Prefecture
- Motoyama Station (Chiba), in Chiba Prefecture
- Motoyama Station (Takamatsu), on the Kotoden Nagao Line in Kagawa Prefecture
- Motoyama Station (Mitoyo), in Mitoyo, Kagawa Prefecture
- Motoyama Station (Nagasaki), on the Nishi-Kyūshū Line in Nagasaki Prefecture

== See also ==
- Motoyama (disambiguation)
