= Nōgakubumae Station =

Railway station in Miki, Kagawa Prefecture, Japan

Nōgakubumae Station 農学部前駅
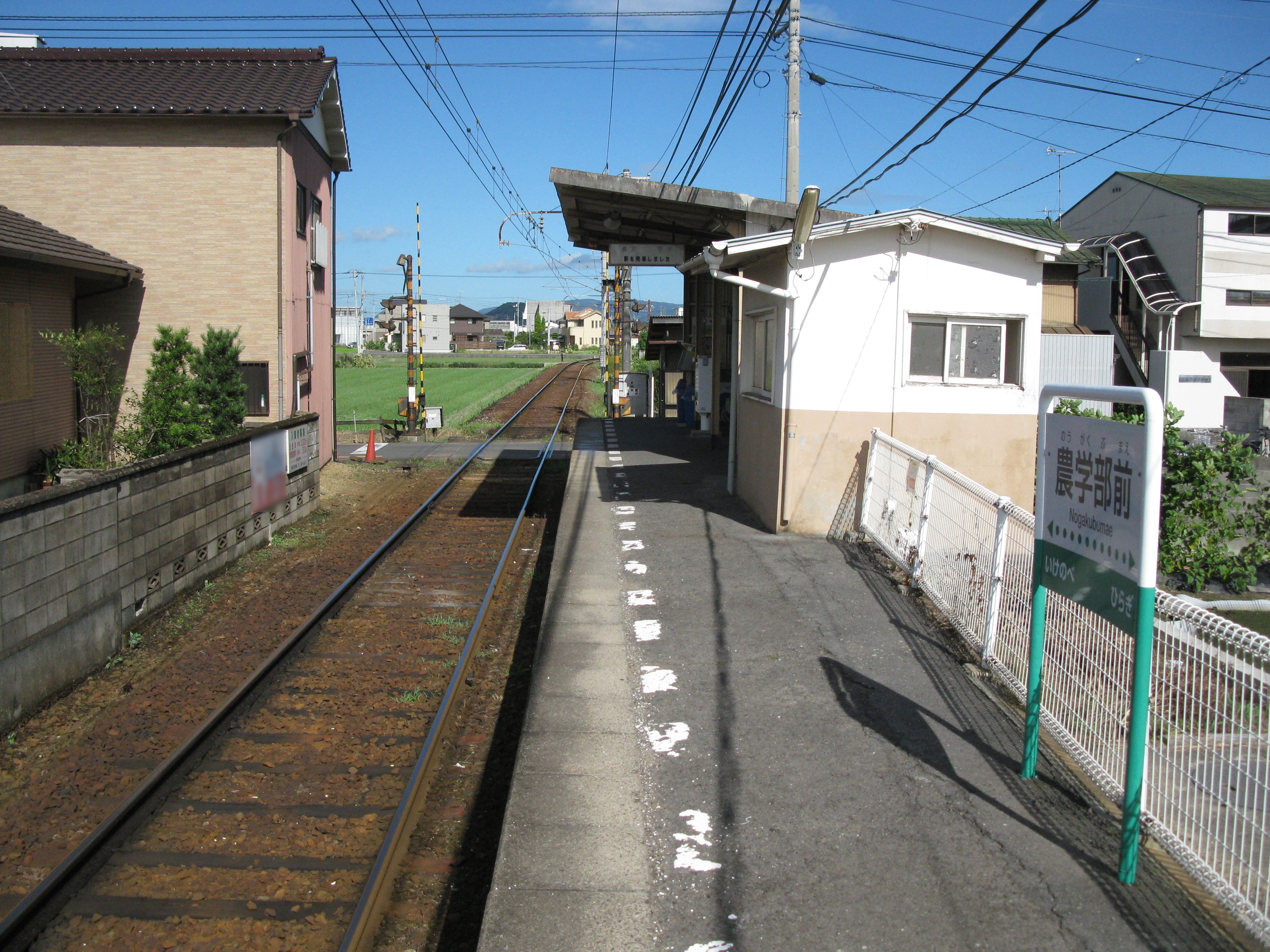
- Nōgakubumae Station platform

General information
- Location: Ikenobe, Miki-cho, Kita-gun, Kagawa-ken 761-0701; Japan
- Coordinates: 34.2739°N 134.1255°E
- Operator: Takamatsu-Kotohira Electric Railroad
- Line: ■ Nagao Line
- Distance: 10.4 km from Kawaramachi
- Platforms: 1 side platform

Construction
- Structure type: At-grade
- Parking: No
- Cycle facilities: Yes
- Accessible: No

Other information
- Station code: N11

History
- Opened: April 30, 1912
- Former names: Tanakamichi (to 1943); Nōgakudai (to 1950)

Passengers
- FY 2017: 737 daily
Location
- Location within Kagawa Prefecture Location within Japan

Nōgakubumae Station (農学部前駅, Nōgakubumae-eki) is a passenger railway station located in the town of Miki, Kagawa, Japan. It is operated by the private transportation company Takamatsu-Kotohira Electric Railroad (Kotoden) and is designated station "N11".

== Lines ==
Nōgakubumae Station is a station on the Kotoden Nagao Line and is located 10.4 km from the opposing terminus of the line at Kawaramachi and 12.1 kilometers from Takamatsu-Chikkō Station.

== Layout ==
The station consists of a single side platform serving one bi-directional track. The station is unattended and there is no station building, but only a shelter on each platform.

== Adjacent stations ==
←	Service	→
Ikenobe	Nagao Line	Hiragi

== History ==
Nōgakubumae Station opened on April 30, 1912 as Tanakamichi Station (田中道駅) of the Kotohira Electric Railway. On November 1, 1943 it became a station on the Takamatsu Kotohira Electric Railway Kotohira Line due to a company merger. It was renamed Nōgakudai Station (農大前駅) on April 10, 1950 and renamed again to its present name on February 1, 1958.

== Surrounding area ==
- Faculty of Agriculture, Kagawa University

== Passenger statistics ==
Ridership per day
Year	Ridership
2011	631
2012	655
2013	698
2014	708
2015	732
2016	744
2017	737

== See also ==
- List of railway stations in Japan
