= Ido Station =

Railway station in Miki, Kagawa Prefecture, Japan

Ido Station 井戸駅
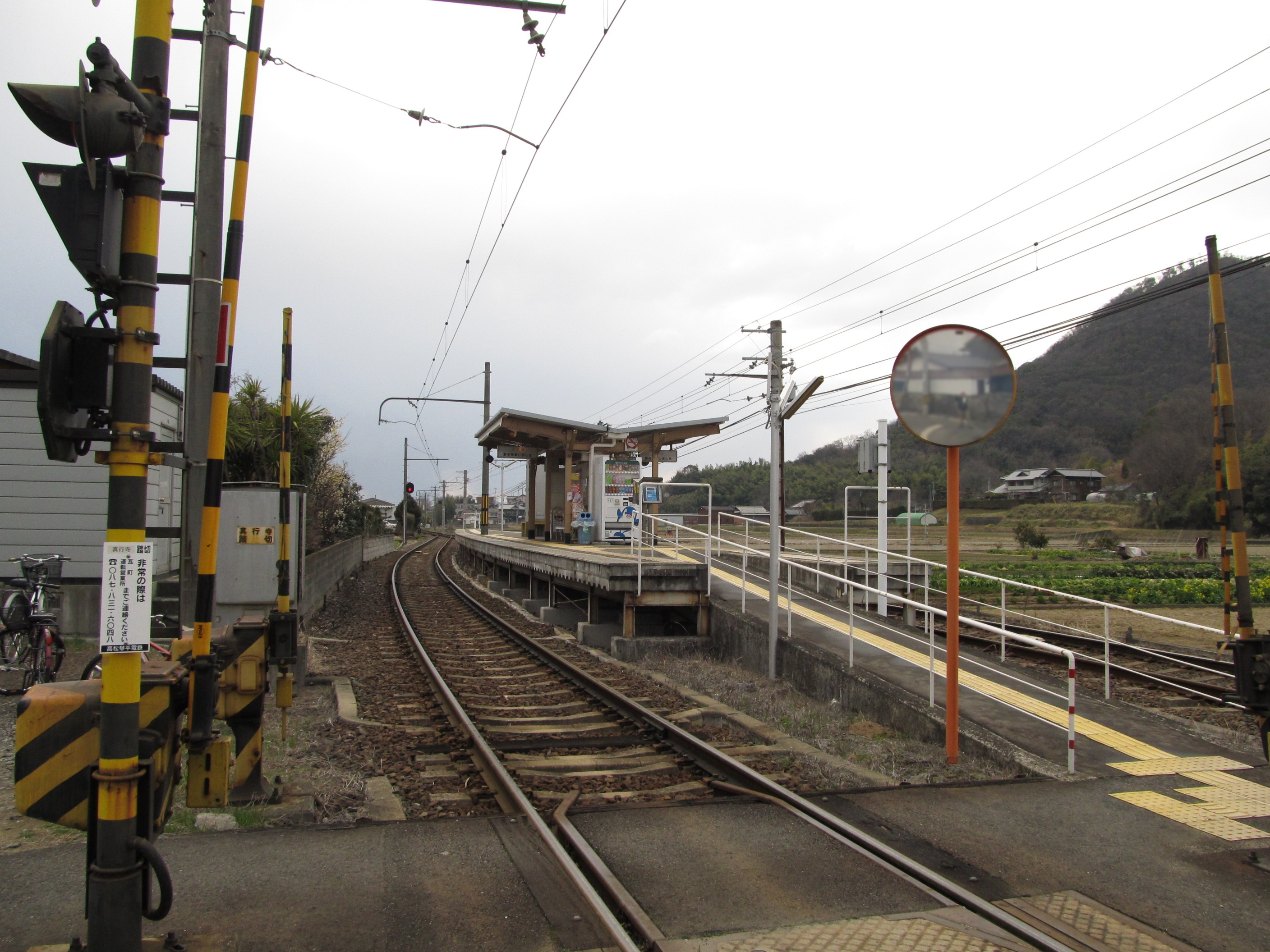
- Ido Station entrance

General information
- Location: Ido, Miki-cho, Kita-gun, Kagawa-ken 761-0823; Japan
- Coordinates: 34.2667°N 134.1561°E
- Operator: Takamatsu-Kotohira Electric Railroad
- Line: ■ Nagao Line
- Distance: 13.3 km from Kawaramachi
- Platforms: 1 island platform

Construction
- Structure type: At-grade
- Parking: No
- Cycle facilities: Yes
- Accessible: Yes

Other information
- Station code: N15

History
- Opened: July 25, 1947

Passengers
- FY 2017: 69 per day (2017)
Location
- Location within Kagawa Prefecture Location within Japan

Ido Station (井戸駅, Ido-eki) is a passenger railway station located in the town of in Miki, Kagawa, Japan. It is operated by the private transportation company Takamatsu-Kotohira Electric Railroad (Kotoden) and is designated station "N15".

== Lines ==
Ido Station is a station on the Kotoden Nagao Line and is located 13.3 km from the opposing terminus of the line at Kawaramachi and 15.0 kilometers from Takamatsu-Chikkō Station.

== Layout ==
The station consists of a single island platform with a level crossing. The station is unattended and there is no station building, but only a shelter on each platform.

== Adjacent stations ==
←	Service	→
Shirayama	Nagao Line	Kumonmyō

== History ==
Ido Station opened on April 25, 1947 as Shingyoji Station (真行寺駅). It was renamed to its present name on March 1, 1951.

== Surrounding area ==
- Shingyo-ji Temple
- Aoba Kindergarten

== Passenger statistics ==
Ridership per day
Year	Ridership
2011	71
2012	77
2013	76
2014	67
2015	73
2016	72
2017	69

== See also ==
- List of railway stations in Japan
