= Kumonmyō Station =

Railway station in Miki, Kagawa Prefecture, Japan

Kumonmyō Station 公文明駅
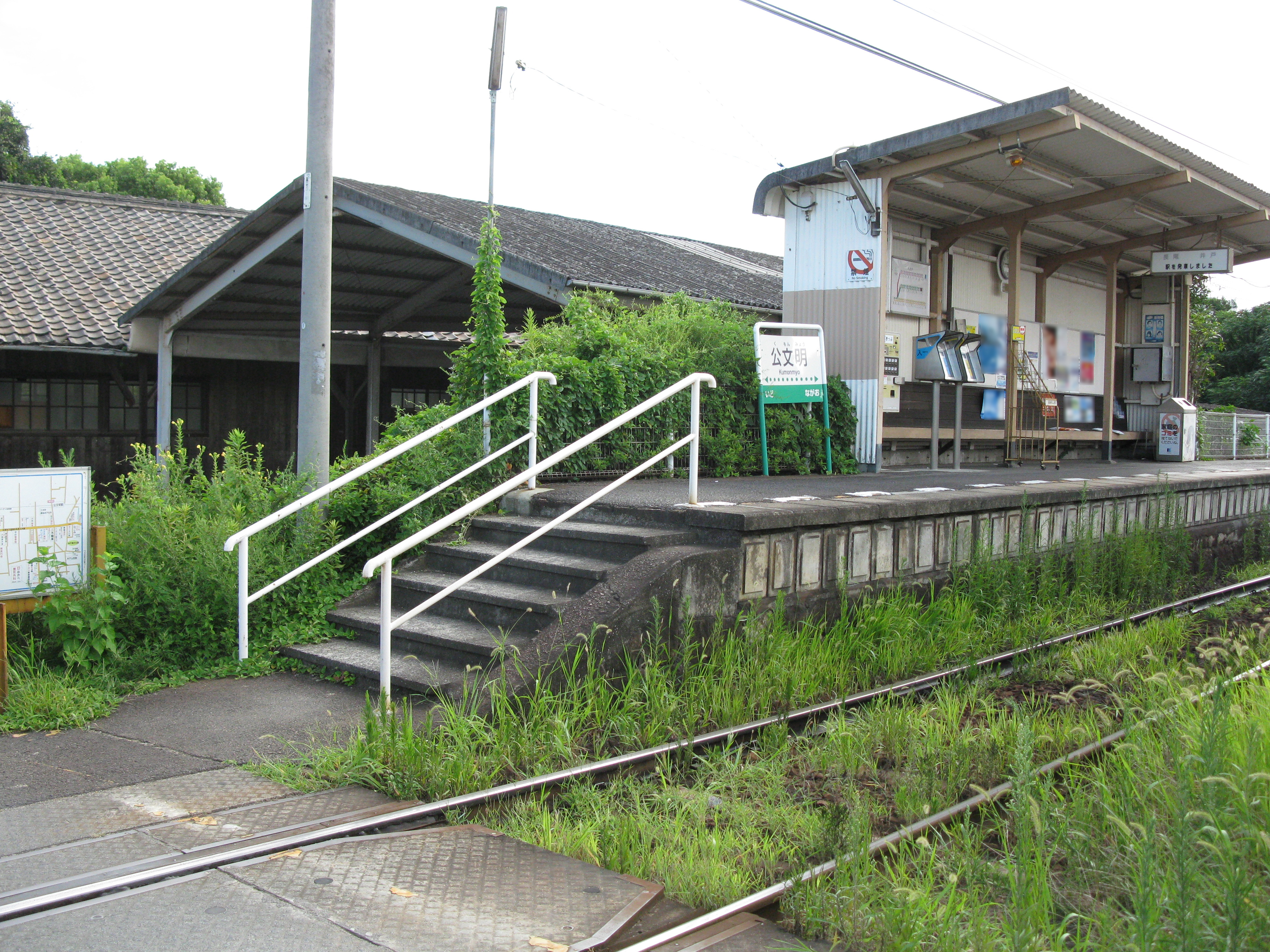
- Station entrance

General information
- Location: Ido, Miki-cho, Kita-gun, Kagawa-ken 761-0823; Japan
- Coordinates: 34.2667°N 134.1619°E
- Operator: Takamatsu-Kotohira Electric Railroad
- Line: ■ Nagao Line
- Distance: 13.9 km from Kawaramachi
- Platforms: 1 side platform

Construction
- Structure type: At-grade
- Parking: No
- Cycle facilities: No
- Accessible: No

Other information
- Station code: N16

History
- Opened: September 30, 1952
- Former names: Ido (to 1915); Idogawa (to 1952)

Passengers
- FY 2017: 230 per day (2017)
Location
- Location within Kagawa Prefecture Location within Japan

Kumonmyō Station (公文明駅, Kumonmyō-eki) is a passenger railway station located in the town of in Miki, Kagawa, Japan. It is operated by the private transportation company Takamatsu-Kotohira Electric Railroad (Kotoden) and is designated station "N16".

== Lines ==
Kumonmyō Station is a station on the Kotoden Nagao Line and is located 13.9 km from the opposing terminus of the line at Kawaramachi and 15.6 kilometers from Takamatsu-Chikkō Station.

== Layout ==
The station consists of a single side platform serving one bi-directional track. The station is unattended and there is no station building, but only a shelter on each platform.

== Adjacent stations ==
←	Service	→
Ido	Nagao Line	Nagao

== History ==
Kumonmyō Station opened on April 30, 1912 as Ido Station (井戸駅) the Kotohira Electric Railway. It was renamed Idogawa Station (井戸川駅) in 1915. On November 1, 1943 it became a station on the Takamatsu Kotohira Electric Railway Kotohira Line due to a company merger. On September 30, 1952 it was renamed to its present name.

== Surrounding area ==
- Waganami Shrine
- Miki Town Ido branch office

== Passenger statistics ==
Ridership per day
Year	Ridership
2011	189
2012	204
2013	222
2014	219
2015	217
2016	221
2017	230

== See also ==
- List of railway stations in Japan
