= Nishi-Maeda Station =

Railway station in Takamatsu, Kagawa Prefecture, Japan

Nishi-Maeda Station 西前田駅
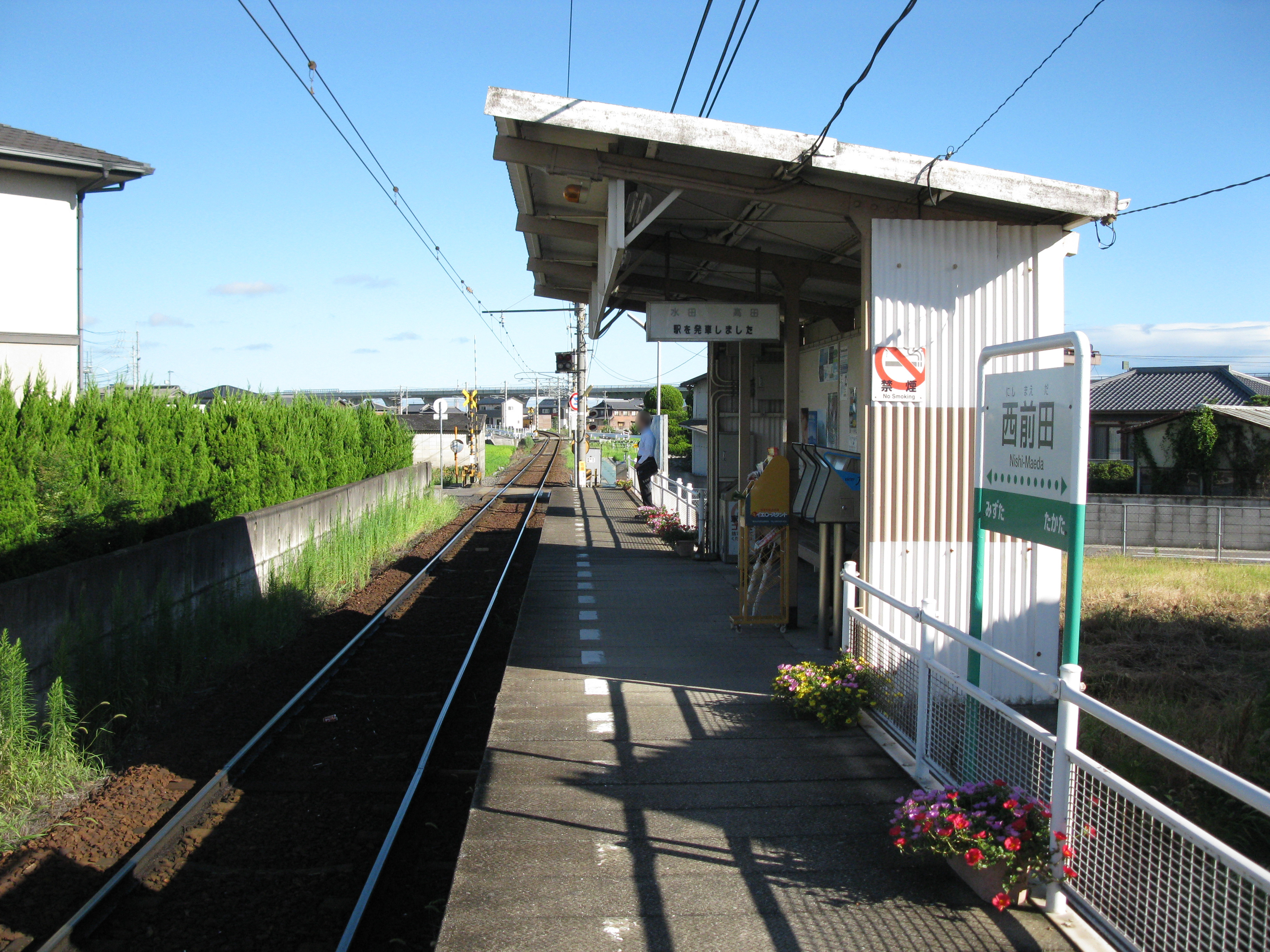
- Nishi-Maeda Station platform

General information
- Location: Maeda Higashimachi, Takamatsu-shi, Kagawa-ken 761-0322; Japan
- Coordinates: 34.2959°N 134.1048°E
- Operator: Takamatsu-Kotohira Electric Railroad
- Line: ■ Nagao Line
- Distance: 7.2 km from Kawaramachi
- Platforms: 1 side platform

Construction
- Structure type: At-grade
- Parking: No
- Cycle facilities: Yes
- Accessible: Yes

Other information
- Status: Unstaffed
- Station code: N08

History
- Opened: April 30, 1912

Passengers
- FY2017: 137 per day
Location
- Location within Kagawa Prefecture Location within Japan

Nishi-Maeda Station (西前田駅, Nishi-Maeda-eki) is a passenger railway station operated by the Takamatsu-Kotohira Electric Railroad in Takamatsu, Kagawa, Japan. It is operated by the private transportation company Takamatsu-Kotohira Electric Railroad (Kotoden) and is designated station "N08".

== Lines ==
Nishi-Maeda Station is a station on the Kotoden Nagao Line and is located 7.2 km(4.47387 mi) from the terminus of the line at Kawaramachi Station and 8.9 kilometers from Takamatsu-Chikkō Station.

== Layout ==
The station consists of one side platform serving a single track. The station is unattended.

== Adjacent stations ==
←	Service	→
Mizuta	Nagao Line	Takata

== History ==
Nishi-Maeda Station opened on April 30, 1912, as a station on the Takamatsu Electric Tramway. It was located near the east end of the Yoshida River near Kawaramachi from the current location. On November 1, 1943, it became a station on the Takamatsu Kotohira Electric Railway Nagao Line. On June 21, 1963, it was moved to the current location.

== Surrounding area ==
- Takamatsu City Maeda Elementary School
- Maeda Cultural Center
- Nakagawa Rimbo Children's Center

== Passenger statistics ==
Ridership per day
Year	Ridership
2011	97
2012	118
2013	122
2014	125
2015	126
2016	131
2017	137

== See also ==
- List of railway stations in Japan
