= Gakuen-dōri Station =

Railway station in Miki, Kagawa Prefecture, Japan

Gakuen-dōri Station 学園通り駅
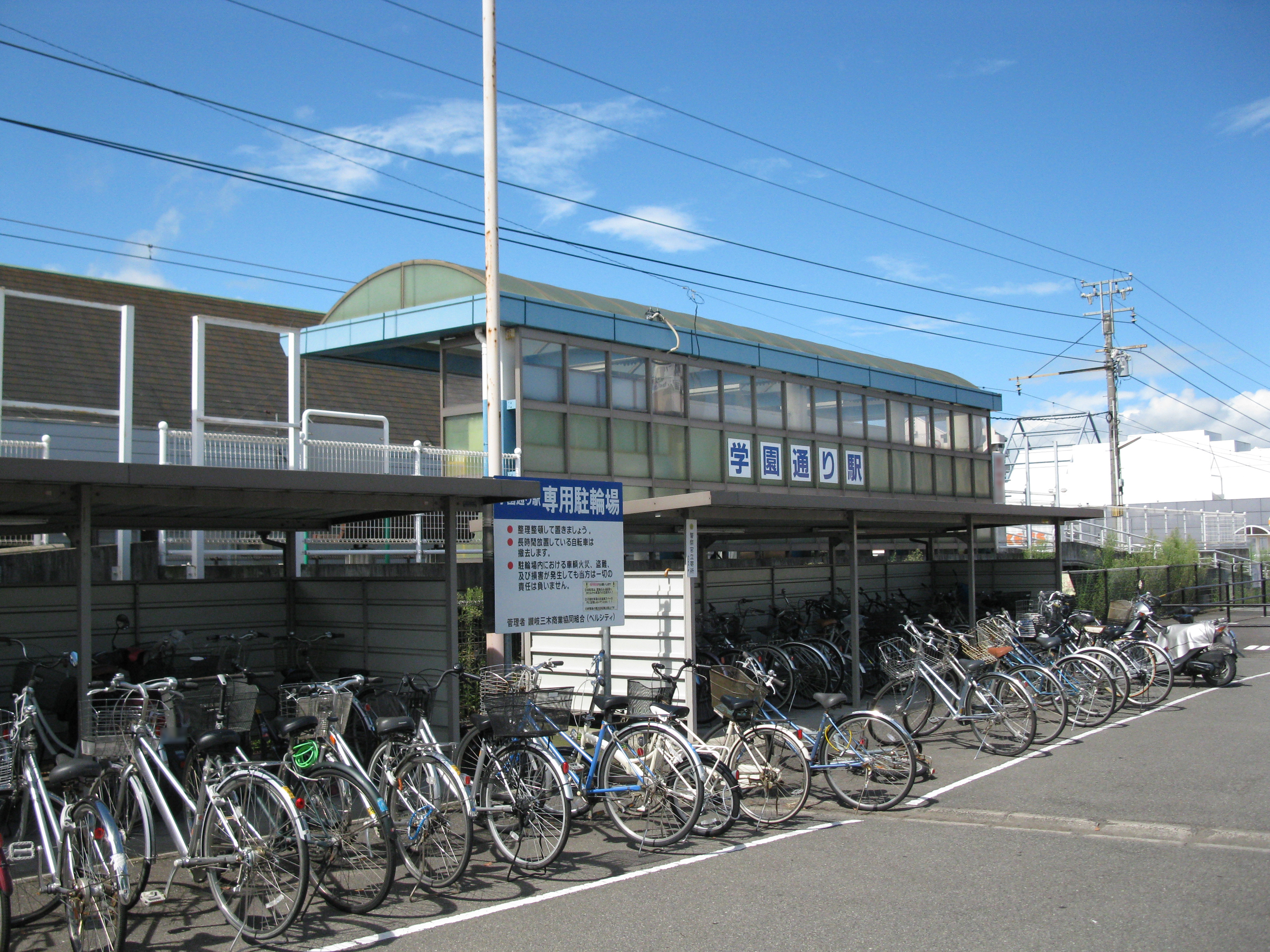
- Gakuen-dōri Station entrance

General information
- Location: Shishibuse, Miki-cho, Kita-gun, Kagawa-ken 761-0703; Japan
- Coordinates: 34.2705°N 134.1370°E
- Operator: Takamatsu-Kotohira Electric Railroad
- Line: ■ Nagao Line
- Distance: 11.5 km from Kawaramachi
- Platforms: 1 side platform

Construction
- Structure type: At-grade
- Parking: Yes
- Cycle facilities: Yes
- Accessible: Yes

Other information
- Station code: N13

History
- Opened: September 28, 2002

Passengers
- FY 2017: 1,266 per day (2017)
Location
- Location within Kagawa Prefecture Location within Japan

Gakuen-dōri Station (学園通り駅, Gakuen-dōri-eki; lit. School Road Station) is a passenger railway station located in the town of in Miki, Kagawa, Japan. It is operated by the private transportation company Takamatsu-Kotohira Electric Railroad (Kotoden) and is designated station "N10".

== Lines ==
Gakuen-dōri Station is a station on the Kotoden Nagao Line and is located 11.5 km from the opposing terminus of the line at Kawaramachi and 13.2 kilometers from Takamatsu-Chikkō Station.

== Layout ==
The station consists of a single side platform serving one bi-directional track. The station is unattended. The station entrance has slopes from both sides of the station waiting area to the east and west ends of the station.

== Adjacent stations ==
←	Service	→
Hiragi	Nagao Line	Shirayama

== History ==
Gakuen-dōri Station opened on September 28, 2002

== Surrounding area ==
- Kagawa Prefectural Miki High School
- Miki Town Office

== Passenger statistics ==
Ridership per day
Year	Ridership
2011	1,073
2012	1,100
2013	1,112
2014	1,141
2015	1,213
2016	1,229
2017	1,266

== See also ==
- List of railway stations in Japan
