= Takata Station (Kagawa) =

Railway station in Takamatsu, Kagawa Prefecture, Japan

Coordinates: 34.2885°N 134.1120°E

Takata Station 高田駅
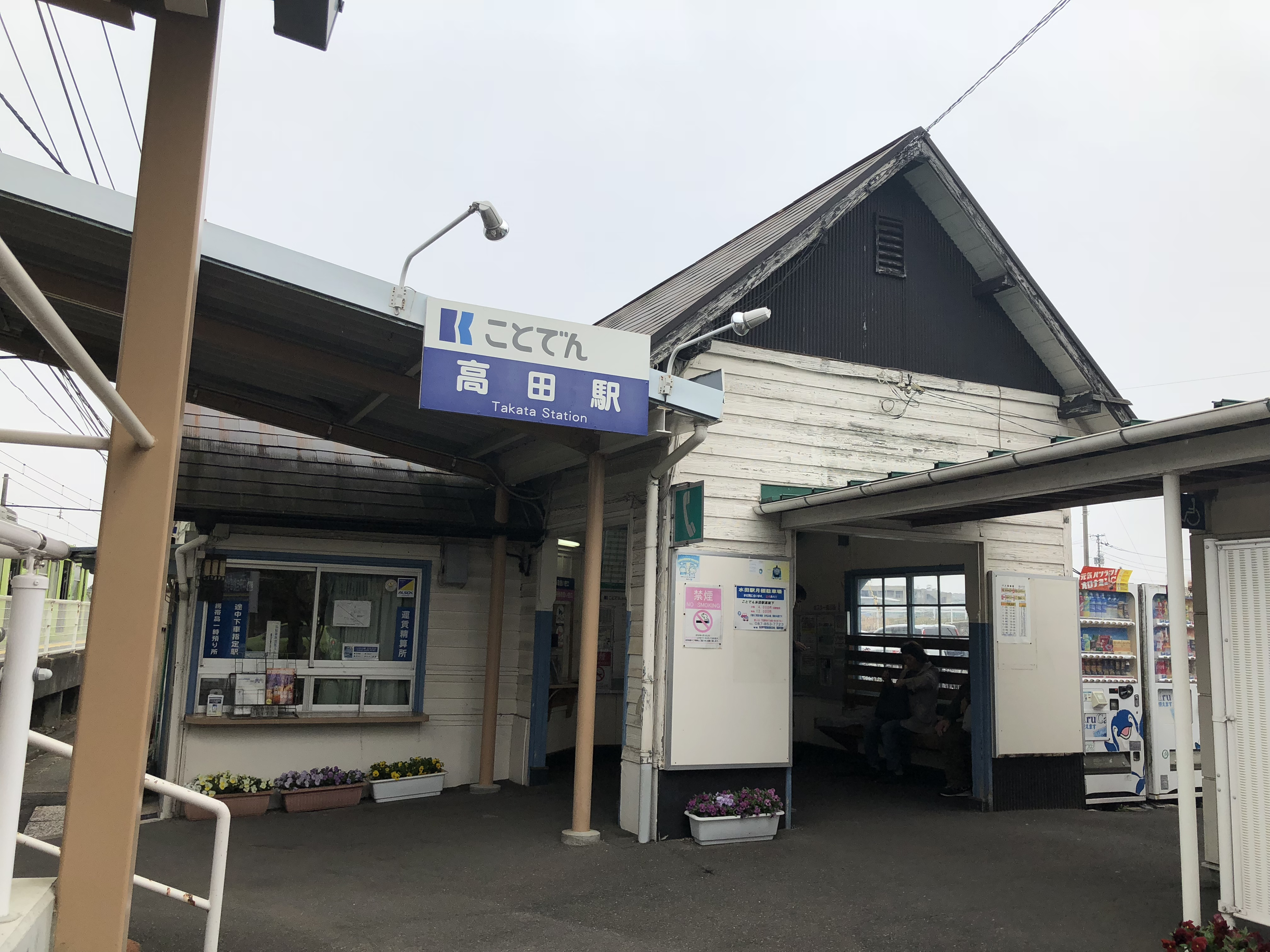
- Takata Station entrance

General information
- Location: Kamedachō, Takamatsu-shi, Kagawa-ken 761-0323; Japan
- Operator: Takamatsu-Kotohira Electric Railroad
- Line: ■ Nagao Line
- Distance: 8.3 km from Kawaramachi
- Platforms: 2 side platforms

Construction
- Structure type: At-grade
- Parking: Yes
- Cycle facilities: Yes
- Accessible: Yes

Other information
- Station code: N09

History
- Opened: April 30, 1912

Passengers
- FY2017: 1,435 per day
Location
- Location within Kagawa Prefecture Location within Japan

Takata Station (高田駅, Takata-eki) is a passenger railway station operated by the Takamatsu-Kotohira Electric Railroad in Takamatsu, Kagawa, Japan. It is operated by the private transportation company Takamatsu-Kotohira Electric Railroad (Kotoden) and is designated station "N09".

== Lines ==
Takata Station is a station on the Kotoden Nagao Line and is located 8.3 km from the terminus of the line at Kawaramachi Station and 10.0 kilometers from Takamatsu-Chikkō Station.

== Layout ==
The station consists of two opposed side platforms connected by a level crossing.

== Adjacent stations ==
←	Service	→
Nishi-Maeda	Nagao Line	Ikenobe

== History ==
Takata Station opened on April 30, 1912 as a station on the Takamatsu Electric Tramway. On November 1, 1943, it became a station on the Takamatsu-Kotohira Electric Railway.

== Surrounding area ==
- Kagawa University School of Medicine, Miki Campus (former Kagawa Medical University)
- Kagawa Prefectural Takamatsu Higashi High School
- Takamatsu City Maeda Elementary School

== Passenger statistics ==
Ridership per day
Year	Ridership
2011	1,343
2012	1,336
2013	1,368
2014	1,371
2015	1,442
2016	1,392
2017	1,435

== See also ==
- List of railway stations in Japan
