= Motoyama Station (Takamatsu) =

Railway station in Takamatsu, Kagawa Prefecture, Japan

Motoyama Station 元山駅
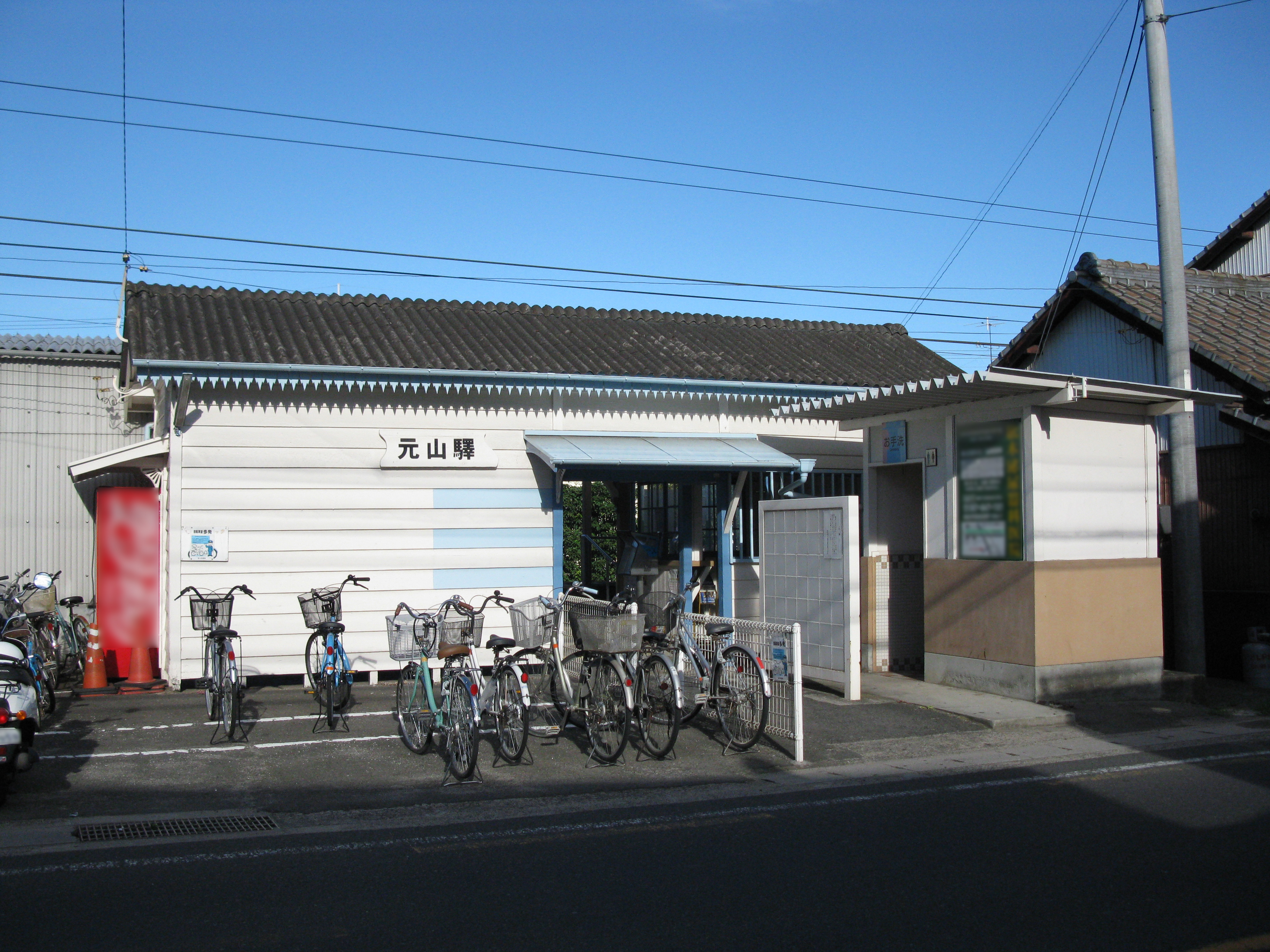
- Motoyama Station entrance, August 2007

General information
- Location: 981-3 Okuma, Motoyamacho, Takamatsu-shi, Kagawa-ken 761-0311; Japan
- Coordinates: 34.3104°N 134.0838°E
- Operator: Takamatsu-Kotohira Electric Railroad
- Line: ■ Nagao Line
- Distance: 4.5 km from Kawaramachi
- Platforms: 1 side platform

Construction
- Structure type: At-grade
- Parking: No
- Cycle facilities: Yes
- Accessible: Yes

Other information
- Status: Unstaffed
- Station code: N06

History
- Opened: April 30, 1912

Passengers
- FY2017: 854 per day
Location
- Location within Kagawa Prefecture Location within Japan

Motoyama Station (元山駅, Motoyama-eki) is a passenger railway station operated by the Takamatsu-Kotohira Electric Railroad in Takamatsu, Kagawa, Japan. It is operated by the private transportation company Takamatsu-Kotohira Electric Railroad (Kotoden) and is designated station "N06".

== Lines ==
Motoyama Station is a station on the Kotoden Nagao Line and is located 4.5 km from the terminus of the line at Kawaramachi Station and 6.2 kilometers from Takamatsu-Chikkō Station.

== Layout ==
The station consists of one side platform serving single bi-directional track. The station is unattended.

== Adjacent stations ==
←	Service	→
Kita-Higashiguchi	Nagao Line	Mizuta

== History ==
Motoyama Station opened on April 30, 1912, as a station on the Takamatsu Electric Tramway. On November 1, 1943, it became a station on the Takamatsu-Kotohira Electric Railway.

== Surrounding area ==
- Takamatsu Municipal Kyowa Junior High School

== Passenger statistics ==
Ridership per day
Year	Ridership
2011	634
2012	654
2013	695
2014	710
2015	772
2016	802
2017	854

== See also ==
- List of railway stations in Japan
