= 白山駅 =

白山駅 is the name of several train stations in Japan:

- Hakusan Station (Niigata)
- Hakusan Station (Tokyo)
- Shirayama Station
