= Shirayama Station =

Railway station in Miki, Kagawa Prefecture, Japan

Shirayama Station 白山駅
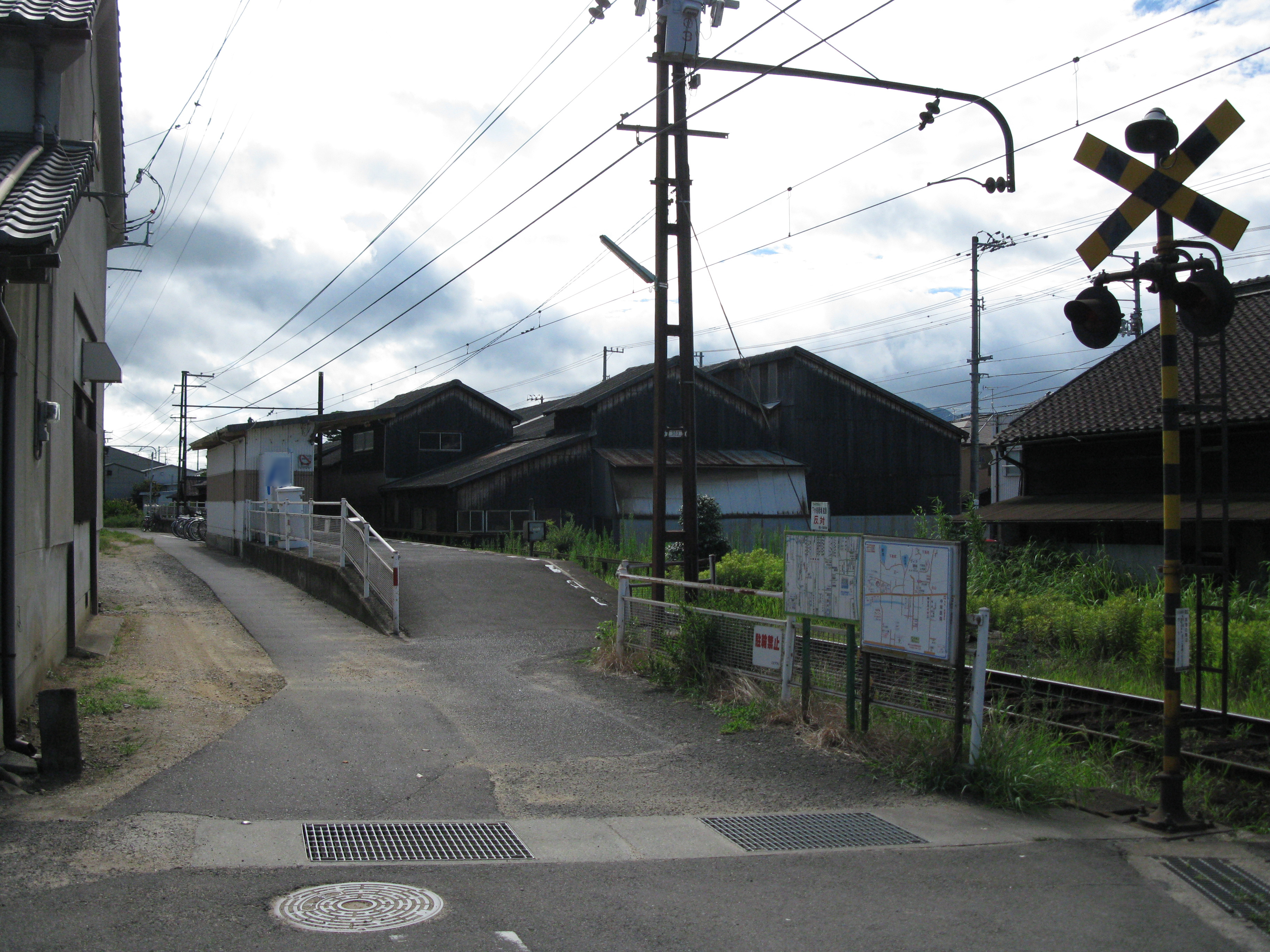
- Shirayama Station entrance

General information
- Location: Shimotakaoka, Miki-cho, Kita-gun, Kagawa-ken 761-0704; Japan
- Coordinates: 34.2668°N 134.1502°E
- Operator: Takamatsu-Kotohira Electric Railroad
- Line: ■ Nagao Line
- Distance: 12.8 km from Kawaramachi
- Platforms: 1 side platform

Construction
- Structure type: At-grade
- Parking: No
- Cycle facilities: Yes
- Accessible: Yes

Other information
- Station code: N14

History
- Opened: April 30, 1912

Passengers
- FY 2017: 265 per day (2017)
Location
- Location within Kagawa Prefecture Location within Japan

Shirayama Station (白山駅, Shirayama-eki) is a passenger railway station located in the town of in Miki, Kagawa, Japan. It is operated by the private transportation company Takamatsu-Kotohira Electric Railroad (Kotoden) and is designated station "N14".

== Lines ==
Shirayama Station is a station on the Kotoden Nagao Line and is located 12.8 km from the opposing terminus of the line at Kawaramachi and 14.5 kilometers from Takamatsu-Chikkō Station.

== Layout ==
The station consists of a single side platform serving one bi-directional track. The station is unattended and there is no station building, but only a shelter on each platform.

== Adjacent stations ==
←	Service	→
Gakuen-dōri	Nagao Line	Ido

== History ==
Shirayama Station opened on April 30, 1912 as a station of the Kotohira Electric Railway. On November 1, 1943 it became a station on the Takamatsu Kotohira Electric Railway Kotohira Line due to a company merger.

== Surrounding area ==
- Shirayama Jinja

== Passenger statistics ==
Ridership per day
Year	Ridership
2011	283
2012	257
2013	274
2014	255
2015	271
2016	275
2017	265

== See also ==
- List of railway stations in Japan
