= Kasugagawa Station =

Railway station in Takamatsu, Kagawa Prefecture, Japan

Kasugagawa Station 春日川駅
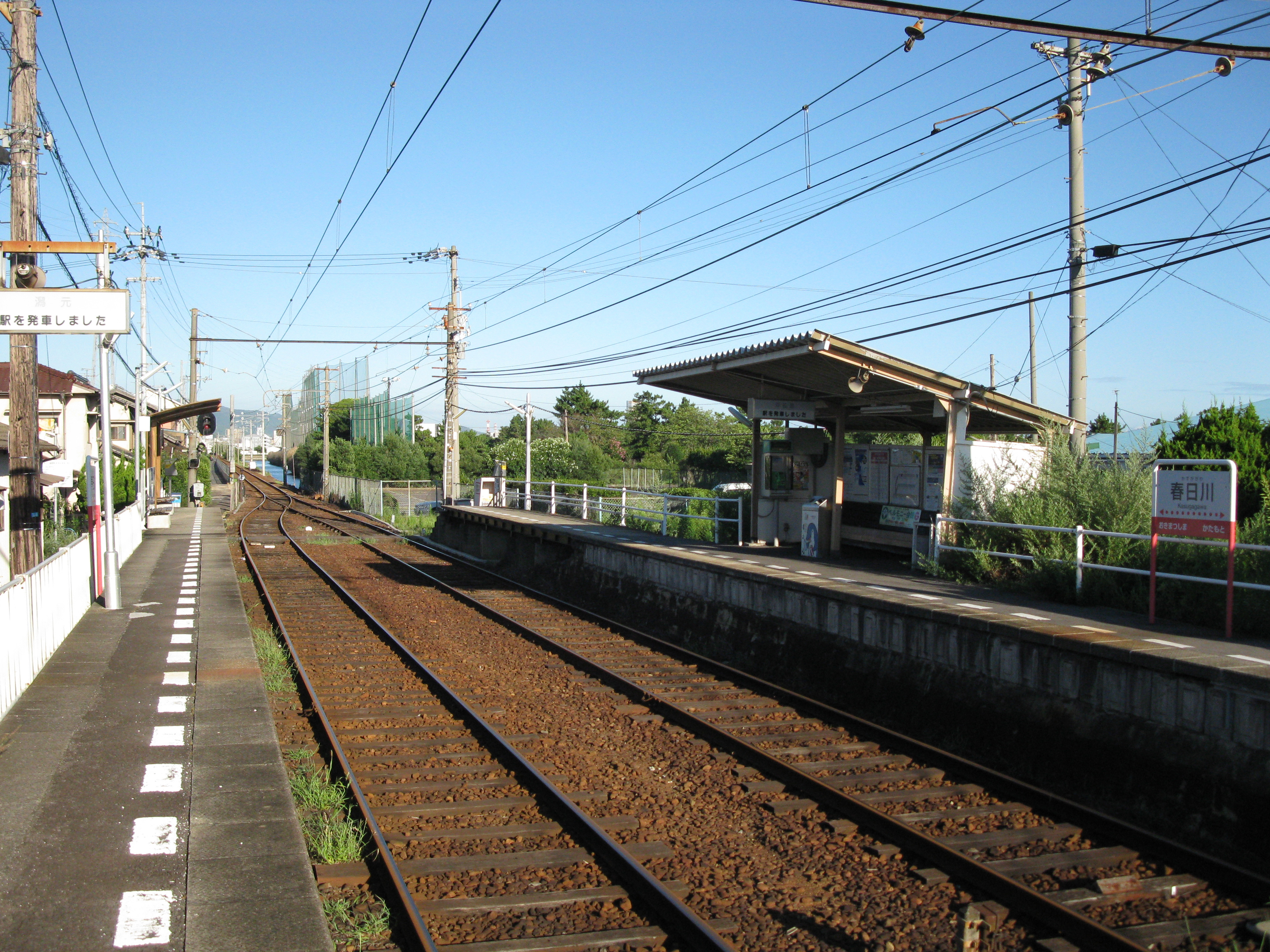
- Kasugagawa Station in August 2010

General information
- Location: Kitacho, Takamatsu-shi, Kagawa-ken 760-0080; Japan
- Coordinates: 34°20′27.5″N 134°5′0.8″E
- Operator: Takamatsu-Kotohira Electric Railroad
- Line: ■ Shido Line
- Distance: 3.0 km from Kawaramachi
- Platforms: 2 side platforms
- Tracks: 2

Other information
- Status: Unstaffed
- Station code: C04

History
- Opened: 18 November 1911

Passengers
- FY2018: 532 daily
Location
- Location within Kagawa Prefecture Location within Japan

Kasugagawa Station (春日川駅, Kasugagawa-eki) is a passenger railway station located in the city of Takamatsu, Kagawa, Japan. It is operated by the private transportation company Takamatsu-Kotohira Electric Railroad (Kotoden) and is designated station "S04".

== Lines ==
Kasugagawa Station is a station of the Kotoden Shido Line and is located 3.0 km from the opposing terminus of the line at Kawaramachi Station.

== Layout ==
Kasugagawa Station has two side platforms serving two tracks, connected by a level crossing. There is no station building. The station is unstaffed.

=== Platforms ===
1	■ Kotoden Shido Line	for Kawaramachi
2	■ Kotoden Shido Line	for Ōmachi, Kotoden-Shido

== Adjacent stations ==
«	Service	»
Kotoden Shido Line
Oki-Matsushima	Local	Katamoto

== History ==
Kasugagawa Station opened on November 18, 1911 on the Tosan Electric Tramway. On November 1, 1943 it became a station on the Takamatsu-Kotohira Electric Railway.

== Surrounding area ==
- Japan National Route 11
- Takamatsu Municipal Kitakita Elementary School

== See also ==
- List of railway stations in Japan
