= Katamoto Station =

Railway station in Takamatsu, Kagawa Prefecture, Japan

Katamoto Station 潟元駅
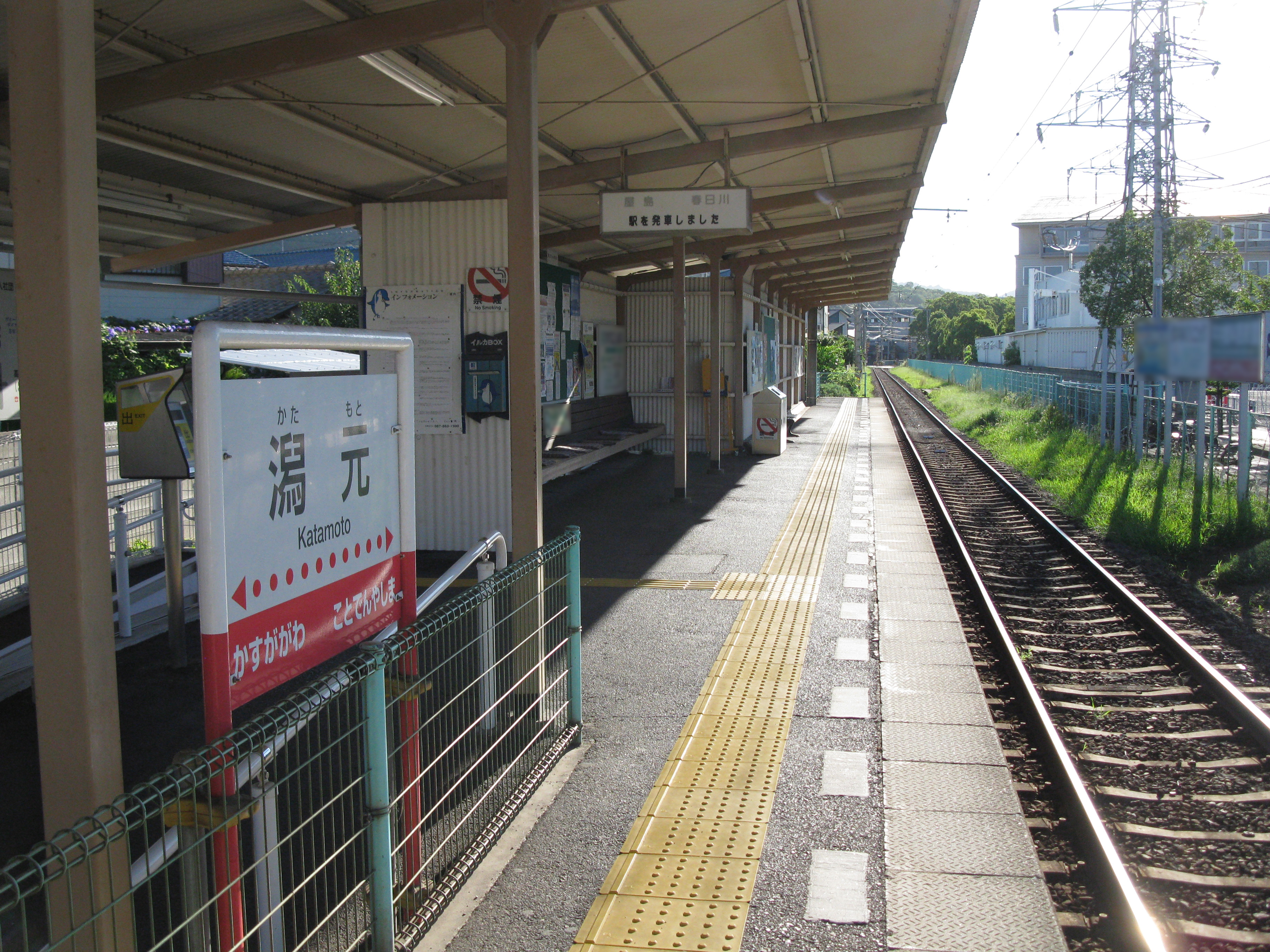
- Katamoto Station in August 2010

General information
- Location: Yashima Nishimachi, Takamatsu-shi, Kagawa-ken 761-0113; Japan
- Coordinates: 34°20′28.2″N 134°5′52.5″E
- Operator: Takamatsu-Kotohira Electric Railroad
- Line: ■ Shido Line
- Distance: 4.5 km from Kawaramachi
- Platforms: 1 side platform

Other information
- Status: Unstaffed
- Station code: C05

History
- Opened: 16 March 1931

Passengers
- FY2018: 1,869 daily
Location
- Location within Kagawa Prefecture Location within Japan

Katamoto Station (潟元駅, Katamoto-eki) is a passenger railway station located in the city of Takamatsu, Kagawa, Japan. It is operated by the private transportation company Takamatsu-Kotohira Electric Railroad (Kotoden) and is designated station "S05".

== Lines ==
Katamoto Station is a station of the Kotoden Shido Line and is located 4.5 km from the opposing terminus of the line at Kawaramachi Station.

== Layout ==
The station consists of one side platform serving a single bi-directional track. The station is unstaffed.

== Adjacent stations ==
«	Service	»
Kotoden Shido Line
Kasugagawa	Local	Kotoden-Yashima

== History ==
Katamoto Station opened on March 16, 1931.

== Surrounding area ==
- Japan National Route 11
- Shikoku Electric Power Training Institute
- Yashima General Hospital

== See also ==
- List of railway stations in Japan
