= Hanazono Station (Kagawa) =

Railway station in Takamatsu, Kagawa Prefecture, Japan

Hanazono Station 花園駅
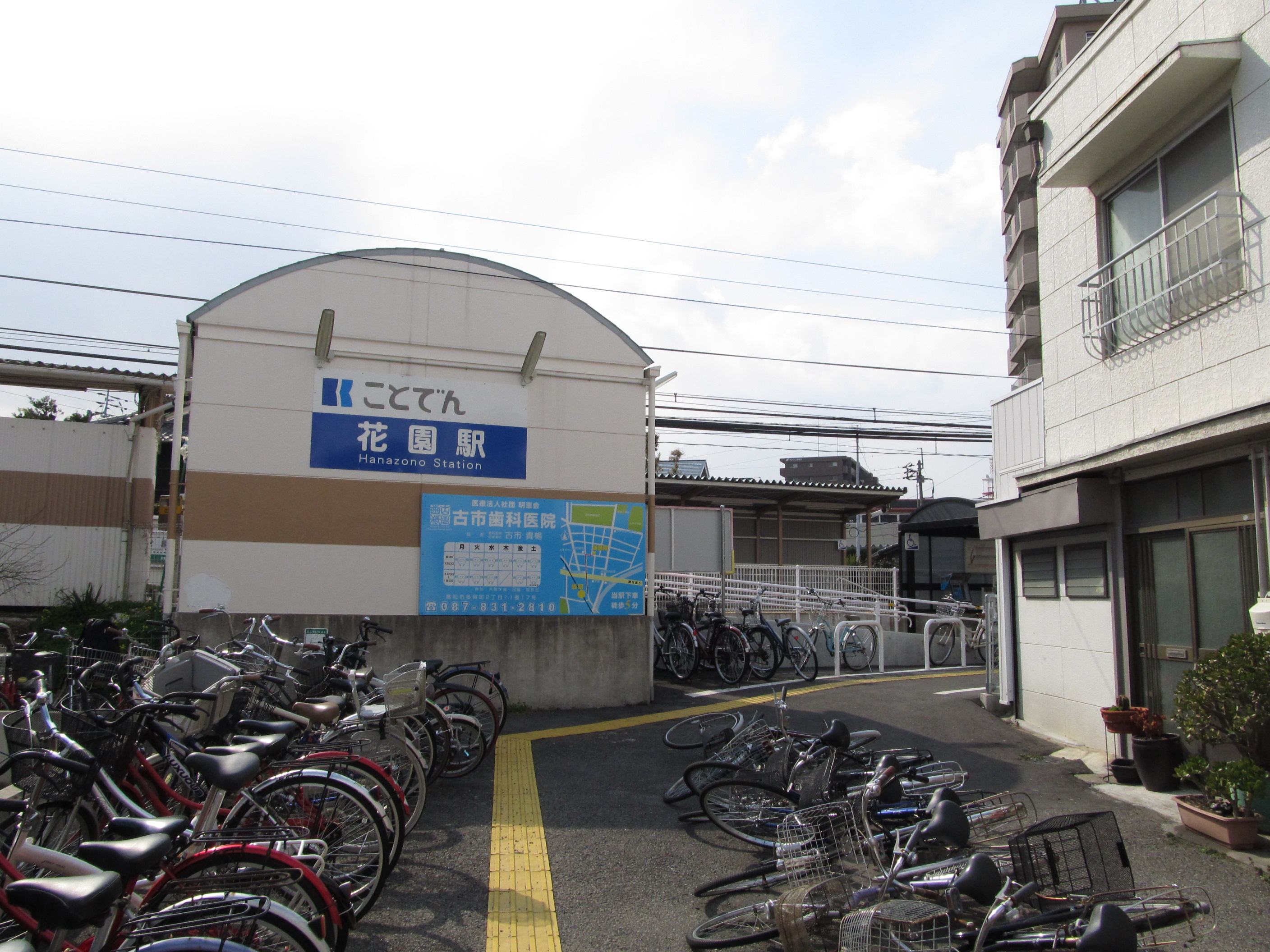
- Hanazono Station entrance

General information
- Location: 1-chōme-12 Hanazonochō, Takamatsu-shi, Kagawa-ken 760-0072; Japan
- Coordinates: 34.3341°N 134.0595°E
- Operator: Takamatsu-Kotohira Electric Railroad
- Line: ■ Nagao Line
- Distance: 0.9 km from Kawaramachi
- Platforms: 2 side platforms

Construction
- Structure type: At-grade
- Parking: No
- Cycle facilities: Yes
- Accessible: Yes

Other information
- Status: Unstaffed
- Station code: N03

History
- Opened: August 1, 1954

Passengers
- FY2017: 1,051 per day
Location
- Location within Kagawa Prefecture Location within Japan

Hanazono Station (花園駅, Hanazono-eki) is a passenger railway station operated by the Takamatsu-Kotohira Electric Railroad in Takamatsu, Kagawa, Japan. It is operated by the private transportation company Takamatsu-Kotohira Electric Railroad (Kotoden) and is designated station "N03".

== Lines ==
Hanazono Station is a station on the Kotoden Nagao Line and is located 0.9 km from the terminus of the line at Kawaramachi Station and 2.6 kilometers from Takamatsu-Chikkō Station.

== Layout ==
The station consists of two opposed side platforms connected by a level crossing. The station is unattended.

== Adjacent stations ==
←	Service	→
Kawaramachi	Nagao Line	Hayashimichi

== History ==
Hanazono Station opened on August 1, 1954.

== Surrounding area ==
- Kagawa Prefectural Route 43 Chutoku Mitani Takamatsu Line
- Kagawa Prefectural Road No. 155 Mure Chushin Line
- Takamatsu Municipal Hanazono Elementary School

== Passenger statistics ==
Ridership per day
Year	Ridership
2011	703
2012	698
2013	716
2014	735
2015	969
2016	1,097
2017	1,051

== See also ==
- List of railway stations in Japan
