= Miki, Kagawa =

Miki 三木町
- Town
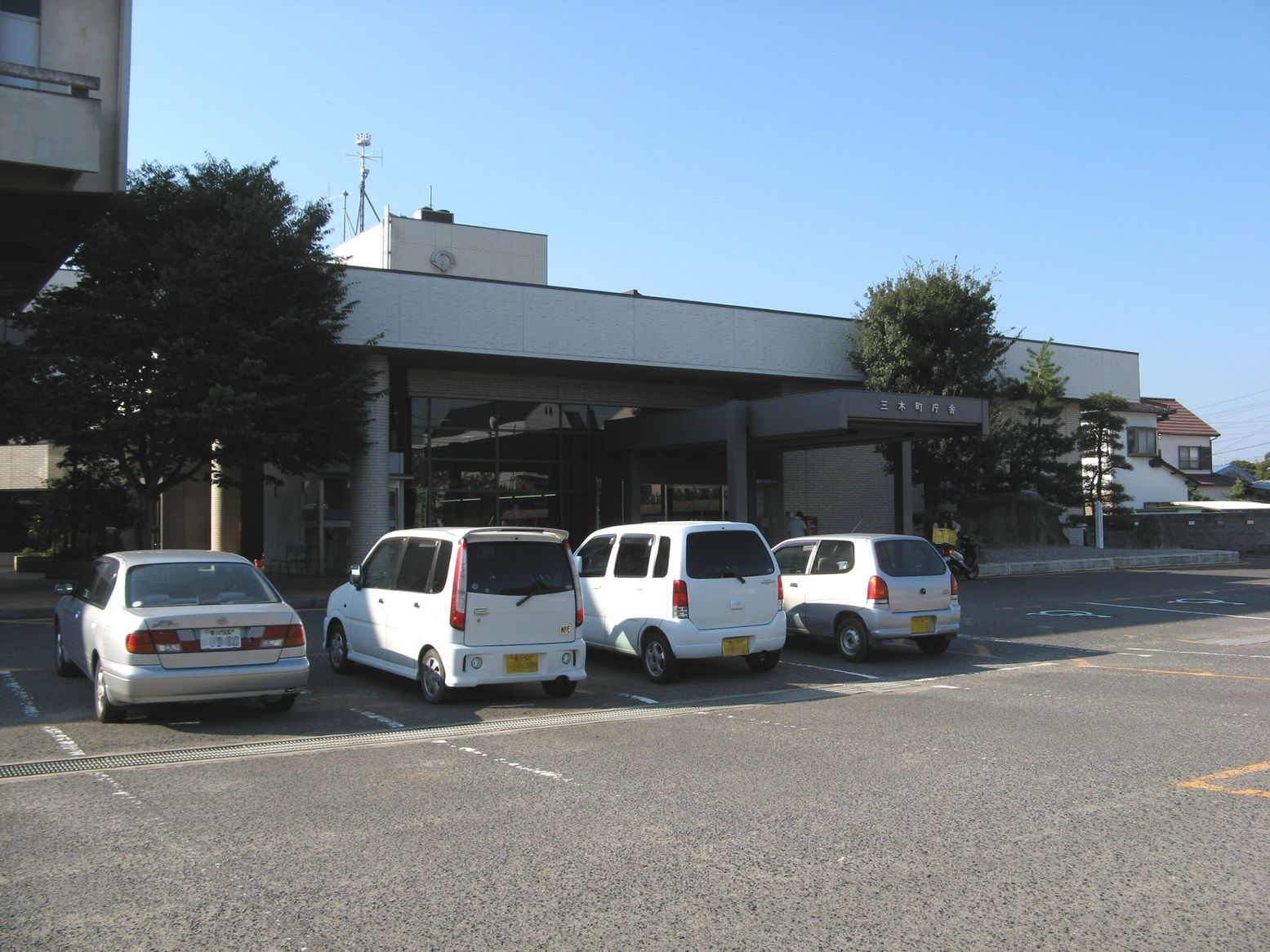
- Miki town hall

- Flag Chapter
- Interactive map of Miki
- Location in Japan
- Coordinates: 34°16′N 134°8′E
- Country: Japan
- Region: Shikoku
- Prefecture: Kagawa
- District: Kita

Government
  - Mayor: Yoshiharu Ito (since 2018)

Area
  - Total: 75.78 km^{2} (29.26 sq mi)

Population (September 1, 2022)
  - Total: 26,449
  - Density: 349.0/km^{2} (904.0/sq mi)
- Time zone: UTC+09:00 (JST)
- City hall address: 310 Hikami-Ōaza, Miki-cho, Kita-gun, Kagawa-ken 761-0692
- Website: Official website
- Symbols
- Flower: Chinese peony
- Tree: Kurogane holly

Miki (三木町, Miki-chō) is a town located in Kagawa Prefecture, Japan. As of 1 September 2022, the town had an estimated population of 26,449 in 10,963 households and a population density of 270 persons per km^{2}. The total area of the town is 75.78 square kilometres (29.26 sq mi).

== Geography ==
Miki is located in eastern Kagawa Prefecture on the island of Shikoku. The town area is long from north to south, and consists of hilly areas in the north, plains in the center, and mountainous areas in the south. It borders the prefectural capital, Takamatsu City, to the north, west, and southwest, Sanuki City to the east, and Mima City, Tokushima Prefecture to the southeast. From the northern part to the central and southern part, it is the basin of the Shinkawa River system, which originates from Mt. Kosen.

=== Neighbouring municipalities ===
Kagawa Prefecture

- Sanuki
- Takamatsu

Tokushima Prefecture

- Mima

=== Climate ===
Miki has a humid subtropical climate (Köppen Cfa) characterized by warm summers and cool winters with light snowfall. The average annual temperature in Miki is 15.3 °C. The average annual rainfall is 1606 mm with September as the wettest month. The temperatures are highest on average in January, at around 26.2 °C, and lowest in January, at around 5.0 °C.

== Demographics ==
Per Japanese census data, the population of Miki has remained relatively steady over the past half-century.

Historical population
Year	Pop.	±%
1970	23,308	—
1980	24,989	+7.2%
1990	26,966	+7.9%
2000	28,767	+6.7%
2010	28,464	−1.1%
2020	26,878	−5.6%

== History ==
The area of Miki was part of ancient Sanuki Province. During the Edo Period, the area was part of the holdings of Takamatsu. Following the Meiji restoration, the area was organized into villages with the creation of the modern municipalities system on 15 February 1890. The village of Hirai was raised to town status on 1 April 1919. The town of Miki was created on 1 October 1954 by merging the town of Hirai and the villages of Hikami, Kamiyama, Shimotakaoka and Tanaka. In 1956 the village of Ido also merged into Miki, but in 1959 residents in the northern part of Ido requested their portion be transferred to the town of Nagao (present-day Sanuki city).

== Government ==
Miki has a mayor-council form of government with a directly elected mayor and a unicameral town council of 16 members. Miki contributes one member to the Kagawa Prefectural Assembly. In terms of national politics, the town is part of Kagawa 2nd district of the lower house of the Diet of Japan.

== Economy ==
The local economy is based on a mixture of agriculture (rice, strawberries, asparagus, tomatoes, and other agricultural products), food processing and light manufacturing.

== Education ==
Miki has four public elementary schools and one public middle school operated by the town government, and one public high school operated by the Kagawa Prefectural Board of Education.

== Transportation ==
=== Railways ===
Takamatsu-Kotohira Electric Railroad Kotoden Nagao Line

- Ikenobe - Nōgakubumae - Hiragi - Gakuen-dōri - Shirayama - Ido - Kumonmyō

=== Highways ===
- Takamatsu Expressway
- National Route 11
- National Route 193
- National Route 377
