= Kataharamachi Station =

Kataharamachi Station may refer to:

- Kataharamachi Station (Kagawa) on the Kotoden Kotohira Line
- Kataharamachi Station (Toyama) on the Man'yōsen Takaoka Kidō Line
