= Shimotakaoka, Kagawa =

Dissolved municipality in Kagawa prefecture, Japan

Shimotakaoka (下高岡村, Shimtakaoka-mura) was a village located in Kita District, Kagawa, Japan. It was formed on the 15 February 1890 as a village of Miki District. On 1 April 1899 Miki District merged with the neighbouring Yamada District to create Kita District.

In October 1954 Shimotakaoka merged with some of the other municipalities within the district (the town of Hirai and the villages of Hikami, Kamiyama and Tanaka) to form the town of Miki.
