= Motoyama (disambiguation) =

Motoyama is a district in Nagoya, Japan.

Motoyama may also refer to:

- Motoyama, Kōchi, a town in Kōchi Prefecture, Japan

== People with the surname ==
- Atsuhiro Motoyama, Japanese video game music composer
- Hiroshi Motoyama (1925–2015), Japanese parapsychologist, scientist, spiritual instructor and author
- Satoshi Motoyama (born 1971), Japanese professional racing driver

== See also ==
- Motoyama Station (disambiguation), several train stations in Japan
