= Hikami, Kagawa =

Dissolved municipality in Kagawa prefecture, Japan

Hikami (氷上村, Hikami-mura) was a village located in Kita District, Kagawa, Japan. It was formed as a village of Miki District on 15 February 1890 upon the implementation of the Towns and Villages Act, from the merger of the former villages of Hikami and Kamitakaoka. On 1 April 1899, Miki District merged with the neighbouring Yamada District to create Kita District. On 1 January 1952 the Higashi-Ishizuka neighbourhood was transferred to Tanaka village.

In October 1954 Hikami merged with some of the other municipalities within the district (the town of Hirai and the villages of Kamiyama, Shimotakaoka and Tanaka) to form the town of Miki.
