= Kotoden Kotohira Line =

Railway line in Kagawa Prefecture, Japan

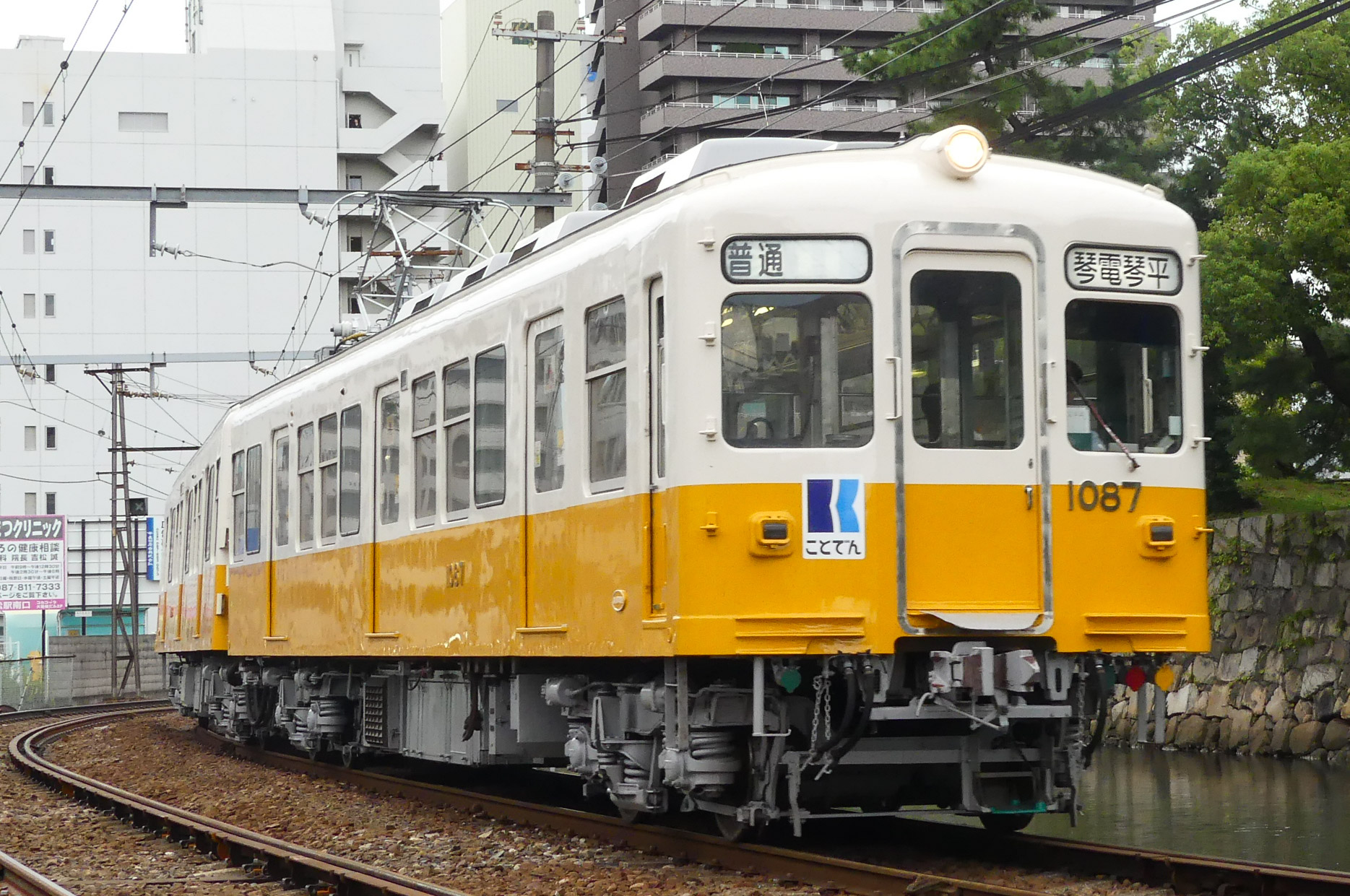
- Kotohira Line 1080 series EMU, September 2018

Overview
- Owner: Takamatsu-Kotohira Electric Railroad
- Locale: Kagawa Prefecture
- Termini: Takamatsu-Chikkō; Kotoden-Kotohira
- Stations: 22

History
- Opened: 21 December 1926; 99 years ago

Technical
- Line length: 32.9 km (20.4 mi)
- Num of tracks: Single (double track between Takamatsu-Chikkō and Ritsurin-Kōen)
- Track gauge: 1,435 mm (4 ft 8 1/2 in)
- Minimum radius: 120 m
- Electrification: 1,500 V DC, overhead catenary
- Operating speed: 85 km/h (55 mph)

A train running on the Kotoden Kotohira Line, 2021

The Kotoden Kotohira Line (琴電琴平線, Kotoden Kotohira-sen) is a Japanese railway line in Kagawa Prefecture, which connects Takamatsu-Chikkō Station in Takamatsu with Kotoden-Kotohira Station in Kotohira. It is owned and operated by the Takamatsu-Kotohira Electric Railroad. The line color is yellow.

== History ==
The line first opened on 21 December 1926 between Ritsurin-Kōen and Takinomiya. The line was later extended on both sides to Kotoden-Kotohira and Kawarachō in 1927.

Since the beginning of the 21st century, three new stations have opened: Kūkōdōri on 29 July 2006, Ayagawa on 15 December 2013, and Fuseishi on 28 November 2020. Currently, a new station named Tahi Station is planned to open in 2026.

== Stations ==
All stations are located in Kagawa Prefecture.

- * indicates staffed station.

No.	Picture	Name	Japanese	Distance (km)		Connections	Location
No.	Picture	Name	Japanese	between stations	from Takamatsu-Chikkō	Connections	Location
K00		Takamatsu-Chikkō*	高松築港	-	0.0	Kōtoku Line, Yosan Line (Takamatsu Station)	Takamatsu
K01		Kataharamachi*	片原町	0.9	0.9		Takamatsu
K02		Kawaramachi*	瓦町	0.8	1.7	■ Kotoden Nagao Line (N02) ■ Kotoden Shido Line (S00)	Takamatsu
↓ Through services to/from Nagao via the Nagao Line ↓
K03		Ritsurin-Kōen*	栗林公園	1.2	2.9		Takamatsu
K04		Sanjō*	三条	1.0	3.9		Takamatsu
K04A		Fuseishi*	伏石	1.1	5.0		Takamatsu
K05		Ōta*	太田	1.2	6.2		Takamatsu
K05A		Tahi (Note: Planned to open in February 2027)	多肥	? (Note: No data)	? (Note: No data)		Takamatsu
K06		Busshōzan*	仏生山	1.8	8.0		Takamatsu
K07		Kūkō-dōri	空港通り	1.0	9.0		Takamatsu
K08		Ichinomiya*	一宮	1.0	10.0		Takamatsu
K09		Enza	円座	1.2	11.2		Takamatsu
K10		Okamoto	岡本	2.6	13.8		Takamatsu
K11		Kazashigaoka	挿頭丘	1.2	15.0		Ayagawa
K12		Hatada	畑田	0.8	15.8		Ayagawa
K13		Sue	陶	2.5	18.3		Ayagawa
K14		Ayagawa (Aeon mall Ayagawa)	綾川 (イオンモール綾川)	1.5	19.8		Ayagawa
K15		Takinomiya*	滝宮	0.9	20.7		Ayagawa
K16		Hayuka	羽床	2.1	22.8		Ayagawa
K17		Kurikuma	栗熊	1.8	24.6		Marugame
K18		Okada	岡田	2.6	27.2		Marugame
K19		Hazama	羽間	1.9	29.1		Mannō
K20		Enai	榎井	2.5	31.6		Kotohira
K21		Kotoden-Kotohira*	琴電琴平	1.3	32.9	Dosan Line (Kotohira Station)	Kotohira

=== Ridership ===
No.	Station	Passengers
K00	Takamatsu-Chikkō	11,166
K01	Kataharamachi	4,589
K02	Kawaramachi	13,074
K03	Ritsurin-Kōen	2,832
K04	Sanjō	2,304
K04A	Fuseishi	2,405
K05	Ōta	3,188
K06	Busshōzan	3,292
K07	Kūkō-dōri	1,171
K08	Ichinomiya	1,495
K09	Enza	1,592
K10	Ōkamoto	637
K11	Kazashigaoka	338
K12	Hatada	203
K13	Sue	482
K14	Ayakawa	1,400
K15	Takinomiya	480
K16	Hayuka	125
K17	Kurikuma	528
K18	Okada	443
K19	Hazama	237
K20	Enai	257
K21	Kotoden-Kotohira	1,143
