= Nagao Station (Kagawa) =

Railway station in Sanuki, Kagawa prefecture, Japan

Nagao Station 長尾駅
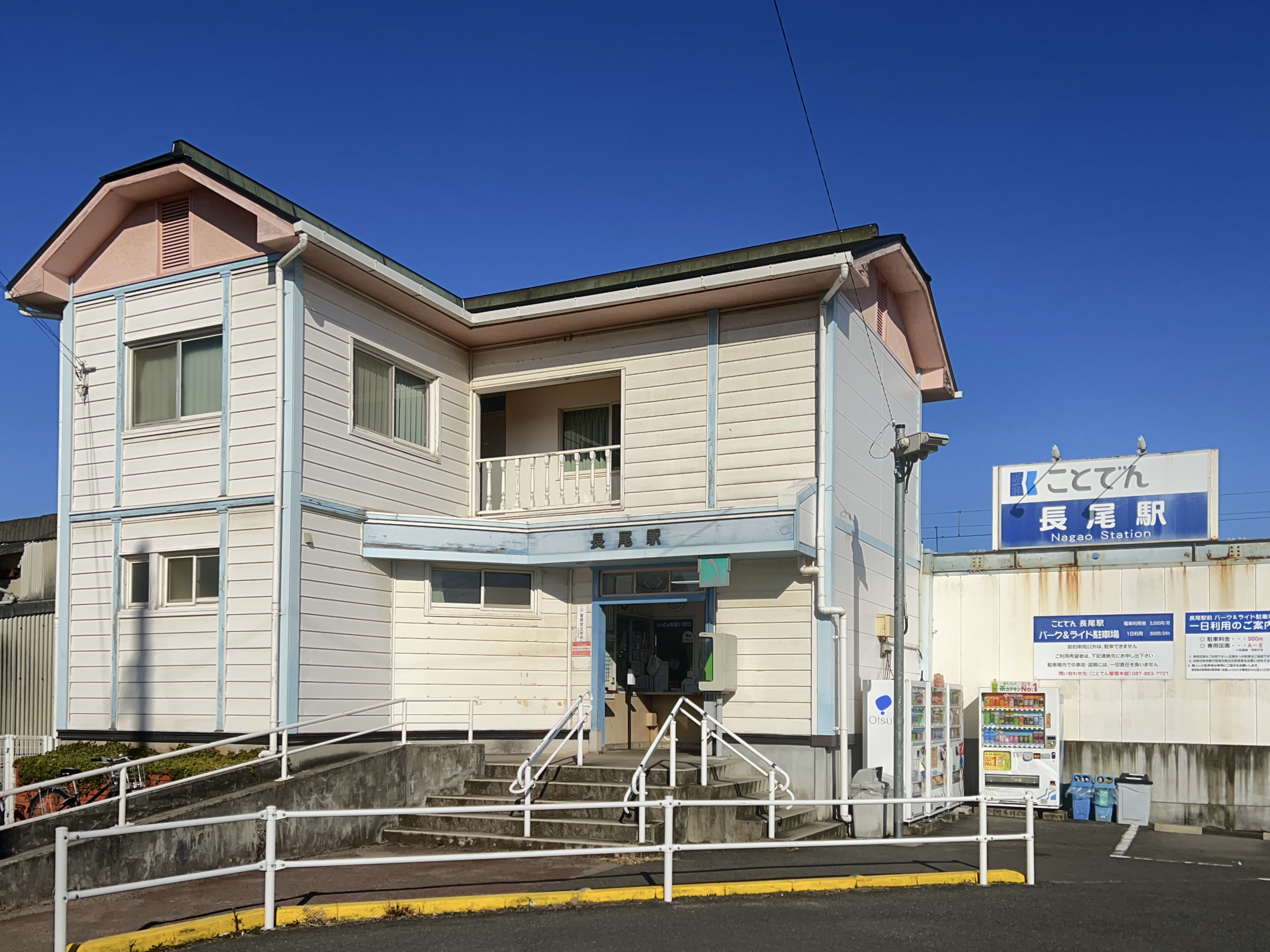
- Nagao Station exterior, January 2022

General information
- Location: 559-2 Nagao-Nishi, Sanuki-shi, Kagawa-ken 769-2302; Japan
- Coordinates: 34°15′59.8″N 134°10′9.8″E
- Operator: Takamatsu-Kotohira Electric Railroad
- Line: ■ Nagao Line
- Distance: 14.6 km from Kawaramachi
- Platforms: 1 side platform
- Connections: Bus stop

Other information
- Station code: N17

History
- Opened: April 30, 1912

Passengers
- FY2017: 1,074 per day
Location
- Location within Kagawa Prefecture Location within Japan

Nagao Station (長尾駅, Nagao-eki) is a passenger railway station operated by the Takamatsu-Kotohira Electric Railroad in the city of Sanuki, Kagawa, Japan. It is operated by the private transportation company Takamatsu-Kotohira Electric Railroad (Kotoden) and is designated station "N17".

== Lines ==
Nagao Station is a terminus of the Kotoden Nagao Line and is located 14.6 km from the opposing terminus of the line at Kawaramachi Station and 16.3 kilometers from Takamatsu-Chikkō Station.

== Layout ==
The station consists of a single side platform serving one track. An additional storage track is situated on the north side. The station is staffed.

== Adjacent stations ==
«	Service	»
Kotoden Nagao Line
Kumonmyō	Local	Terminus

== History ==
Nagao Station opened on 30 April 1912.

== Surrounding area ==
- Nagao-ji (Temple No.87 on the Shikoku Pilgrimage)
- Sanuki City Hall Nagao Branch Office (former Nagao Town Hall)
- Sanuki Municipal Nagao Elementary School

== See also ==
- List of railway stations in Japan
