= Kotoden Nagao Line =

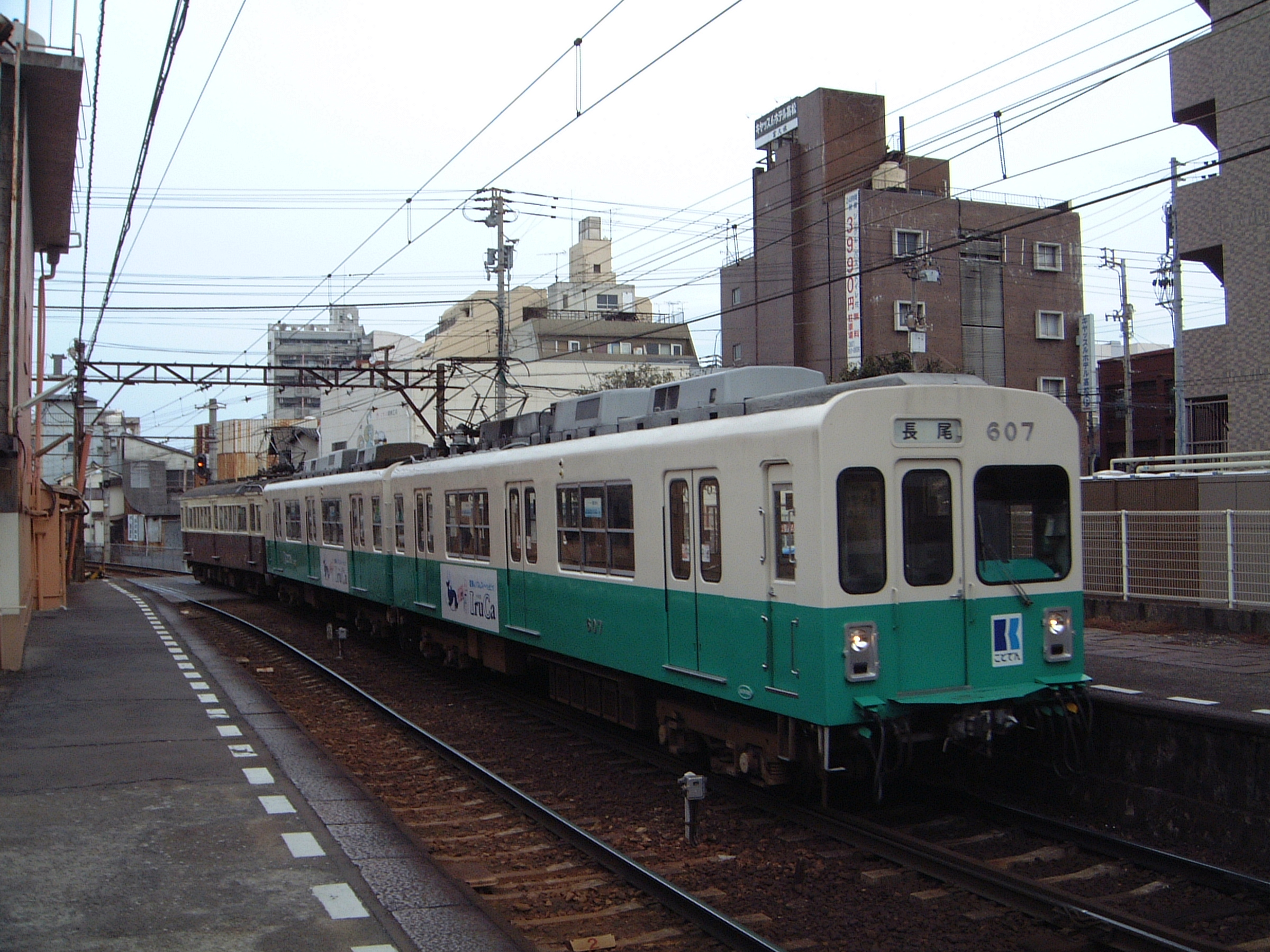
- Kotoden Nagao Line EMU, January 2006

Overview
- Owner: Takamatsu-Kotohira Electric Railroad
- Locale: Kagawa Prefecture
- Termini: Kawaramachi; Nagao
- Stations: 16

History
- Opened: 30 April 1912; 114 years ago

Technical
- Line length: 14.6 km (9.1 mi)
- Num of tracks: Single
- Track gauge: 1,435 mm (4 ft 8 1/2 in)
- Minimum radius: 109 m
- Electrification: 1,500 V DC, overhead catenary
- Operating speed: 65 km/h (40 mph)

(video) Time-lapse from Mizuta Station to Nagao Station.

The Kotoden Nagao Line (琴電長尾線, Kotoden Nagao-sen) is a Japanese railway line in Kagawa Prefecture, which connects Kawaramachi Station in Takamatsu with Nagao Station in Sanuki. It is owned and operated by the Takamatsu-Kotohira Electric Railroad. The line color is green.

== Station list ==
All stations are located in Kagawa Prefecture. Station number "N00" is used for Takamatsu-Chikkō Station, and "N01" is for Kataharamachi Station on the Kotohira Line.

No.	Name	Japanese	Distance (km)		Connections	Location
No.	Name	Japanese	between stations	from Kawaramachi	Connections	Location
↑ Through services to/from Takamatsu-Chikkō via the Kotohira Line ↑
N02	Kawaramachi	瓦町	-	0.0	■ Kotoden Kotohira Line (K02) (through service) ■ Kotoden Shido Line (S00)	Takamatsu
N03	Hanazono	花園	0.9	0.9		Takamatsu
N04	Hayashimichi	林道	1.8	2.7		Takamatsu
N05	Kita-Higashiguchi	木太東口	0.7	3.4		Takamatsu
N06	Motoyama	元山	1.1	4.5		Takamatsu
N07	Mizuta	水田	1.3	5.8		Takamatsu
N08	Nishi-Maeda	西前田	1.4	7.2		Takamatsu
N09	Takata	高田	1.1	8.3		Takamatsu
N10	Ikenobe	池戸	1.3	9.6		Miki Kita District
N11	Nōgakubumae	農学部前	0.8	10.4		Miki Kita District
N12	Hiragi	平木	0.5	10.9		Miki Kita District
N13	Gakuen-dōri	学園通り	0.6	11.5		Miki Kita District
N14	Shirayama	白山	1.3	12.8		Miki Kita District
N15	Ido	井戸	0.5	13.3		Miki Kita District
N16	Kumonmyō	公文明	0.6	13.9		Miki Kita District
N17	Nagao	長尾	0.7	14.6		Sanuki

== History ==
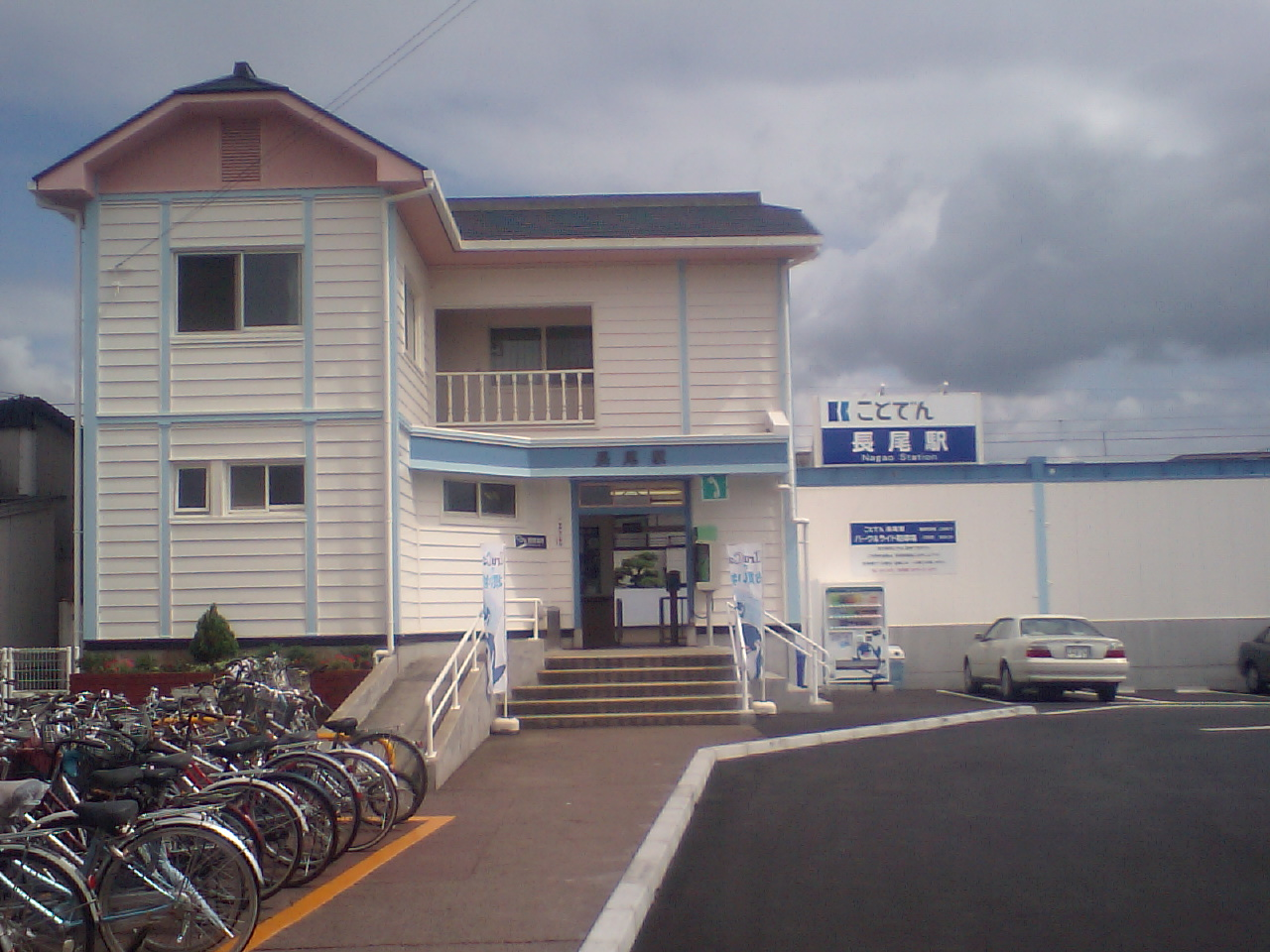
Nagao Station on the Kotoden Nagao Line

The line first opened as the Takamatsu Electric Tramway (高松電気軌道, Takamatsu Denki Kidō) on 30 April 1912 between Dehare (出晴) (close to the present Kawaramachi Station) and Nagao. The line was originally 1,067 mm (3 ft 6 in) gauge and electrified at 600 V DC, but it was regauged to 1,435 mm (4 ft 8 1/2 in) in June 1945, and the overhead line voltage was raised to 1,500 V from December 1976.
