= Kawaramachi Station (Kagawa) =

Railway station in Takamatsu, Kagawa Prefecture, Japan

Kawaramachi Station 瓦町駅
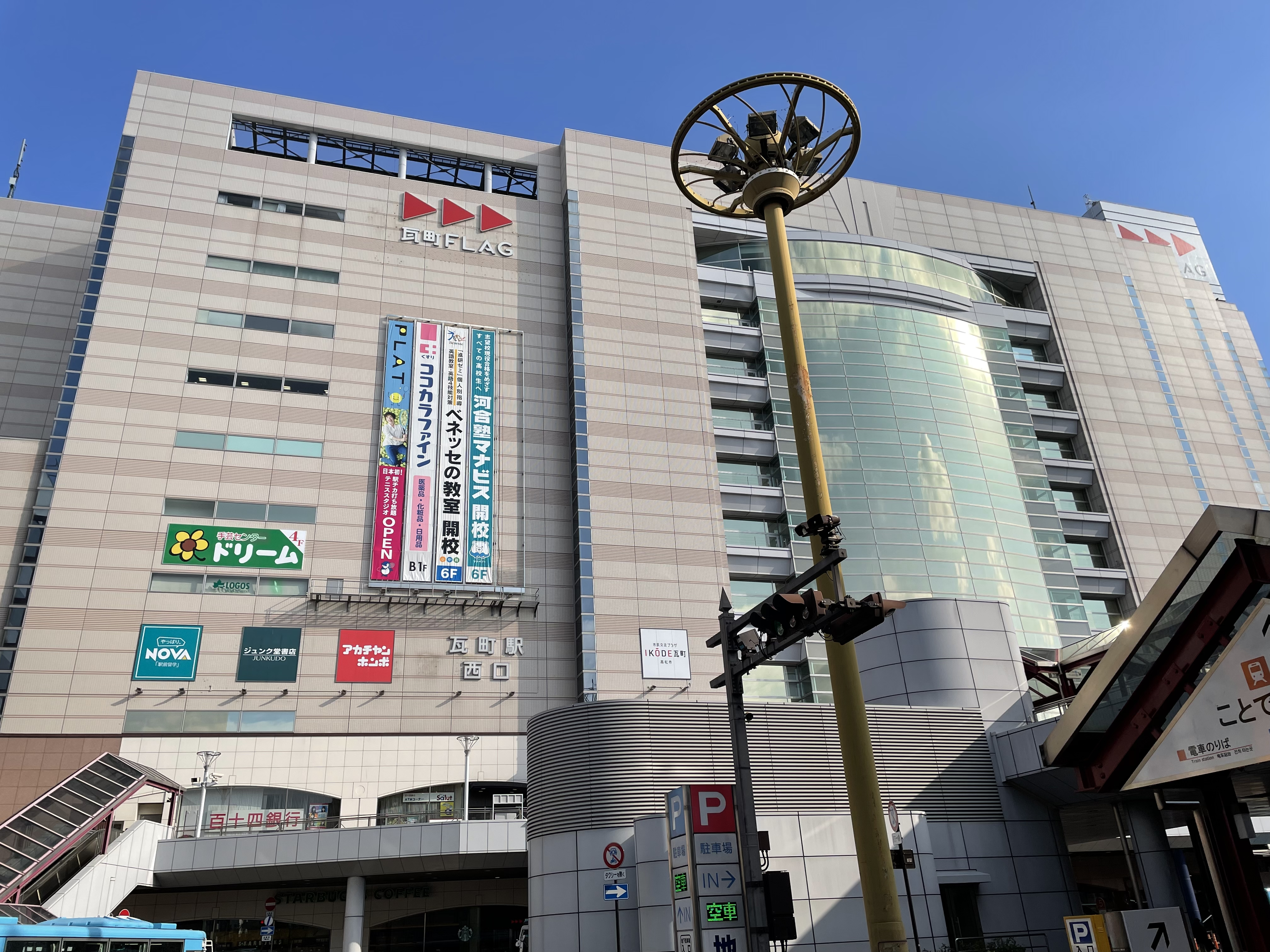
- Kawaramachi Station exterior, February 2022

General information
- Location: 1-chome Tokiwacho, Takamatsu-shi, Kagawa-ken 760-0054; Japan
- Coordinates: 34°20′21″N 134°3′9.5″E
- Operator: Kotoden
- Lines: ■ Kotohira Line; ■ Nagao Line; ■ Shido Line
- Platforms: 1 side + 2 island platforms
- Connections: Bus stop

Construction
- Structure type: Elevated
- Cycle facilities: Yes
- Accessible: Yes

Other information
- Station code: K02 (Kotohira Line); N02 (Nagao Line); S00 (Shido Line)

History
- Opened: 22 April 1915
- Former names: Takamatsu (to 1941); Kotoden Takamatsu (to 1954)

Passengers
- FY2017: 14,223 per day

Services
Preceding station	Kotoden	Following station
Kataharamachi towards Takamatsu-Chikkō	Kotohira Line	Ritsurin-Kōen towards Kotoden-Kotohira
through to Kotohira Line	Nagao Line	Hanazono towards Nagao
Terminus	Shido Line	Imabashi towards Kotoden-Shido
Location
- Location within Kagawa Prefecture Location within Japan

Kawaramachi Station (瓦町駅, Kawaramachi-eki) is a railway station located in the city of Takamatsu, Kagawa, Japan. It is operated by the private transportation company Takamatsu-Kotohira Electric Railroad (Kotoden) and has station designations "K02", "N02" and "S00".

== Lines ==
Kawaramachi Station is served by the Kotoden Kotohira Line, Kotoden Nagao Line, and Kotoden Shido Line. It forms the terminus of the 14.6 kilometer Kotoden Nagao Line to Nagao and the 12.5 kilometer Kotoden Shido Line to Kotoden-Shido, although many Nagao Line services start and terminate at Takamatsu-Chikkō Station. It is located 32.9 km from the opposing terminus of the Kotohira line at Kotoden-Kotohira Station.

== Layout ==
The station is an elevated station integrated with the Kotoden Kawaramachi Building completed in 1996, and the Kotohira Line and Nagao Line platforms are located on the first floor of the building. The Kotohira Line has one island platform and two tracks (platforms 1 and 2), and the Nagao Line has one side platform and one track (platform 3). The Nagao Line joins the Kotohira Line on the Kataharamachi side. Also, on the Hanazono side, there are siding tracks with effective lengths of 6 cars and 4 cars. The Shido Line has two tracks (platforms 4 and 5) on one side of the deadheaded platform across the road in the northeastern part of the building, and only platform 4 is used for trains arriving and departing during non-rush hours. The tracks are not connected to the Kotohira and Nagao lines. The Kotohira Line/Nagao Line platform is connected by a connecting walkway on the second floor above ground. There are two ticket gates, one on the second floor of the station building and the other on the ground floor at the end of the Shido Line platform. All lines can be used from both ticket gates.

== Platforms ==
1	■ Kotoden Kotohira Line	for Takamatsu-Chikkō
2	■ Kotoden Kotohira Line	for Ritsurin-Kōen, Busshōzan, Takinomiya, and Kotoden-Kotohira
3	■ Kotoden Nagao Line	for Nagao and Takamatsu-Chikkō
4/5	■ Kotoden Shido Line	for Kotoden-Yashima, Yakuri, and Kotoden-Shido

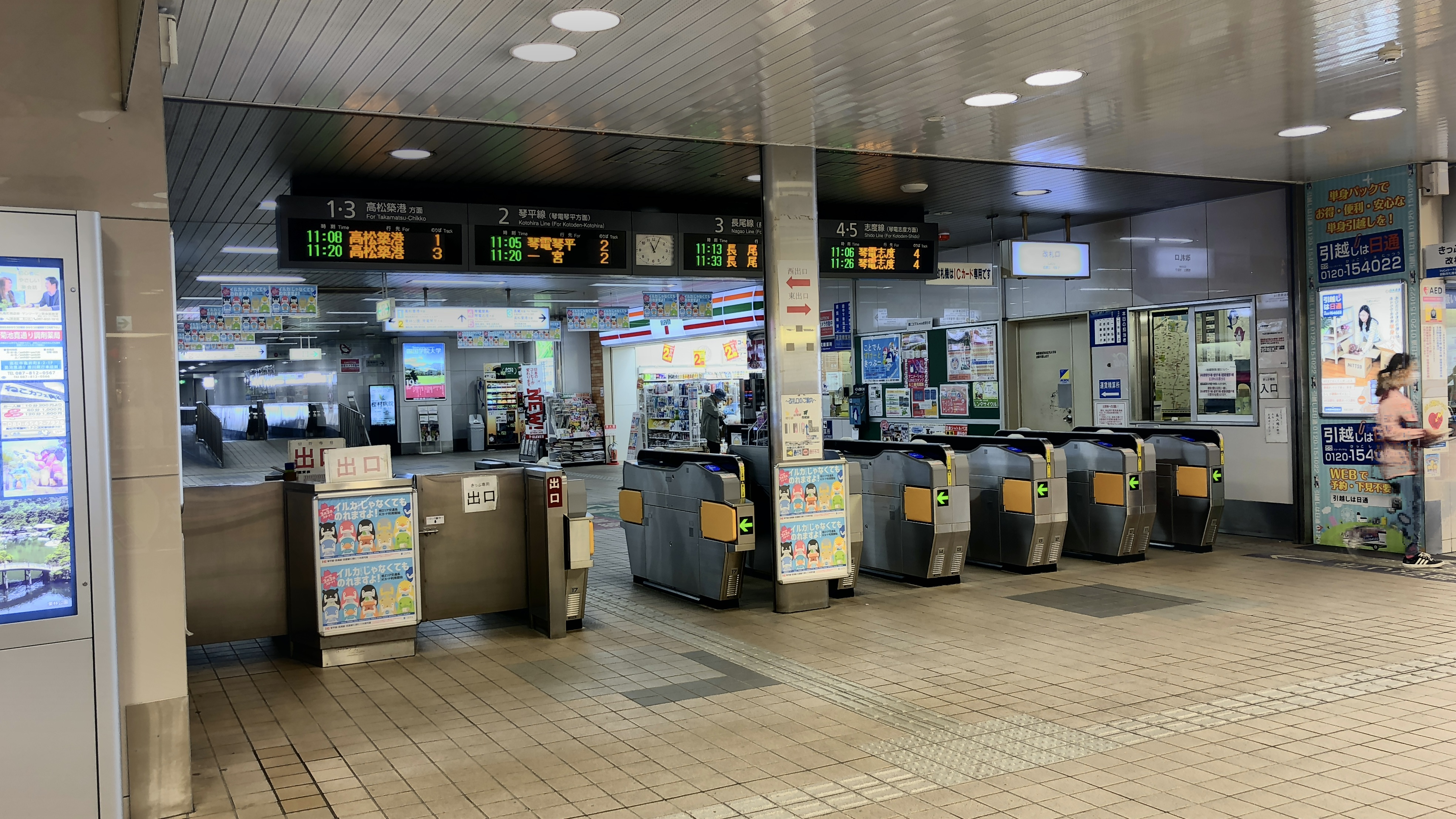
The ticket barriers in April 2018

== History ==
Kawaramachi Station opened on 22 April 1915. It was renamed Takamatsu Station (高松駅) on 22 April 1927 and Kotoden Takamatsu Station (琴電高松駅) in August 1941, before reverting to its original name on 1 January 1954.

== Surrounding area ==
- Takamatsu Central Shopping Street
- Jobancho Shopping Street
- Minamishinmachi Shopping Street
- Takamatsu City Hall

== See also ==
- List of railway stations in Japan
