= Takamatsu-Chikkō Station =

Railway station in Takamatsu, Kagawa Prefecture, Japan

Takamatsu-Chikkō Station 高松築港駅
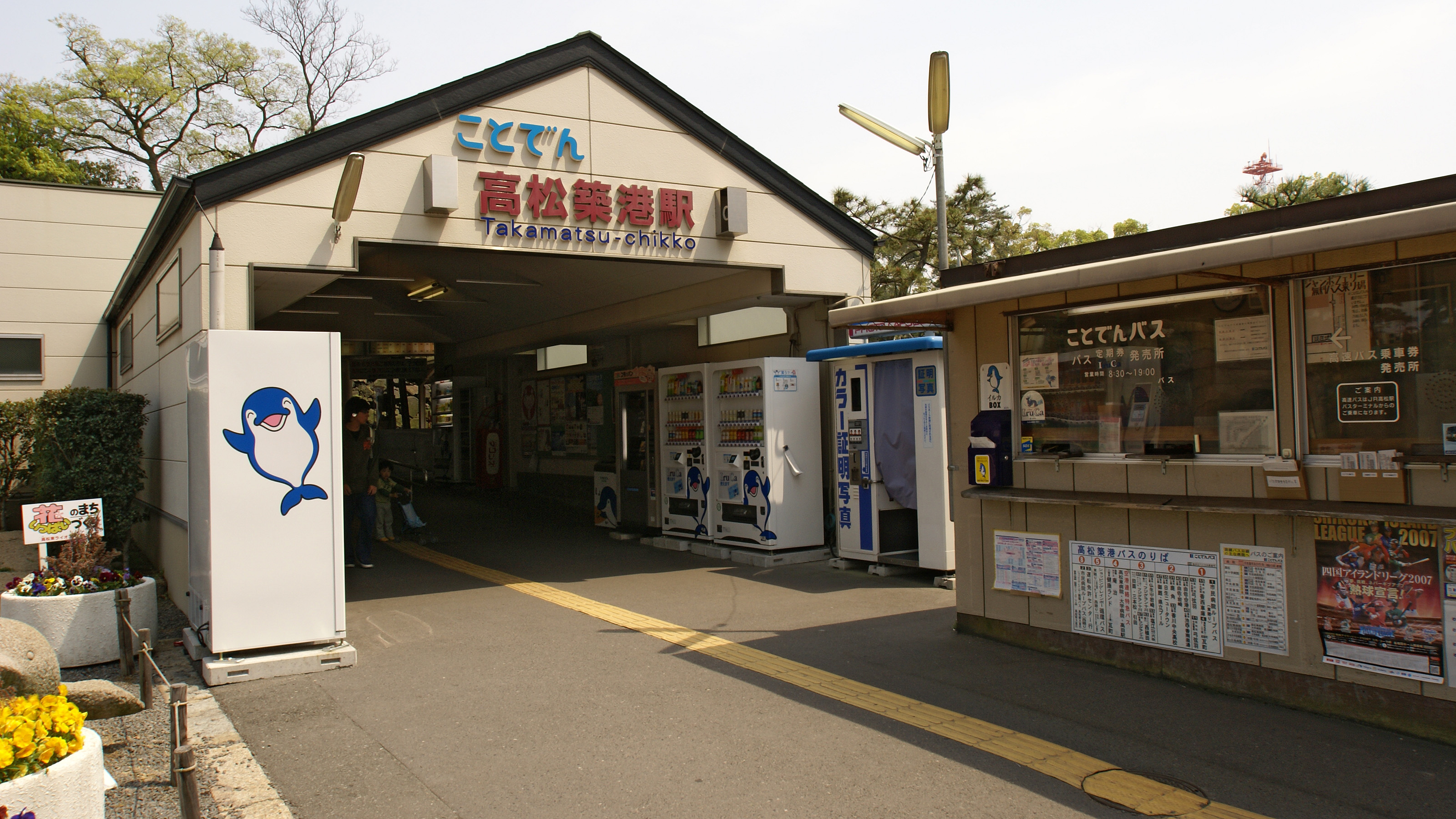
- Takamatsu-Chikkō Station entrance

General information
- Location: 1-5-20 Kotobuki-cho, Takamatsu-shi, Kagawa-ken; Japan
- Coordinates: 34.3459°N 134.0544°E
- Operator: Takamatsu-Kotohira Electric Railroad
- Lines: ■ Kotohira Line ■ Nagao Line
- Platforms: 1 island + 1 side platform
- Connections: JR Shikoku (via Takamatsu): ■ Yosan Line ■ Kōtoku Line

Construction
- Structure type: At-grade
- Parking: No
- Cycle facilities: No
- Accessible: Yes

Other information
- Station code: K00 (Kotohira Line); N00 (Nagao Line)

History
- Opened: December 26, 1948
- Former names: Chikkō (to 1954)

Passengers
- FY2017: 12,223 per day
Location
- Location within Kagawa Prefecture Location within Japan

Takamatsu-Chikkō Station (高松築港駅, Takamatsu-Chikkō-eki) is a passenger railway station operated by the Takamatsu-Kotohira Electric Railroad in Takamatsu, Kagawa, Japan. It is operated by the private transportation company Takamatsu-Kotohira Electric Railroad (Kotoden) and is designated station "K00" and "N00".

== Lines ==
Takamatsu-Chikkō Station is a terminal station on the Kotoden Kotohira Line and is located 32.9kilometers from the opposing terminus at Kotoden-Kotohira. It is also the terminal station for the Kotoden Nagao Line and is located 16.3 km from the terminus of the line at Nagao, although the "official" terminus of the line is actually at Kawaramachi Station and 2.5 kilometers from Takamatsu-Chikkō.

== Layout ==
The station consists of two bay platforms serving three tracks.

== Adjacent stations ==
←	Service	→
Terminus	Kotohira Line	Kataharamachi
Terminus	Nagao Line	Kataharamachi

== History ==
The section between Kawaramachi and this station on the Kotohira Line was fully opened at the end of 1948 after the war as a substitute route for the city line that was abolished due to the damage caused by the air raids on Takamatsu. Before that, this site was the moat of Takamatsu Castle, and the moat, which is now adjacent to Platform 1, continued to the site of this station. Takamatsu-Chikkō Station opened on December 26, 1948 as Chikkō Station. It was treated as a temporary station until the current station was completed. On January 1, 1954, the name was changed to Takamatsu-Chikkō Station. It was relocated 210 meters north of its original location on September 10, 1955. In 2000 the station building was reconstructed.

== Surrounding area ==
- Takamatsu Port
- JR Shikoku Takamatsu Station
- Takamatsu Symbol Tower
- Takamatsu Castle

== Passenger statistics ==
Ridership per day
Year	Ridership
2011	10,434
2012	10,527
2013	10,899
2014	10,824
2015	11,297
2016	11,917
2017	12,223

== See also ==
- List of railway stations in Japan
