= Hara =

Hara may refer to:

== Art and entertainment ==
- The Hara, English rock band from Manchester
- Hara (film), a 2014 Indian Kannada-language drama film
- Hara (sculpture), a 1989 artwork by Deborah Butterfield

== Mythology ==
- Hara (Hinduism), an early name for Shiva
- Harā Bərəzaitī, a legendary mountain in Persian mythology
- Hara Huna Kingdom, an ancient Chinese tribe close to Himalayas mentioned in the epic Mahabharata

== Places ==
- Hara (Bible), a Biblical place name
- Hara Arena, a 5,500-seat multi-purpose arena in Trotwood, Ohio, United States
- Hara Bay, the mouth of the Valgejõgi River in the Gulf of Finland
- Hara Castle (原城, Hara jō), a castle in Hizen Province, Japan
- Hara, Ethiopia, a town in central Ethiopia
- Hara forests, a forest in southern Iran
- Hara Island, an island in the Hara Bay off the northern coast of Estonia
- Hara, Harju County, a village in Kuuslalu Parish, Harju County, Estonia
- Hara, Lääne County, a village in Lääne-Nigula Parish, Lääne County, Estonia
- Hara, Nagano, a village in Suwa District, Nagano, Japan
- Hara (Tunis), the Jewish quarter of the Medina of Tunis
- Hara Seghira Synagogue (Arabic: معبد حارة صغيرة), a synagogue on the island of Djerba, Tunisia
- Hara Station (disambiguation), various places
- Hara University (Pashto: حرا پوهنتون), a university located in the eastern province of Khost, Afghanistan
- Bizen-Hara Station (備前原駅, Bizen-Hara-eki), a train station in Okayama, Okayama Prefecture, Japan
- Herat, an ancient city in South Western Afghanistan
- Haryana also Harayana, a state in northern India, from Hara (Vishnu) + Ayana (abode)

== Other uses ==
- 4640 Hara, a main-belt asteroid
- Hara, the botanical author abbreviation of Japanese mycologist Kanesuke Hara
- Hara (fish), a fish genus in the order Siluriformes
- Hara (given name)
- Hara (surname)
- Hara (tanden) (腹), a Japanese technical term used in medicine and martial arts referring to a specific place on or the whole of the lower abdomen
- Avicennia marina, a species of mangrove known as the hara tree in southern Iran
- Hawai'i Academy of Recording Arts
- Hazard Analysis and Risk Assessment, a methodology for determining the Automotive Safety Integrity Level as part of the quality procedure for making automotive components, defined in the ISO 26262 standard
- Hyperbolic absolute risk aversion, a term in economics

== See also ==
- Har (disambiguation)
- Hari (disambiguation)
- Haras (disambiguation)
- O'Hara (disambiguation), an Irish surname
- Haraa (film), an Indian Tamil-language action film
