= Harit =

Harit may refer to:

- Harit (name)
- Harit Pradesh, a proposed new state of India
- Harit kranti, name for the Green Revolution in India
- Batn el-Harit, a town in Egypt
- Batn el-Harit, archaeological site in Egypt on the location of ancient Theadelphia

== See also ==
- Harith, a male given name
- Harita (disambiguation)
- Hariti, a Buddhist goddess
