= Harita =

Harita may refer to:

- Relating to Hari, the Hindu god Vishnu
- the author of Harita Samhita, a Hindu scripture
- Harita Maharaja, a legendary ancient Indian king
- Harita (moth)
- Harita Group, Indonesian business conglomerate
- Haritha (Organisation), student wing of the Indian Union Muslim League
- Haritha G. Nair, Indian actress
- Harita Kaur Deol, Indian pilot

== See also ==
- Hari (disambiguation)
- Harith, a male given name
- Harit (disambiguation)
- Hariti, a Buddhist goddess
