= Papyrus 37 =

Papyrus 𝔓^{37}
- New Testament manuscript
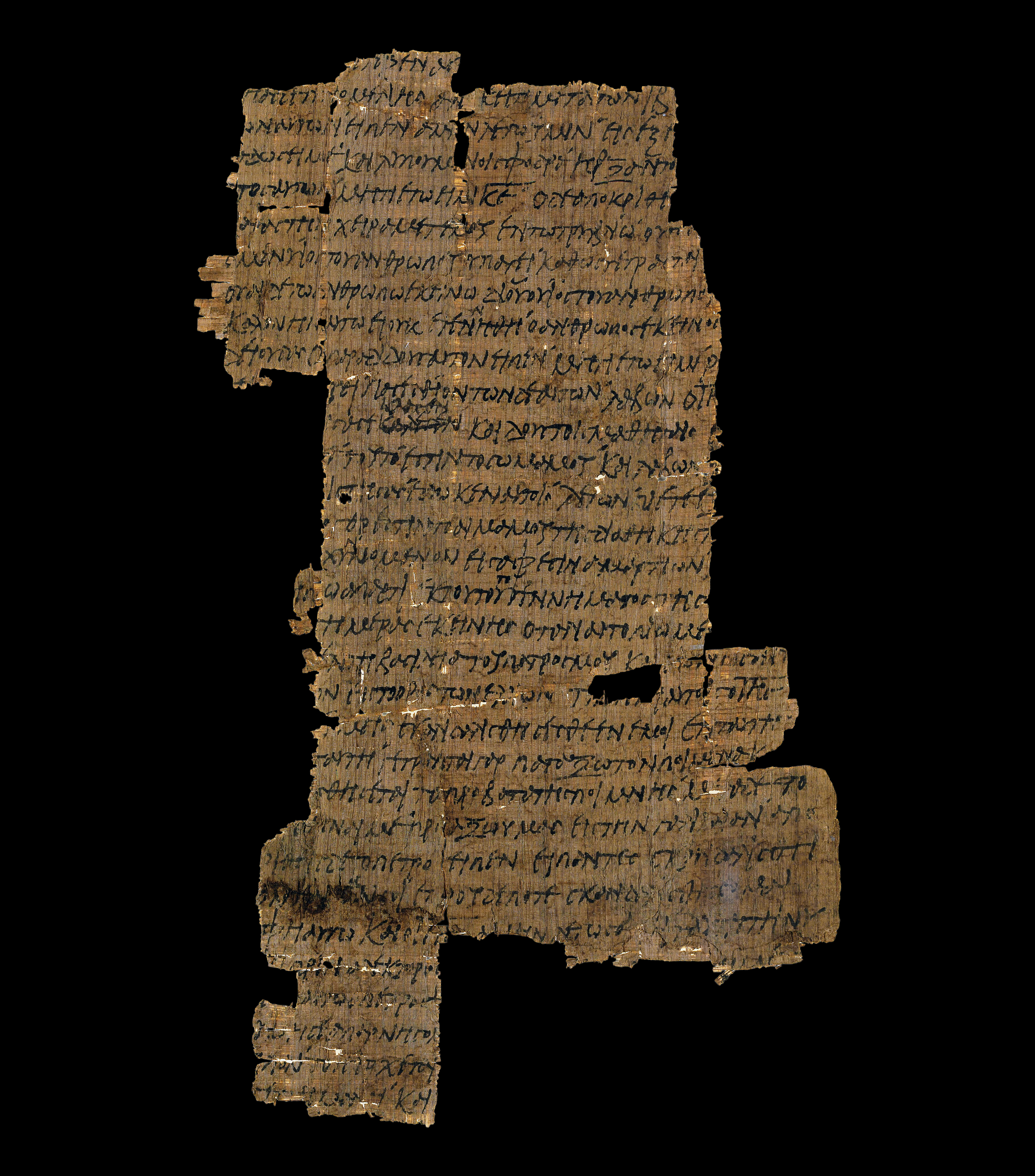
- recto Matt 26:19-37
- Text: Matthew 26:19-52
- Date: ~ 260 CE; 3rd/4th century
- Found: Unknown, bought in Cairo in 1924
- Now at: University of Michigan
- Cite: H. A. Sanders, An Early Papyrus Fragment of the Gospel of Matthew in the Michigan Collection, HTR. vol. 19. 1926, pp. 215-226.
- Size: 1 leaf; 12 x 22 cm; 33 lines/page
- Type: Free, mostly Western, Egyptian
- Category: I
- Hand: documentary

Papyrus 37 designated by 𝔓^{37} (in the Gregory-Aland numbering) is an early copy of a small part of the New Testament in Greek. It is a papyrus manuscript of the Gospel of Matthew dated to the 3rd century, about 250–260 CE, because of its affinities with 𝔓^{53} (dated to 260 CE), The correspondence of Heroninos (dated shortly before or after 260 CE) and a letter by Kopres (P. Greco-Egizi 208, dated 256 CE).

== Description ==
It is housed at the University of Michigan, Ann Arbor Library (inventory #1570), and was purchased in Cairo, Egypt, in 1924. Its origin is unknown, but it probably came from Egypt. The manuscript is a fragment of a single leaf, consisting of one column of 33 lines (40 to 50 characters per line), about 12.1 cm by 22.4 cm. The fragment is damaged on all sides, with considerable lacunae, and probably was originally 15 cm by 25.5 cm. The surviving text is of Matthew 26:19–52, which describes the Last Supper, the betrayal by Judas, and the beginning of the Arrest of Jesus.

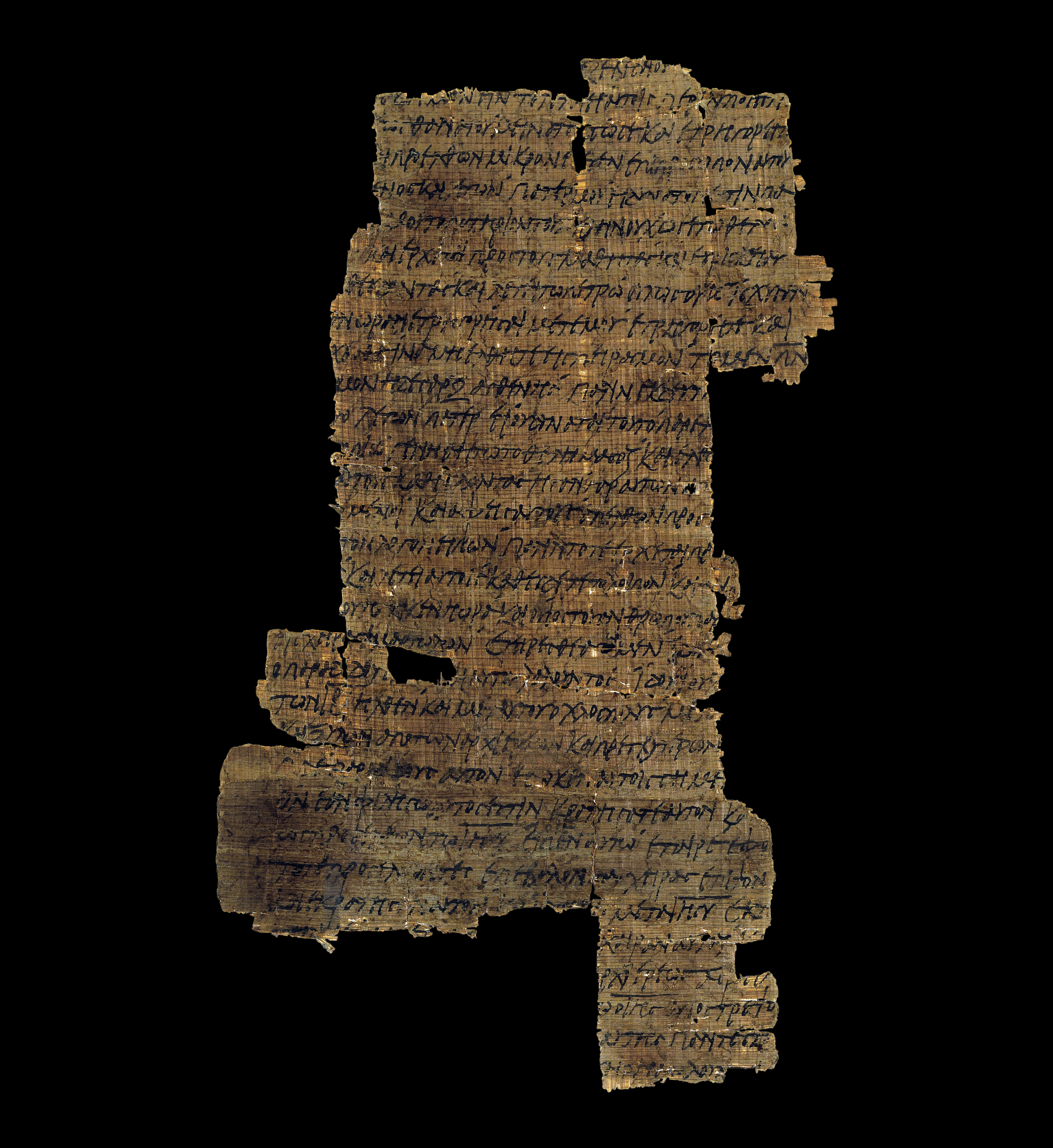
Matthew 26:38-52 on verso side

The papyrus uses a legible, cursive-like script with irregular character linking. The cursive letters resemble the cursive that was common between the years 200 and 350. There are many variations in the letters, which makes a precise dating based on paleography difficult. The writer was most likely literate and educated because the letters do not appear crude or imitative, but the irregularities suggest the writer was not an experienced scribe. The handwriting is similar to personal letters and documents from the mid 3rd century.

Certain nomina sacra (Κ̅Ε̅ Ι̅Η̅Σ̅ Π̅Ν̅Α̅ Ι̅Η̅Σ̅Υ̅) are employed in the text. There are no punctuation or accent marks. There are, however, dots that appear in irregular intervals, placed in the text by a later hand, apparently to help reading. This suggests that the manuscript was used at one point in church. Because the manuscript is so short, it is difficult to gauge the regularity of the dots, or their purpose for certain.

The text-type mostly follows Western readings. By Sander's count, there are 85 extant variants in this portion of Matthew. 18 of those readings are supported by nearly all manuscripts. 11 are unique to the manuscript. The remaining 56 fall within Western, Alexandrian, and Caesarean text-types. The text has to be reconstructed in places of lacuna by comparing the amount of space missing to the number of letters in various readings. Based on the reading variations, the text most likely originated in Egypt.

Aland placed this manuscript in Category I.

== See also ==
- List of New Testament papyri
- Matthew 26
