= P37 =

P37 or P-37 may refer to:

- Curtiss YP-37, an American prototype fighter aircraft
- HMS Unbending (P37), a submarine of the Royal Navy sold for scrap in 1949
- HMS Upholder (P37), a submarine of the Royal Navy lost in 1942
- Papyrus 37, a biblical manuscript
- Phosphorus-37, an isotope of phosphorus
- PZL.37 Łoś, a Polish medium bomber
