= Harith =

Male given name

- Gender: Male

Origin
- Meaning: Cultivator, Collector, Plowman

Other names
- Variant form: Haris

Harith or Hareth (Arabic: حارث, romanized: ḥāriṯ; [ħaː.riθ]) is a common Arabic masculine given name that means “good provider.” It also has the meanings “plowman” or “cultivator”, and “collector” and stems from the Arabic root ح־ر־ث ḥ-r-ṯ.

== Given name ==
- Al-Harith ibn Hilliza al-Yashkuri, 5th century pre-Islamic Arabian poet
- Al-Harith ibn Jabalah, (c. 528-569), Ghassanid king
- Azazil, also known as Ḥārith, the name of Iblis before he was expelled from heaven
- Aretas I, (c. 168), the Greek form of his Arabic name, Harith
- Arethas of Najran, 6th century Arab Christian martyr, also known as Harith ibn Ka'ab, founder of the Banu Harith tribe
- Harith ibn Abi Shamir, 7th century Arab Christian governor of Damascus
- Harith al-Dhari (1941–2015), an Iraqi Sunni Arab cleric
- Harith Gassani, Arab Christian governor of Sham and contemporary of Muhammad
- Harith al-Hamdani, a contemporary of Muhammad
- Harith ibn Harb, brother of the man who would be Muhammad's arch enemy, Abu Sufyan ibn Harb
- Harith Iskander (born 1966), a Malaysian actor and comedian
- Harith Lim (born 1970), a professional Singaporean darts player
- Harith Maduwantha (born 1994), a Sri Lankan cricketer
- Harith al-Muhasibi (781–857), founder of the Baghdad School of Islamic philosophy
- Harith bin Ghazi al-Nadhari (died 2015), an official of Al Qaeda in the Arabian Peninsula
- Hareth Al Naif (born 1993), a Syrian footballer
- Harith al-Obeidi (died 2009), an Iraqi politician
- Harith ibn Rab'i, one of the companions of Muhammad
- Harith al-Sudani (died 2017), Iraqi militaryman, spy and war hero
- Hareth Shanshal Sunaid, an Iraqi politician

== In fiction ==
- Harith, a male cat humanoid character in Mobile Legends.

== See also ==
- Arethas (disambiguation), the Greek form of the Arabic name Harith
- Aretas (disambiguation), another spelling of the Greek form
- Banu al-Harith, an Arabian tribe
- The Curse on Hareth, a 1982 role-playing game
- Haris, Salfit, a Palestinian town formerly known as Harith
