= Harris (given name) =

Notable people with given name Harris include:

- Harris Allan (born 1985), Canadian actor and recording artist
- Harris Andrews (born 1996), Australian footballer with the Brisbane Lions
- Harris Armstrong (1899–1973), American modernist architect
- Harris Barron (1926–2017), American artist
- Harris Barton (born 1964), American football player
- Harris Harding Bligh (1842–1918), Canadian lawyer and librarian
- Harris Blake (1929–2014), American politician
- Harris Boyle (1953–1975), Irish soldier
- Harris Dickinson (born 1996), English actor
- Harris Downey (1907–1979), American writer
- Harris Faulkner (born 1965), American newscaster and television host
- Harris Hines (1943–2018), American judge
- Harris A. Houghton (1874–1946), American physician and military intelligence officer
- Harris Hull (1909–1993), American USAF general
- Harris Jayaraj (born 1975), Indian film score composer
- Harris Johns, German record producer
- Harris Leuke Ratwatte (1900–1964), Sri Lankan Sinhala legislator and Dissawa
- Harris Mowbray (born 1999), Braille-related linguist
- Harris Ongchuan, Filipino politician
- Harris Weinstock (1854–1922), American businessman
- Harris Wittels (1984–2015), American comedian and actor
- Harris Wofford (1926–2019), American attorney and politician
- Harris (rapper) (born 1976), German rapper

== Fictional characters ==
- Harris (Porridge), a character from the UK sitcom Porridge
- Harris Brecken, a major character that appears in Dying Light

== See also ==
- Haris (given name)
