= Hari (disambiguation) =

Hari is a color adjective with strong religious symbolism in Hindu religion.

Hari may also refer to:

== Religion ==
- A name of Vishnu
- A generic name of God in Hindu monotheism

A word for "day" in various languages in the Indian cultural sphere, and as such part of the name of a number of festivals

- Hari Raya Idul Fiotri, name of Eid al-Fitr in Southeast Asian Islam
- Hari Raya Haji, name of Eid al-Adha in Southeast Asian Islam

== Given name ==
- Hari (director), Indian film director
- Hari Kondabolu (born 1982), Indian American comedian
- Hari Nef (born 1992), American actress, model, and writer
- Hari Sreenivasan (born 1974), Indian-American journalist

== Surname ==
- Badr Hari (born 1984), Dutch-Moroccan professional heavyweight kickboxer and martial artist
- Erwin Hari (1933–2024), Swiss cross-country skier
- Fritz Hari (1928–2024), Swiss politician
- Johann Hari (born 1979), British journalist
- Mata Hari (1876–1917), born Margaretha Geertruida Zelle, Dutch World War I spy
- Vani Hari (born 1979), American author and activist known for her criticism of the food industry

== Stage name ==
- Hari (singer) (born 1990), stage name of Jeong Sung-kyung, a South Korean singer
- Hajrudin "Hari" Varešanović, vocal soloist, composer, and leader of the musical group Hari Mata Hari
- Hari (actor), Indian Malayalam film actor and dubbing artist

== Toponymy ==
- Hari, the Hungarian name for Heria village, Fărău Commune, Alba County, Romania
- Hari, Iran, a village in Sistan and Baluchestan Province, Iran
- Hari River, Afghanistan, Afghanistan, Iran and Turkmenistan
- Haryana also Hariyana, a state in northern India, from Hari (Vishnu) and Ayana (abode)

== Fictional works ==
- Hari Seldon, the fictional founder of psychohistory
- Hari, character in the Japanese animated series Inuyasha
- Hari Koo, protagonist in the animated series The Haunted House
- Hari, a 1982 Filipino stop motion animated short film by the Alcazaren brothers
- Hari (film), a 2018 Nepalese film

== See also ==
- Hara (disambiguation)
- Har (disambiguation)
- Harita (disambiguation)
