= Hara Station =

Hara Station is a name for several train stations in Japan

- Hara Station (Shizuoka) in Shizuoka prefecture
- Hara Station (Aichi) in Aichi prefecture
- Hara Station (Kagawa) in Kagawa prefecture
