= Aretas I =

First known King of the Nabataeans

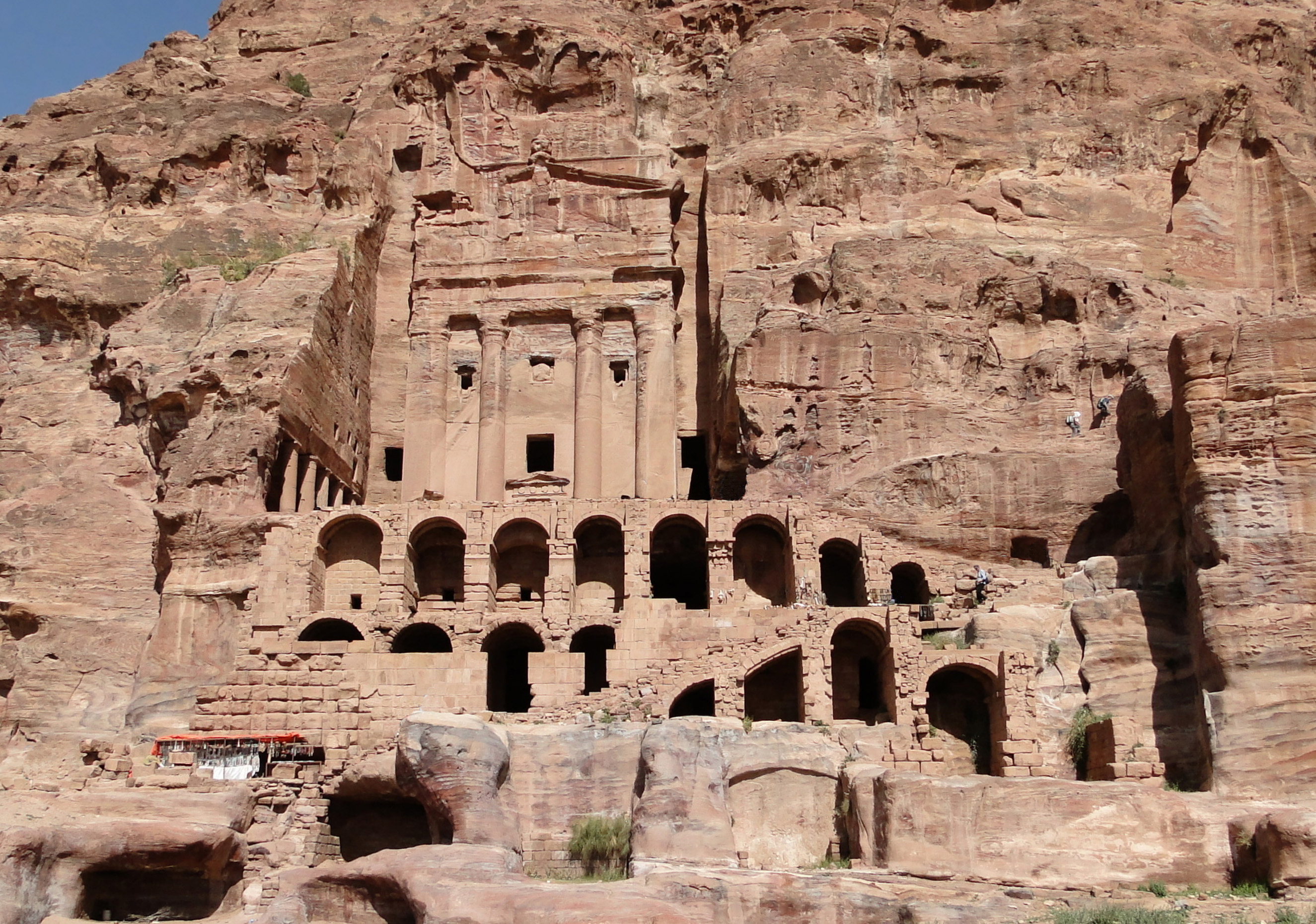
The Urn Tomb, Petra, Jordan

Aretas I (/ˈærɪtəs/; Nabataean Aramaic: 𐢊𐢛𐢞𐢞, romanized: *Ḥārītaṯ; Ancient Greek: Αρέτας, romanized: Arétās) was the first known King of the Nabataeans. His name appeared on the oldest Nabataean inscription dating from 168 BC which was found at Halutza. He is also mentioned in the deuterocanonical book 2 Maccabees (5:8). This book presents how Jason, the High Priest of Israel who founded a Greek quarter in Jerusalem, was ordered to be held prisoner by Aretas I after being forced to leave Jerusalem because of the "shame of his conspiracy", 2 Maccabees (5:7). He ended in Egypt, after he wrote to the Spartans. The king's name as transcribed in Arabic is الحارث, Al-Ḥāriṯ, or الحارثة, Al-Ḥāriṯa, stemming from Harith which means "the collector, provider; Plowman; Cultivator".

== See also ==
- Aretas (disambiguation page)
- List of Nabataean kings (Rulers of Nabataea who reigned over the Nabataean Kingdom, inhabited by the Nabataeans, located in present-day Jordan)
- Nabataean Aramaic (Western dialect of Aramaic used by the Nabataeans)
- Nabataean Kingdom (Ancient Arab kingdom (3rd century BC – 106 AD)
- Nabataean script (script used by the Nabataeans from the second century BC onwards)
- Petra (ancient rock-cut historical city and archaeological site in southern Jordan)
- The Ancient Greek form of the name Aretas (Ἀρέτας) on Wiktionary
- The Latin form of the name Aretas on Wiktionary

== Sources ==
- Jewish Virtual Library
