= Fusazaki Station =

Railway station in Takamatsu, Kagawa Prefecture, Japan

Fusazaki Station 房前駅
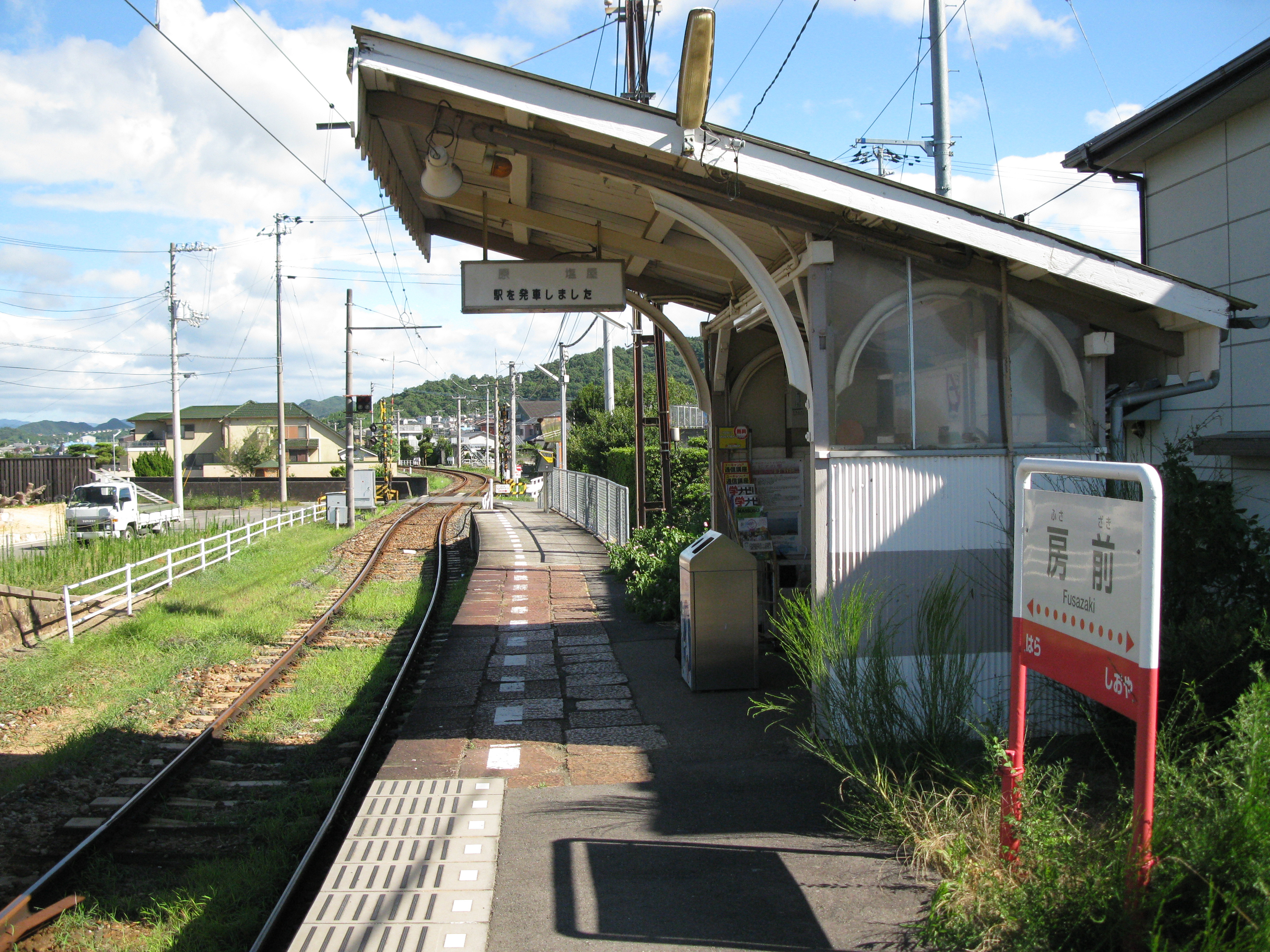
- Fusazaki Station platform

General information
- Location: 622-1 Idehigashi Murechohara, Takamatsu-shi, Kagawa-ken 761-0123; Japan
- Coordinates: 34.3325°N 134.1585°E
- Operator: Takamatsu-Kotohira Electric Railroad
- Line: ■ Shido Line
- Distance: 10.6 km from Kawaramachi
- Platforms: 1 side platform

Construction
- Structure type: At-grade
- Parking: No
- Cycle facilities: Yes
- Accessible: Yes

Other information
- Status: Unstaffed
- Station code: S13

History
- Opened: November 18, 1911

Passengers
- FY2017: 92 per day
Location
- Location within Kagawa Prefecture Location within Japan

Fusazaki Station (房前駅, Fusazaki-eki) is a passenger railway station located in the city of Takamatsu, Kagawa, Japan. It is operated by the private transportation company Takamatsu-Kotohira Electric Railroad (Kotoden) and is designated station "S13".

== Lines ==
Fusazaki Station is a station of the Kotoden Shido Line and is located 10.6 km from the terminus of the line at Kawaramachi Station.

== Layout ==
The station consists of one side platform serving a single bi-directional track. It is in the middle of a sharp curve, and the platform also turns sharply to the left toward Kotoden Shido. It used to be a structure with two opposite platforms on two sides, and the remains of the platform remain on the north side. The station is unattended.

== Adjacent stations ==
«	Service	»
Kotoden Shido Line
Shioya	Local	Hara

== History ==
Fusazaki Station opened on November 18, 1911 on the Tosan Electric Tramway. It became a station of the Sanuki Electric Railway in 1942. On November 1, 1943 it became a station on the Takamatsu-Kotohira Electric Railway. Operations were suspended on January 26, 1945 from Yakuri Station to this station, but were reopened on October 9, 1949.

== Passenger statistics ==
Ridership per day
Year	Ridership
2011	89
2012	83
2013	83
2014	83
2015	68
2016	85
2017	92

== Surrounding area ==
- Japan National Route 11

== See also ==
- List of railway stations in Japan
