= Kharabet Ihrit =

Archaeological site in Egypt

- Theadelphia
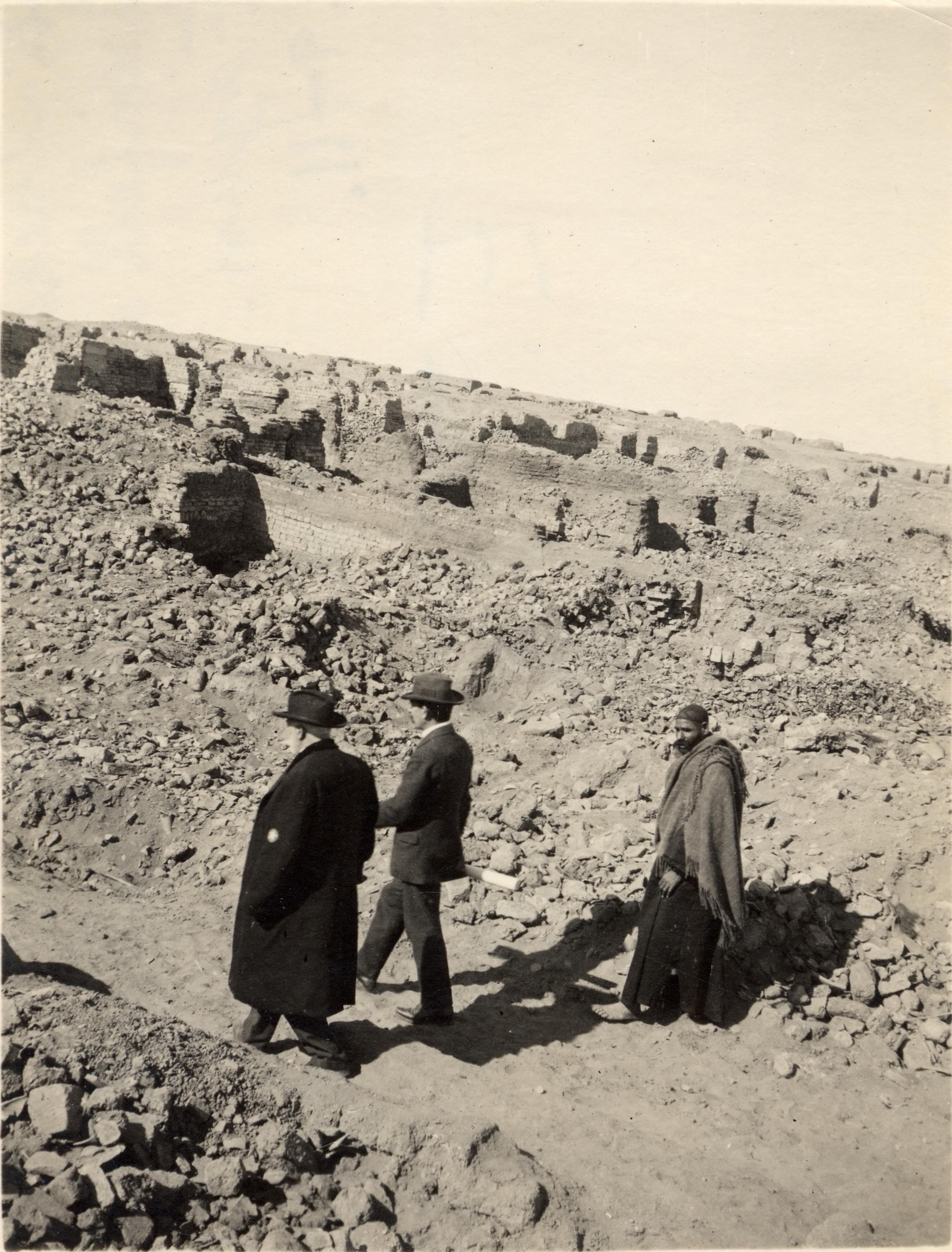
- Francis Kelsey and Bernard Grenfell at Theadelphia in 1920

- Location of the site
- 29°20′52.33″N 30°33′50.83″E
- Cultures: Greek, Roman, Egyptian
- Location: Faiyum Governorate, Egypt

Site notes
- Archaeologists: Bernard Grenfell; Arthur Hunt; Otto Rubensohn; Gustave Lefebvre; Evaristo Breccia; Francis Kelsey

Kharabet Ihrit, also known as Batn Ihrit, Batn el Harit (or simply Harit), often confused with the village of Batn-Ihrît approximately 3 km to the North-West, is an archaeological site in Egypt's Faiyum Governorate on the site of the ancient settlement of Theadelphia.

A number of archaeological expeditions have explored the site since the start of the twentieth century, at this time a number of mud brick houses were still left partially standing, however in the present day very little of those structures remains. The site consists of two parts: the main site that was the location where the ancient village once stood and an ancient cemetery to the West containing a variety of Roman, Ptolemaic tombs.

Claudia Antonia, daughter of Claudius, has a property in this village with tenants.

The settlement was abandoned some time in the 4th Century AD.

== Excavations ==
The site has been the subject of a number of archaeological excavations:

In 1898-99 an excavation led by Bernard Grenfell and Arthur Hunt was carried out, sponsored by the Graeco-Roman branch and recovered a large number of papyrii as well as other artifacts, with findings ranging from the early Ptolemaic period (c. 280 BC) to the late Roman period (c. 300 AD). Among the findings was the Heroninos Archive, a cache of documents from the 3rd century AD, which is one of the largest coherent groups of documents from the Roman Empire. One of the artifacts discovered during this excavation was a scutum or shield. This was reported about in 1940 as the Kasr el Harit shield. This appears to have been a mistake in reporting the location likely resulting from an amalgamation of the name of this side (Batn el Harit) and the nearby site of Qasr el Banat, as a result, this site of often erroneously referred to a Kasr el-Harit in the literature.

Egyptologist Otto Rubensohn excavated the site in 1902 while working on behalf of the Royal Museums of Berlin and the Papyruskommission. Of particular note was the discovery of painted wall niches in the Roman houses.

An excavation was carried out by Evaristo Breccia in 1912-13 which discovered the temple of Pnepheros.
