= Papyrus sanitary pad =

A papyrus sanitary pad, or Makapad, is a sanitary napkin made from papyrus, a natural material. It is reported to be 75 percent cheaper than a conventional menstrual pad and thus an advantage to the poor, as well as being highly absorbent. It is Africa's first hand-made menstrual hygiene product that is made completely with materials available locally, with its biggest production plant being in Kawempe. Makapad is an acronym used for menstruation, administration, knowledge, and affordability.

== Background Information ==
The papyrus sanitary pad aims primarily to help make sanitary pads an affordable and accessible necessity for young girls in developing countries. They help tackle the problem of girls' absenteeism in school owing to menstruation and associated behaviours for which they do not have adequate facilities (for example: lack of privacy for cleaning, poor availability of pads, lack of education about menstrual hygiene, lack of separate toilet facilities, and lack of access to water). Many women in the west of Uganda have to employ poor substitutes for sanitary pads, considering they are twice the cost of their average incomes ($1,25 a day). While only a handful few can afford this luxury, most others make use of cloth rags, banana leaves, or waste paper. Along with being ineffective options, they can also affect the women's menstrual hygiene negatively. They pose a risk to their health and contribute to their increasing absenteeism. In light of this situation, Makapads, being absorbent pads with up to 8 to 10 hours of usage, are not only better alternatives among other available menstrual products, but also help balance out the negative effect on the environment that conventional sanitary pads have.

== Production ==
The pads, developed by Dr. Moses Kizza Musaazi at Uganda's Makerere University Department of Technology, are targeted especially at rural primary school girls who have started menstruating. These girls would normally find it difficult to attend school if they had no pads, and often cannot afford conventional pads. These sanitary pads also provide employment opportunities for the women of the rural communities in Uganda. They are made entirely by hand, using local materials.

This was part of the UN Refugee Agency (UNHCR) program to provide locally made Makapads to women and girls throughout refugee camps in Uganda.

The pads are made out of dry papyrus and mixed with waste paper and then stitched with non-woven absorbent pieces of cloth. The papyrus fibres, once dried and pulverised, are mixed with paper and water to make a thick paste. The paste is then sun-dried, smoothed and cut to size into absorbent inserts. This is the only part of production which is performed mechanically with the help of machines. The rest of it mostly produced manually and is thus a form of employment for many. The pads are then exposed to ultra violet light to eliminate any germs or bacteria. Finally, they are combined into packs of three and are ready to be put up for sale. They are made almost entirely from natural materials, the rest being non-woven material and polythene paper. The main materials used in producing these pads are papyrus and waste paper. The energy consumed in their production is direct sunlight (350 W), through solar panels, making it a very environment-friendly and sustainable option. These pads are almost 100 per cent biodegradable, are chemical-free, and also affordable since their target audience are young girls in developing countries, mainly Sierra Leone and Uganda.

There are a few limitations in the production and distribution of Makapads. Presently, Makapads are not very popular in the commercial market, and are heavily dependent on the UNHCR for funding. Additionally, they can be produced only in very specific kind of environments which provide adequate water supply and suitable soil for growing papyrus. This makes their production a little less reliable than alternatives available
