= Har =

Har or HAR may refer to:

== People ==
- Har Bilas Sarda (1867–1955), Indian academic, judge and politician
- Har Sharma (1922–1992), Indian cricket umpire

== Mythology ==
- Hár and Hárr, among the many names of Odin in Norse mythology
- Horus, an Egyptian god
- Shiva, a Hindu god

== Other uses ==
- Capital City Airport (Pennsylvania), IATA code
- Har (Blake), a character in the mythological writings of William Blake
- Hár (crater), a crater on Jupiter's moon Callisto
- Har (Korean surname)
- HAR (file format), the HTTP Archive format
- Harari language, spoken in Ethiopia, ISO 639-3 code
- Harrisburg Transportation Center, Amtrak station code
- Highway advisory radio
- Human accelerated regions, the name of some human genes
- Harjamukti LRT station, a light rail station in Jakarta, Indonesia
- MC-Hár, a Faroese rap rock group
- Har, a component of Hebrew placenames literally meaning "mountain"
- Haryana, a state in northern India

== See also ==
- Hara (disambiguation)
- Hari (disambiguation)
