= Heroninos Archive =

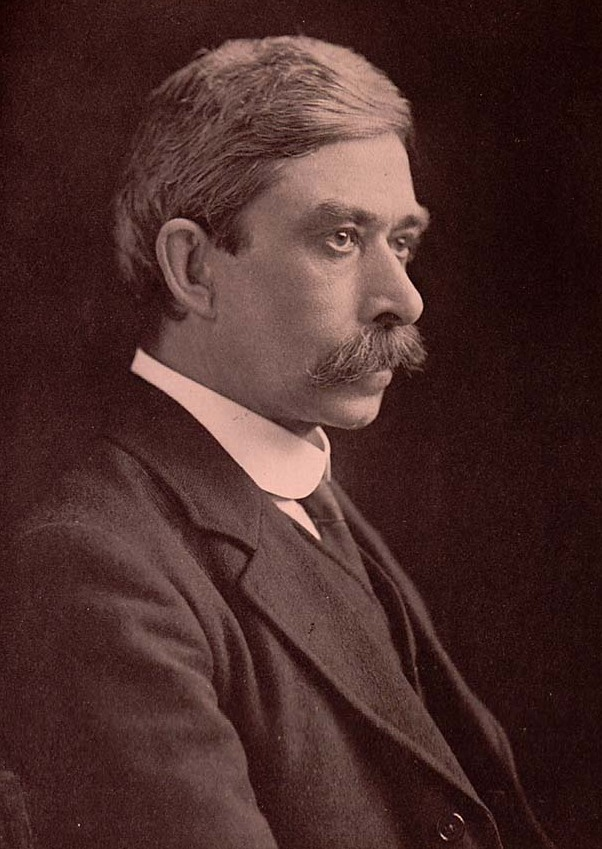
Bernard Grenfell

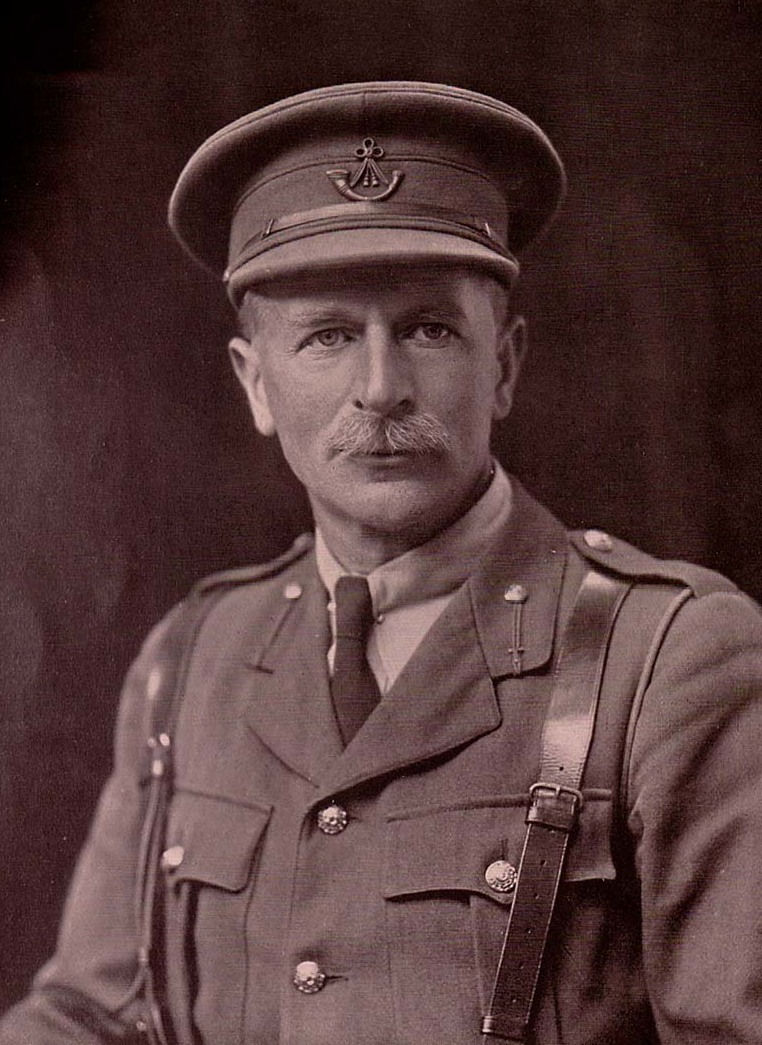
Arthur Hunt

The Heroninos Archive is a collection of around a thousand papyrus documents, dating to the third century AD. They were found at the very end of the 19th century at Batn Ihrit (the site of ancient Theadelphia), in the Faiyum area of Egypt by Bernard Pyne Grenfell and Arthur Surridge Hunt. The archive is named after Heroninos, the phrontistes (Koine Greek: manager) of the estate whose records make up a large part of the collection.

As well as being the largest single collection of papyri from Roman Egypt, it is also significant for the in-depth picture it gives of the running of a Roman estate. To date, less than half of the documents in the archive have been published. Scholars believe that when it is all published, it will represent "one of the largest coherent groups of documents from the Roman Empire."

== Origin of the archive ==
The archive contains around a thousand papyrus documents. The bulk of the documents are records relating to the management of an estate belonging to Aurelius Appianus. For the period from late-249 to mid-268, the manager of the estate was a man named Heroninos. Most of the letters in the archive are addressed to Heroninos, and come from the managers of other estates in the Arsinoites nome (the area of modern Faiyum), or from the central administration of the estate, which was based in the nome capital of Arsinoe. They were led by a head official called Alypios.

In many cases, the papyrus is significantly older than the document written on it. Reuse of writing materials was a common practice on the Appianus estate, and many of the Heroninos documents feature fragments of earlier texts on the recto, primarily to do with the business of the town council of Arsinoe. One of these documents has been dated to 144 using prosopographical techniques.

The documents are not considered to have come from a filing system. Evidence in the archive shows that another employee of the estate, an epiktenites named Hermias, collated documents by pasting them end to end to form a single length which could be rolled up (a tomos sunkollesimos); while another letter to a farm manager suggests that this man was in the habit of throwing letters in a cupboard and forgetting about them. Nothing suggests that Heroninos pasted his letters together. While the recovered documents pertain to consecutive months in any regnal year, they do not feature paperwork for any entire year.

== Discovery ==
According to a widely told story, the archive was discovered at the end of the 1898/99 digging season at Harit, when workmen in the employ of Grenfell and Hunt decided to carry on digging, and came upon a box full of papers. Several scholars have cast doubt upon this story – P.Fay.133 had been found independently before the discovery of the archive, and BGU 1030 and SB 5807 were uncovered in ruined houses by another team of archaeologists. The publication in 1998 of another letter, which had been included in the material excavated by Grenfell and Hunt in the 1898/99 season, but not included by them in the Heroninos archive, casts further doubt. However Mariarosaria Salvo, who translated and published the letter, still considers it possible that the bulk of the archive was in a box at some time.

The archive was broken up in the early 20th century, and sold to dealers. Over twenty major papyrological collections hold parts of the archive, although significant portions went to the Laurentian Library in Florence, the University Library of Prague, and the National Library of Austria. It was with the publication of the majority of the Florentine papers that the archive emerged as an entity of interest to scholars, and the name Heroninos Archive was given to the collection at this time.

== Content of the archive ==
The archive contains a number of identified groups of texts. Around 350 are in the nature of internal memos – correspondence to (or more rarely from) Heroninus, concerning the management of the estate. Fifty texts or fragments are accounts prepared by Heroninus, or his son Heronas who succeeded him. There are another group of accounts prepared by Eirenaios, who was the manager of another part of the Appianus estate, at Euhemeria. Another fifty relate to other employees of the Appianus estate, and forty documents appear to be fiscal receipts from external authorities.

The Heroninos Archive is of considerable interest to scholars, as it contains a concentration of evidence relating to the running of the Theadelphia unit of the Appianus estate (and to a lesser extent the Euhemeria unit), giving an in-depth insight into how such estates were run. In a wider perspective, the archive also features much information about the economy of Egypt under the Romans, and the functioning of a third century society.

== Accounting in the Heroninos archive ==
The Appianus estate had a complex and standardised system of accounting, which was followed by all its local farm managers, whose activities were coordinated to exploit economies of scale.

Each administrator on each sub-division of the estate drew up his own little accounts: for day-to-day running of the estate; payment of the workforce; production of crops; the sale of produce; the use of animals; and general expenditure on the staff. This information was then summarised on pieces of papyrus scroll into one big yearly account for each particular sub-division of the estate. Entries were arranged by sector, with cash expenses and gains extrapolated from all the different sectors. Accounts of this kind gave the owner the opportunity to take better economic decisions as the information was purposefully selected and arranged.
