= Qasr el Banat, Faiyum Governorate =

Archaeological site in Egypt

Qasr el Banat
- Euhemeria
- Location of the site
- 29°22′23″N 30°32′38″E
- Cultures: Greek, Roman, Egyptian
- Location: Faiyum Governorate, Egypt

History
- Built: c. 3rd century BC
- Abandoned: c. 4th century AD

Site notes
- Archaeologists: Bernard Grenfell; Arthur Hunt; David Hogarth

Qasr el Banat (Arabic: قصور البَنَات) is an archaeological site located between the archaeological sites of Theadelphia and Philoteris in Faiyum Governorate in Egypt, about 5 km south of Lake Qarun. It is the site of the ancient village of Euhemeria. All that remains of the site today is the two tholos baths, the remains of an ancient wall, fragments of several buildings and scattered bricks and pottery after large part of the land was reclaimed in the first few decades of the twentieth century as the desert retreated.

The settlement was founded during the reign of Ptolemy I or Ptolemy II and was abandoned some time in the 4th century AD.

== Excavation ==
The only documented archaeological mission to explore the site was the 1898 excavation by Bernard Grenfell and Arthur Hunt having been recommended to them by David Hogarth.

They were attracted to the location because it was already a well known source of papyri. During this excavation they found a large amount of papyri, including hundreds of documents in a house belonging to Lucius Bellenus Gemellus a wealthy Roman during the reign of Domitian and Trajan. They were also able to recover a number of demotic and Greek papyri from the local temple dedicated to Sobek and Isis. A number of other artefacts were also found, including an unusually large number of ostraca, pottery, coins and various household objects.

== Popular culture ==
A fictionalized version of Euhemeria appears in the 2017 videogame Assassin's Creed Origins.
