= Hara (given name) =

Hara is a given name. Notable people with the name include:

- Hara Chandra Ghosh (1808–1868), leader of the Young Bengal group
- Hara P. Misra (born 1940), American biochemist
- Hara Patnaik (born 1958), Indian film actor
- Goo Hara (1991–2019), Korean singer

== See also ==
- Hara (disambiguation)
