= Haris (given name) =

Male given name

- Gender: Male and female

Other gender
- Feminine: Harisa

Origin
- Meaning: Cultivator (Arabic) Grace (Greek)

Other names
- Variant form: Harith

Haris is a unisex given name, with two origins: Arabic and Greek.

In Arabic, it is a phonetic variant of the Arabic name Harith (حارث), which means "cultivator”.

In Greek, "Haris" is a Greek forename, or given name, which means "grace".

In the Balkans, "Haris" is popular among Bosniaks in the former Yugoslav nations due to the importance of Arabic in Islam, which is the prevailing religion among Bosniaks.

== Given name ==
- Haris Alagic (born 1995), Dutch singer
- Haris Alexiou (born 1950), Greek singer
- Haris Azhar (born 1975), Indonesian human rights activist
- Haris Doukas (born 1980), Greek mechanical engineer, professor, and politician
- Haris Duljević (born 1993), Bosnian footballer
- Haris Džinović (born 1951), Bosnian singer, composer, and lyricist
- Haris Khan (born 1995), Pakistani cricketer
- Haris Medunjanin (born 1985), Bosnian footballer
- Haris Pašović (born 1961), Bosnian theatre and film director
- Haris Radetinac (born 1985), Serbian professional footballer
- Haris Rauf (born 1993), Pakistani cricketer
- Haris Seferovic (born 1992), Swiss footballer
- Haris Silajdžić (born 1945), Bosnian politician and academic
- Haris Sohail (born 1989), Pakistani cricketer
- Haris Tabaković (born 1994), Bosnian footballer

== See also ==
- Harris (given name)
