= Aretas =

Aretas is the Greek form of a name borne by kings of the Nabataeans resident at Petra. It can refer to:

- Aretas I, a king in the time of Antiochus IV Epiphanes (reigned 175–164 BCE)
- Aretas II ruled Nabatea from 120 or 110 to 96 BC
- Aretas III ruled Nabatea from 87 to 62 BC
- Aretas IV Philopatris was the father-in-law of Herod Antipas; he is described as ruler of Damascus at the time of Paul's conversion
- Aretas (martyr) (died 523) Arab Christian martyr in Yemen
- Aretas William Young (1778–1835), Canadian politician

== See also ==
- Arethas (disambiguation)
- Four encyclopedia entries on Aretas in Smith, William. (1848). A Dictionary of Greek and Roman biography and mythology. London. John Murray: printed by Spottiswoode and Co., New-Street Square and Parliament Street, online version on Perseus Digital Library:
  - Perseus entry on Aretas in section A.38.aretas-bio-1
  - Perseus entry on Aretas in section A.38.aretas-bio-2
  - Perseus entry on Aretas in section A.38.aretas-bio-3
  - Perseus entry on Aretas in section A.38.aretas-bio-4
- List of Nabataean kings
- Nabataean Aramaic
