= Hara Station (Kagawa) =

Railway station in Takamatsu, Kagawa Prefecture, Japan

Hara Station 原駅
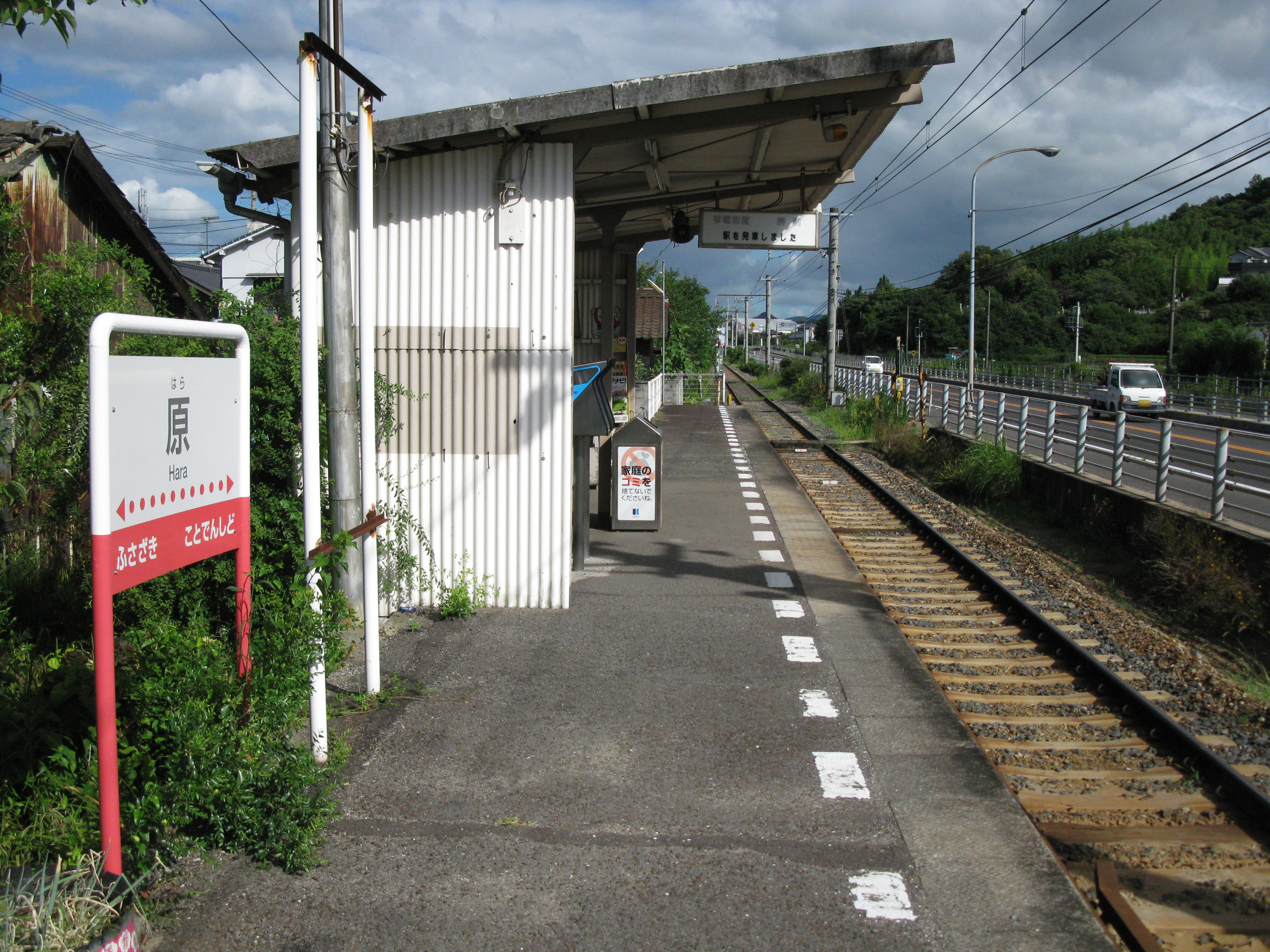
- Hara Station platform

General information
- Location: Murechohara, Takamatsu-shi, Kagawa-ken 761-0123; Japan
- Coordinates: 34.3265°N 134.1636°E
- Operator: Takamatsu-Kotohira Electric Railroad
- Line: ■ Shido Line
- Distance: 11.5 km from Kawaramachi
- Platforms: 1 side platform

Construction
- Structure type: At-grade
- Parking: No
- Cycle facilities: No
- Accessible: Yes

Other information
- Status: Unstaffed
- Station code: S14

History
- Opened: November 18, 1911

Passengers
- FY2017: 172 per day
Location
- Location within Kagawa Prefecture Location within Japan

Hara Station (原駅, Hara-eki) is a passenger railway station located in the city of Takamatsu, Kagawa, Japan. It is operated by the private transportation company Takamatsu-Kotohira Electric Railroad (Kotoden) and is designated station "S14".

== Lines ==
Hara Station is a station of the Kotoden Shido Line and is located 11.5 km from the opposing terminus of the line at Kawaramachi Station.

== Layout ==
The station consists of one side platform serving a single bi-directional track. The station entrance has a slope from the back of both ends of the platform to the central part of the platform. The station is unattended.

== Adjacent stations ==
«	Service	»
Kotoden Shido Line
Fusazaki	Local	Kotoden-Shido

== History ==
Hara Station opened on November 18, 1911, on the Tosan Electric Tramway. It became a station of the Sanuki Electric Railway in 1942. On November 1, 1943, it became a station on the Takamatsu-Kotohira Electric Railway. Operations were suspended on January 26, 1945, from Yakuri Station to this station, but were reopened on October 9, 1949.

== Passenger statistics ==
Ridership per day
Year	Ridership
2011	193
2012	198
2013	176
2014	151
2015	156
2016	175
2017	172

== Surrounding area ==
- Shido Bay
- Kagawa Prefectural University of Health Sciences
- Japan National Route 11

== See also ==
- List of railway stations in Japan
