= Francis Kelsey =

American classicist and archaeologist

Francis Willey Kelsey
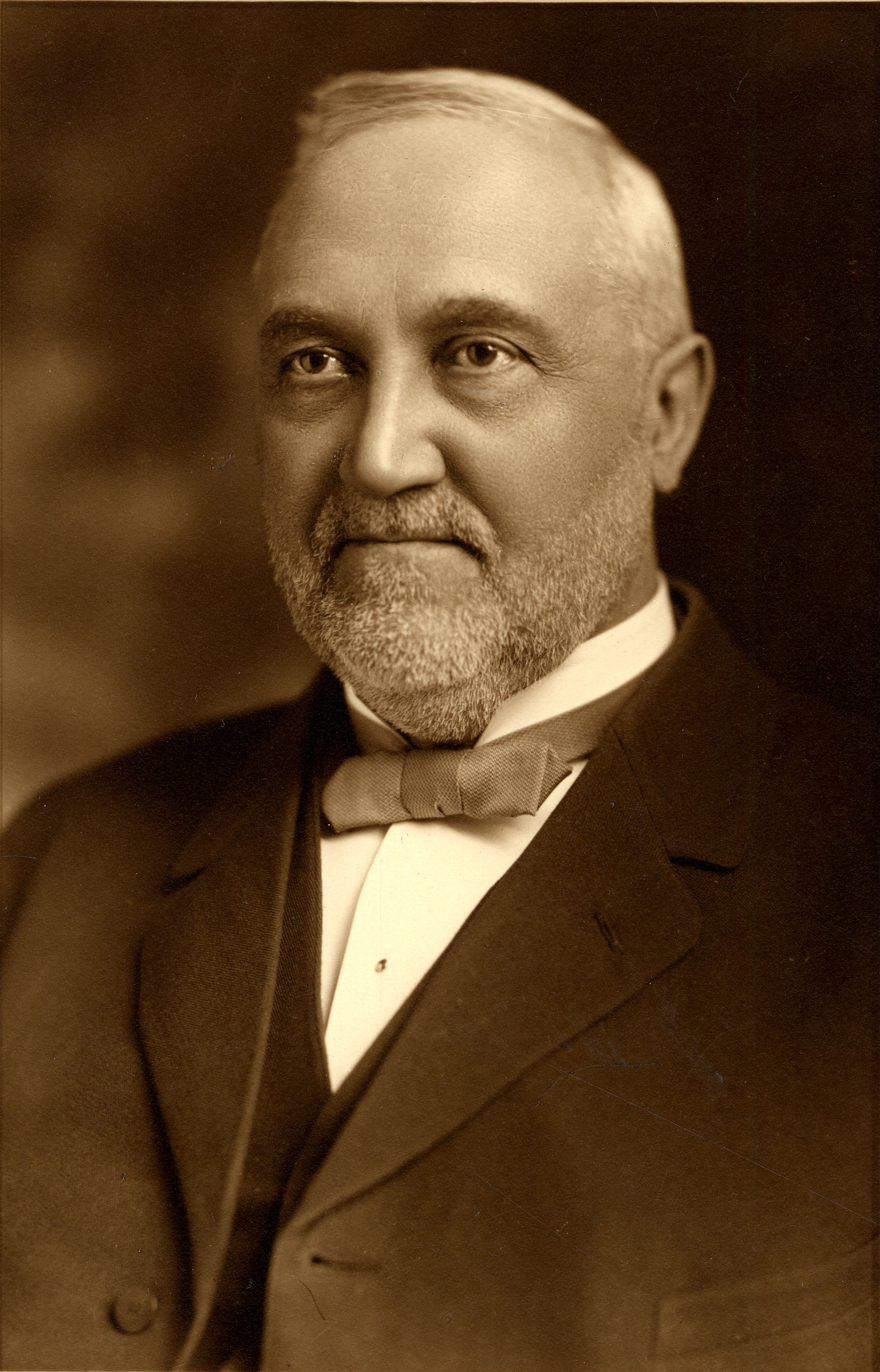
- Born: May 23, 1858; Ogden, New York, U.S.
- Died: May 14, 1927 (aged 68); Ann Arbor, Michigan, U.S.
- Education: University of Rochester
- Occupations: Academic and Archaeologist
- Years active: 1880–1927
- Organization: University of Michigan

Francis Willey Kelsey (May 23, 1858 – May 14, 1927) was an American classicist, professor, and archaeologist who led the first expedition to the Near-East by the University of Michigan, where he acquired a collection of antiquities for the university. Originally hailing from New York, he first taught at Lake Forest University, in Illinois. He was the secretary of the Archaeological Institute of America, Vice President, and President, of the American Philological Association.

== Early life ==
Francis Kelsey's life started in Ogden, New York, in Monroe County, New York on May 23, 1858. Kelsey was the fourth child of Henry Kelsey and Olive Trowbridge Kelsey and was named after his grandmother on his mother's side. Francis' father, Henry, originally wanted to go into the medical field. To pay for his medical training, he worked as a school teacher, and travelled at night to teach singing lessons. He later learned that his lack of knowledge of Greek and Latin would make his studies longer and instead bought a farm near his parents’ home in Stony Point. He married Olive Cornelia Trowbridge in 1842, sister to antislavery writer and friend of Mark Twain, John Townsend Trowbridge. The Kelseys stayed at the farm in Stony Point until Francis was two years old and then moved to a larger farm at Churchville. There was a school in town that Francis attended, but to go to secondary school he would have to travel to the Lockport Union School, about sixty miles away. He enrolled when he was 15. After attending Lockport, he went to the University of Rochester where he followed the Classical Course and won a sophomore prize in Latin and a junior prize in Greek. He graduated in 1880 being elected valedictorian.

== Career ==
=== Lake Forest University ===
After graduation, Kelsey was appointed instructor of classics at Lake Forest University, a new college in the northern suburbs of Chicago. Within his first couple of years he wrote articles for a college journal called the Lake Forest University Review, on his views of the classics and eventually become editor. While at Lake Forest University, he visited Europe to learn more about archaeology. His first visits were to Pompeii but he also visited some German Universities. He attended Leipzig University in 1884 to expand his knowledge on classical archaeology. In 1885 he was back in Southern Europe visiting Italy, Greece, and Asia Minor, discovering different ways to teach the classics. At Lake Forest, Kelsey also started his textbook writing career. One of his textbooks, Caesar's Gallic War, went through twenty one editions in his lifetime. A conflict at Lake Forest over the appropriate roles of research and teaching there led to the departure of Kelsey and other faculty members.

=== University of Michigan ===
Kelsey started at the University of Michigan in 1889 as professor of Latin. From his first semester he made sure the books his students needed were available to check out at the library. This practice was new for the time and would not become precedent until 1915. Kelsey made sure his classes were not just on the languages he was teaching but the culture and the context of the times, and set up a classical fellowship to study archaeology. When Tappan became president in 1852, he no longer made classical language a requirement and created a Bachelor of Science. This eventually led to a drop of 40% of undergraduate students, but an increase in grad students studying classics in Kelsey's time. Between 1900 and 1901, Kelsey took a year off to teach at the American School of Classical Studies in Rome.

Once Kelsey returned, his time abroad contributed to him becoming the lead American scholar on Pompeii. In 1902 he was selected to be the secretary of the Archaeological Institute of America (AIA). Throughout his tenure as secretary, he tried to pass legislation within congress about how artifacts from other countries should be handled by the United States. After a stalemate within congress, the AIA teamed up with the American Anthropological Association to eventually pass a resolution in 1905, the same year he was named Vice President of the American Philological Association. By the end of 1906 he was elected president of the American Philological Association.

==== University Musical Society presidency ====
Kelsey was also president of the University Musical Society. Kelsey was a major factor behind the construction of Hill Auditorium, one of the concert halls designed by Albert Kahn and opened in 1913. Kelsey sought out Detroit architect Albert Kahn and discussed the possibility of Hill Auditorium with him. Kelsey gave Kahn two options of where to construct the building, he eventually picked the location on North State street that thousands of students now walk past and perform in regularly. While the organ for UMS and Hill Auditorium were mostly one time fundraising projects, Kelsey was constantly fundraising to ensure his research, associations he was a part of, and the overall Classics Department. In 1904 Kelsey started his own research oriented journal called the University of Michigan's Humanistic Series that he was editor of from 1904 to 1927.

==== Expeditions to the Near-East ====
Starting in 1919, Kelsey was talking to Detroit manufacturer Standish Backish who showed interest in putting together an expedition to the Near East. Backish was talking to a professor, Caspar Rene Gregory, who, after he died in World War I, inspired him to organize an expedition for the retrieval of biblical documents. Standish considered himself too old, so he asked Kelsey to lead it. Kelsey agreed and fundraising started. This first expedition started by ship from the East Coast to Glasgow, making its way to London, then Paris and eventually towards Constantinople, Near East, and Asia Minor. The entire expedition was expected to take two years, one for exploration and the other for writing and research which would be done between London and Paris since at the time, that is where the only copies of other ancient manuscripts were located. While originally Backish suggested that the main objective be for the retrieval of biblical texts, it was also brought up that documentation of the battlefields that Julius Caesar fought on should also be researched and heavily photographed. Overall the expedition was a huge success, Kelsey returned with Isabelle and Easton to Ann Arbor in 1921 to resume teaching. He went on a second expedition in 1927 that yielded even more antiquities and papyrus, specifically from Egypt.

== Personal life ==
While at Lake Forest Kelsey met student Belle Badger who showed an interest in the classics and antiquities. After Belle got her degree (going by Isabelle for the remainder of her life), she and Kelsey were married in 1885 and had three children, Charlotte, Ruth, and Easton. Kelsey was a practicing Presbyterian. He made his religious views well known by some of his articles within the Lake Forest Review.

=== Death ===
Immediately after returning to Ann Arbor, Kelsey went to the hospital. Throughout this period of illness, he was still looking over manuscripts and doing administrative work. On May 14 he went into a coma and died shortly afterward, the cause of death being rheumatism in his chest.

=== Legacy ===
The artifacts returned from Kelsey's expeditions formed the core of the university's holdings in classical archaeology and papyrology and papyrological studies was established under Kelsey's professorship. The university's museum of archaeology was named after Kelsey in 1953.
