= Arethas =

Arethas (Ancient Greek: Ἀρέθας) is the Greek form of the Arab name al-Harith (Arabic: الحارث, romanized: al-Ḥārith). It can refer to:

- Arethas (martyr) (died 523), Arab Christian martyr in Yemen
- Al-Harith ibn Jabalah, Ghassanid king (r. 528–569)
- Arethas of Caesarea (fl. 10th-century), Byzantine scholar and archbishop of Caesarea (modern Kayseri, Turkey)

== See also ==
- Aretas (disambiguation)
