= Harris Barron =

American artist

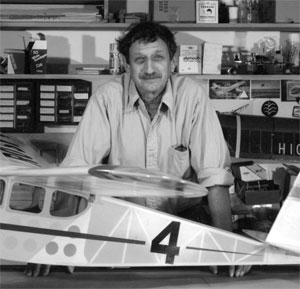
- Born: 1926
- Died: October 22, 2017 (aged 90–91)
- Education: Massachusetts College of Art and Design
- Spouse: Ros Barron

Harris Barron (1926-2017) was an artist, educator, writer, pilot, and adventurer who founded both the ZONE visual theatre group and the Studio for Interrelated Media (SIM) at the Massachusetts College of Art and Design in 1970.

== Early life and education ==
Harris Barron was born in 1926 in Boston, Massachusetts.

Barron enlisted in the US Navy in 1944 as a flyer, based at the Pearl Harbor Naval Air Station. After being discharged in 1947, he entered Vesper George Art School in Boston's South End. In 1949, he was exposed to many artists from New York City at a summer painting program on Nantucket Island. Barron moved to New York City and worked as a graphic artist. He met his wife, Ros at Massachusetts College of Art, in 1951, married in 1953. Both graduated with BFA's in 1954 as two of Professor Charles Abbott's six initial majors in his new Ceramic Art program at the Massachusetts College of Art and Design in Boston. Barron also completed academic course requirements in Harvard's University Extension program.

== Artistic practice ==
Harris Barron began as a sculptor and painter, evolving into a performance artist, poet and writer. From 1956 to 1969 he was commissioned to design and execute many large scale architectural sculptures for new public buildings, collaborating with several prominent architects, including Walter Gropius, Hugh Stubbins, and Percival Goodman.

His work is found at the Mount Holyoke College theatre; Temple Israel in Boston; the West Hartford Community Center; Choate Rosemary Hall; the Wilmington Community Center; the Washington Park WMCA in Boston; The Parkside School in Columbus; and the Fitchburg Savings Bank, among many other places.

Barron's smaller-scaled sculptures have been shown in several solo exhibitions, including the Institute of Contemporary Art, Boston; Ward-Nasse Gallery and Sidney Kanegis Gallery, Boston; three shows with New York dealer, Bertha Schaeffer Gallery; at Clemson University, and in many group exhibitions in this country, including the Portland Museum of Art.

Harris and Ros Barron were Rockefeller Artists-in-Residence at WGBH—2, in the late 1960s, and involved with WGBH's New Television Workshop in the 1970s. Their experimental "visual theater" company, ZONE—formed with former studio assistant Alan Finneran— performed a major work, The Yellow Sound, at the Guggenheim Museum in New York City, and seeded the ideas behind the formation of the Studio for Interrelated Media program at the Massachusetts College of Art and Design. ZONE was active from 1968 to 1972 and produced a ten campus ZONE on Tour of New York State colleges, as well as six discrete works at venues such as MIT's Kresge Theatre (Computer Theatre); Harvard University (Grope Fest, a memorial to Walter Gropius); Ohio State University; and Brandeis University (Beyond Bauhaus Theatre), each of which was a major undertaking involving live performers with elaborate electronic costumes, large mobile set pieces, complicated original sound, text, and projection systems, custom hardware, and a knowledgeable technical crew. Fundamentally, ZONE was a laboratory for the exploration of art in a real-time/space context.

Since 1988, Barron works primarily as a writer of poetry, short fiction and a memoir—The Birth of Eagle Air. In 1988, along with another pilot from the MIT Soaring Association Frank Scarabino, flew an antique, open cockpit biplane from Massachusetts to California over a seven-day period. That unusual flight initiated a book, Spaces in the Air about "crossing America, at sometimes rather low altitudes, with nothing between me and the landscape below but air."

== Teaching ==
Harris Barron retired from his professorship at MassArt in 1988. His original inspirations and ideas are still the foundation for many of the curricular decisions made within SIM in its effort to combine performance, innovative technology, sound, light, projected image, considerations of space, wherein idea-based art-making is stressed. Barron's thesis maintains that original art originates in the mind; all else is application.

Barron was provocative and inspirational in the classroom. He had high expectations of his students and nothing went unnoticed. For many years, Barron's message to his students, "Shared experience creates community." was painted on the back wall of SIM's Longwood Theater on Brookline Avenue in Boston. This concept still infuses the Studio today.

After joining the MIT Soaring Club in 1975, Barron, as an instructor-in-training, taught student pilots to appreciate "motorless flight"—sailplane soaring—"using the mind and acute observation of atmospheric changes to sustain the self at altitude."
