= Hara (Bible) =

Biblical place name

Hara (הרא) in the Bible is a place in Assyria. It is mentioned in the first book of Chronicles, chapter 5, verse 26 as a place of exile.

Hara is not mentioned in the Septuagint.
