= Haritha (organisation) =

Students wing of Union Muslim League

Haritha (Girl's wing of MSF)
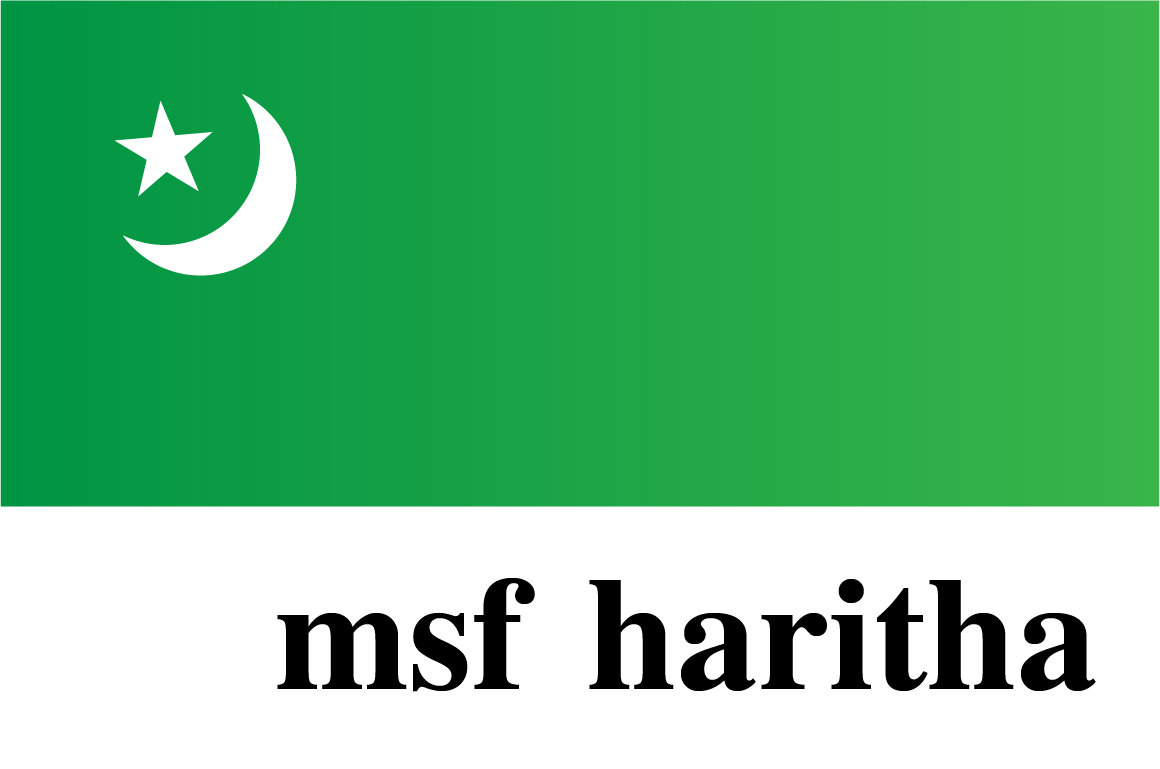
- Formation: 11 August 2012 (14 years ago)
- Type: Student wing
- Legal status: Active
- Headquarters: Calicut, Kerala, India
- Region served: India
- Chairperson: Ayisha Mariyam
- General Convenor: Fidha TP
- Treasurer: Riswana Sherin
- Parent organization: Indian Union Muslim League (IUML)

MSF Haritha or Haritha is a Girl's students wing of MSF - Indian Union Muslim League affiliated to the IUML

== History ==
MSF state conference of 2011 triggered the birth of Haritha. Around 1,500 girls had registered online, then Haritha was officially founded in 2012 at Kozhikode, Kerala with Najma Thabsheera and Fathima Thahiliya as its main organiser and Fathima Thahiliya as the founding general secretary. The original group consisted of Najma Thabsheera and Shafeena Kannur. It functioned as the student wing of Indian Union Muslim League. While Shafeena Kannur was the President, HARITHA took a leading role in the Justice for women, Women empowerment and opposition campaign against the communist state government.

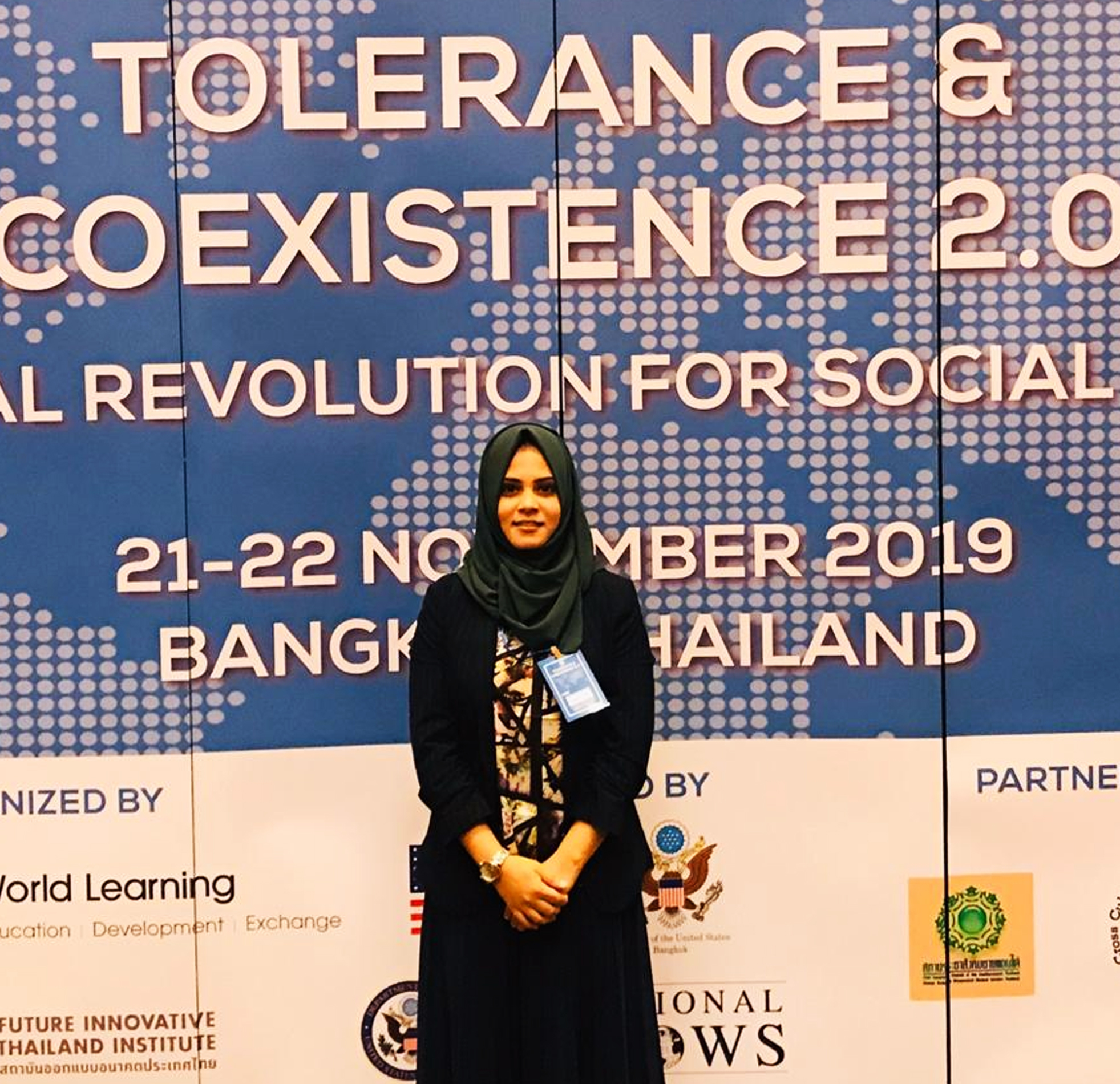
Fathima Thahiliya (founding general secretary of Haritha

== Haritha State Office bearers ==
Current office bearers
Name	Designation	District
Ayisha Mariyam	President	Palakkad
Fidha TP	General Secretary	Malappuram
Riswana nasrin	Treasure	Malappuram
Najwa Haneena	Vice President	Malappuram
Shahida Rasheed	Vice President	Kasargode
Ayisha Mariyam	Vice President	Palakkad
Afshila	Secretary	Kozhikkode
Fayisha	Secretary	Thiruvananthapuram
Akheela Farshana	Secretary	Ernakulam

== Activities ==
=== Protest and demands ===
Haritha has campus protested against the Citizenship Amendment Act in The women of Shaheen Bagh
