= Hara (sculpture) =

Public sculpture in Wisconsin

- Artist: Deborah Butterfield
- Year: 1989
- Type: bronze
- Dimensions: 220 cm × 250 cm × 120 cm (85 in × 100 in × 48 in)
- Location: Lynden Sculpture Garden; Milwaukee, Wisconsin; 43°10′28.7″N 87°56′08.3″W

Hara is a public art work by American artist Deborah Butterfield located at the Lynden Sculpture Garden near Milwaukee, Wisconsin. The sculpture is in the form of horse; it is installed on the lawn.
