= Hara Island =

Island in Estonia

Native name: Hara saar
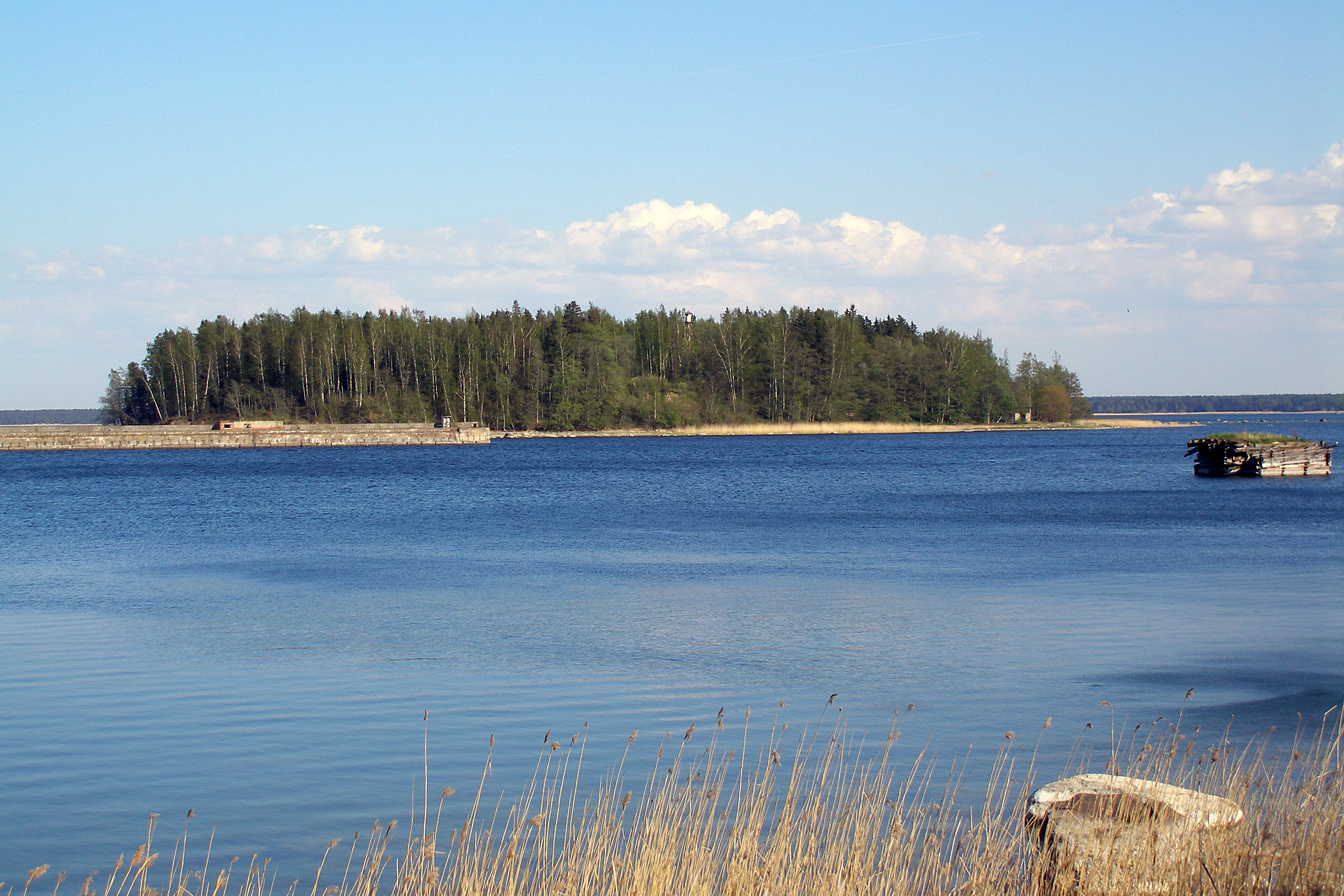
- Interactive map of Hara Island

Geography
- Location: Baltic Sea
- Coordinates: 59°35′04″N 25°37′30″E
- Area: 0.11 km^{2} (0.042 sq mi)
- Highest elevation: 13 m (43 ft)

Administration
- Estonia
- County: Harju
- Municipality: Kuusalu Parish

Demographics
- Population: 0

Hara (Estonian: Hara saar) is a small uninhabited island off the northern coast of Estonia in the Gulf of Finland. It has an area of 10 hectares. The highest point of the island is 13 meters above the sea level.

== History ==
Prior to the Second World War, the island had a few families as permanent inhabitants and a small fish factory operated there. After the war, the small port facing the island on the mainland was taken over by the Soviet Navy and used as a naval training area. The island's inhabitants were removed and a Soviet submarine base was constructed with facilities to demagnetise the vessels' steel hulls. The Soviets departed in 1991; the base remains, derelict.
