= Harit (name) =

Harit is an Indian given name and surname. Notable people with the name include:

- Harit Nagpal (born 1961), Indian businessman
- Amine Harit (born 1997), French footballer
- Ram Babu Harit (born 1957), Indian politician
