= Hareth Al Naif =

Syrian footballer (born 1993)

Personal information
- Full name: Hareth Kamal Al Naif
- Date of birth: 20 January 1993 (age 33)
- Place of birth: Syria
- Position: Midfielder

Team information
- Current team: Al-Karamah

Senior career*
Years	Team	Apps	(Gls)
2011–2019	Al Futowa		
2013	→Al-Wahda (loan)		
2019	Tishreen		
2019–2020	Al-Yaqdhah		
2020–	Al-Karamah		

International career^{‡}
2011–2012	Syria U-20		
- * Club domestic league appearances and goals ‡ National team caps and goals as of 11 November 2011

Hareth Al Naif (Arabic: حارث النايف; born 20 January 1993) is a Syrian professional footballer who plays as a midfielder for Syrian Premier League club Al-Karamah.

== Club career ==
Al Naif started his career with Al Futowa in 2011. He transferred to Tishreen, then Al-Yaqdhah in 2019. He joined Al-Karamah in September 2020.
