= Haras =

Haras may refer to:

- Al-Haras or the Haras, a bodyguard unit in service of caliphs during the Umayyad and the Abbasid caliphates
- Haras Fyre (born 1953), an American songwriter, singer and multi-instrumentalist
- Oleh Haras (Russian: Олег Зиновьевич Гарас, born 1976), a Ukrainian professional football player
