= Batn-Ihrît =

Populated place in Faiyum Governoreate, Egypt

Batn-Ihrît عزبة بطن إهريت Batn el-Harit
- Village
- Location within Egypt
- Coordinates: 29.3633°N 30.58824°E
- Country: Egypt
- Governorate: Faiyum
- Municipal Division: Yousef El Seddik
- Time zone: UTC+2 (EET)
  - Summer (DST): UTC+3 (EEST)

Batn-Ihrît or Batn el-Harit (Arabic: بعزبة بطن إهريت) is a village in the Yousef El Seddik district of Faiyum Governorate in Egypt.

The village is located in an area of archaeological significance, approximately 3 kilometers North-West of Kharabet Ihrit (the ruins of the ancient village of Theadelphia). The archaeological site has in the past also been known as Batn el-Harit or Harit so the village is often mistaken for the archaeological site in literature.
