= Papyrus =

Writing material made from a reed-like plant

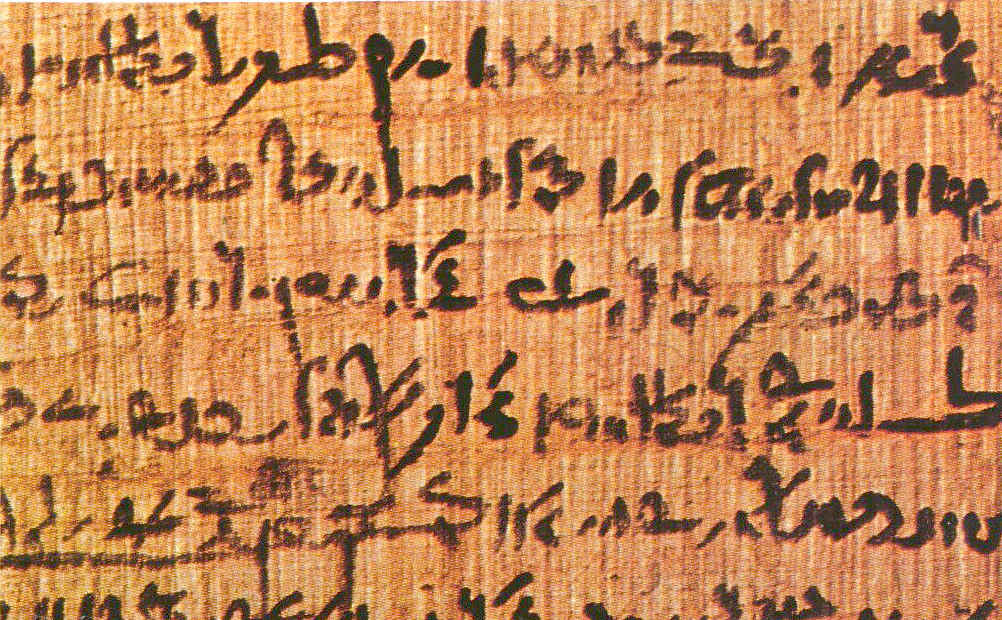
Papyrus (P. BM EA 10591 recto column IX, beginning of lines 13–17)

Papyrus (/pəˈpaɪrəs/ pə-PY-rəs) is a substance used in ancient times as a writing surface. Similar to thick paper, it was first known to have been used in Egypt (at least as far back as the First Dynasty) as the papyrus plant from which it was created was once abundant across the Nile Delta. Papyrus was made from the pith of the papyrus plant, Cyperus papyrus, a wetland sedge. Papyrus (plural: papyri or papyruses) can also refer to a document written on sheets of such material, joined side by side and rolled up into a scroll, an early form of a book.

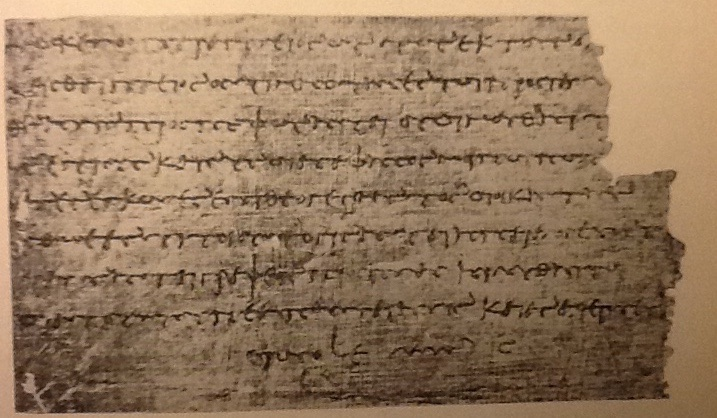
An official letter on a papyrus of the 3rd century BCE

Papyrus was also used as a writing material in the Mediterranean region. In addition to writing material, ancient Egyptians used the papyrus reeds in the construction of other products, such as reed boats, mats, rope, sandals, and baskets.

== History ==
Papyrus was first manufactured in Egypt as far back as the 3rd millennium BCE. The earliest archaeological evidence of papyrus was excavated in 2012 and 2013 at Wadi al-Jarf, an ancient Egyptian harbor located on the Red Sea coast. These documents, the Diary of Merer, date from c. 2560–2550 BCE (end of the reign of Khufu). The papyrus rolls describe the last years of building the Great Pyramid of Giza.

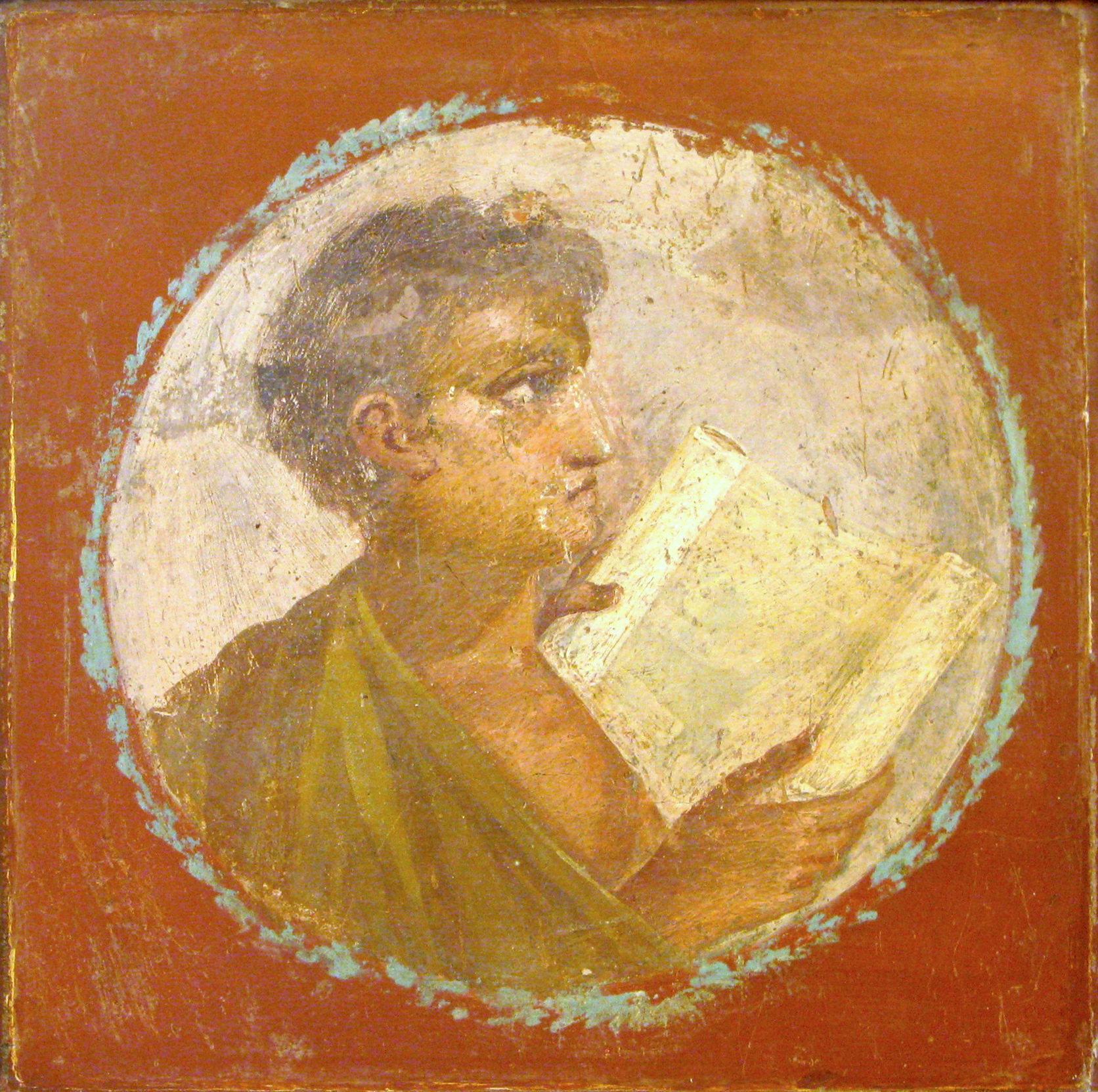
Roman portraiture fresco of a young man with a papyrus scroll, from Herculaneum, 1st century CE

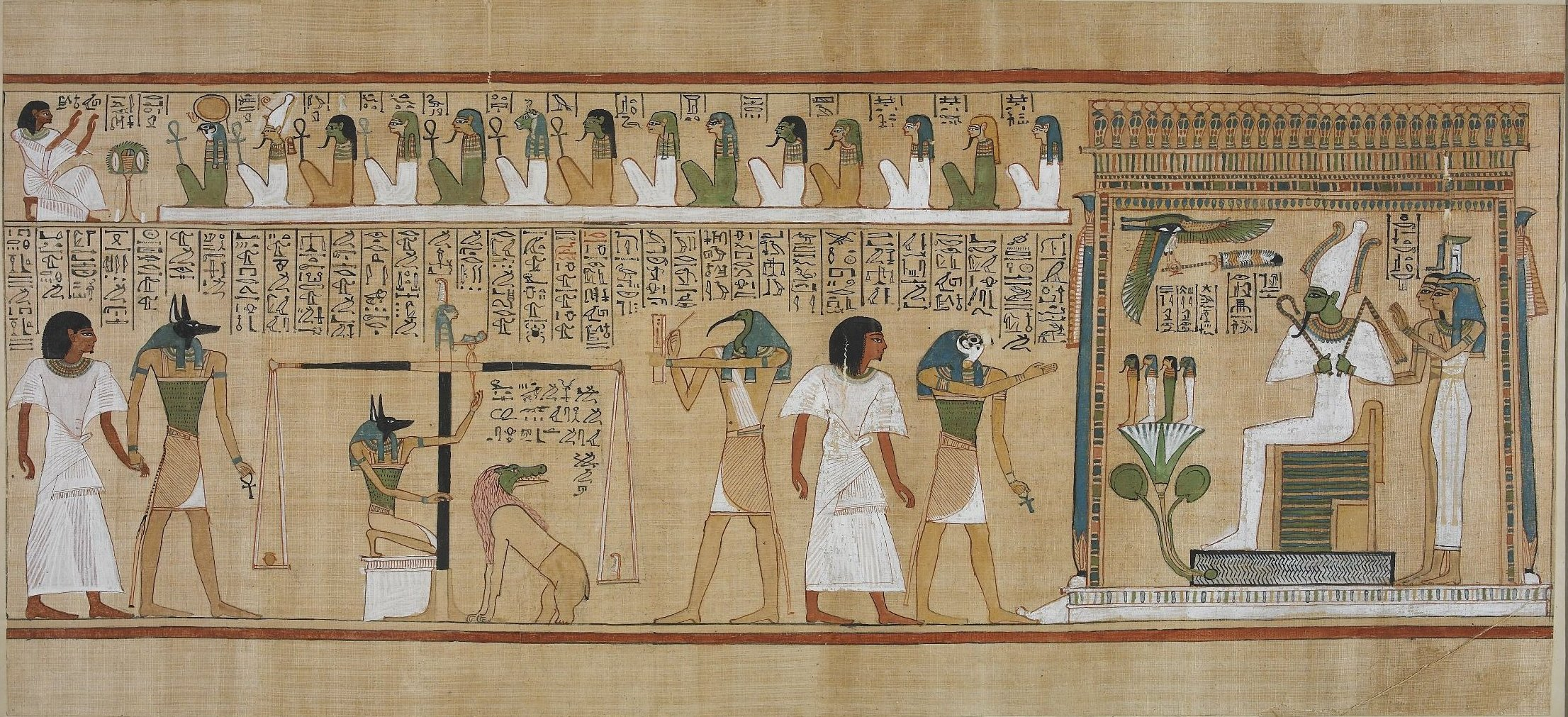

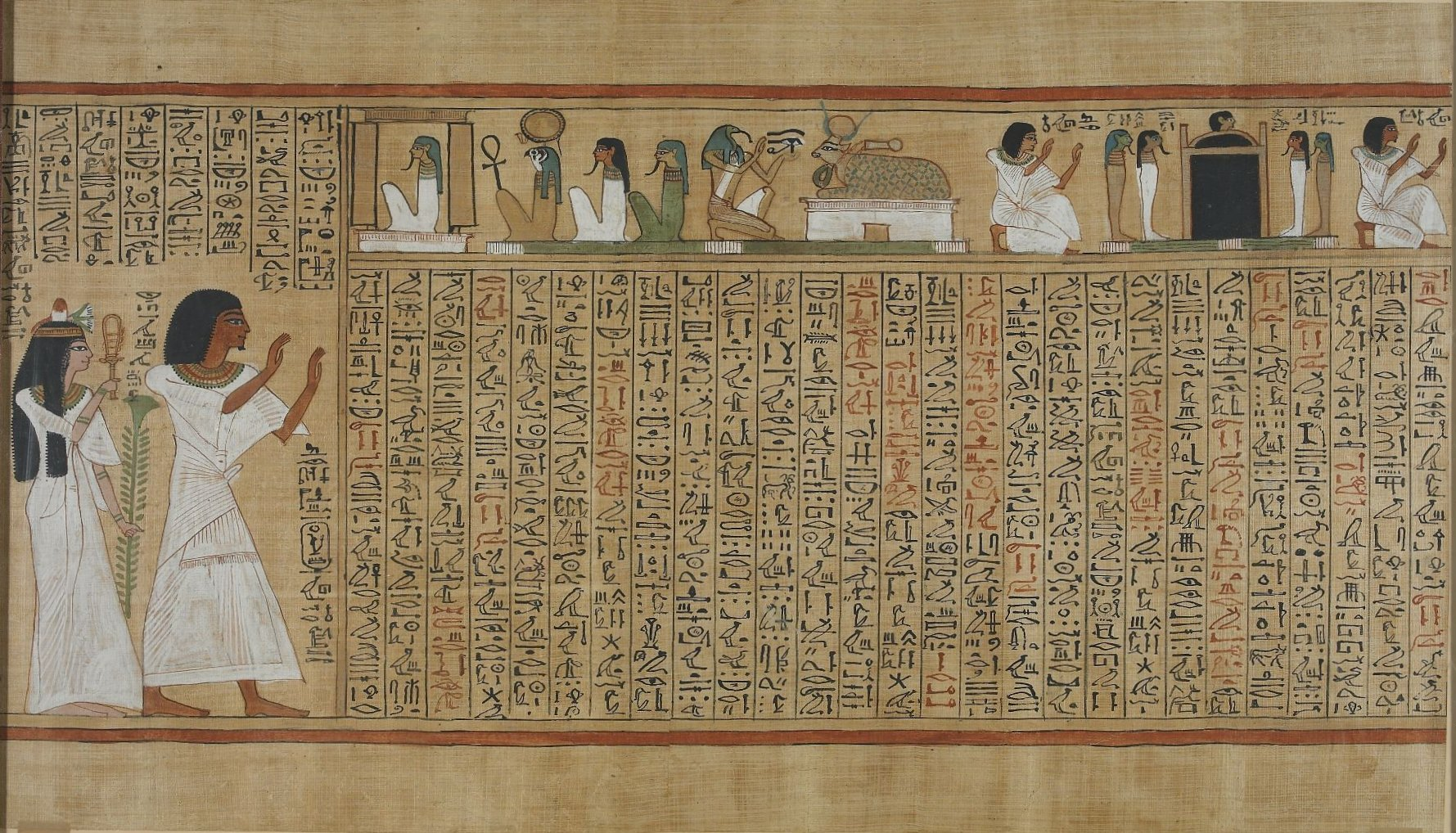
Sections of Hunefer's Book of the Dead written on papyrus

For multiple millennia, papyrus was commonly rolled into scrolls as a form of storage. However, at some point late in its history, papyrus began being collected together in the form of codices akin to the modern book. This may have been mimicking the book-form of codices created with parchment. Early Christian writers soon adopted the codex form, and in the Greco-Roman world, it became common to cut sheets from papyrus rolls to form codices. Codices were an improvement on the papyrus scroll, as the papyrus was not pliable enough to fold without cracking, and a long roll, or scroll, was required to create large-volume texts. Papyrus had the advantage of being relatively cheap and easy to produce, but it was fragile and susceptible to both moisture and excessive dryness. Unless the papyrus was of perfect quality, the writing surface was irregular, and the range of media that could be used was also limited.

Papyrus was gradually overtaken in West Asia and Europe by a rival writing surface that rose in prominence known as parchment, which was made from animal skins. By the beginning of the 4th century CE, the most important books began to be manufactured in parchment, and works worth preserving were transferred from papyrus to parchment. Parchment had significant advantages over papyrus, including higher durability in moist climates and being more conducive to writing on both sides of the surface. The main advantage of papyrus had been its cheaper raw material: the papyrus plant is easy to cultivate in a suitable climate and produces more writing material than animal hides (the most expensive books, made from foetal vellum, would take up to dozens of bovine fetuses to produce). However, as trade networks declined, the availability of papyrus outside the range of the papyrus plant became limited and it thus lost its cost advantage.

Papyrus's last appearance in the Merovingian chancery was with a document from 692 CE, though it was known in Gaul until the middle of the following century. The latest certain dates for the use of papyrus in Europe are 1057 for a papal decree (typically conservative, all papal bulls were on papyrus until 1022), under Pope Victor II, and 1087 for an Arabic document. Its use in Egypt continued until it was replaced by less expensive paper introduced by the Islamic world. By the 12th century, parchment and paper were in use in the Byzantine Empire, but papyrus was still an option.

Until the middle of the 19th century, only some isolated documents written on papyrus were known, and museums simply showed them as curiosities. They did not contain literary works. The first modern discovery of papyri rolls was made at Herculaneum in 1752. Until then, the only papyri known had been a few surviving from medieval times. Scholarly investigations began with the Dutch historian Caspar Jacob Christiaan Reuvens (1793–1835). He wrote about the content of the Leyden papyrus, published in 1830. The first publication has been credited to the British scholar Charles Wycliffe Goodwin (1817–1878), who published for the Cambridge Antiquarian Society one of the Papyri Graecae Magicae V, translated into English with commentary in 1853.

=== Varying quality ===
Papyrus was made in several qualities and prices. Pliny the Elder and Isidore of Seville described six variations of papyrus that were sold in the Roman market of the day. These were graded by quality based on how fine, firm, white, and smooth the writing surface was. Grades ranged from the superfine Augustan, which was produced in sheets of 13 digits (10 inches) wide, to the least expensive and most coarse, measuring six digits (four inches) wide. Materials deemed unusable for writing or less than six digits were considered commercial quality and were pasted edge to edge to be used only for wrapping.

== Etymology ==
The English word papyrus derives, via Latin, from Greek πάπυρος (papyros), a loanword of unknown (perhaps Pre-Greek) origin. Greek has a second word for it, βύβλος (byblos), said to derive from the name of the Phoenician city of Byblos. The Greek writer Theophrastus, who flourished during the 4th century BCE, uses papyros when referring to the plant used as a foodstuff and byblos for the same plant when used for nonfood products, such as cordage, basketry, or writing surfaces. The more specific term βίβλος biblos, which finds its way into English in such words as 'bibliography', 'bibliophile', and 'bible', refers to the inner bark of the papyrus plant. Papyrus is also the etymon of 'paper', a similar substance.

In the Egyptian language, papyrus was called wadj (w3ḏ), tjufy (ṯwfy or ṯwfj), or djet (ḏt); the term ṯwfj/y survives loaned into Biblical Hebrew as סוּף suf.

== Documents written on papyrus ==
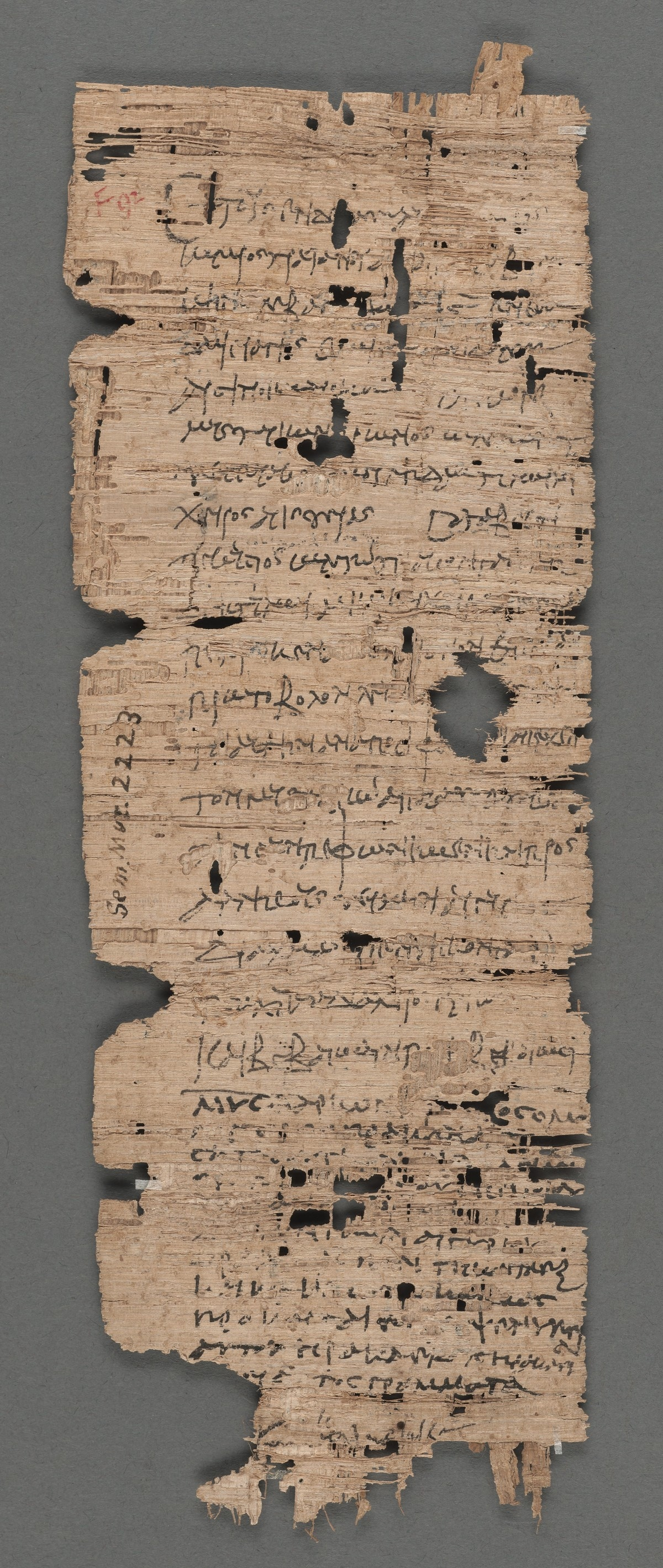
Bill of sale for a donkey in Greek, 126 CE; papyrus; 19.3 by 7.2 cm, MS Gr SM2223, Houghton Library, Harvard University

The word for the material papyrus is also used to designate documents written on sheets of it, often rolled up into scrolls. The plural for such documents is papyri. Historical papyri are given identifying names – generally the name of the discoverer, first owner, or institution where they are kept – and numbered, such as "Papyrus Harris I". Often an abbreviated form is used, such as "pHarris I". These documents provide important information on ancient writings; they give us the only extant copy of Menander, the Egyptian Book of the Dead, Egyptian treatises on medicine (the Ebers Papyrus) and on surgery (the Edwin Smith papyrus), Egyptian mathematical treatises (the Rhind papyrus), and Egyptian folk tales (the Westcar Papyrus). When, in the 18th century, a library of ancient papyri was found in Herculaneum, ripples of expectation spread among the learned men of the time. However, since these papyri were badly charred, their unscrolling and deciphering are still going on today.

== Manufacture and use ==
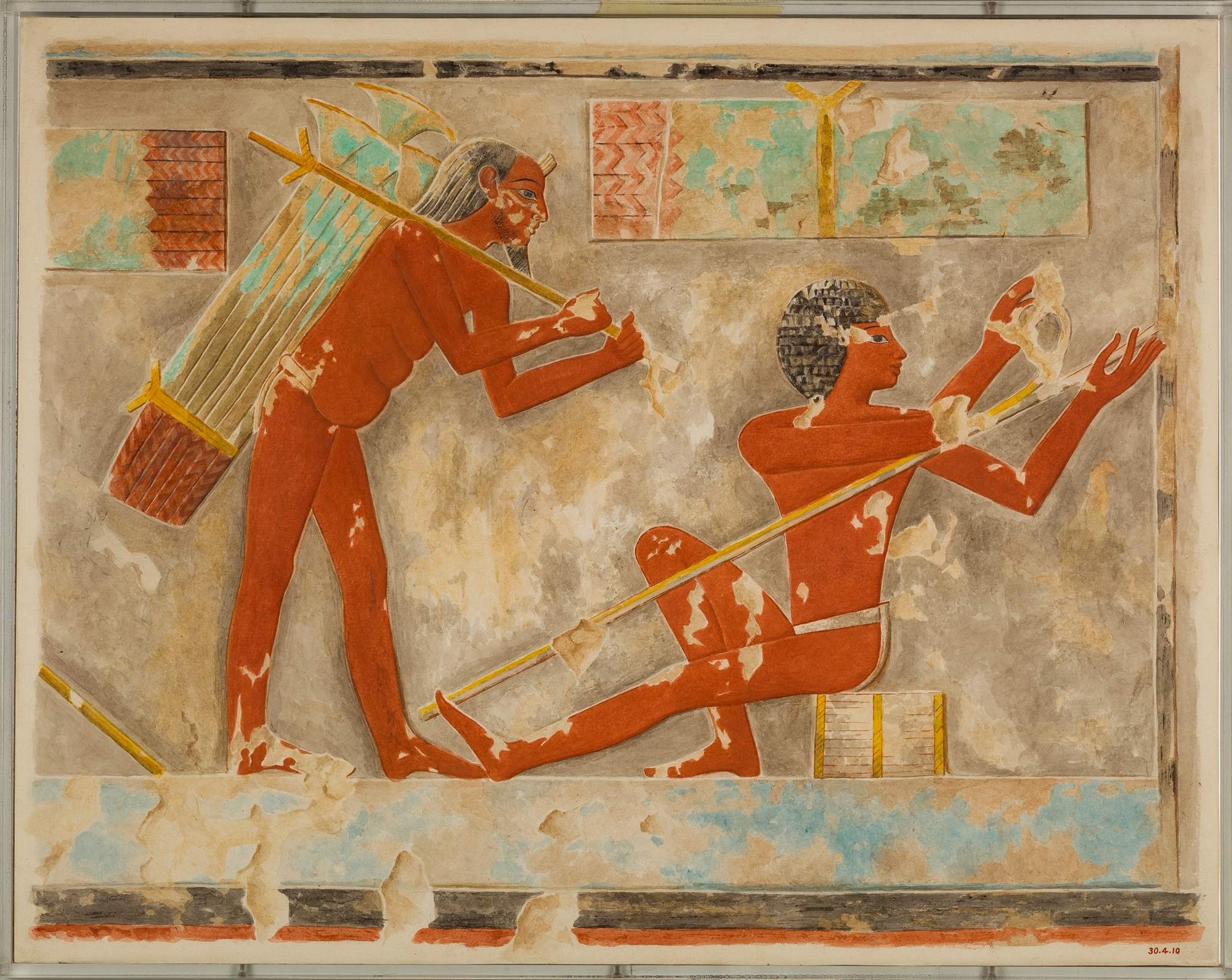
Men splitting papyrus, Tomb of Puyemré; Metropolitan Museum of Art

Different ways of cutting papyrus stem and making of papyrus sheet

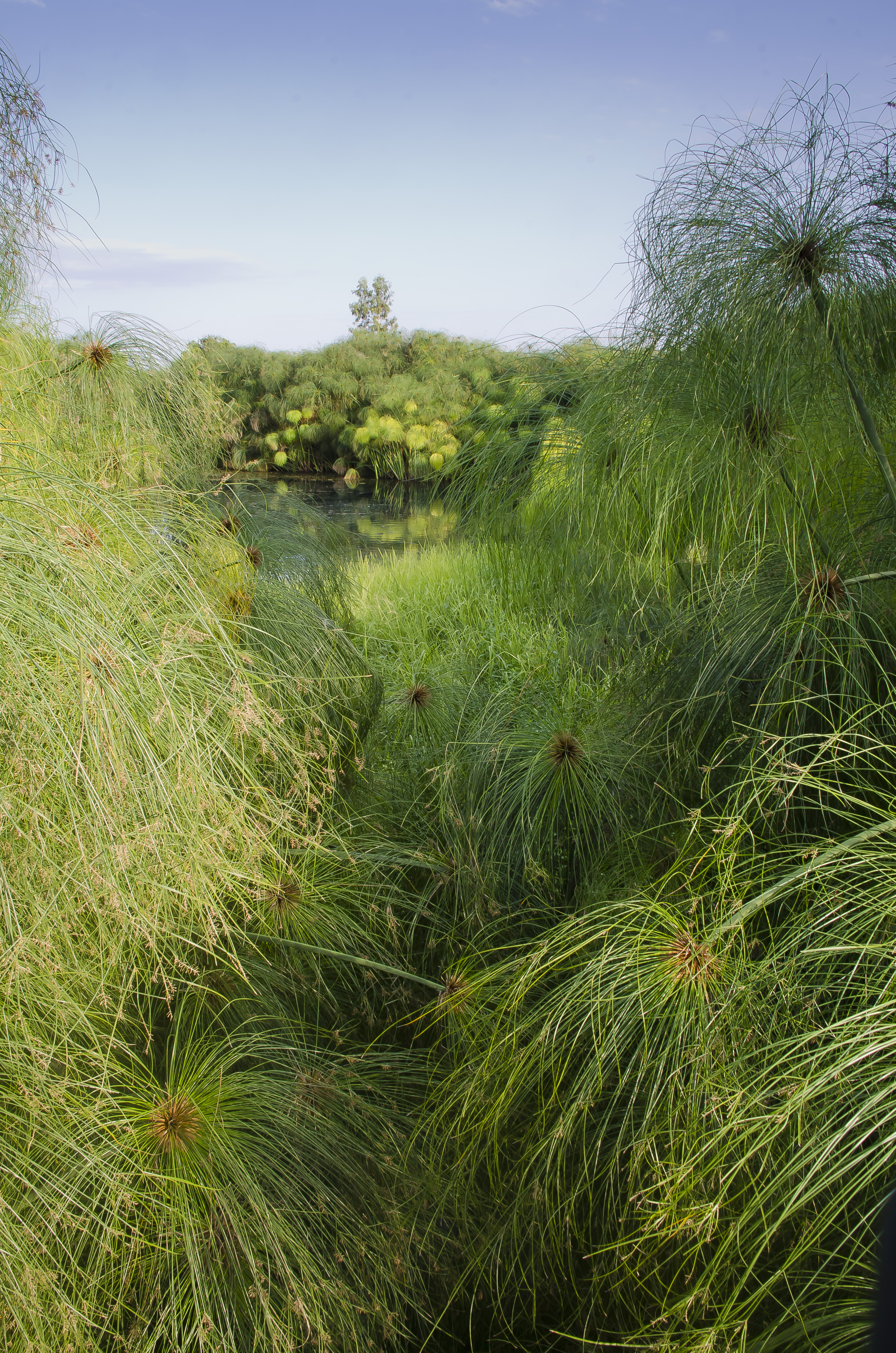
Papyrus plants near Syracuse, Sicily

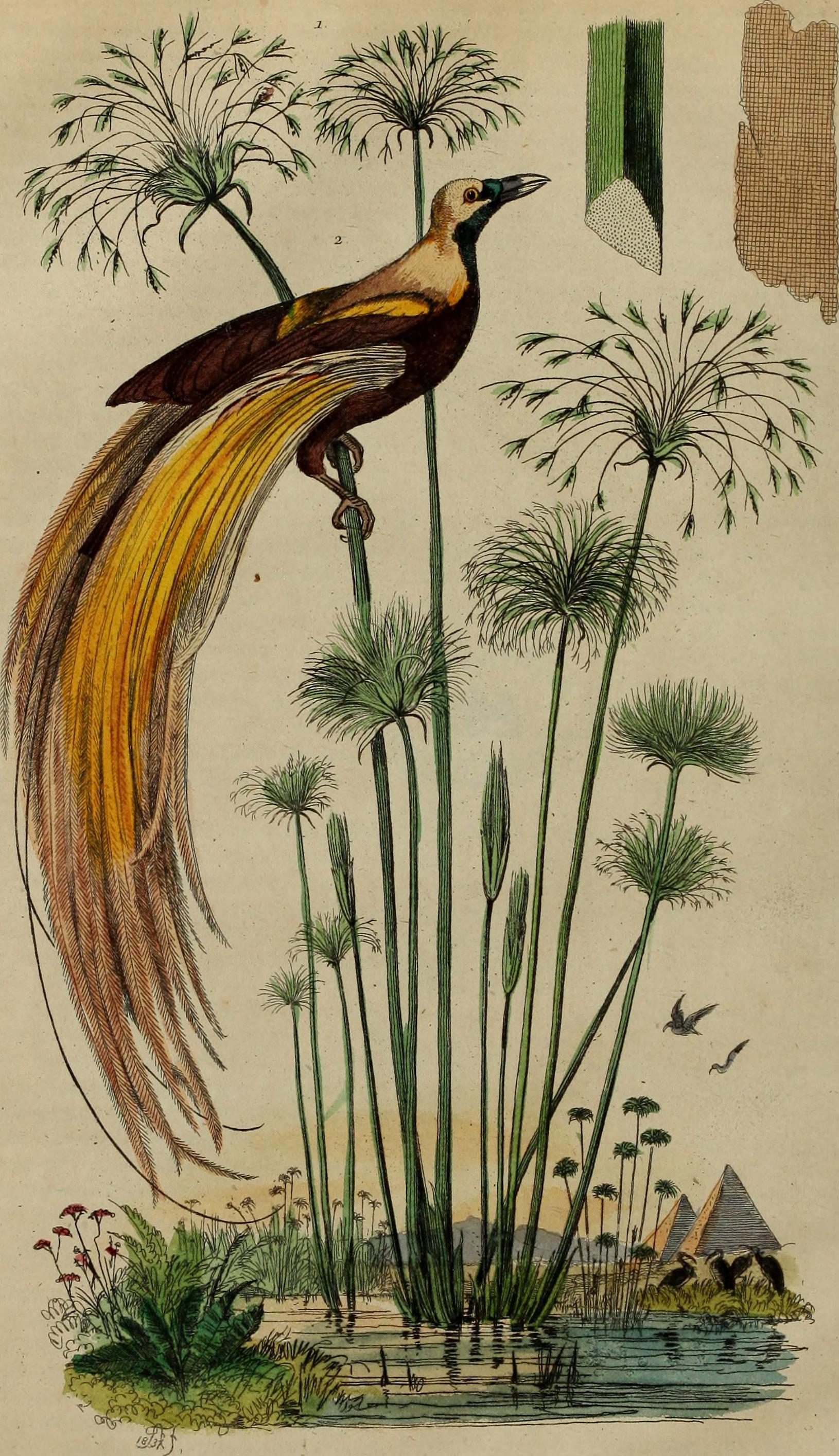
Drawing of a greater bird of paradise and the papyrus plant

Papyrus was made from the stem of the papyrus plant, Cyperus papyrus. The outer rind was first removed, and the sticky fibrous inner pith cut lengthwise into thin strips about 40 cm (16 in) long. The strips were then placed side by side on a hard surface with their edges slightly overlapping, and then another layer of strips was laid on top at right angles. The strips may have been soaked in water long enough for decomposition to begin, perhaps increasing adhesion, but this is not certain. The two layers possibly were glued together. While still moist, the two layers were hammered together, mashing the layers into a single sheet. The sheet was then dried under pressure. After drying, the sheet was polished with a rounded object, possibly a stone, seashell, or round hardwood.

Sheets, or mollema, could be cut to fit the obligatory size or glued together to create a longer roll. The point where the mollema are joined with glue is called the kollesis. A wooden stick would be attached to the last sheet in a roll, making it easier to handle. To form the long strip scrolls required, several such sheets were united and placed so all the horizontal fibres parallel with the roll's length were on one side and all the vertical fibres on the other. Normally, texts were first written on the recto, the lines following the fibres, parallel to the long edges of the scroll. Secondarily, papyrus was often reused, writing across the fibres on the verso.

One source used for determining the method by which papyrus was created in antiquity is through the examination of tombs in the ancient Egyptian city of Thebes, which housed a necropolis containing many murals displaying the process of papyrus-making. The Roman commander Pliny the Elder also describes the methods of preparing papyrus in his Naturalis Historia.

In a dry climate, like that of Egypt, papyrus is stable, formed as it is of highly rot-resistant cellulose, but storage in humid conditions can result in molds attacking and destroying the material. Library papyrus rolls were stored in wooden boxes and chests made in the form of statues. Papyrus scrolls were organized according to subject or author and identified with clay labels that specified their contents without having to unroll the scroll. In European conditions, papyrus seems to have lasted only a matter of decades; a 200-year-old papyrus was considered extraordinary. Imported papyrus once commonplace in Greece and Italy has since deteriorated beyond repair, but papyri are still being found in Egypt; extraordinary examples include the Elephantine papyri and the famous finds at Oxyrhynchus and Nag Hammadi. The Villa of the Papyri at Herculaneum, containing the library of Lucius Calpurnius Piso Caesoninus, Julius Caesar's father-in-law, was preserved by the eruption of Mount Vesuvius but has only been partially excavated.

Sporadic attempts to revive the manufacture of papyrus have been made since the mid-18th century. Scottish explorer James Bruce experimented in the late 18th century with papyrus plants from Sudan, for papyrus had become extinct in Egypt. Also in the 18th century, Sicilian Saverio Landolina manufactured papyrus at Syracuse, where papyrus plants had continued to grow in the wild. During the 1920s, when Egyptologist Battiscombe Gunn lived in Maadi, outside Cairo, he experimented with the manufacture of papyrus, growing the plant in his garden. He beat the sliced papyrus stalks between two layers of linen and produced successful examples of papyrus, one of which was exhibited in the Egyptian Museum in Cairo. The modern technique of papyrus production used in Egypt for the tourist trade was developed in 1962 by the Egyptian engineer Hassan Ragab using plants that had been reintroduced into Egypt in 1872 from France. Both Sicily and Egypt have centres of limited papyrus production.

Papyrus is still used by communities living in the vicinity of swamps, to the extent that rural householders derive up to 75% of their income from swamp goods. Particularly in East and Central Africa, people harvest papyrus, which is used to manufacture items that are sold or used locally. Examples include baskets, hats, fish traps, trays or winnowing mats, and floor mats. Papyrus is also used to make roofs, ceilings, rope, and fences. Although alternatives, such as eucalyptus, are increasingly available, papyrus is still used as fuel.

== Collections of papyrus ==
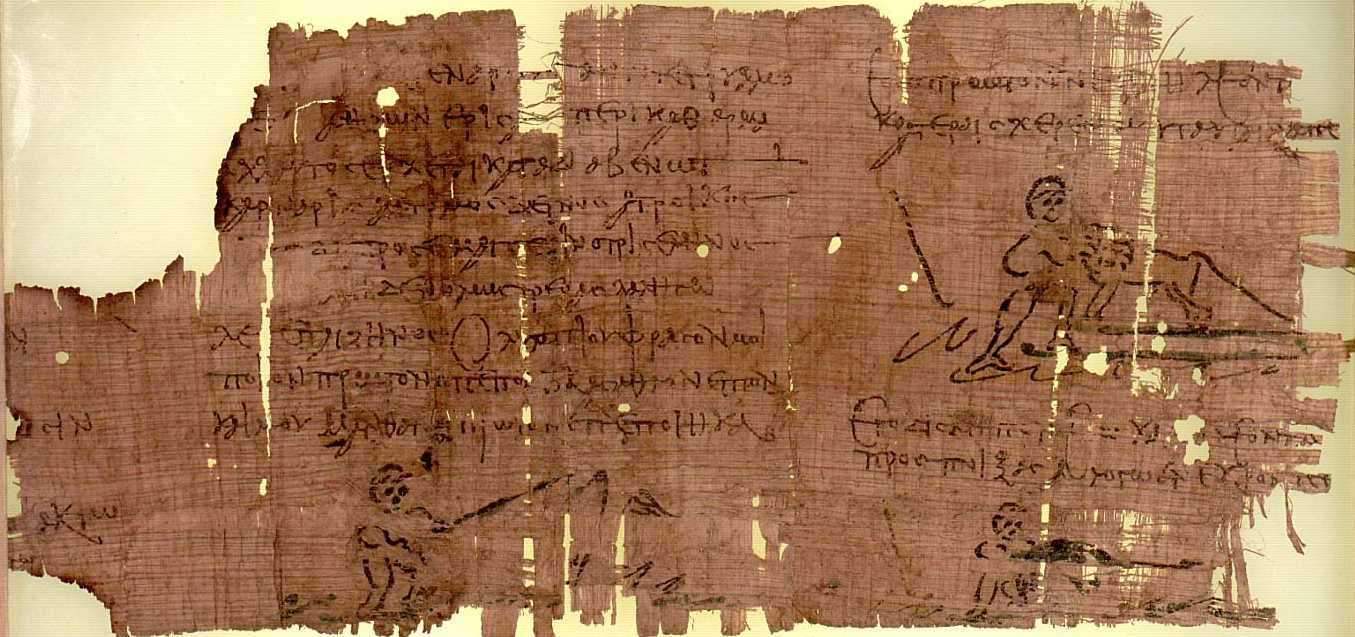
The Heracles Papyrus

- Amherst Papyri: this is a collection of William Tyssen-Amherst, 1st Baron Amherst of Hackney. It includes biblical manuscripts, early church fragments, and classical documents from the Ptolemaic, Roman, and Byzantine eras. The collection was edited by Bernard Grenfell and Arthur Hunt in 1900–1901. It is housed at the Morgan Library & Museum (New York).
- Archduke Rainer Collection, also known as the Vienna Papyrus Collection: is one of the world's largest collections of papyri (about 180,000 objects) in the Austrian National Library of Vienna.
- Berlin Papyrus Collection: housed in the Egyptian Museum and Papyrus Collection.
- Bodmer Papyri: this collection was purchased by Martin Bodmer in 1955–1956. Currently, it is housed in the Bibliotheca Bodmeriana in Cologny. It includes Greek and Coptic documents, classical texts, biblical books, and writing of the early churches.
- Chester Beatty Papyri: a collection of 11 codices acquired by Alfred Chester Beatty in 1930–1931 and 1935. It is housed at the Chester Beatty Library. The collection was edited by Frederic G. Kenyon.
- Colt Papyri, housed at the Morgan Library & Museum (New York).
- Dead Sea Scrolls: a collection of Second Temple Period Jewish manuscripts discovered in the West Bank between 1946 and 1956. The scrolls were penned using various writing materials, with 8 to 13% of them being written on papyrus. Most of the scrolls are currently housed at the Israel Museum's Shrine of the Book in Givat Ram, Jerusalem.
- Former private collection of Grigol Tsereteli: a collection up to one hundred Greek papyri, currently housed at Georgian National Centre of Manuscripts.
- The Herculaneum papyri: these papyri were found in Herculaneum in the 18th century, carbonised by the eruption of Mount Vesuvius. After some tinkering, a method was found to unroll and to read them. Most of them are housed at the Naples National Archaeological Museum.
- The Heroninos Archive: a collection of around a thousand papyrus documents, dealing with the management of a large Roman estate, dating to the 3rd century CE, found at the very end of the 19th century at Batn Ihrit, the site of ancient Theadelphia, in the Faiyum area of Egypt by Bernard Pyne Grenfell and Arthur Surridge Hunt. It is spread over many collections throughout the world.
- The Houghton's papyri: the collection at Houghton Library, Harvard University, was acquired between 1901 and 1909 thanks to a donation from the Egypt Exploration Fund.
- Martin Schøyen Collection: biblical manuscripts in Greek and Coptic, Dead Sea Scrolls, classical documents
- Michigan Papyrus Collection: this collection contains above 10,000 papyri fragments. It is housed at the University of Michigan.
- Oxyrhynchus Papyri: these numerous papyri fragments were discovered by Grenfell and Hunt in and around Oxyrhynchus. The publication of these papyri is still in progress. A large part of the Oxyrhynchus papyri are housed at the Ashmolean Museum in Oxford, others in the British Museum in London, in the Egyptian Museum in Cairo, and many other places.
- Princeton Papyri, housed at Princeton University
- Papiri della Società Italiana (PSI): a series, still in progress, published by the Società per la ricerca dei Papiri greci e latini in Egitto and from 1927 onwards by the succeeding Istituto Papirologico "G. Vitelli" in Florence. These papyri are situated at the institute itself and in the Biblioteca Laurenziana.
- Rylands Papyri: this collection contains above 700 papyri, with 31 ostraca and 54 codices. It is housed at the John Rylands University Library.
- Tebtunis Papyri: housed by the Bancroft Library at the University of California, Berkeley, this is a collection of more than 30,000 fragments dating from the 3rd century BCE through the 3rd century CE, found in the winter 1899–1900 at the site of ancient Tebtunis, Egypt, by an expedition team led by the British papyrologists Bernard P. Grenfell and Arthur S. Hunt.
- Washington University Papyri Collection: includes 445 manuscript fragments, dating from the 1st century BCE to the 8th century CE. Housed at the Washington University Libraries.
- Yale Papyrus Collection: housed by the Beinecke Library, it contains over six thousand inventoried items. It is cataloged, digitally scanned, and accessible online.

== Individual papyri ==
- Brooklyn Medical Papyrus: this papyrus focuses mainly on snakebites and their remedies. It speaks of remedial methods for venoms obtained from snakes, scorpions, and tarantulas. The Brooklyn Medical Papyrus currently resides in the Brooklyn Museum.
- Saite Oracle Papyrus: this papyrus located at the Brooklyn Museum records the petition of a man named Pemou on behalf of his father, Harsiese to ask their god for permission to change temples.
- Strasbourg papyrus
- Will of Naunakhte: found at Deir el-Medina and dating to the 20th dynasty, it is notable because it is a legal document for a non-noble woman.

== See also ==
- Other ancient writing materials:
  - Palm leaf manuscript (India)
  - Amate (Mesoamerica)
  - Bamboo and wooden strips (China)
  - Paper
  - Ostracon
  - Wax tablets
  - Clay tablets
  - Birch bark document
  - Parchment
    - Vellum
- Pliny the Elder
- Papyrology
- Papyrus sanitary pad
- Palimpsest
- For Egyptian papyri:
  - List of ancient Egyptian papyri
- Other papyri:
  - Elephantine papyri
  - Magdalen papyrus
  - Nag Hammadi library
  - New Testament papyri
- The papyrus plant in Egyptian art
  - Palmette
