= List of Natural Monuments of Japan (Kagawa) =

This list is of the Natural Monuments of Japan within the Prefecture of Kagawa.

== National Natural Monuments ==
As of 1 April 2021, twelve Natural Monuments have been designated, including one *Special Natural Monument.

Monument	Municipality	Comments	Image	Coordinates	Type	Ref.
*Chinese juniper at Hōshō-in; Juniperus chinensis 宝生院のシンパク; Hōshōin no shinpaku	Tonoshō			34°29′36″N 134°11′51″E	2.1	
Chinese silk chicken Gallus gallus domesticus 烏骨鶏; Ukkokei					1.4	
Amakawa Jinja Verdure 天川神社社叢; Amakawa Jinja shasō	Mannō			34°09′25″N 133°56′18″E	2.1	
Ōji Jinja Verdure 皇子神社社叢; Ōji Jinja shasō	Shōdoshima			34°25′54″N 134°14′00″E	2.1	
Kaburagoshi Lamprophyres 鹿浦越のランプロファイヤ岩脈; Kaburagoshi no ranpurofaiya ganmyaku	Higashikagawa			34°15′32″N 134°22′32″E	3.2	
Kinu Island and Marukame Island 絹島および丸亀島; Kinu-jima oyobi Marukame-jima	Higashikagawa			34°16′47″N 134°17′46″E	3.1,6,9	
Kotohira Giant Chinaberry Tree; Melia azedarach 琴平町の大センダン; Kotohira-chō no dai-sendan	Kotohira			34°11′17″N 133°49′20″E	2.1	
Sugao Jinja Verdure 菅生神社社叢; Sugao Jinja shasō	Mitoyo			34°06′56″N 133°43′11″E	2.1	
Japanese Sago Palm at Seigan-ji; Cycas revoluta 誓願寺のソテツ; Seiganji no sotetsu	Shōdoshima			34°27′42″N 134°14′37″E	2.1	
Mount Zōzu 象頭山; Zōzu-zan	Kotohira	also a Place of Scenic Beauty		34°11′16″N 133°48′08″E	3.2	
Spherical Norites of Marugami Island 円上島の球状ノーライト; Marugami no kyūjō nōraito	Kan'onji			34°09′17″N 133°27′09″E	3.1,10	
Yashima 屋島; Yashima	Takamatsu	also an Historic Site		34°21′06″N 134°06′29″E	3.1,10	

April 2021

== Prefectural Natural Monuments ==
As of 30 September 2020, twenty-nine Natural Monuments have been designated at a prefectural level.

Monument	Municipality	Comments	Image	Coordinates	Type	Ref.
Japanese macaques of Rōsandō; Macaca fuscata 老杉洞の日本サル群; Rōsandō no Nihon saru-gun	Shōdoshima			34°30′53″N 134°17′36″E		for all refs see
Japanese macaques of Chōshikei; Macaca fuscata 銚子渓の日本サル群; Chōshikei no Nihon saru-gun	Shōdoshima			34°30′53″N 134°17′36″E		
Bamboo lilies of Koyo Island; Lilium japonicum 小与島のササユリ; Koyo-shima no sasayuri	Sakaide			34°23′29″N 133°49′49″E		
Giant Camphor tree on Shishi-jima; Cinnamomum camphora 志々島の大くす; Shishi-jima no ō-kusu	Mitoyo			34°16′21″N 133°40′45″E		
Giant Camphor tree in the Precinct of Zentsū-ji; Cinnamomum camphora 善通寺境内の大グス; Zentsūji keidai no dai-gusu	Zentsūji			34°23′29″N 133°49′49″E		

== Municipal Natural Monuments ==
As of 1 May 2020, sixty-six Natural Monuments have been designated at a municipal level.

== See also ==
- Cultural Properties of Japan
- Parks and gardens in Kagawa Prefecture
- List of Places of Scenic Beauty of Japan (Kagawa)
- List of Historic Sites of Japan (Kagawa)
