= Manno (disambiguation) =

Manno is a Swiss municipality.

Manno may also refer to:

== People ==
- Manno (surname)
- Manno Wolf-Ferrari (1911–1994), Italian conductor
- Manno Charlemagne (1948–2017), Haitian political folk singer, songwriter and acoustic guitarist, political activist and politician nicknamed "Manno"
- Emmanuel Sanon (1951–2008), Haitian footballer nicknamed "Manno"

== Places ==
- Mannō, Kagawa, Japan, a town
  - Mannō Lake, a reservoir in the town

== See also ==
- Mano (disambiguation)
