= Kotohiki Hachimangū =

Shinto shrine in Kagawa Prefecture, Japan

Kotohiki Hachimangū 琴弾八幡宮
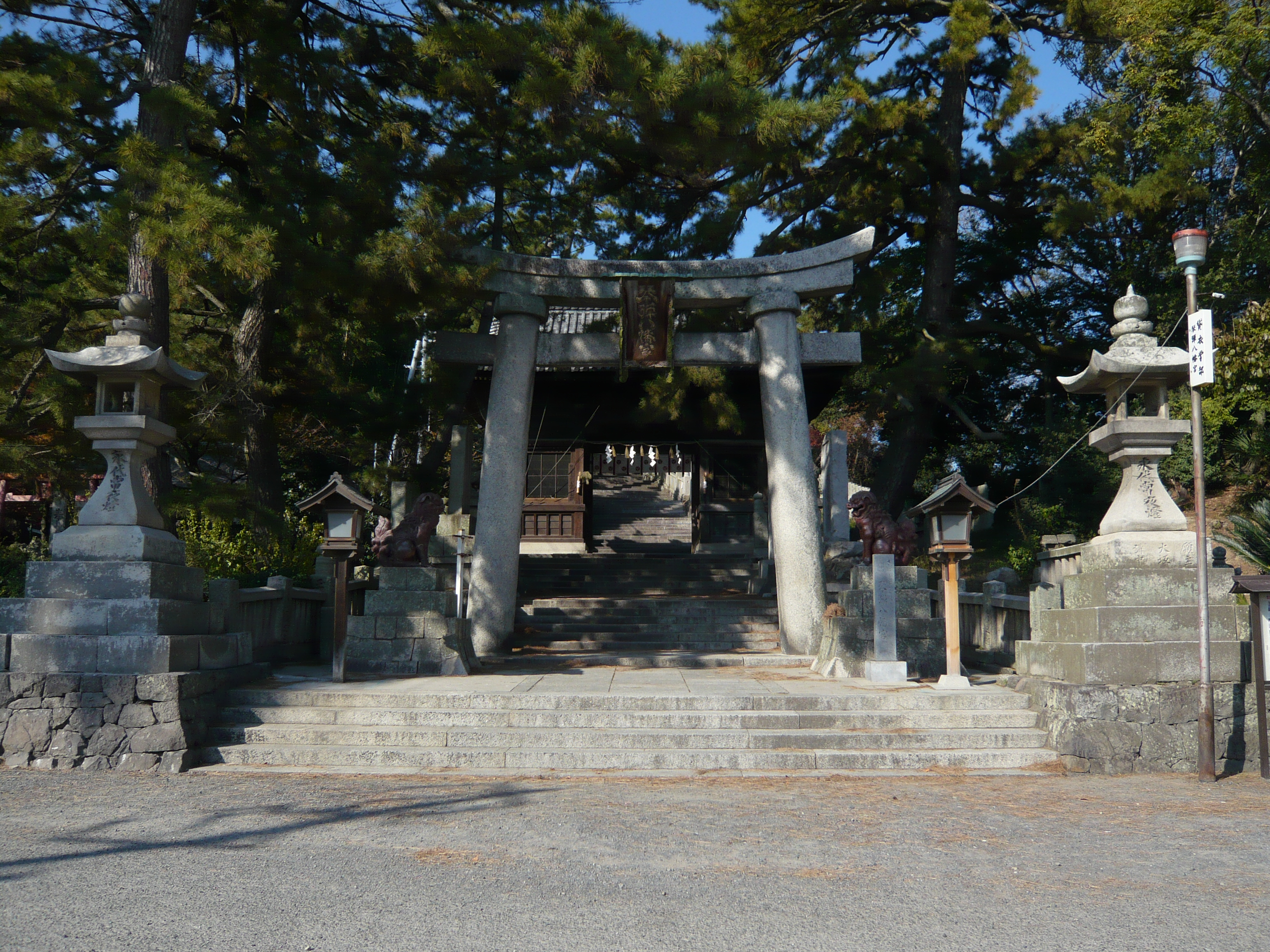
- Torii of Kotohiki Hachimangū

- Location within Japan

Religion
- Affiliation: Shinto
- Deity: Emperor Ōjin; Empress Jingū; Tamayori-bime
- Type: Hachiman shrine

Location
- Location: 1-1 Yahata-chō 1-chōme, Kan'onji Kagawa
- Coordinates: 34°07′54″N 133°38′52″E

Architecture
- Established: 703

Kotohiki Hachimangū (琴弾八幡宮) is a Shinto shrine in Kan'onji, Kagawa Prefecture, Japan. Located within Kotohiki Park, itself part of the Setonaikai National Park, there is an aetiological legend that sees the god Hachiman appearing to the eighth-century monk Nisshō Shōnin while he was playing a koto on board ship. The legend is depicted in the Sanuki-no-kuni Shippōzan Hachiman Kotobikigū engi, records that are an Important Cultural Property of the city. As a result of the enforced separation of Buddhism and Shinto during the Meiji period, the enshrined image of Amida Nyorai was transferred to nearby Kannon-ji. There is a lively annual festival.

== See also ==
- Hachiman shrine
- Shikoku 88 temple pilgrimage
- Shinbutsu bunri
