= Ibuki Island =

Island in Seto Inland Sea, Japan

Ibukijima
Native name: 伊吹島 Ibukijima
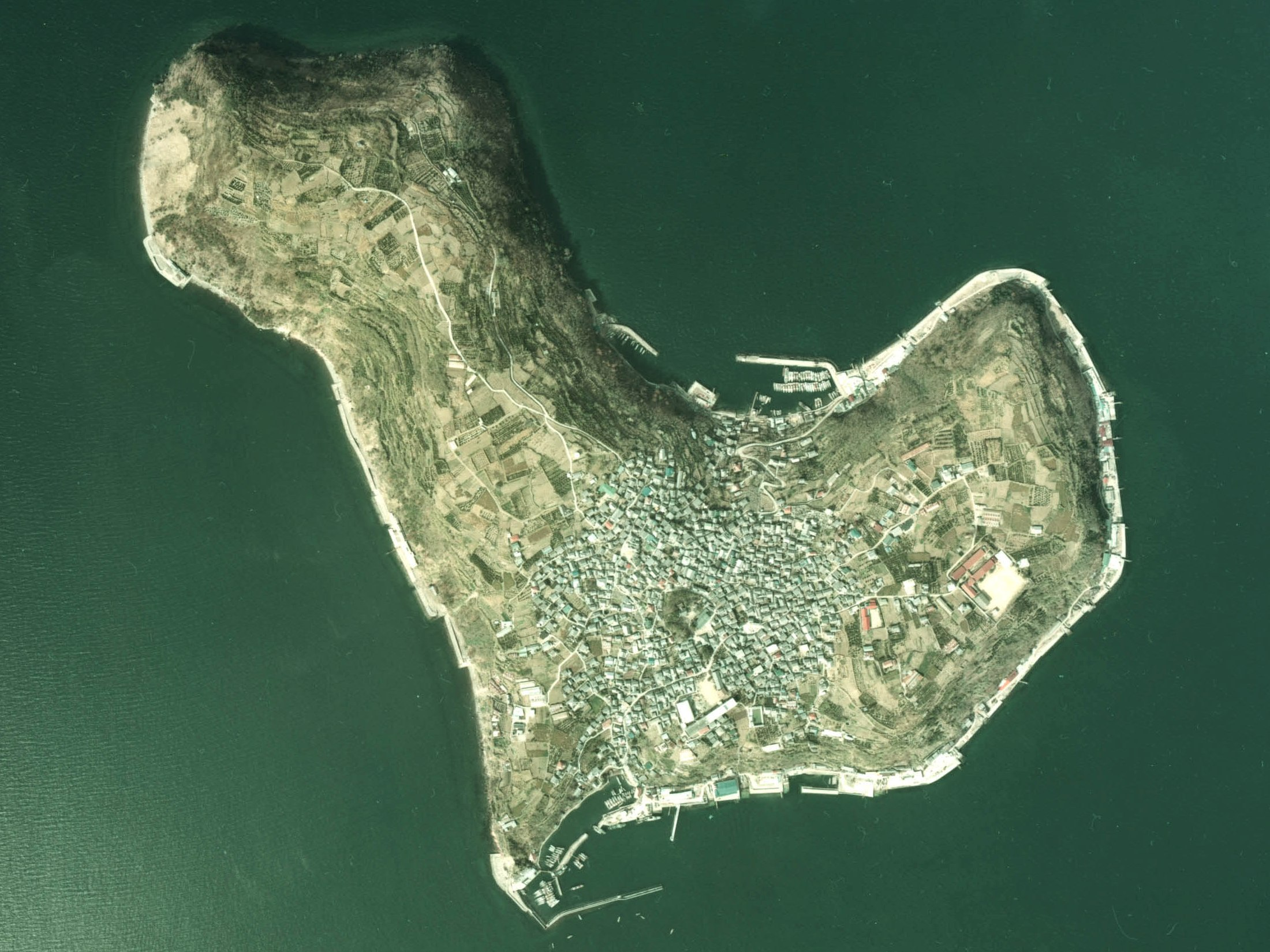
- Ibukijima in 1974

- Location within Kagawa Prefecture Location within Japan

Geography
- Location: Seto Inland Sea
- Coordinates: 34°8′N 133°32′E
- Area: 1.05 km^{2} (0.41 sq mi)
- Highest elevation: 121.51 m (398.65 ft)

Administration
- Japan
- Prefecture: Kagawa Prefecture
- City: Kan'onji

Ibuki island (伊吹島, Ibukijima) is an inhabited island located in the Seto Inland Sea between Honshū and Shikoku. It is administratively part of the city of Kan'onji, Kagawa, Japan. It is famous for producing high-quality iriko (dried sardines).

The island is approximately 10 kilometres (6.2 miles) away from Kan'onji Port, and has an area of 5.4 square kilometres (2.1 square miles). It has a population of 503 people as of 2018. Both electricity and water supply on the island are supplied from the mainland, and regular ships are in service from Maura Port on the south side of the island to the Shikoku mainland.

There are many steep cliffs around the island, forming a plateau, and houses are concentrated in the center of the island from north to south. The islands have been inhabited since prehistoric times, and stone tools from the Jomon period have been found in archaeological excavations. The main economic activity is fishing and the processing of sardines, which are used as the base of the broth for Sanuki udon.
