= Kotohiki Park =

Place of Scenic Beauty in Kagawa Prefecture, Japan

Coordinates: 34°08′01″N 133°38′32″E

- 琴弾公園
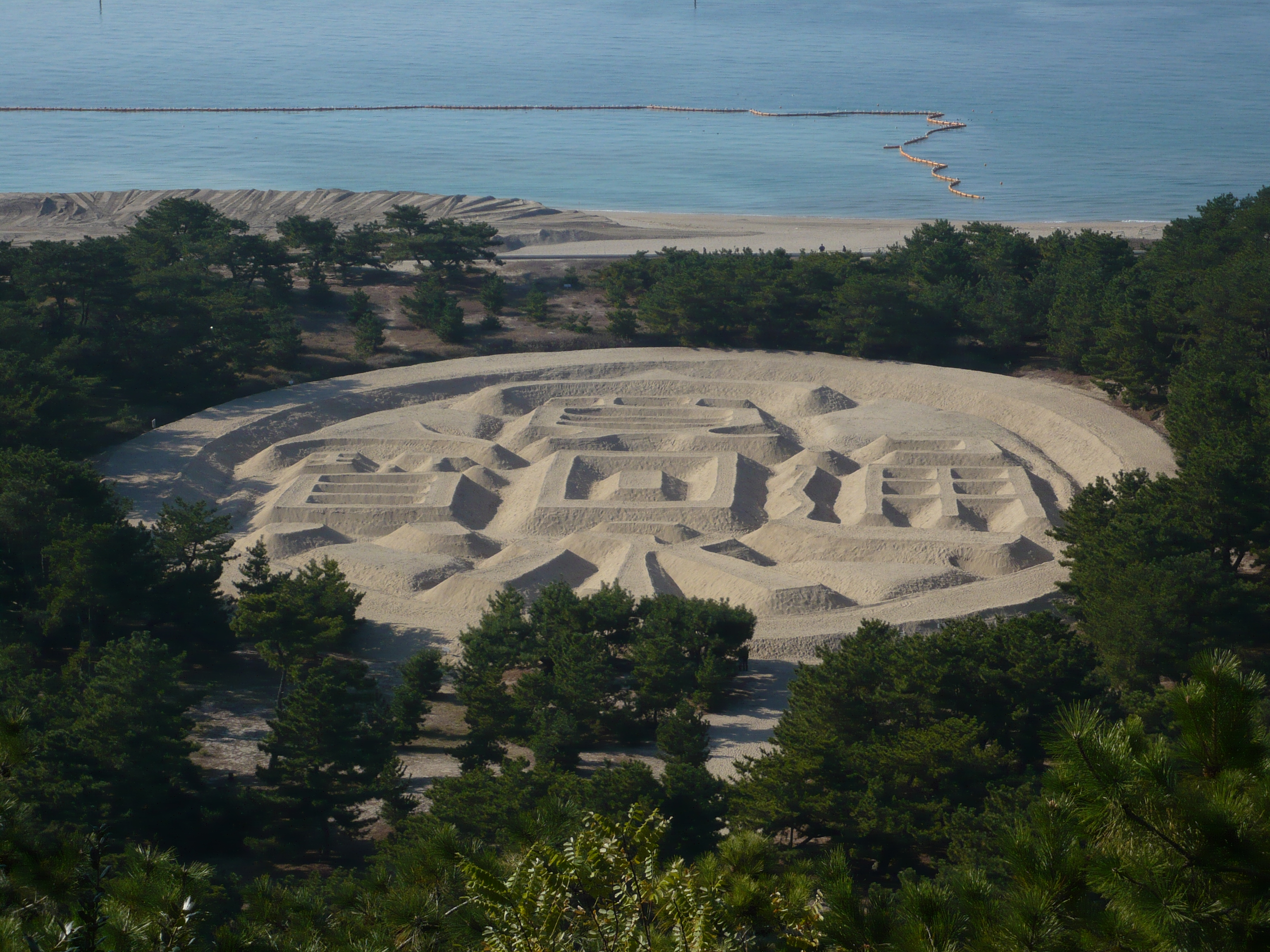
- Zenigata suna-e (origins in 1633)

- Location within Kagawa Prefecture Location within Japan
- Location: Kan'onji, Kagawa, Japan
- Area: 47 ha (120 acres)
- Established: 1897
- Governing body: Kagawa Prefecture
- National Place of Scenic Beauty

Kotohiki Park (琴弾公園, Kotohiki kōen) is a city park located in the city of Kan'onji, Kagawa Prefecture, Japan on the island of Shikoku inside Setonaikai National Park. The park is known for its Zenigata suna-e (銭形砂絵) (lit. 'coin-shaped sand-drawing'), dating in origins to 1633 when it was created by the local people to greet their new daimyō Ikoma Takatoshi; Its gardens were designed by gardener Ozawa Keijiro.

Kotohiki Park opened as a prefectural park in 1897. It was nationally designated as a Place of Scenic Beauty in 1936.

The park is near Jinne-in (神恵院) and Kannon-ji (観音寺), temples 68 and 69 of the Shikoku 88 temple pilgrimage.

== See also ==
- List of Places of Scenic Beauty of Japan (Kagawa)
- Koto
