= List of places of scenic beauty of Japan (Kagawa) =

This list is of the places of scenic beauty of Japan located within the Prefecture of Kagawa.

== National Places of Scenic Beauty ==
As of 1 January 2021, six Places have been designated at a national level (including one *Special Place of Scenic Beauty).

Site	Municipality	Comments	Image	Coordinates	Type	Ref.
*Ritsurin Garden 栗林公園; Kannonin teien	Takamatsu			34°19′47″N 134°02′40″E	1	
Kotohiki Park 琴弾公園; Kotohiki kōen	Kan'onji			34°08′01″N 133°38′37″E	1	
Mount Zōzu 象頭山; Zōzu-zan	Kotohira	also a Natural Monument		34°11′16″N 133°48′08″E	11, 3	
Mount Kankake (Kankakei) 神懸山 (寒霞渓); Kankake-yama (Kanka-kei)	Shōdoshima			34°30′49″N 134°17′56″E	5, 6, 10	
Hiunkaku Gardens 披雲閣庭園; Hiunkaku teien	Takamatsu			34°21′00″N 134°03′01″E		
Mannō Lake 満濃池; Mannō-ike	Mannō			34°09′48″N 133°52′22″E		

== Prefectural Places of Scenic Beauty ==
As of 1 May 2020, two Places have been designated at a prefectural level.

Site	Municipality	Comments	Image	Coordinates	Type	Ref.
Obika Family Tsukiyama Gardens 小比賀家築山庭園; Obika-ke Tsukiyama teien	Takamatsu			34°18′33″N 133°59′23″E		
Hōkō-ji Gardens 宝光寺庭園; Hōkōji teien	Higashikagawa			34°11′49″N 134°20′40″E		

== Municipal Places of Scenic Beauty ==
As of 1 May 2020, nine Places have been designated at a municipal level.

Site	Municipality	Comments	Image	Coordinates	Type	Ref.
Nakazu-Banshō-En 中津万象園; Nakazu-Banshō-en	Marugame			34°13′34″N 134°12′05″E		
Sanjū Falls 三重の滝; Sanjū-no-taki	Sanuki			34°13′34″N 134°12′05″E		
Kōfūen 香風園附翠松閣･時雨亭; Kōfūen tsuketari Suishōkaku ･ Jiutei	Sakaide			34°18′48″N 133°51′11″E		

== Registered Places of Scenic Beauty ==
As of 1 January 2021, one Monument has been registered (as opposed to designated) as a Place of Scenic Beauty at a national level.

Place	Municipality	Comments	Image	Coordinates	Type	Ref.
Masui Family Gardens 増井氏庭園（雲門庵露地） Masui-shi teien (Unmon-an roji)	Takamatsu			34°20′34″N 134°02′48″E		

== See also ==
- Cultural Properties of Japan
- List of Historic Sites of Japan (Kagawa)
- List of parks and gardens of Kagawa Prefecture
