= Ōnohara Kofun cluster =

Kofun period burial mound cluster in Kan'onji, Kagawa, Japan

- 大野原古墳群 (Japanese)
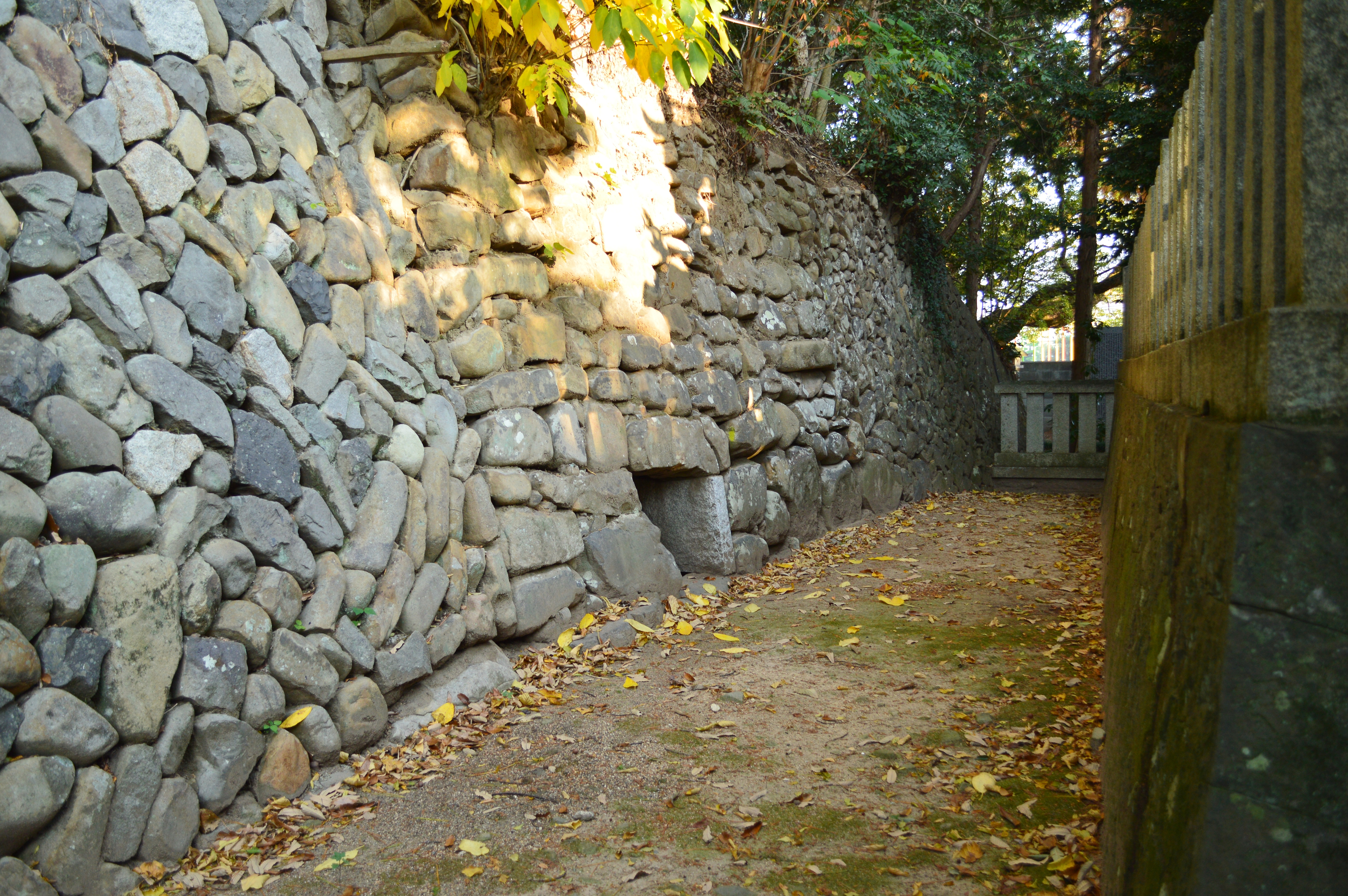
- Wankashizuka Kofun entry

- Ōnohara Kofun cluster Ōnohara Kofun cluster (Japan)
- Interactive map of Ōnohara Kofun cluster
- 34°05′16″N 133°39′48″E
- Type: Kofun
- Periods: Kofun period
- Location: Kan'onji, Kagawa, Japan
- Region: Shikoku

History
- Built: late 6th - mid-7th century AD

Site notes
- Public access: Yes

The Ōnohara Kofun cluster (大野原古墳群, Ōnohara Kofun-gun) is a group of kofun burial mounds located in the city of Kan'onji, Kagawa Prefecture, on the island of Shikoku of Japan. The tumuli were collectively designated a National Historic Site in 2015 with the area under protection expanded in 2020.

== Overview ==
The Ōnohara Kofun cluster is located in the western part of Kagawa Prefecture, in the center of an alluvial fan formed by the Kushita River, overlooking the Seto Inland Sea. The site once consisted of over 170 tumuli, but most have been destroyed through urban encroachment and farmland improvement, and only the four largest tumuli have survived under National Historic Site protection. Archaeological excavations have been carried out since 2006. The Wankashizuka Kofun, Hirazuka Kofun and Iwakurazuka Kofun are large circular burial mounds (empun (円墳)), whereas the Kakuzuka Kofun is a large rectangular burial mound (hōfun (方墳)). All have large stone burial chambers measuring 10 or more meters in length. In particular, the Wankashizuka Kofun has a total length of 14.8 meters and floor area of 24.6 square meters, or 72.7 cubic meters, making it the largest in Shikoku. From artifacts and grave goods recovered, these tumuli are presumed to have been constructed from the late Kofun period from the end of the 6th century to the early 7th century. In the Shikoku region, there are many examples of individual tumuli of a class similar to the ones in this group, but the Ōnohara Kofun cluster is unique in that several large tumuli were built in a group over three generations for about 50 years.

The Wankashizuka Kofun is located behind the main hall of Onohara Hachiman Shrine. The tumulus is circular, measuring 37.2 meters in diameter and 9.5 meters in height, and was surrounded by a double moat, with a small embankment in between the moats. The burial chamber is a multi-room structure, consisting of a ear chamber, an antechamber, and a passageway, and opens to the southwest. It has a total length of 14.8 meters, with the rear chamber measuring 6.8 meters long, 3.6 meters widest, currently 3.9 meters high. Among the excavated items are pieces of Sue ware pottery and fragments of a wooden coffin. These artifacts date the tumulus to the end of the 6th century.

The Hirazuka Kofun has a chapel of the Onohara Hachiman Shrine on its summit. The tumulus is circular, and with a diameter of 50.2 meters is the largest tumulus in Kagawa Prefecture. It is surrounded by an 8.4-meter wide moat. The burial chamber opens in the south-southwest direction and is a single-room structure with a total length of 13.2 meters. The rear chamber is 6.5 meters long, 3 meters wide at maximum, and 2.6 meters high and was found to contain Sure ware Haji ware and other items which date it to the beginning of the 7th century.

The Kakuzuka Kofun is a square tumulus located adjacent to Onohara Central Park. It measures 41.7 x 37.8 meters, making it then largest square tumuli in Kagawa Prefecture. It was surrounded by a moat with a width of approximately 3.3 meters. The burial chamber opened to the south-southeast and has a length of 12.5 meters, with an inner chamber measuring 4.7 meters long, 2.6 meters widest, and 2.4 meters high. The stone used was mostly granite. Inside, fragments of Sue ware pottery were found, which were dated to around the first half of the 7th century.

The Iwakurazuka Kofun is located in the precincts of Onohara Hachiman Shrine, close to the Wankarizuka Tumulus, and excavations revealed that it was built over a portion of the outer moat of that tumulus. The Iwakurazuka Kofun is elliptical, with a major axis of 38.2 meters and minor axis of 36.4 meters and contained two burial chambers, both orientated to the east. Only the west chamber retains its stone walls. During excavation, late quantities of flat stones with single-character Buddhist votive inscriptions dating from the Edo Period were discovered.

The site is open to the public as an archaeological park, but the interior of the burial chambers are not accessible.

Ōnohara Kofun cluster
Name	Location	Type	Size	Date
Wankashizuka Kofun (椀貸塚古墳)	34°5′15.75″N 133°39′47.65″E	circular	diameter 37.2m dia x 9.5m high; burial chamber: 14.8m	late 6th C
Hirazuka Kofun (平塚古墳)	34°5′1.08″N 133°39′34.8″E	circular	dia 50.2 m dia x 7m high	early 7th C
Kakuzuka Kofun (角塚古墳)	34°5′5.85″N 133°39′38.3″E	square	41.7m x 37.8m x 9 m high	early 7th C
Iwakurazuka Kofun (岩倉塚古墳)	34°5′16.18″N 133°39′48.87″E	circular	36.4-38.2m dia	late 6th C

== Gallery ==
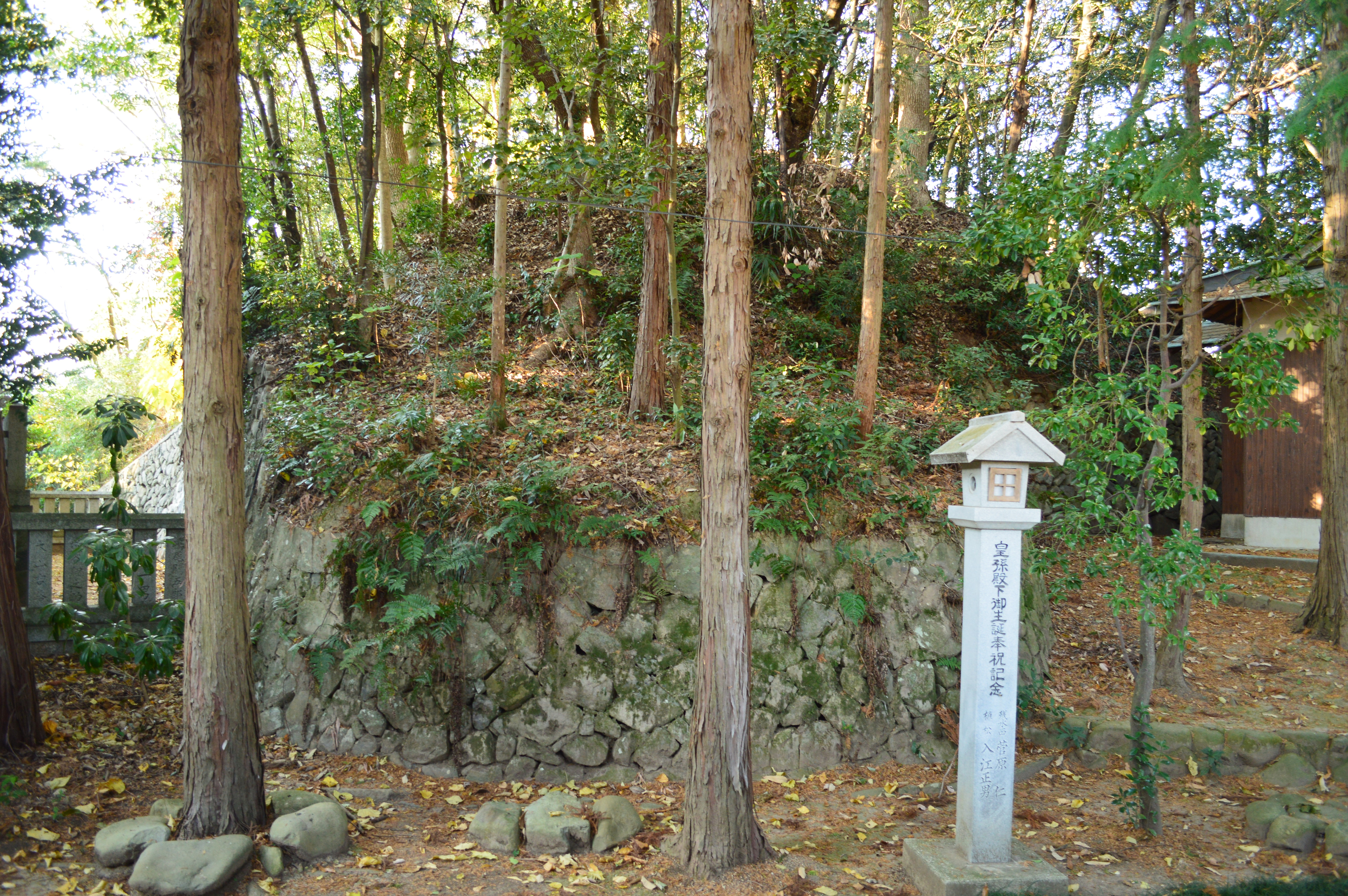
Wankashizuka Kofun

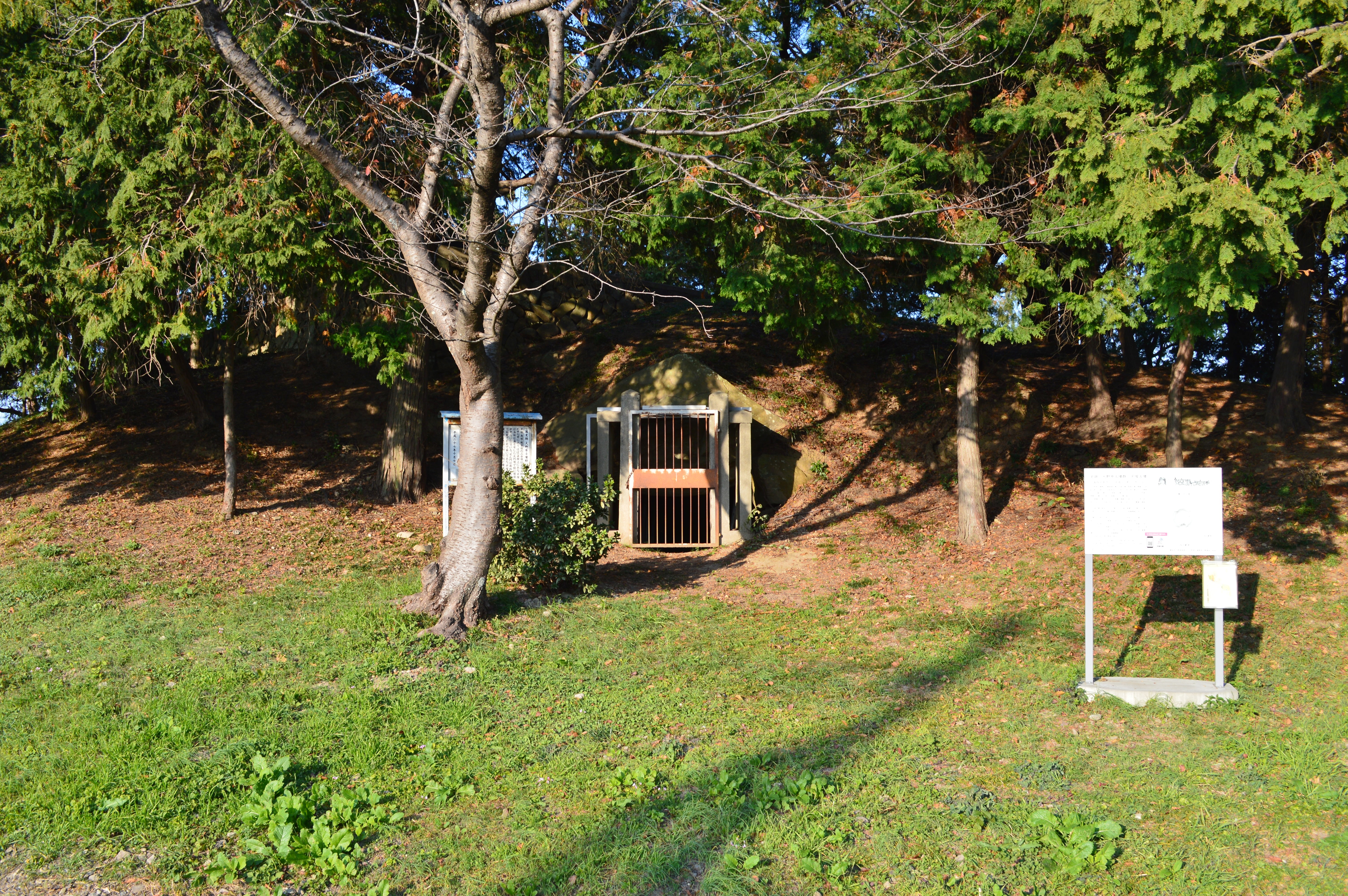
Hirazuka Kofun

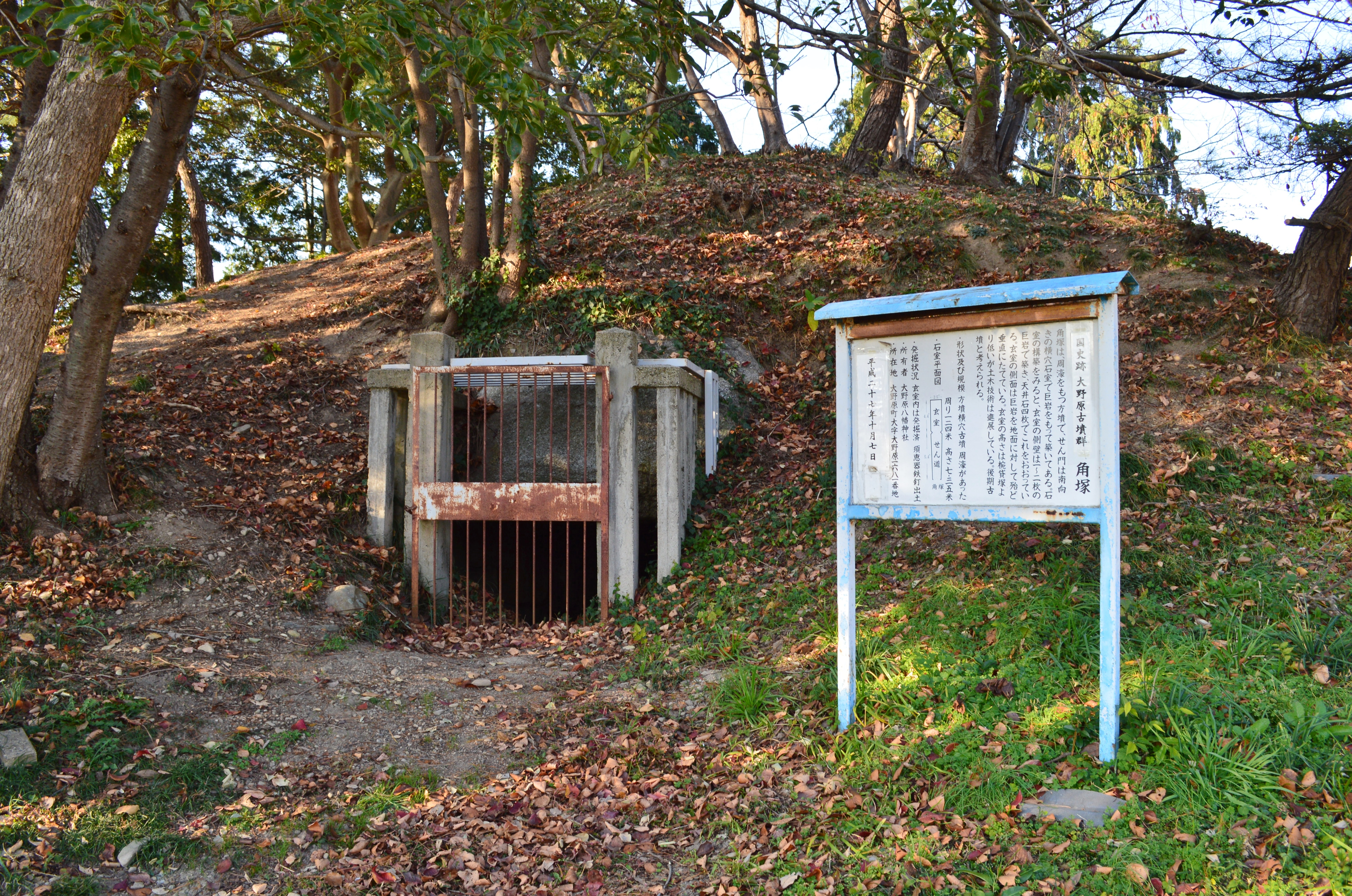
Kakuzuka Kofun

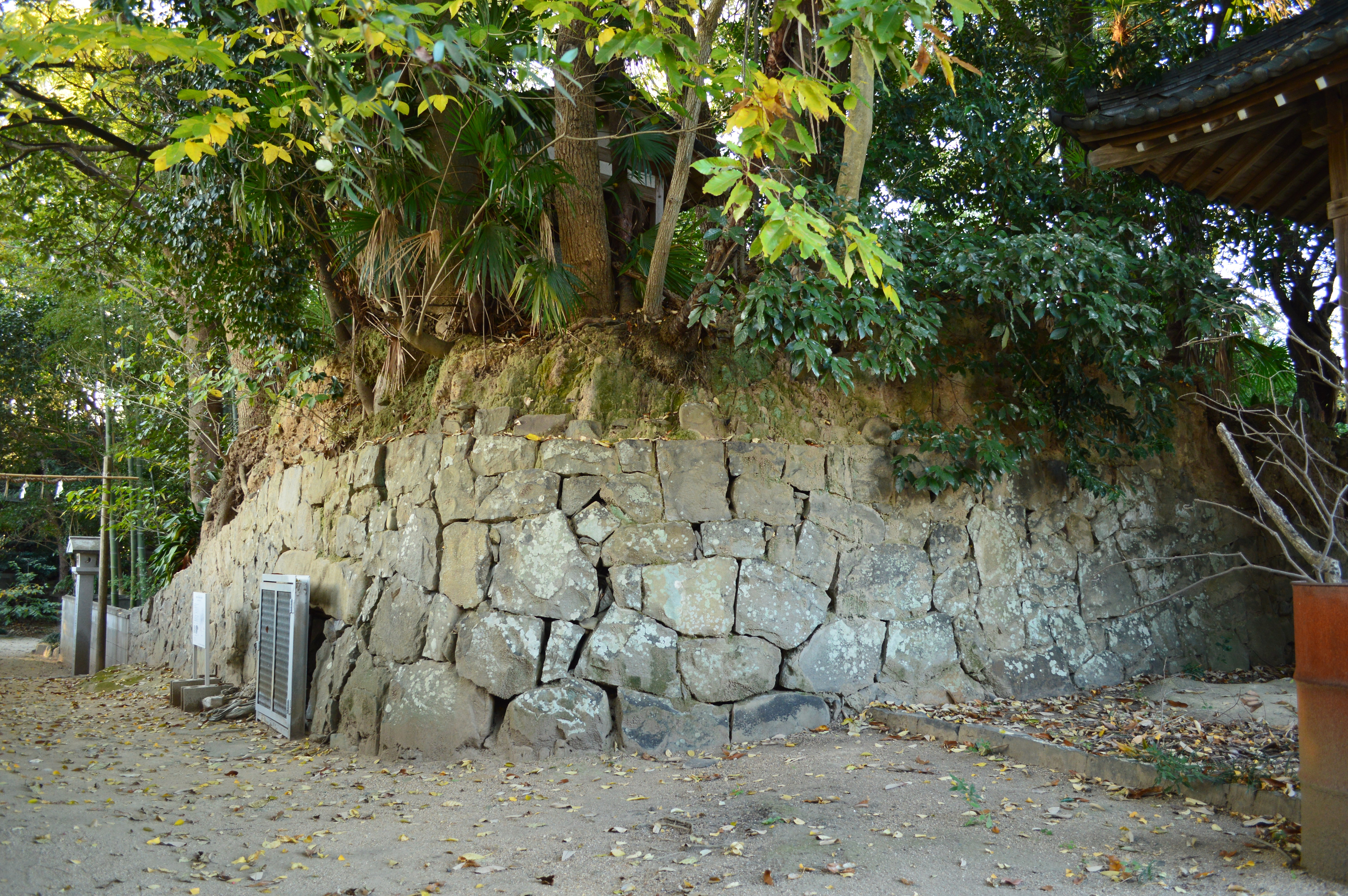
Iwakurazuka Kofun

== See also ==
- List of Historic Sites of Japan (Kagawa)
