= Kannon-ji =

Kannon-ji may refer to:

- Kannon-ji (Tokushima)
- Imakumano Kannon-ji
- Ohashi Kannon-ji
