= Manno Lake =

Reservoir in Japan

- 満濃池 (Japanese)
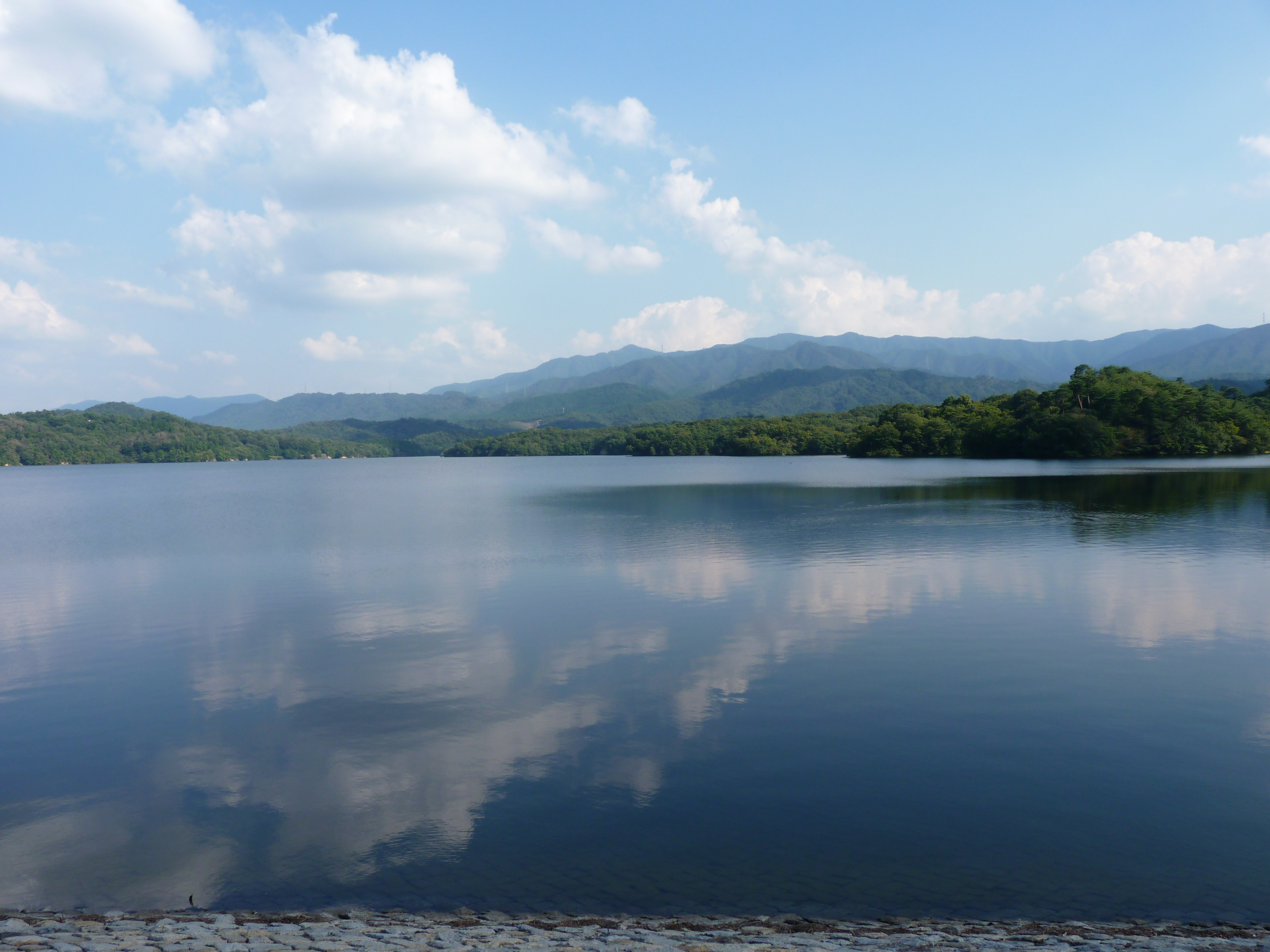
- Manno Lake

- Location within Kagawa Prefecture
- Location: Manno, Kagawa
- Coordinates: 34.162°N 133.874°E
- Primary inflows: Doki River, Kanakura River
- Basin countries: Japan
- Surface area: 1.385 km^{2} (0.535 sq mi)
- Max. depth: 30.14 m (98.9 ft)
- Water volume: 0.0154 km^{3} (12,500 acre⋅ft)
- National Place of Scenic Beauty

Mannō Lake (満濃池, Mannō Ike) is a man-made irrigation reservoir with a reserve capacity of 15.4 million tons, located in the town of Mannō, Kagawa, Japan, on the island of Shikoku. It is vaguely shaped like a human hand. Around the lake is a forest of Japanese red pine, sawtooth oak, and konara oak, and 75 species of birds, including goshawks and sparrowhawks, as well as 12 species of wild animals, including Japanese squirrels. Due to the importance of the habitat, Kagawa Prefecture has designated 321 hectares as a wildlife sanctuary.

== History ==
701-704 (Taihō era)
Michimori Ason, the lord of Sanuki Province, erects the first dam. It was originally called Kaminoike because it was located in Kaminogo, but in the early Heian period, when Emperor Saga ascended the throne, it was changed to Manoike because prior to ascending the throne the emperor's name was Imperial Prince Kamino.
818 (Kōnin era, year 9)
Mannō Pond dam ruptures due to flooding.
821 (Kōnin era, year 12)
Kukai is dispatched to oversee renovations of Mannō Pond dam, with construction being completed in approximately three months. Between the years of 821 and 1184, the Manno Pond dam collapses and is subsequently restored many times.
1184 (Genryaku era, year 1)
After the collapse of the dam in 1184, all rebuilding efforts were abandoned until 1628 (Kan’ei, year 5). During this period, people settled in the basin constructing houses and cultivating fields. The settlement was named Ikeato Mura (After-Pond village).
1628 (Kan’ei era, year 5)
By order of Takamatsu Domain daimyō Ikoma Takatoshi, the fushin-bugyō Nichijima Hachibe’e begins renovations of the Mannō Pond dam.
1631 (Kan’ei era, year 8)
Takamatsu Domain completes renovations of the dam.
1854 (Ansei era, year 1)
Dam collapses due to earthquake.
1870 (Meiji era, year 3)
Restoration of dam completed. After the restorations, the three separate constructions of the Tenkawa headrace began, in order to supplement water intake from the Dokigawa, resulting in an increase of water volume three times.
1996 (Heisei era, year 8)
Mannō Pond selected as one of the 100 Soundscapes of Japan by the Ministry of the Environment.
2000 (Heisei era, year 12)
Mannō Pond Conduit Gates (満濃池樋門, Mannō-Ike Himon) registered as Japanese cultural landmark (buildings).
2005 (Heisei era, year 17)
Mannō Pond dam receives the Dammed Lake Hyakusen certification from the Dam Watershed Environmental Improvement Center.
2010 (Heisei era, year 22)
Mannō Pond receives the Pond Hyakusen certification from the Japanese Ministry of Agriculture, Forestry, and Fisheries.
2018 (Heisei era, year 30)
Mannō Pond designed a nationally designated Place of Scenic Beauty,

== Data ==
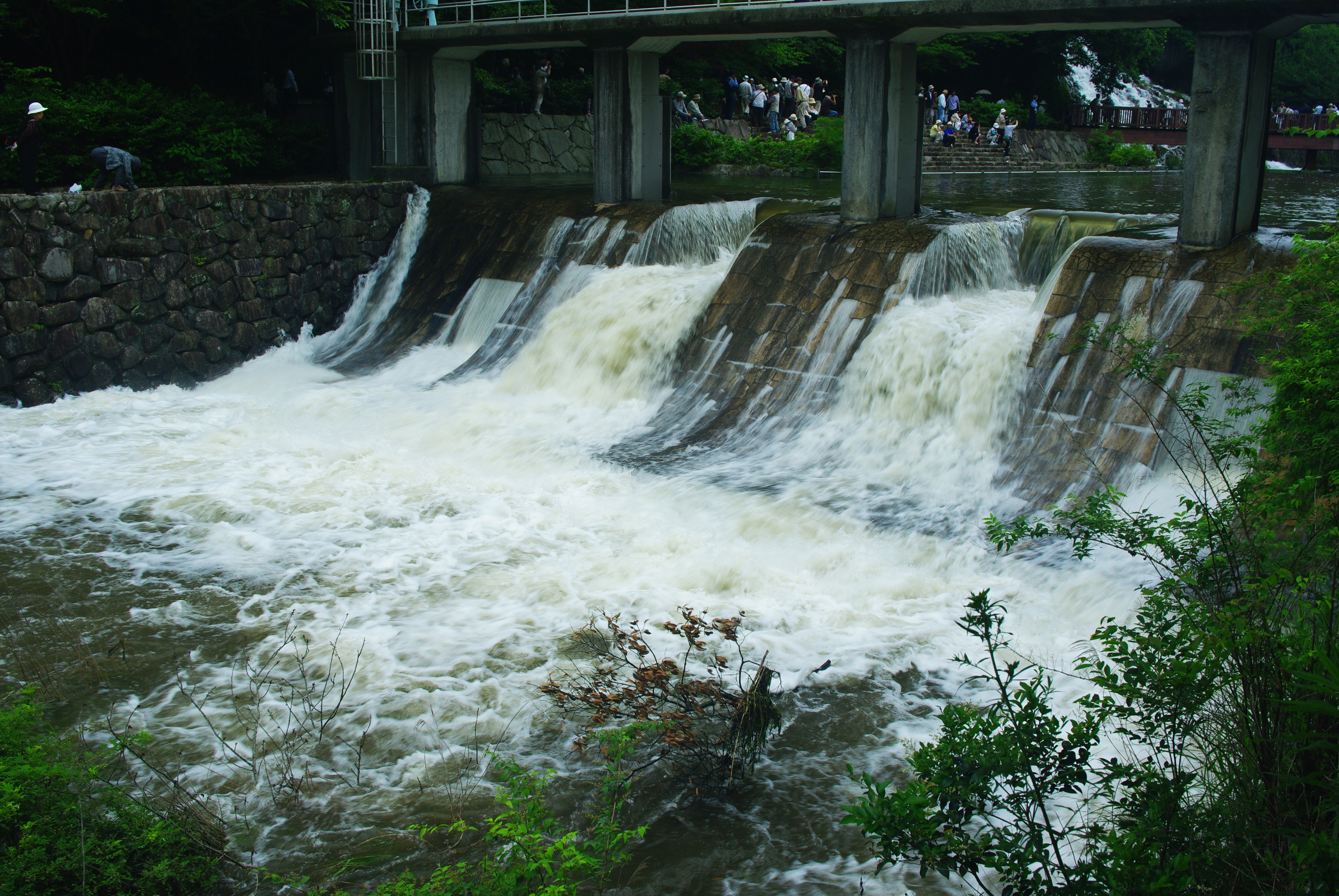

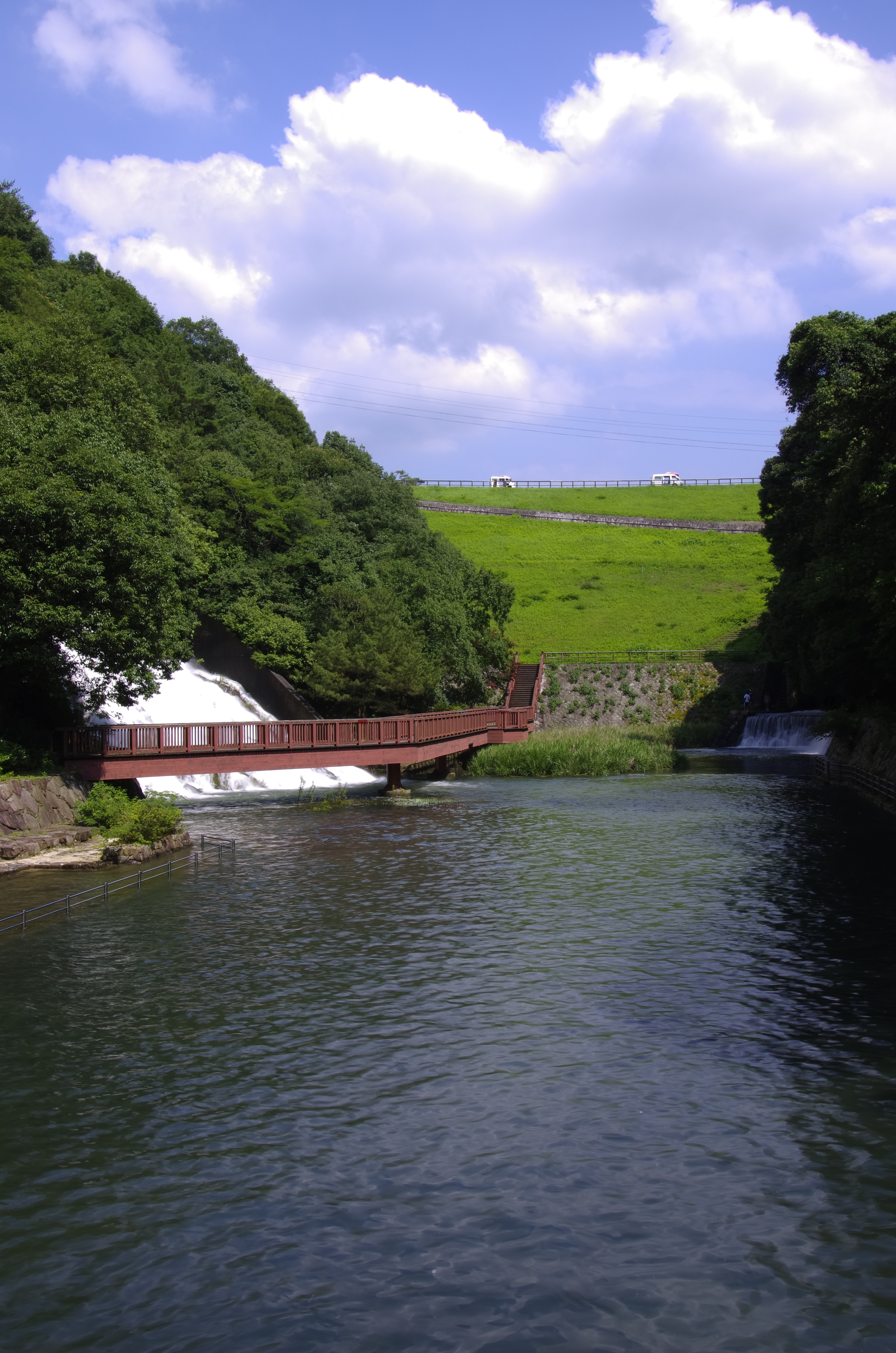

Current data
- Dam type: Earth-filled storage dam
- Dam height: 32.0m
- Dam length: 155.8m
- Shore length: 19.7km
- Water volume: 15,400,000 cubic meters
- Waterbody surface area: 342.2 acres
- Basin surface area: 348.9 acres
- Catchment area: 8004 acres
- Tributaries: Kanakura River, Doki River (via the Tenkawa Headrace)

Data from 821 (Konin era, year 12)
- Dam height: 22m
- Shore length: 10.58km
- Waterbody surface area: 200acres
- Water volume: 5,000,000 cubic meters
- Tributaries: Kanakura river

Data from 1631 (Kan’ei era, year 8)
- Dam height: 22.72m
- Dam length: 81.81m
- Shore length: 8.2km
- Regions supplied with water: 128.704 square kilometers between Naka-Gun, Uta-Gun, and Tado-Gun
- Tributaries: Kanakura river

Data from various embankment constructions
- First embankment construction water volume: 6,678,000 cubic meters
- Second embankment construction water volume: 7,800,000 cubic meters
- Third embankment construction water volume: 15,400,000 cubic meters

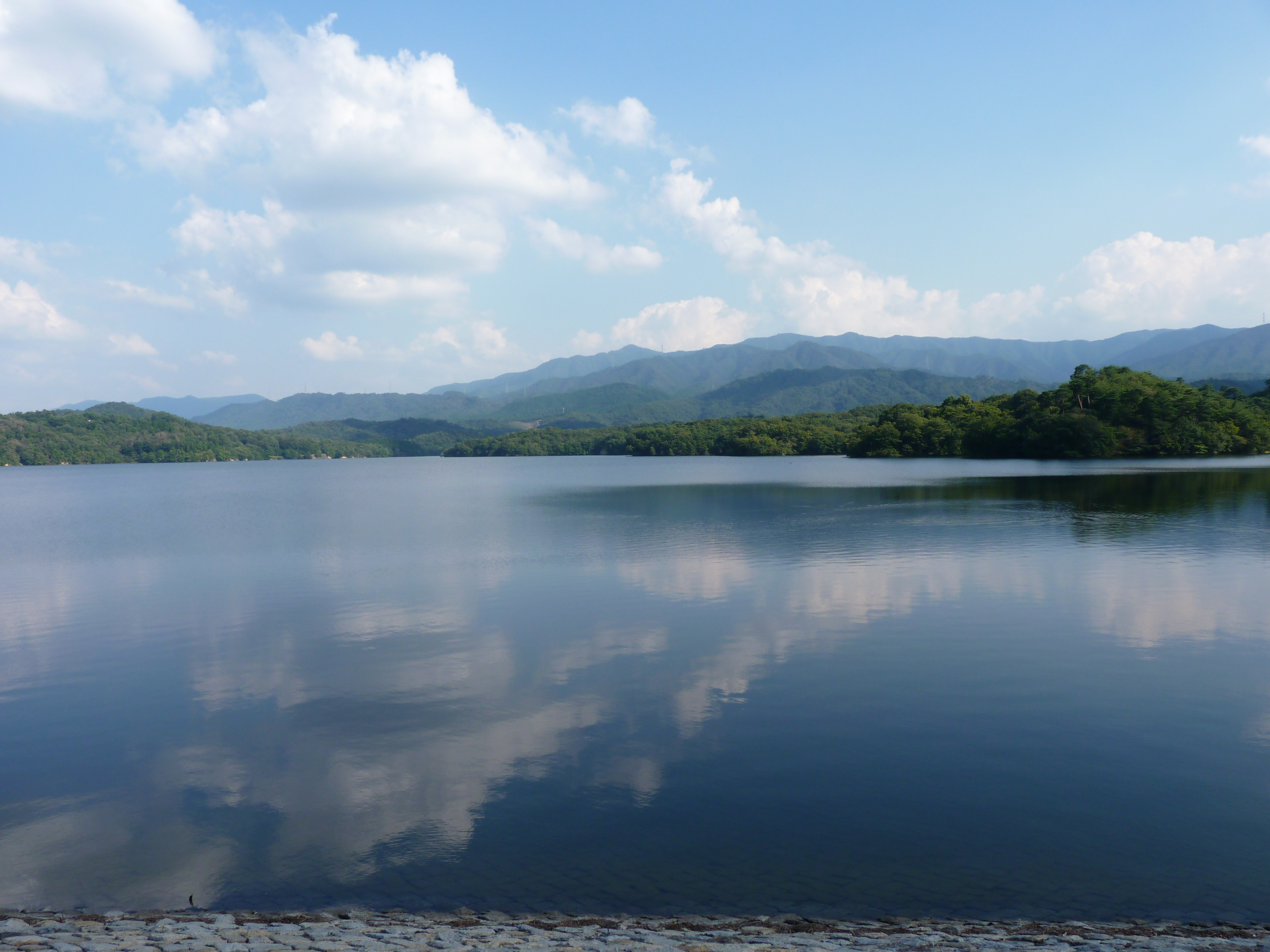

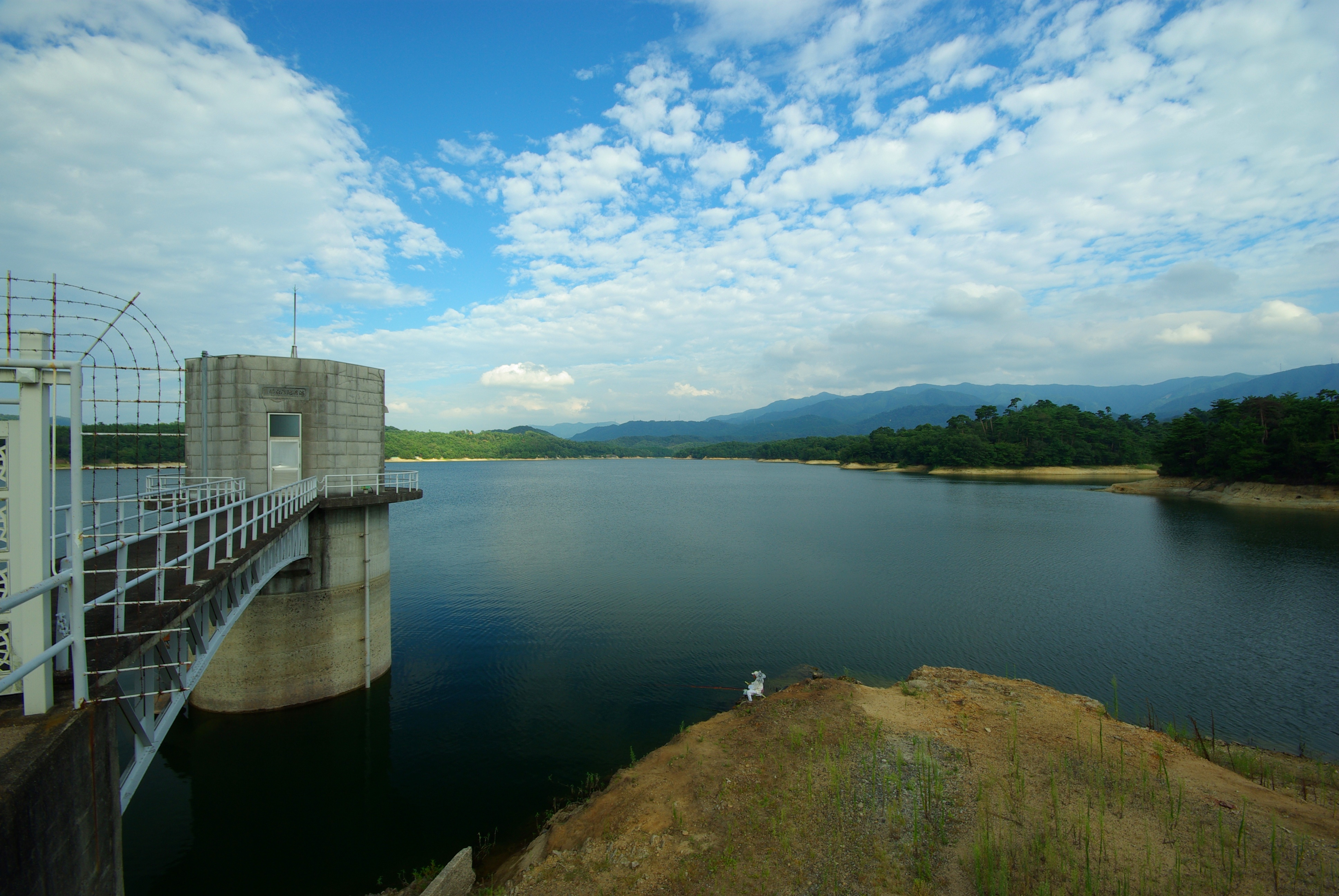

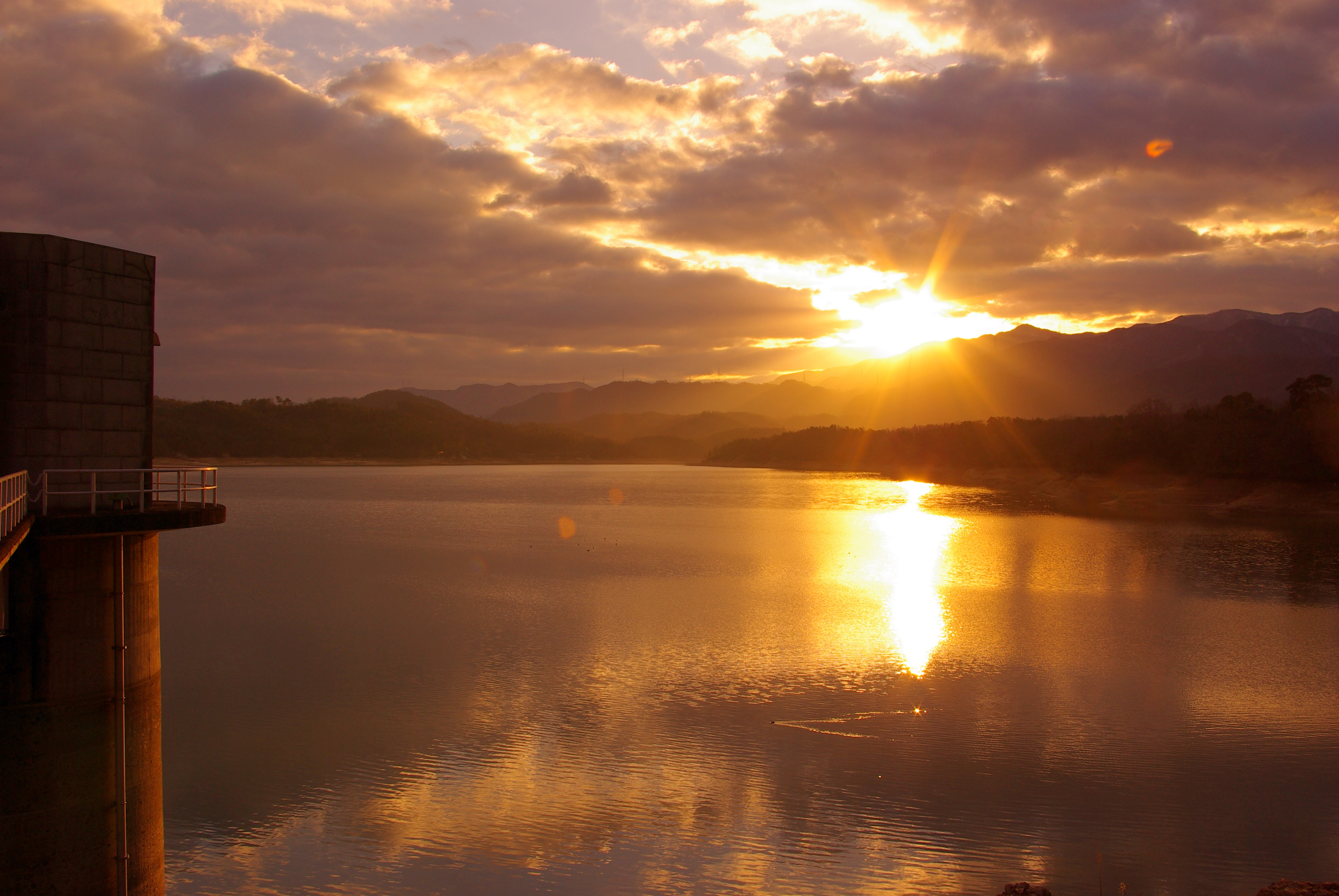

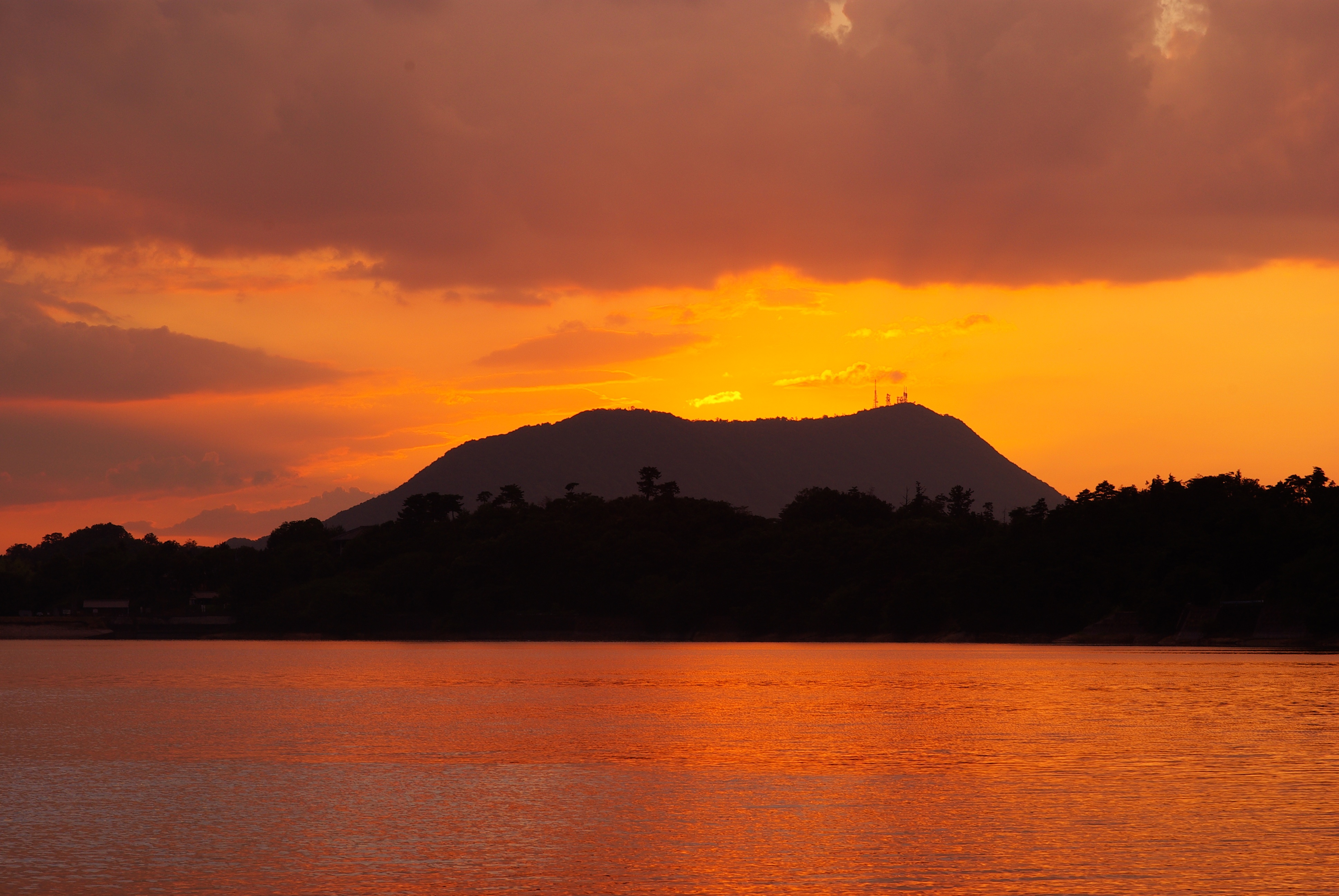

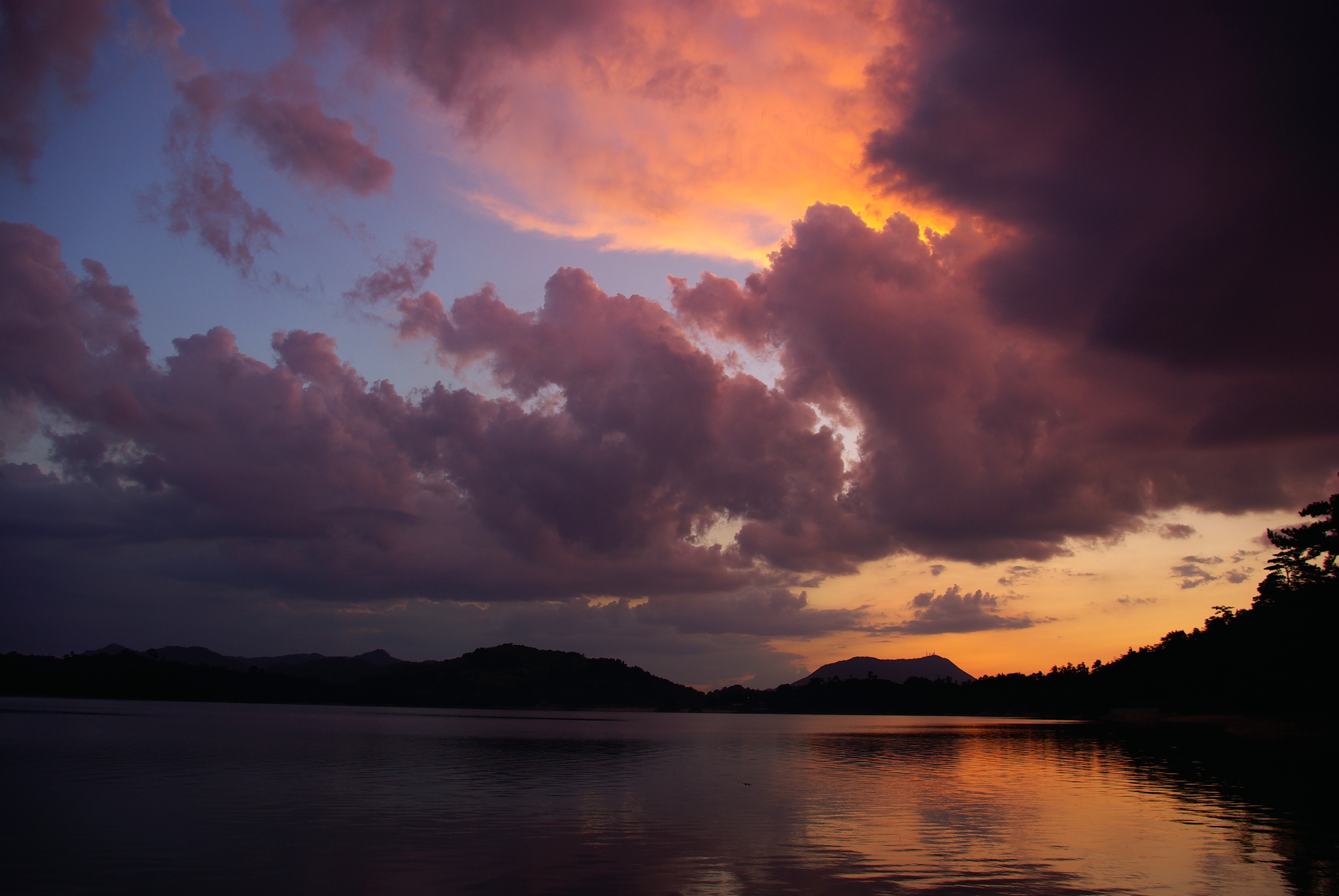

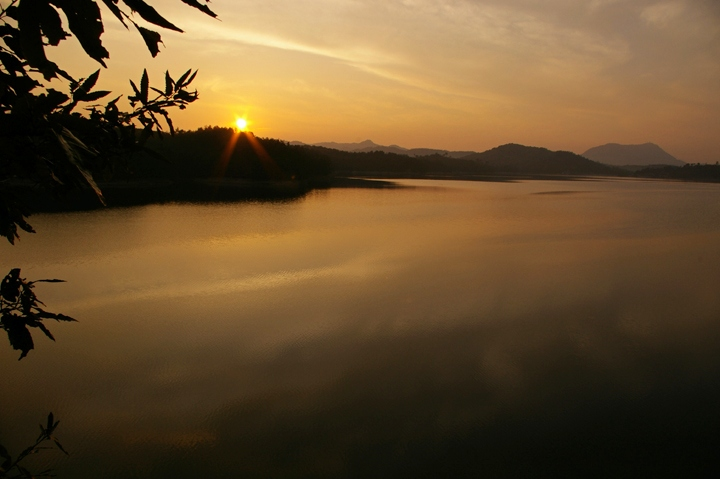

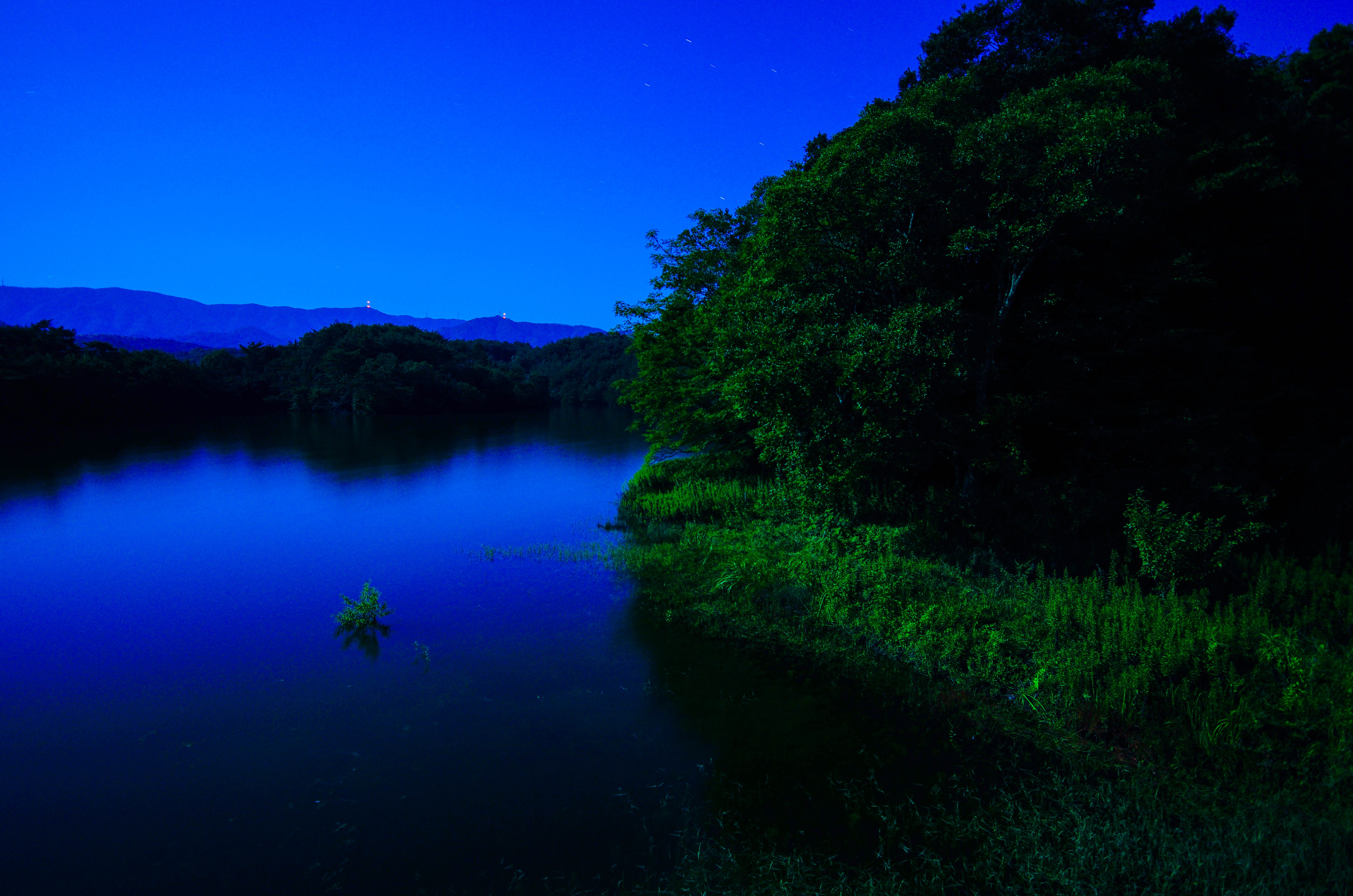

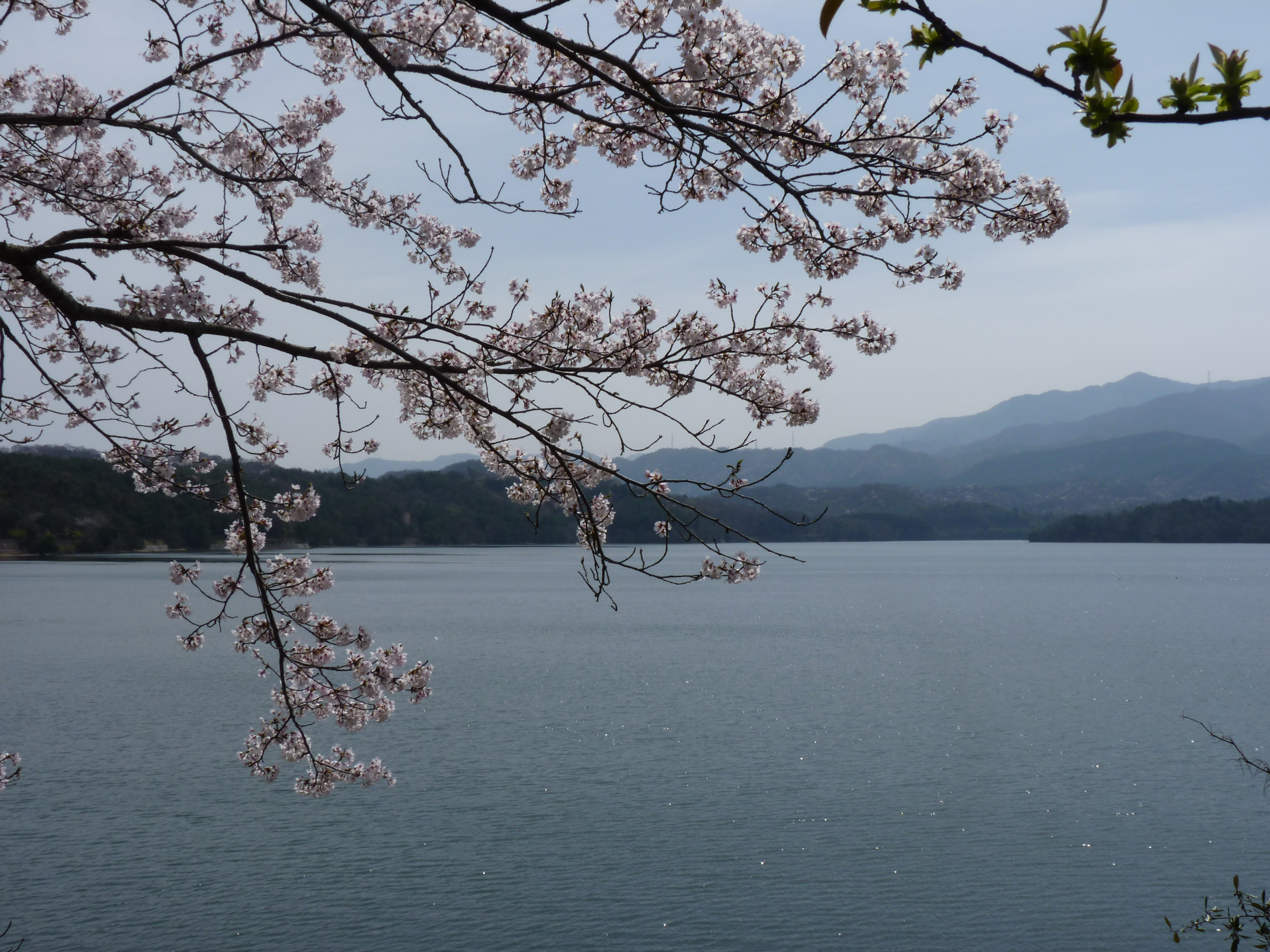

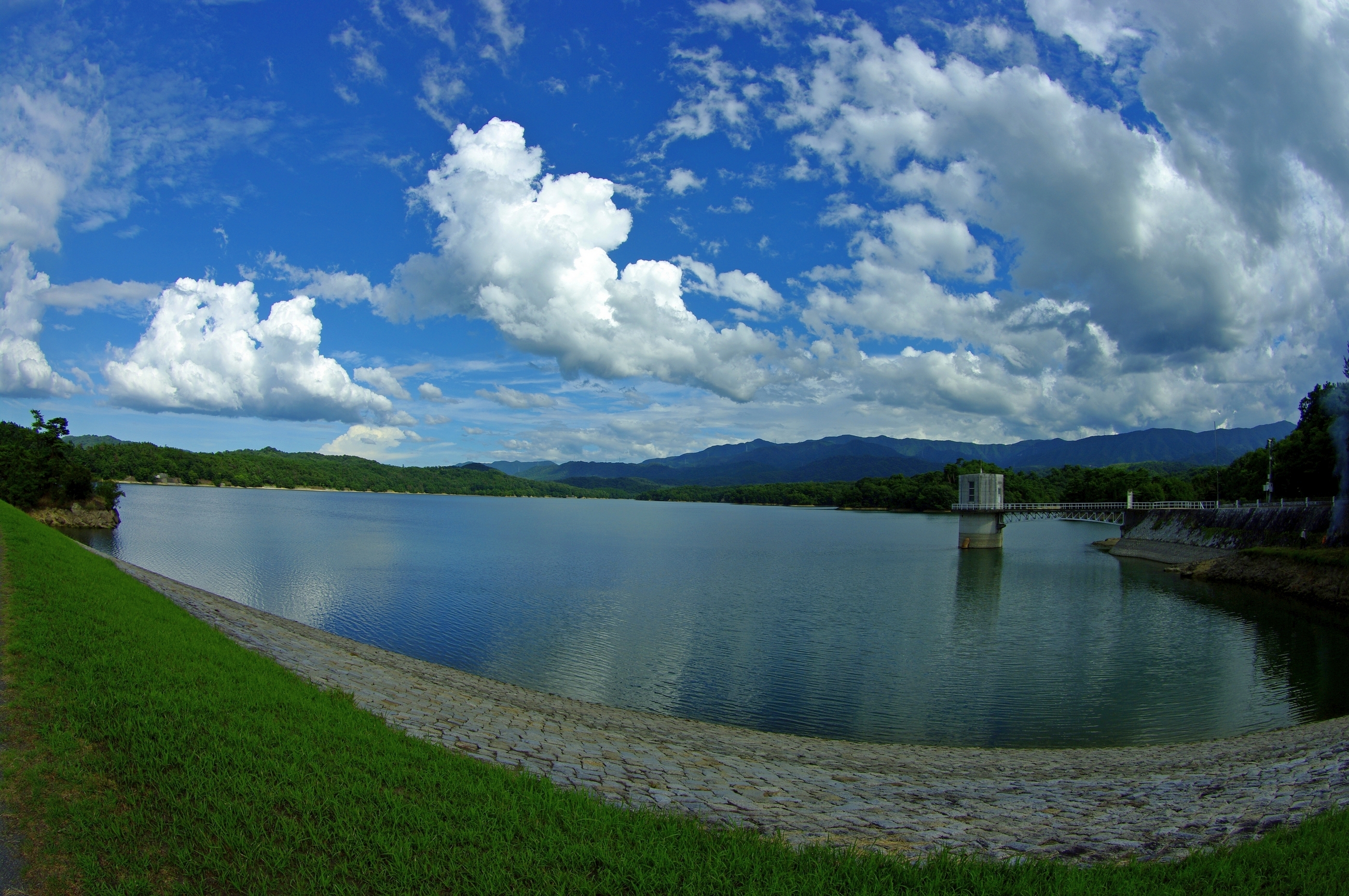

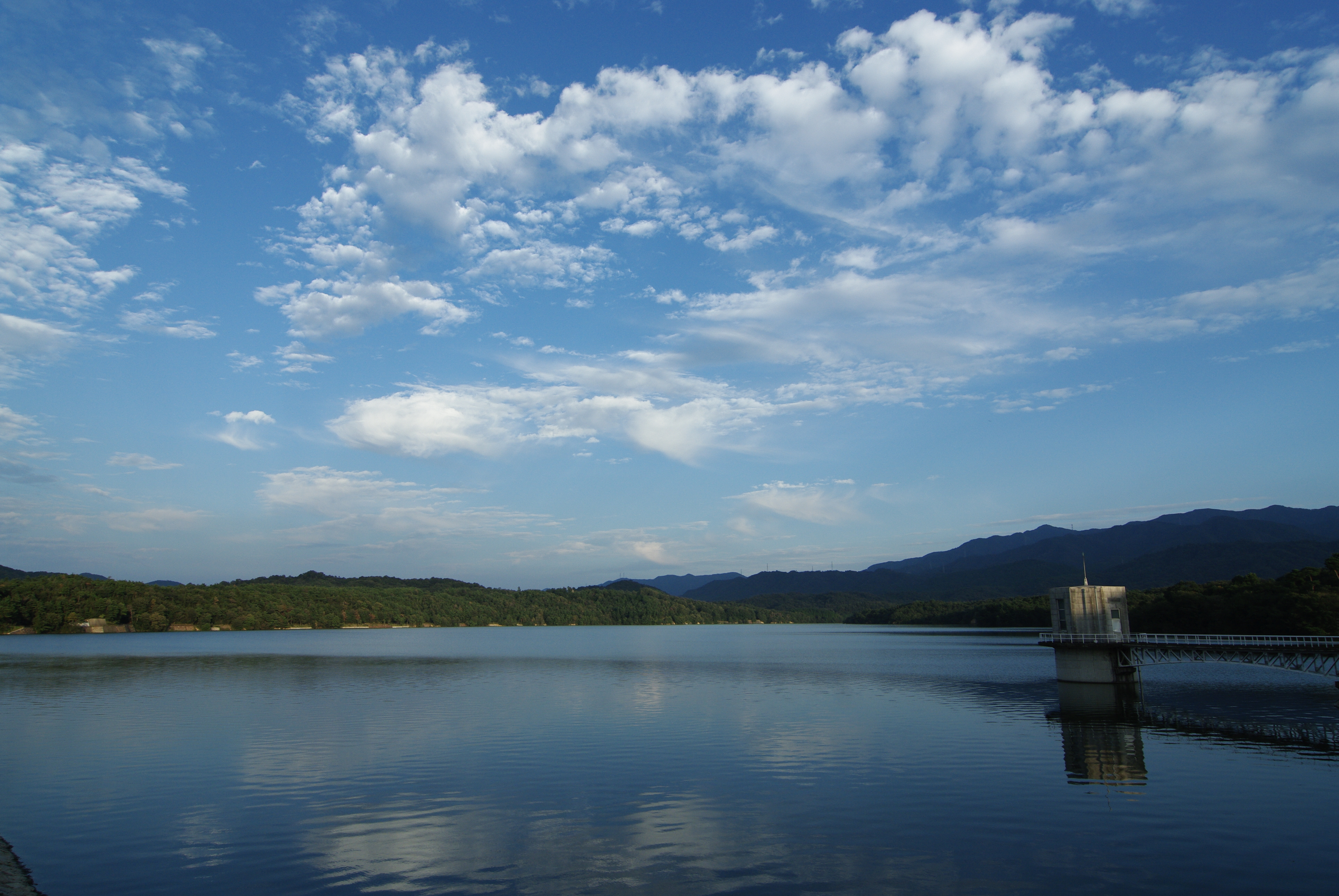

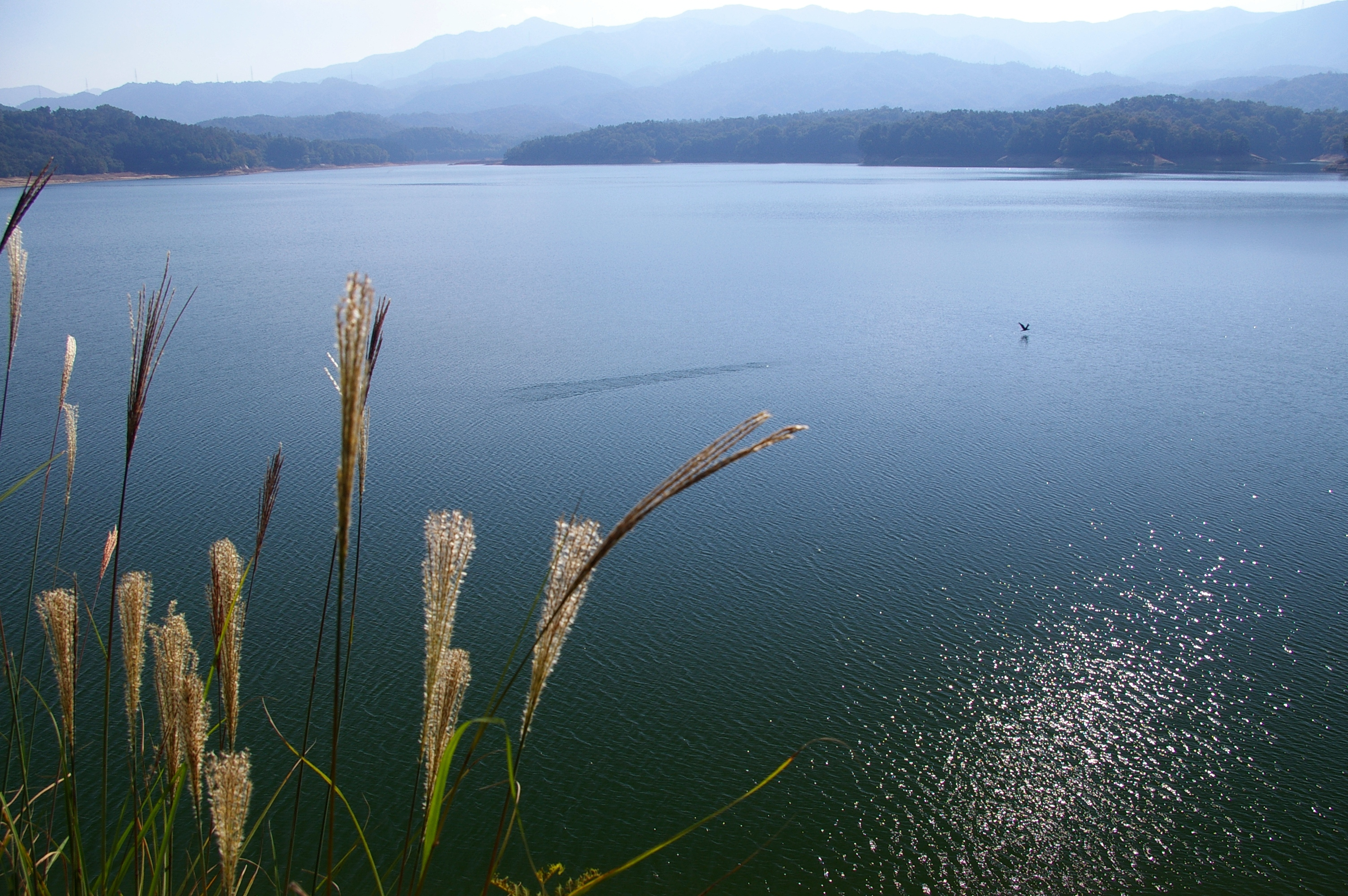

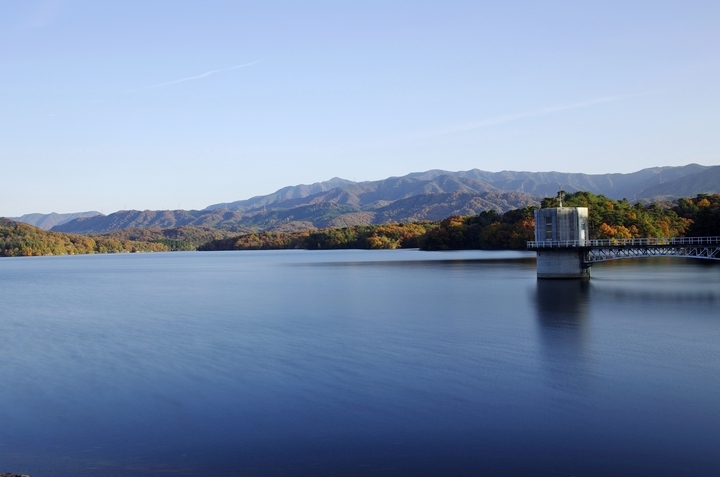

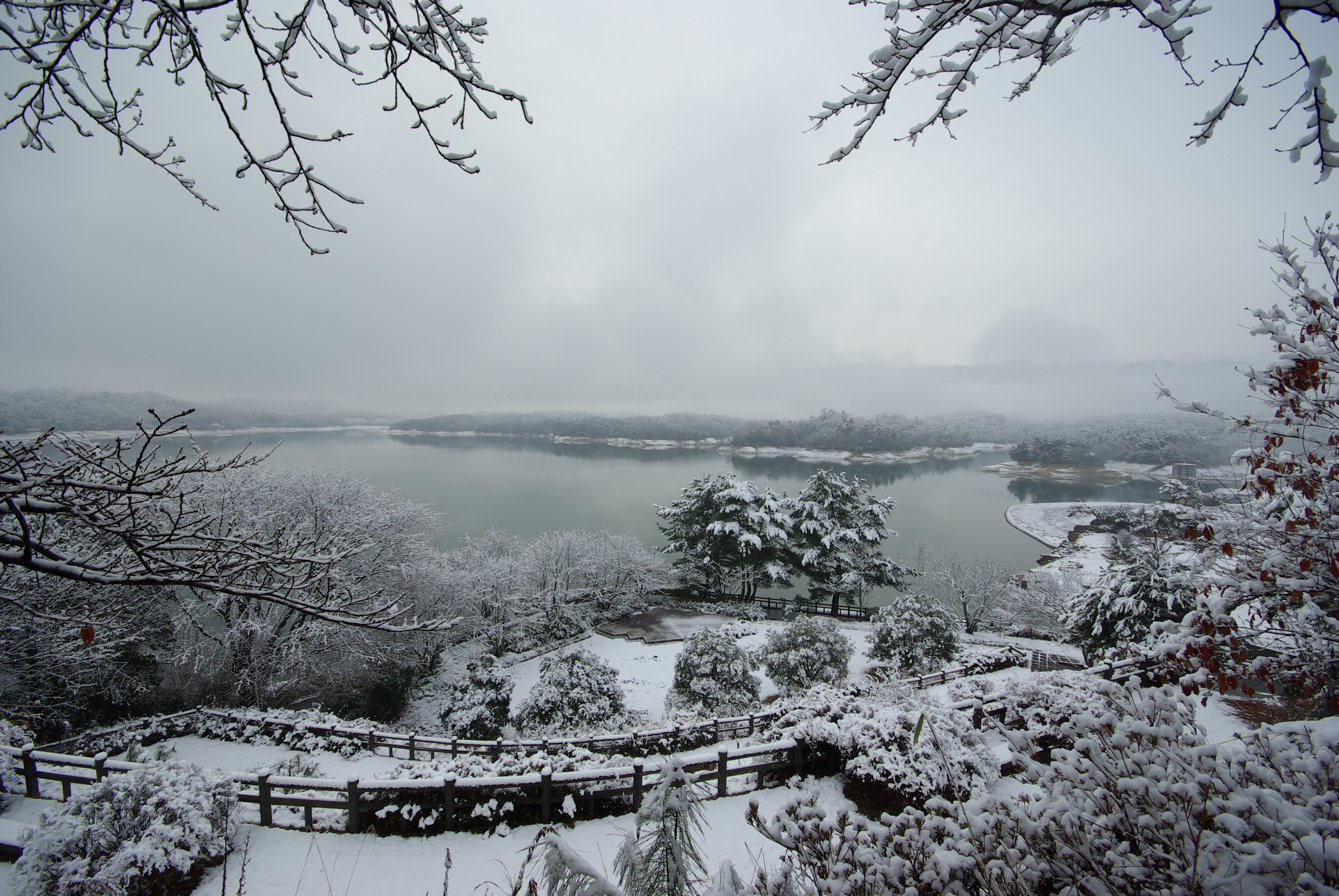

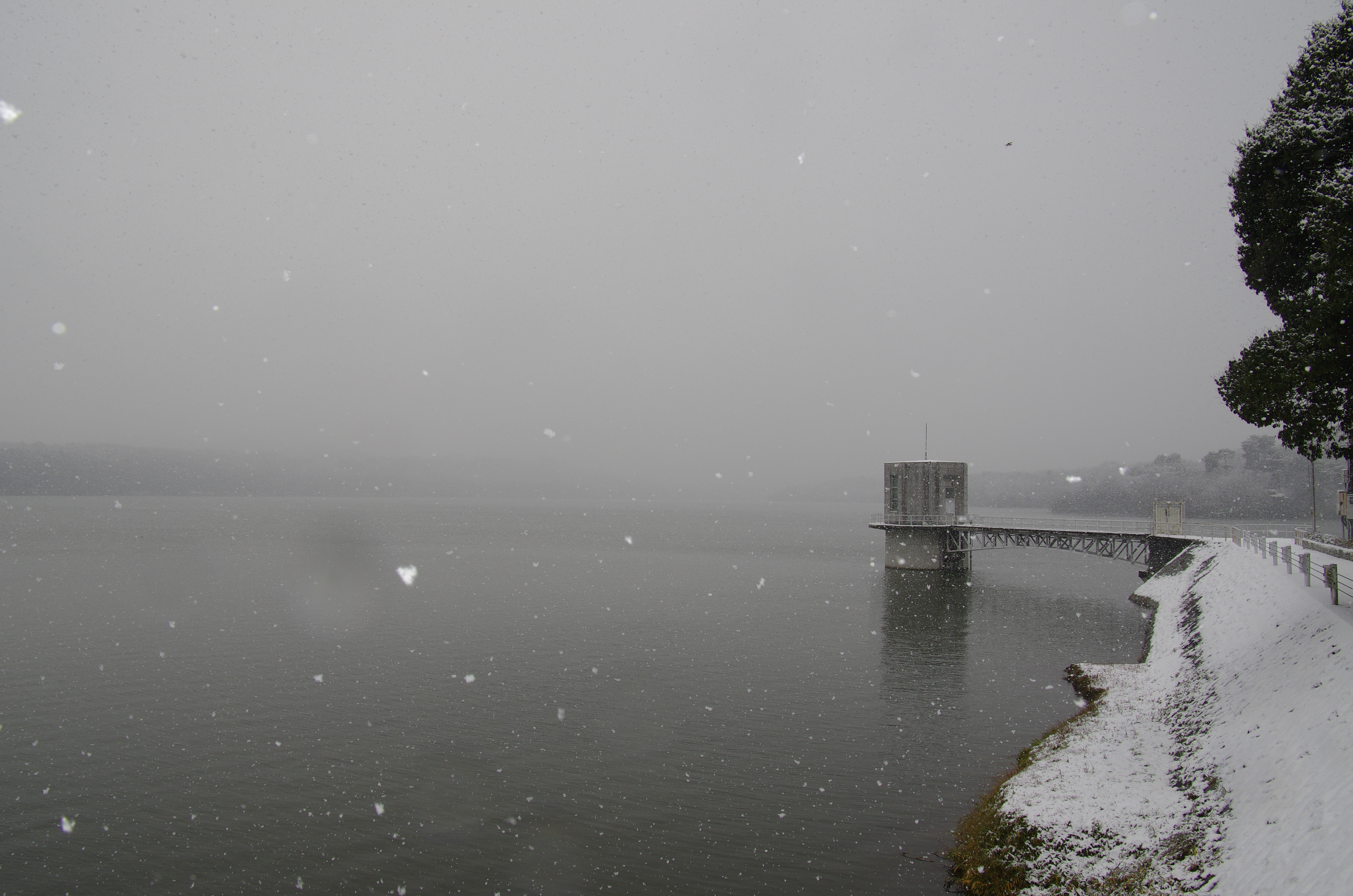

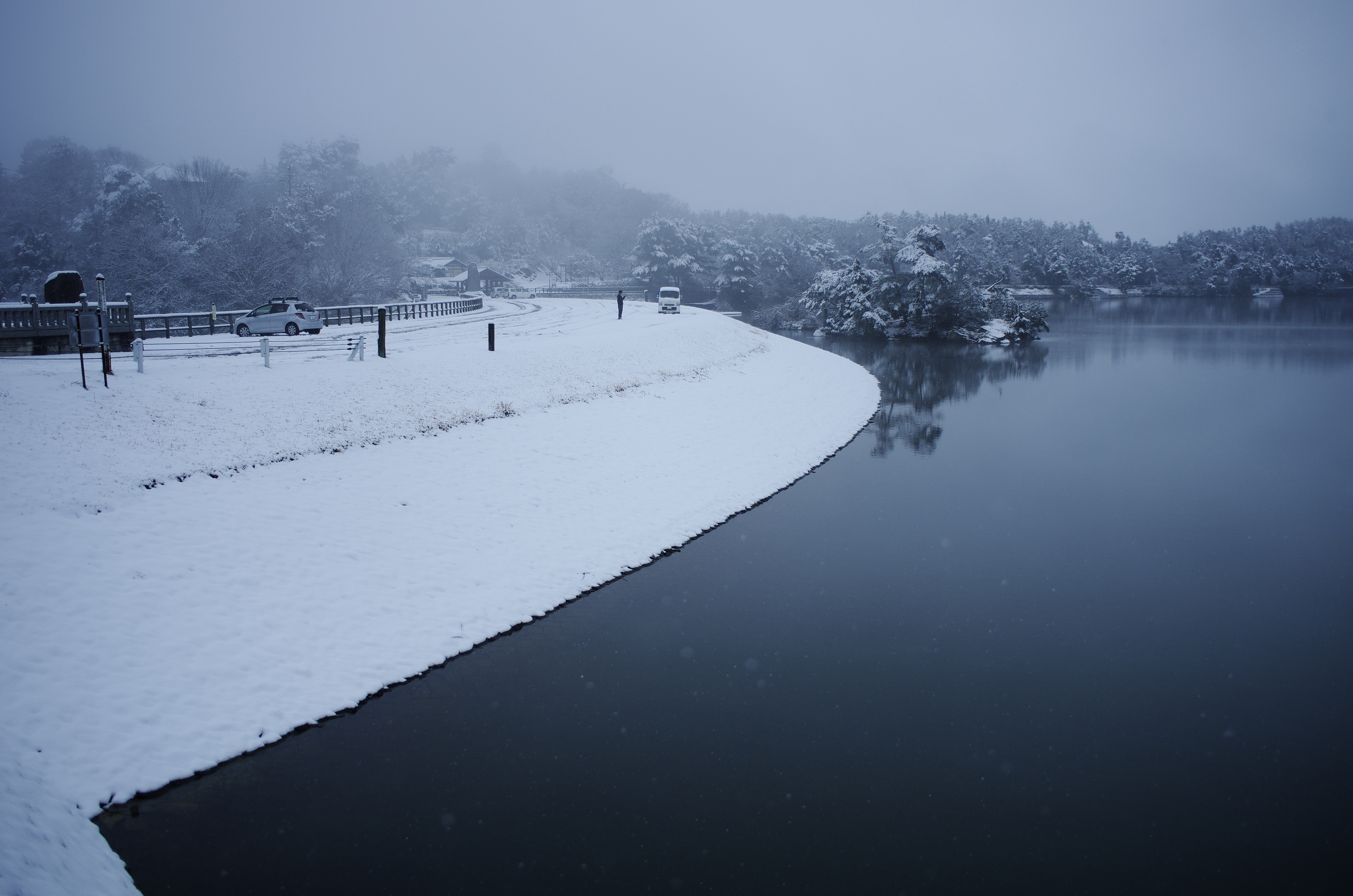

== Yuru-Nuki ==
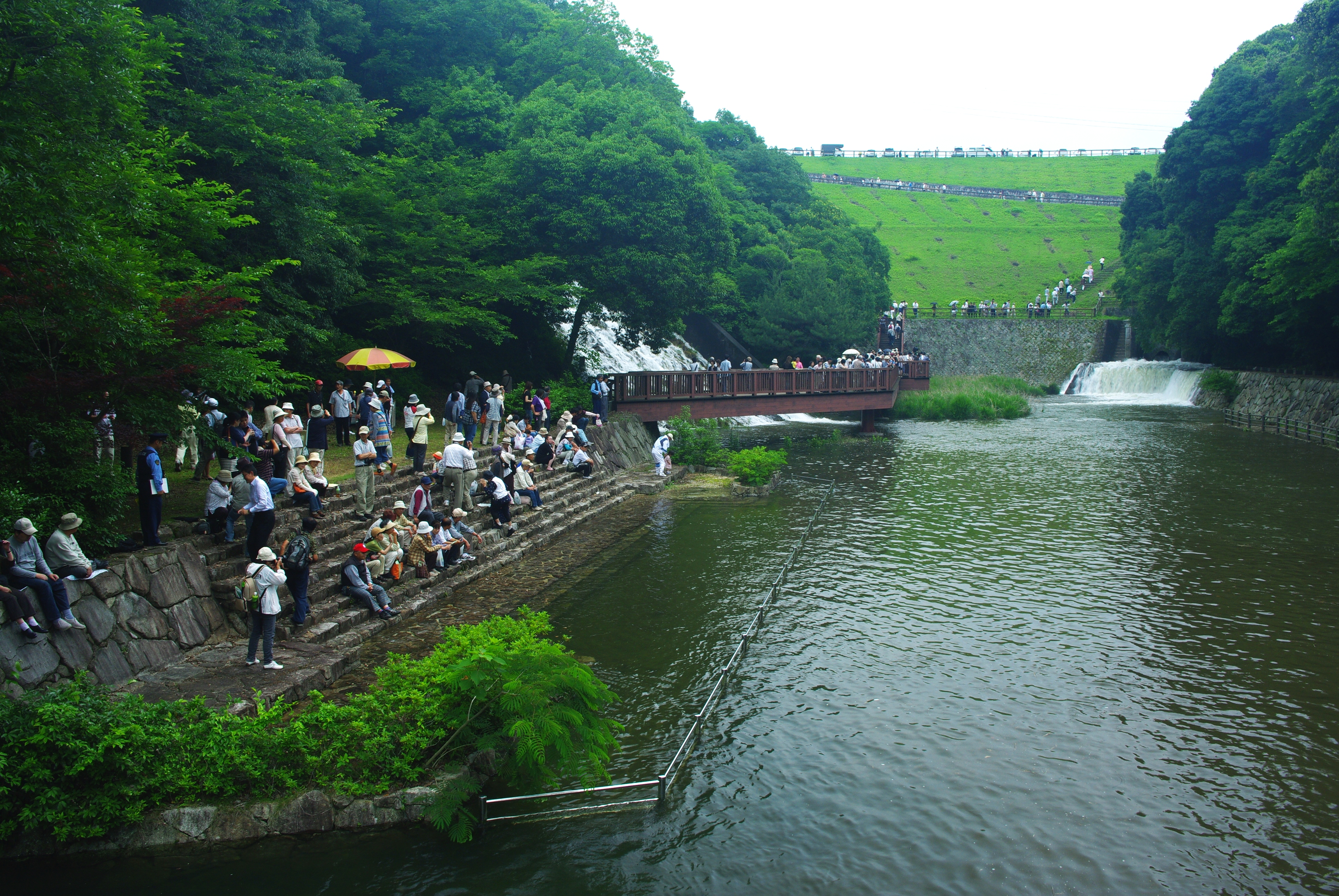

A "Yuru" is a water reservoir plug. The Yuru-Nuki ceremony, which is held on annually on June 15 at Manno Pond, releases water to irrigate fields for the rice-planting season.

== Access ==
Car
- From Okayama, Ehime, and Kōchi: About 30 minutes from Zentsuji IC of Takamatsu Expressway
- From Tokushima: About 55 minutes from Mima IC of Tokushima Expressway
Railway
- JR: About 15 minutes by taxi from Kotohira station
- Kotoden: About 20 minutes by taxi from Kotoden Kotohira Station / About 15 minutes by taxi from Okada Station
Airplane
- Takamatsu Airport: About 55 minutes by taxi

== See also ==
- List of Places of Scenic Beauty of Japan (Kagawa)
