= Manno (surname) =

Manno is a surname. Notable people with the surname include:

- Antonio Manno (1739–1810), Italian painter
- Bob Manno (born 1956), Canadian former ice hockey player
- Don Manno (1915–1995), American Major League Baseball player
- Francesco Manno (1754–1831), Italian painter and architect
- Gaetano Manno (born 1982), German former footballer
- Giuseppe Manno (1786–1868), Italian magistrate, politician and historian
- Roger Manno (born 1966), American politician
- Vincenzo Manno (1949–2018), American operatic tenor and voice teacher
