= Imakumano Kannon-ji =

Buddhist temple in Higashiyama-ku, Kyoto, Japan

- 今熊野観音寺
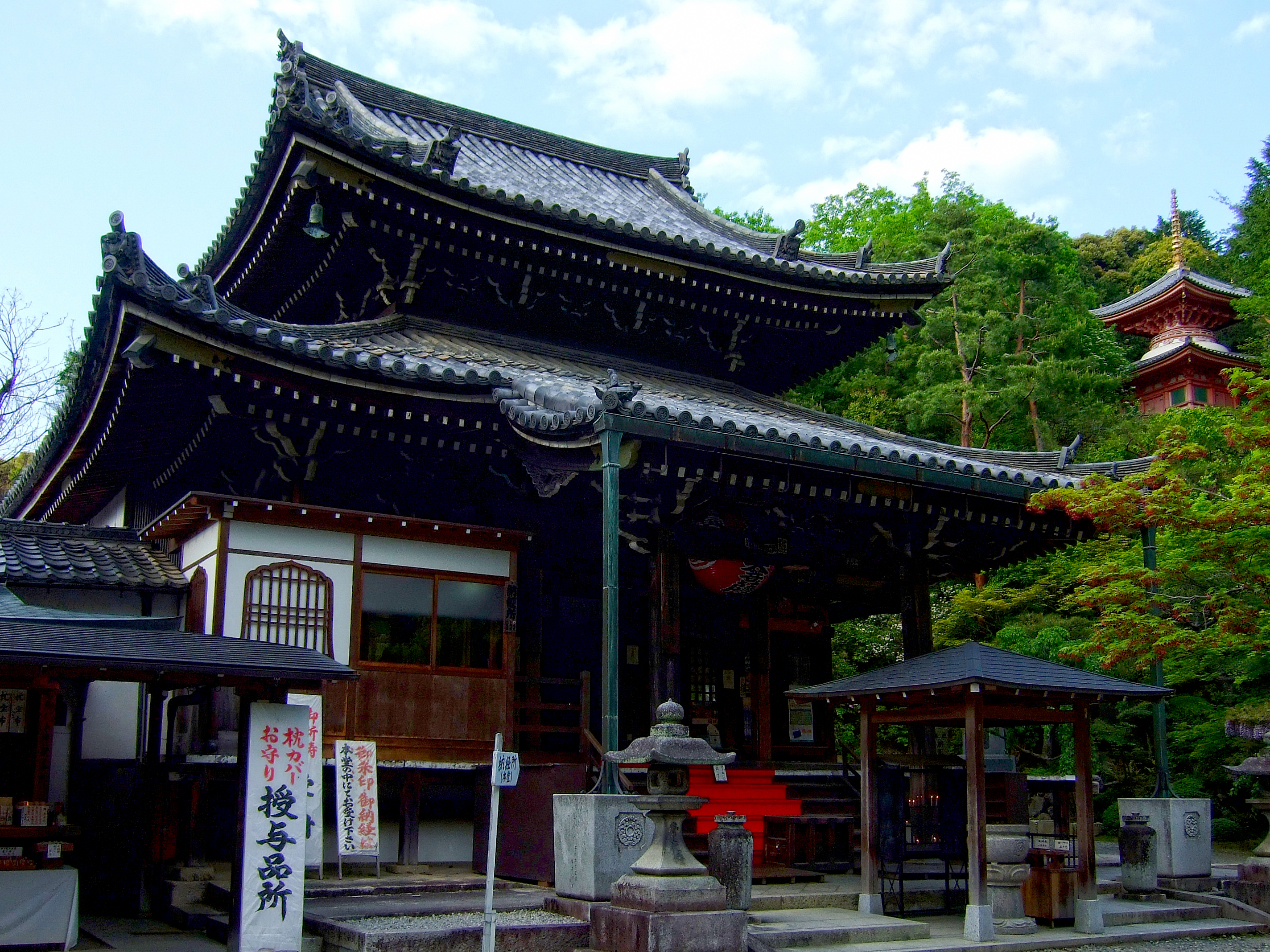
- Imakumano Kannon-jii Hondō

- Location within Kyoto Prefecture Location within Japan

Religion
- Affiliation: Buddhist
- Deity: Jūichimen Kannon
- Rite: Shingon-shū Sennyūji-ha
- Status: functional

Location
- Location: 32 Yamauchicho, Sennyuji, Higashiyama-ku, Kyoto-shi, Kyoto-fu
- Coordinates: 34°58′46.94″N 135°46′51.03″E

Architecture
- Founder: c.Kūkai, Emperor Saga
- Completed: c.807

Website
- Official website

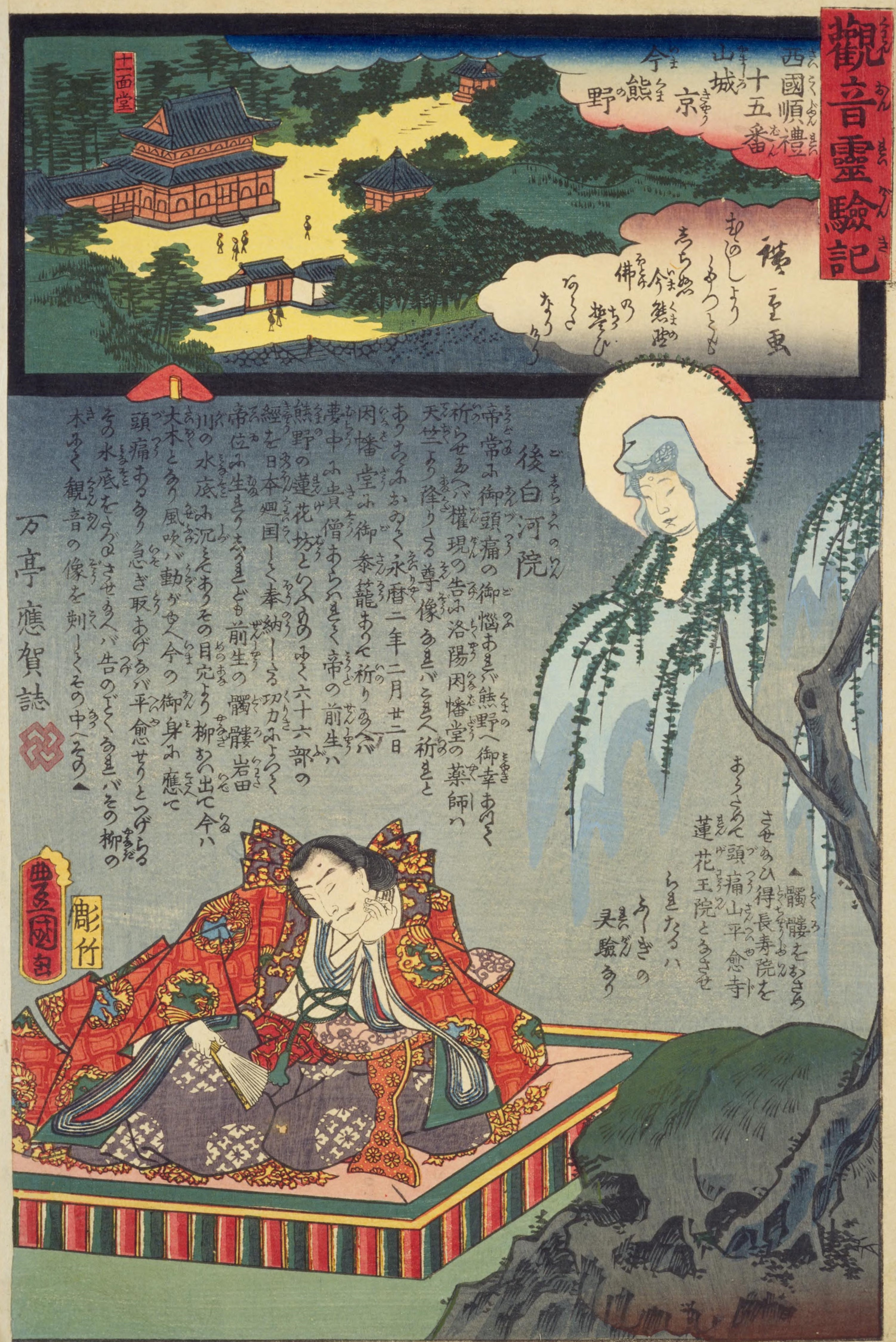
from the picture album "Kannon Reigen ki"

Imakumano Kannon-ji (今熊野観音寺) is a Buddhist temple located in the Yamauchicho, Sennyuji, neighborhood of Higashiyama-ku, Kyoto, Japan. It belongs to the Shingon-shū Sennyūji-ha sect of Japanese Buddhism and its honzon (central image) is a hibutsu (concealed / secret image) statue of Jūichimen Kannon.The temple's full name is Shin-Nachisan Kannon-ji (新那智山 観音寺). The temple is the 15th stop on the Saigoku Kannon Pilgrimage route. The official temple name is Kannon-ji, but it is commonly known as "Imakumano."

== History ==
The origin of this temple is uncertain. According to the temple's own legend, in 807, the year after Kūkai returned to Japan from studying in Tang China, he spotted a light emanating from Higashiyama. Curious, he came to the area, and Kumano Gongen appeared to him in the form of an old man. Kumano Gongen presented him with a 3.5 cm statue of the Jūichimen Kannon which had been carved by Amaterasu (the Shinto sun goddess). Kumano Gongen then instructed him to build a temple on the site.

Kūkai then carved a statue of Jūichimen Kannon, and placed the smaller statue within it. He constructed the temple as instructed with the support of Emperor Saga from 812, and the temple was completed by the Tenchō era (824–833). Furthermore, at the request of the Sadaijin Fujiwara no Otsugu, a large scale expansion of the temple was started, and was completed by his son Fujiwara no Harutsu in 855 as Hōrin-ji (法輪寺).

The residence of Kiyohara Motosuke, a poet of the mid-Heian period and father of Sei Shōnagon, is said to have been located near the temple grounds. In the late Heian period, this area came to be called Imakumano, to distinguish it from the Kumano Sanzan in Kii Province. During the reign of Emperor Shirakawa, it flourished as a center of Imakumano Shugendō, and the temple's name came to be known as Higashiyama Kannon-ji.

Emperor Goshirakawa was a devout follower of the Kumano cult, but because Kumano in Kii Province was far away and inaccessible, in 1160, he enshrined the Kumano Gongen deity at this temple as the honjibutsu of the temple's principal image, bestowed the sangō "Shin-Nachisan". The cloistered Emperor Goshirakawa claimed to have been cured of his chronic headaches by prayers at this temple, and thus the Imakumano Kannon-ji has come to be revered by the general public as the "Kannon who cures headaches".

The area southwest of the temple had long been a burial ground for aristocrats, and as a result, Kannon-ji held many of the aristocrats' funerals and memorial services. Emperor Go-Horikawa's mausoleum is adjacent to the southeast of the temple.

The temple burned down during the turmoil of the Nanboku-chō period and the Ōnin War, but it was rebuilt each time. A full restoration was completed in 1580. The current main hall was rebuilt in 1712.

== Photos of the temple grounds ==
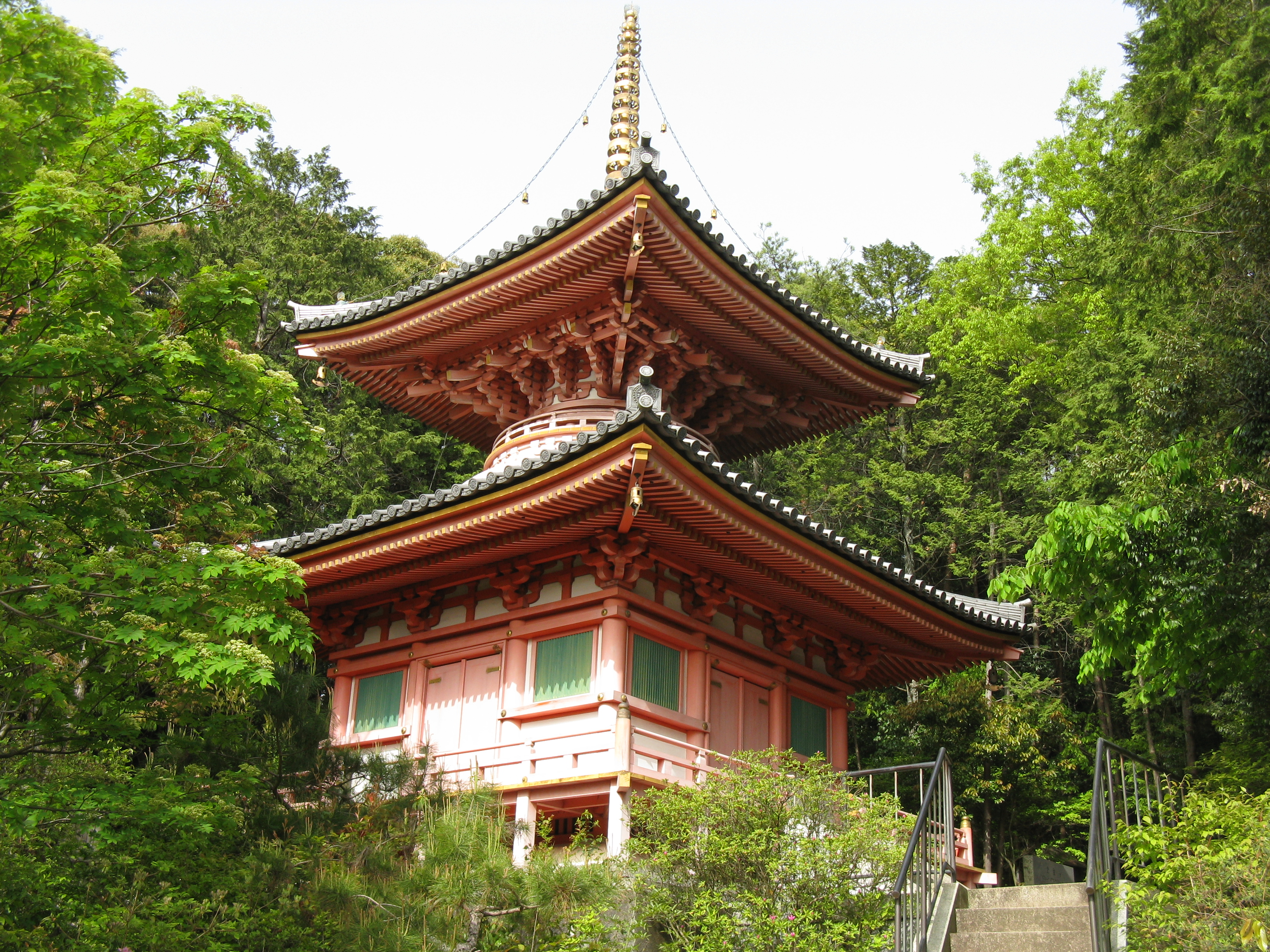
Pagoda

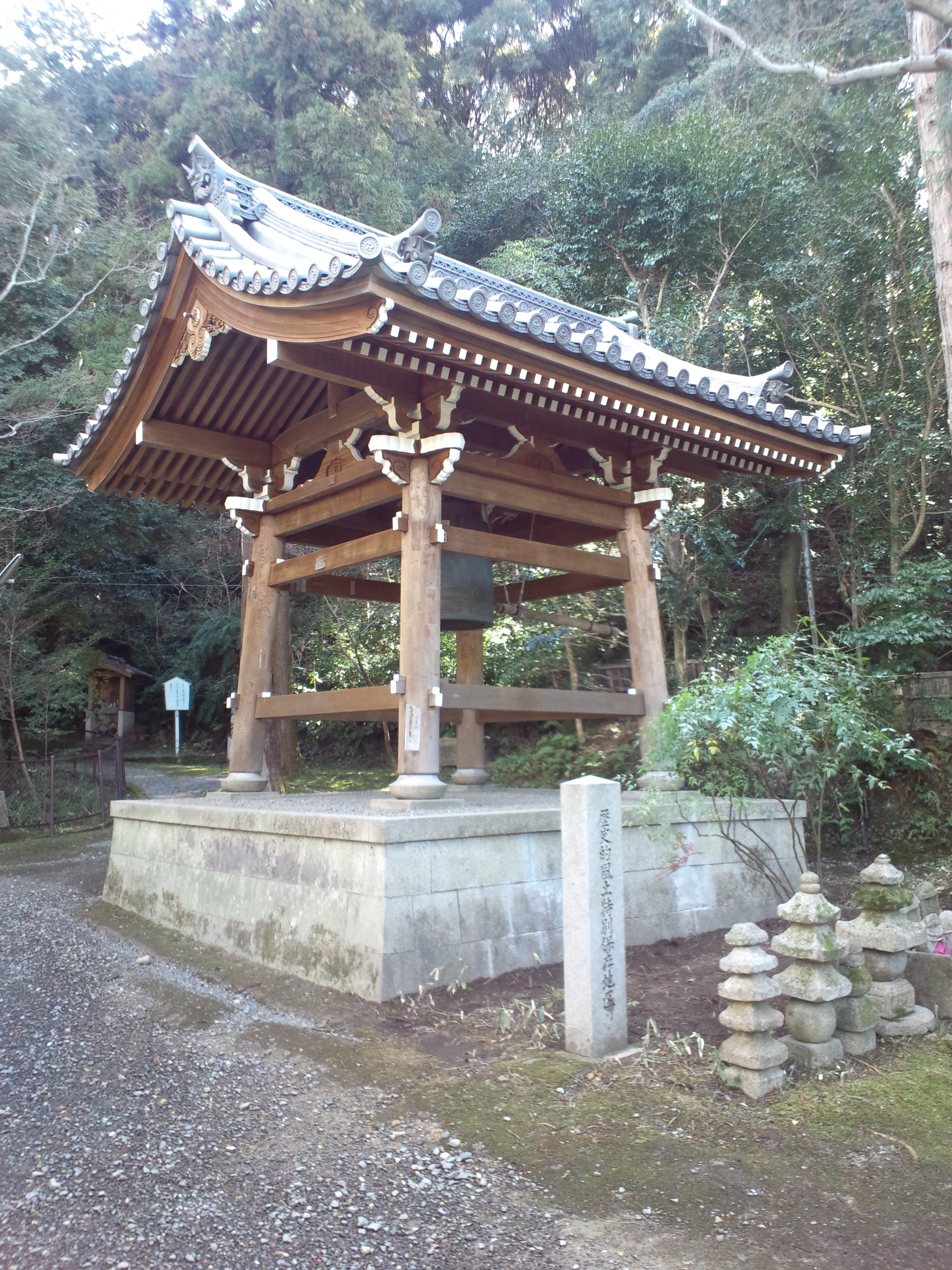
Shōrō

== Access ==
The temple is approximately a 20-minute walk from Tofukuji Station on either the JR West Nara Line or the Keihan Railway.
