= Kan'onji =

Kan'onji 観音寺市
- City
- Kan'onji City
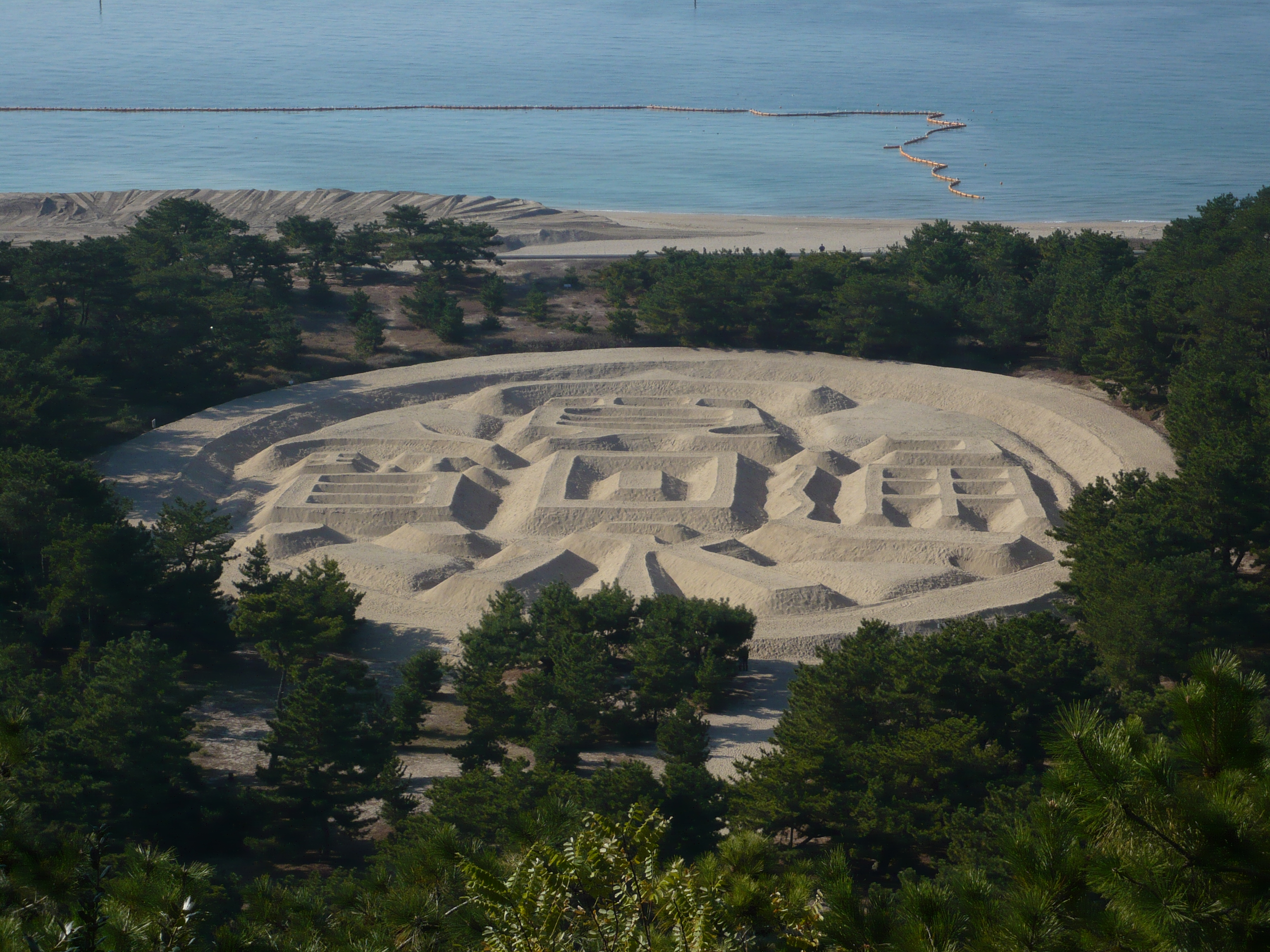
- Sand Coin Effigy (Zenigata suna-e) in Kotohiki Park

- Flag Emblem

- Location in Japan
- Coordinates: 34°7′38″N 133°39′41″E
- Country: Japan
- Region: Shikoku
- Prefecture: Kagawa

Government
  - Mayor: Akihiro Saeki (since November 20, 2021)

Area
  - Total: 117.84 km^{2} (45.50 sq mi)

Population (October 1, 2022)
  - Total: 57,921
  - Density: 491.52/km^{2} (1,273.0/sq mi)
- Time zone: UTC+09:00 (JST)
- City hall address: Sakamoto-cho 1-1-1, Kan-onji-shi, Kagawa-ken 768-8601

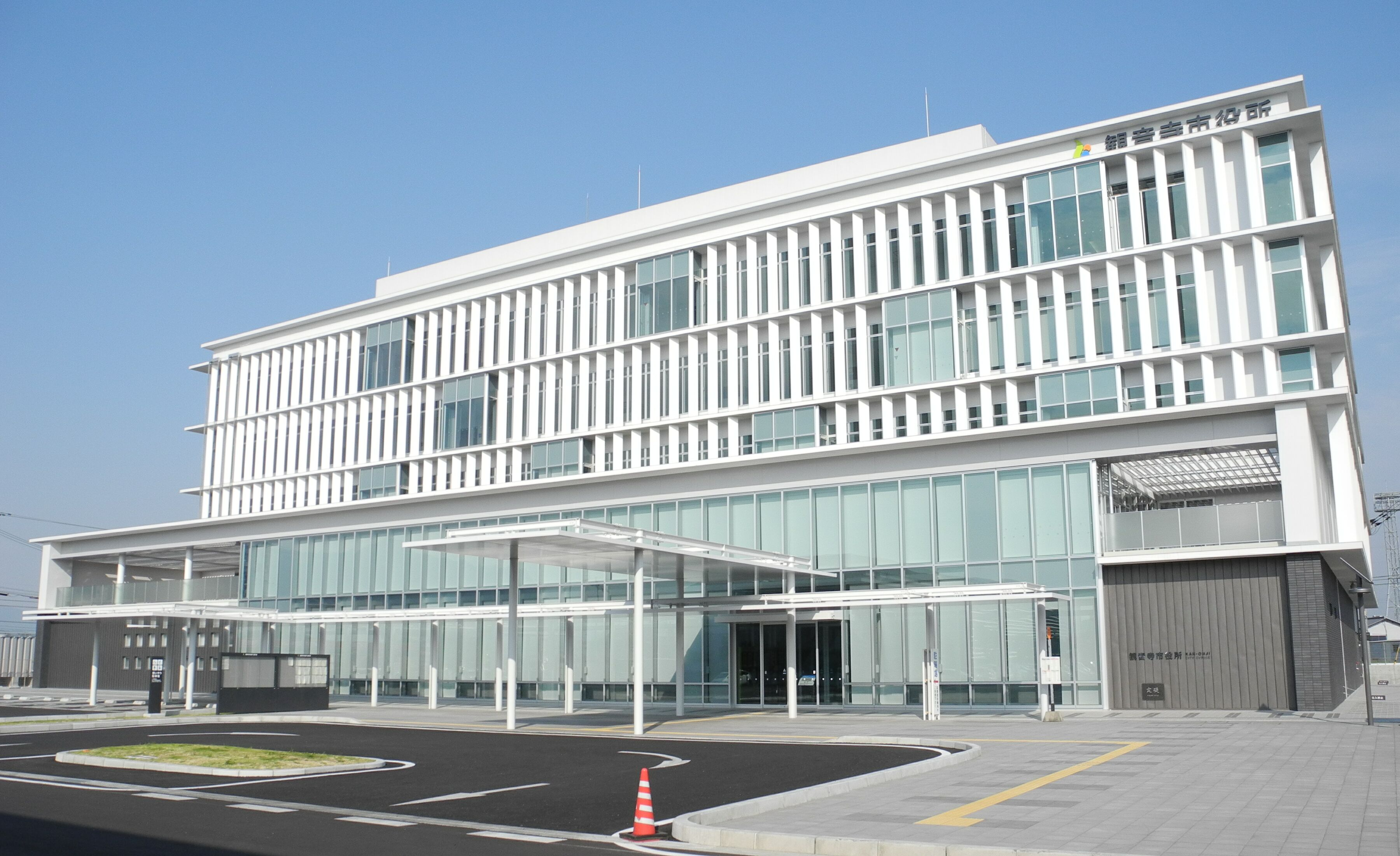
Kan'onji City Hall

View of Kan'onji, 2021

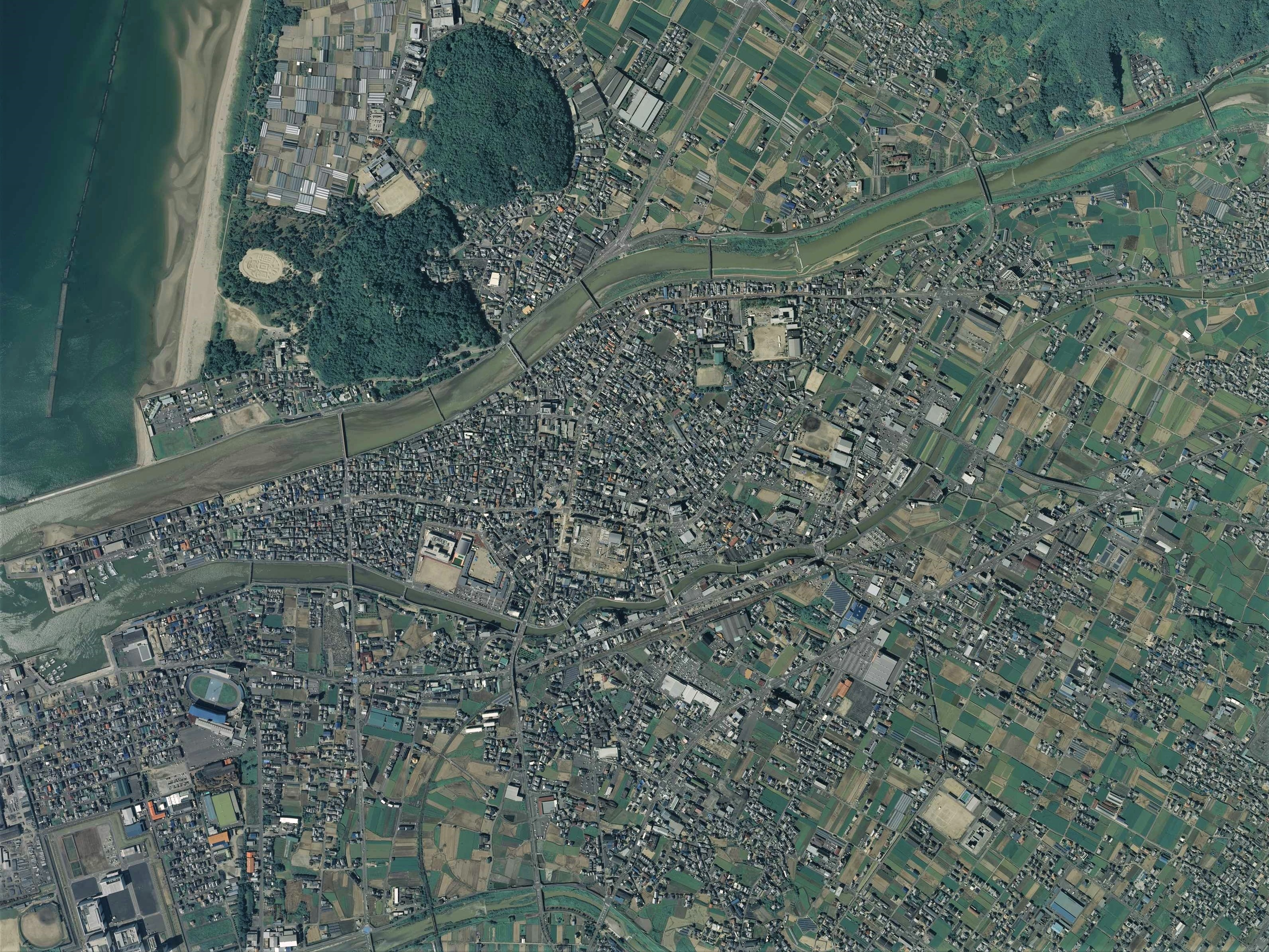
Aerial view of Kan'onji city center

Kan'onji (観音寺市, Kan'onji-shi) is a city located in Kagawa Prefecture, Japan. As of 1 October 2022, the city had an estimated population of 57,921 in 25510 households and a population density of 490 persons per km². The total area of the city is 117.84 square kilometres (45.50 sq mi).

== Geography ==
Kan'onji is located at the western end of Kagawa Prefecture. It faces the Seto Inland Sea to the west and borders Tokushima Prefecture across the Sanuki Mountains to the south. The city includes Ibuki Island in the Seto Inland Sea between Shikoku and Honshu. Some coastal parts of the city are within the borders of Setonaikai National Park.

=== Neighbouring municipalities ===
Ehime Prefecture

- Shikokuchūō

Kagawa Prefecture

- Mitoyo

Tokushima Prefecture

- Miyoshi

=== Climate ===
Kan'onji has a humid subtropical climate (Köppen Cfa) characterized by warm summers and cool winters with light snowfall. The average annual temperature in Kan'onji is 15.5 °C. The average annual rainfall is 1439 mm with September as the wettest month. The temperatures are highest on average in August, at around 26.6 °C, and lowest in January, at around 4.9 °C.

== Demographics ==
Per Japanese census data, the population of Kan'onji has been gradually declining in recent decades.

Historical population
Year	Pop.	±%
1920	54,251	—
1930	58,228	+7.3%
1940	58,708	+0.8%
1950	78,356	+33.5%
1960	73,186	−6.6%
1970	66,653	−8.9%
1980	68,435	+2.7%
1990	68,436	+0.0%
2000	66,555	−2.7%
2010	62,690	−5.8%
2020	57,438	−8.4%

== History ==
The area of Kan'onji was part of ancient Sanuki Province and has been inhabited since prehistoric times. A number of burial mounds from the Kofun period have been identified, including the Ōnohara Kofun cluster. Historical documents indicate that the Shinto shrine Kotohiki Hachiman-gū was founded in 703 and that the Buddhist temple of Kannon-ji (from which the city derives its name) was founded by the Kūkai in 803. During the Edo Period, the city area was part of the holdings of Marugame Domain under the Tokugawa shogunate. Following the Meiji restoration, the village of Kan'onji was established within Toyota District with the creation of the modern municipalities system on December 16,1878. It was elevated to town status on February 15, 1890. In 1899, Toyota district was merged with Mino District to form Mitoyo District, Kagawa. Kan'onji was elevated to city status on January 1, 1955. On October 11, 2005, the towns of Ōnohara and Toyohama (both from Mitoyo District) merged with Kan'onji.

== Government ==
Kan'onji has a mayor-council form of government with a directly elected mayor and a unicameral city council of 22 members. Kan'onji contributes three members to the Kagawa Prefectural Assembly. In terms of national politics, the town is part of Kagawa 3rd district of the lower house of the Diet of Japan.

== Economy ==
The economy of Kan'onji is primarily food-related, with the city being the largest producer of lettuce in Japan. Commercial fishing, especially for sardines, and food-processing, notably the frozen food industry, is also prominent.

== Education ==
Kan'onji has ten public elementary schools and five public middle schools operated by the city government, and one private middle school. The city has two public high schools operated by the Kagawa Prefectural Board of Education.The prefecture also operates one special education school for the handicapped.

== Transportation ==
=== Railways ===
Shikoku Railway Company - Yosan Line

- Kan'onji - Toyohama - Minoura

=== Highways ===
- Takamatsu Expressway
- National Route 11
- National Route 377

== Sister cities ==
- Appleton, Wisconsin, United States, since January 27, 1988
- Jimo District, Qingdao, Shandong, China, friendship city since July 27, 2000

== Local attractions ==
- Jinne-in, 68th temple on the Shikoku Pilgrimage
- Kannon-ji, 69th temple on the Shikoku Pilgrimage
- Kotohiki Hachiman-gū
- Kotohiki Park, which is part of the Setonaikai National Park, includes a coin-shaped sand drawing, the Zenigata Sunae, which models the Kan'ei Tsūhō.
- Ōnohara Kofun cluster, National Historic Site

== Noted people from Kan'onji ==
- Masayoshi Ōhira, Prime Minister of Japan
- Yoshinori Ohno, politician, former Minister of Defense
