= List of mergers in Kagawa Prefecture =

The following lists some of the mergers that take place within Kagawa Prefecture, Japan since the Heisei era.

== Mergers from April 1, 1999 to Present ==
- On April 1, 2002 – the towns of Ōkawa, Nagao, Sangawa, Shido and Tsuda (all from the western part of Ōkawa District) were merged to create the city of Sanuki.
- On April 1, 2003 – the towns of Hiketa, Ohchi and Shirotori (all from the eastern part of Ōkawa District) were merged to create the city of Higashikagawa. Ōkawa District was dissolved as a result of this merger.
- On March 22, 2005 – the towns of Ayauta and Hanzan (both from Ayauta District) merged into the expanded city of Marugame.
- On September 26, 2005 – the town of Shionoe (from Kagawa District) was merged into the expanded city of Takamatsu.
- On October 11, 2005 – the towns of Ōnohara and Toyohama (both from Mitoyo District) were merged to create the city of Kan'onji.
- On January 1, 2006 – the towns of Mino, Nio, Saita, Takase, Takuma, Toyonaka and Yamamoto (all from Mitoyo District) were merged to create the city of Mitoyo. Mitoyo District was dissolved as a result of this merger. (Merger Information Page)
- On January 10, 2006 – the towns of Aji and Mure (both from Kita District), the towns of Kagawa and Kōnan (both from Kagawa District) and the town of Kokubunji (from Ayauta District) were merged into the expanded city of Takamatsu. (Merger Information Page)
- On March 20, 2006 – the towns of Chūnan and Kotonami (both from Nakatado District) were merged into the expanded town of Mannō.
- On March 21, 2006 – the towns of Ikeda and Uchinomi (both from Shōzu District) were merged to create the town of Shōdoshima.
- On March 21, 2006 – the towns of Ayakami and Ryōnan (both from Ayauta District) were merged to create the town of Ayagawa.
