= List of cities in Kagawa Prefecture by population =

The following list sorts all cities (including towns and villages) in the Japanese prefecture of Kagawa with a population of more than 5,000 according to the 2020 Census. As of October 1, 2020, 16 places fulfill this criterion and are listed here. This list refers only to the population of individual cities, towns and villages within their defined limits, which does not include other municipalities or suburban areas within urban agglomerations.

== List ==
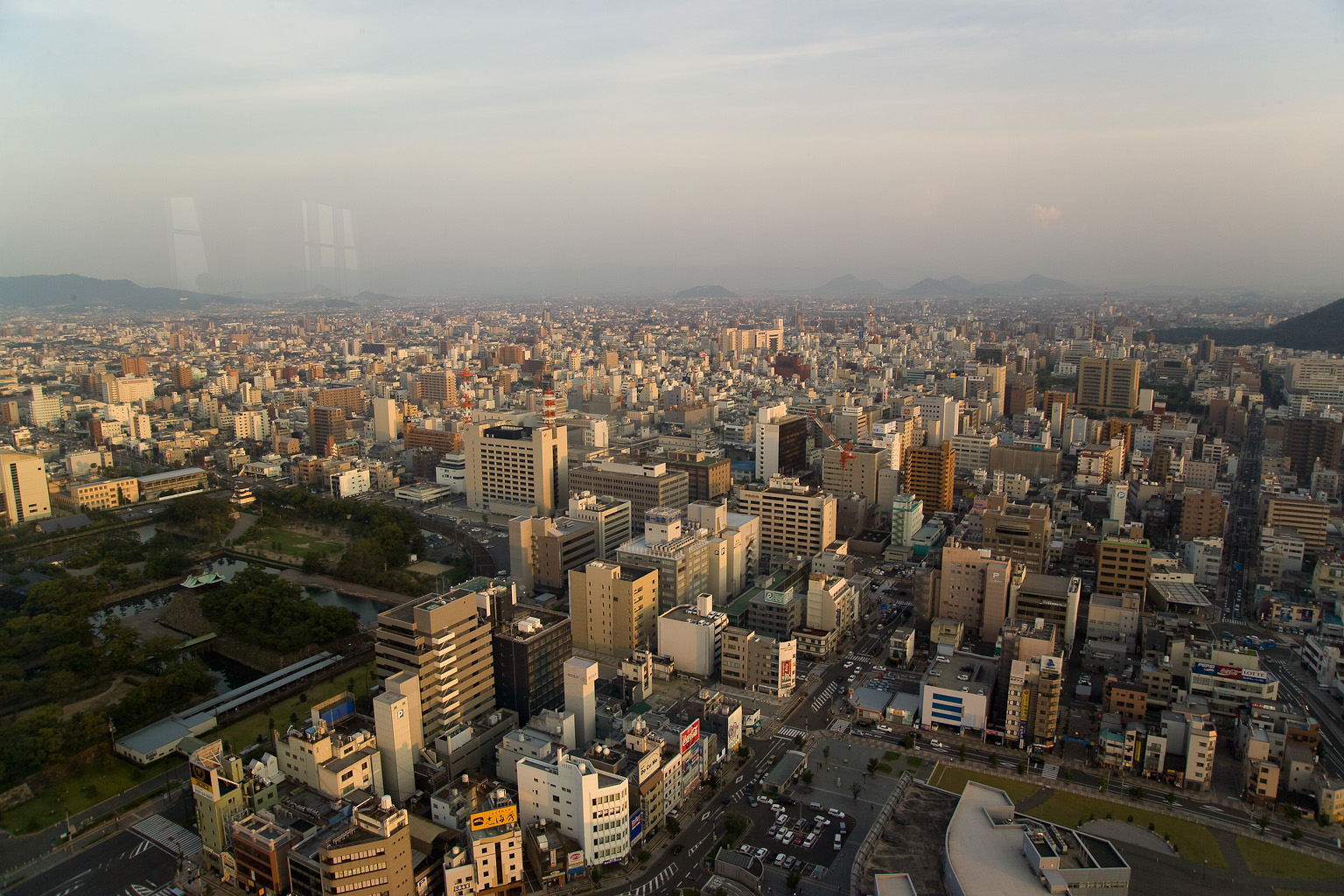
Takamatsu

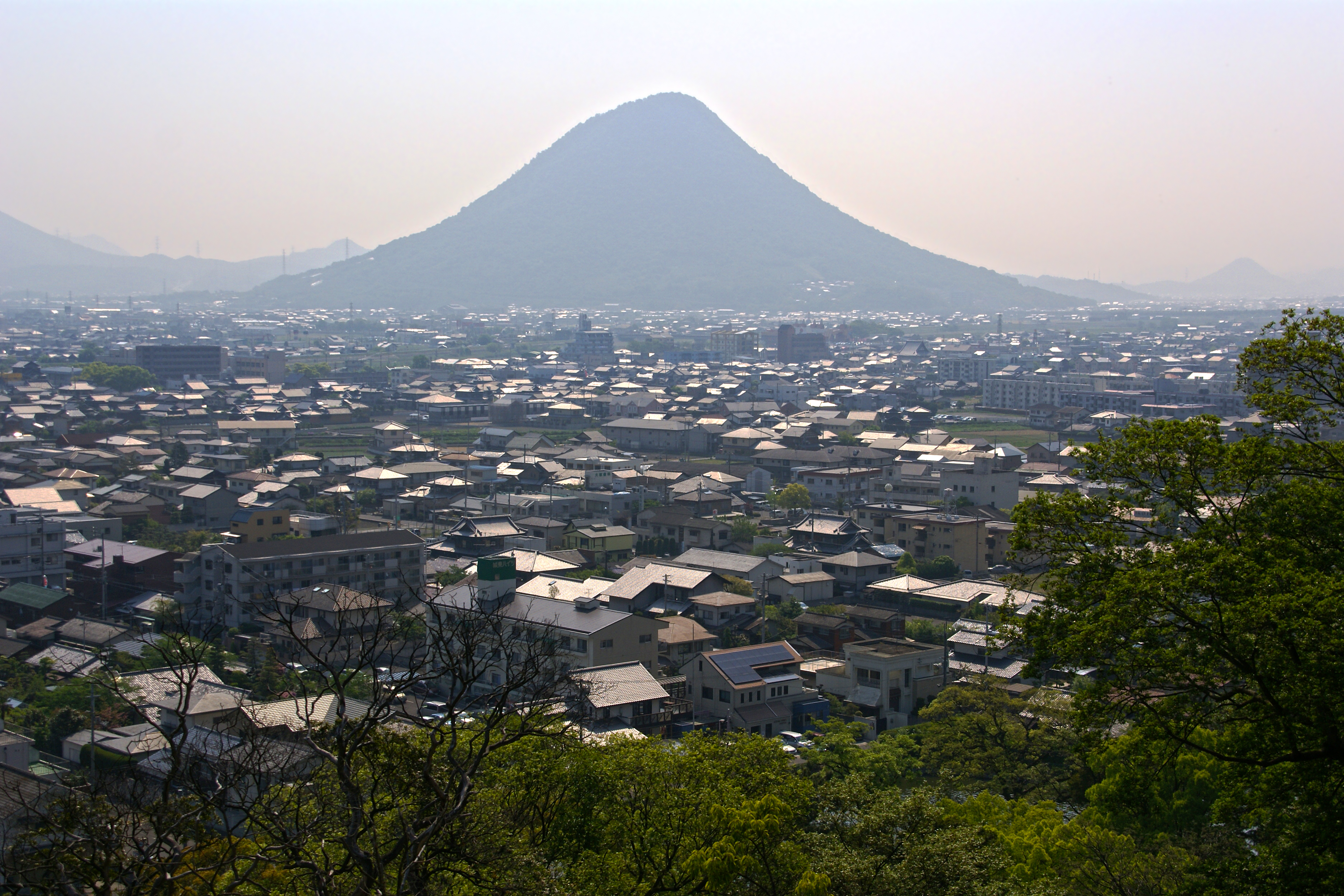
Marugame

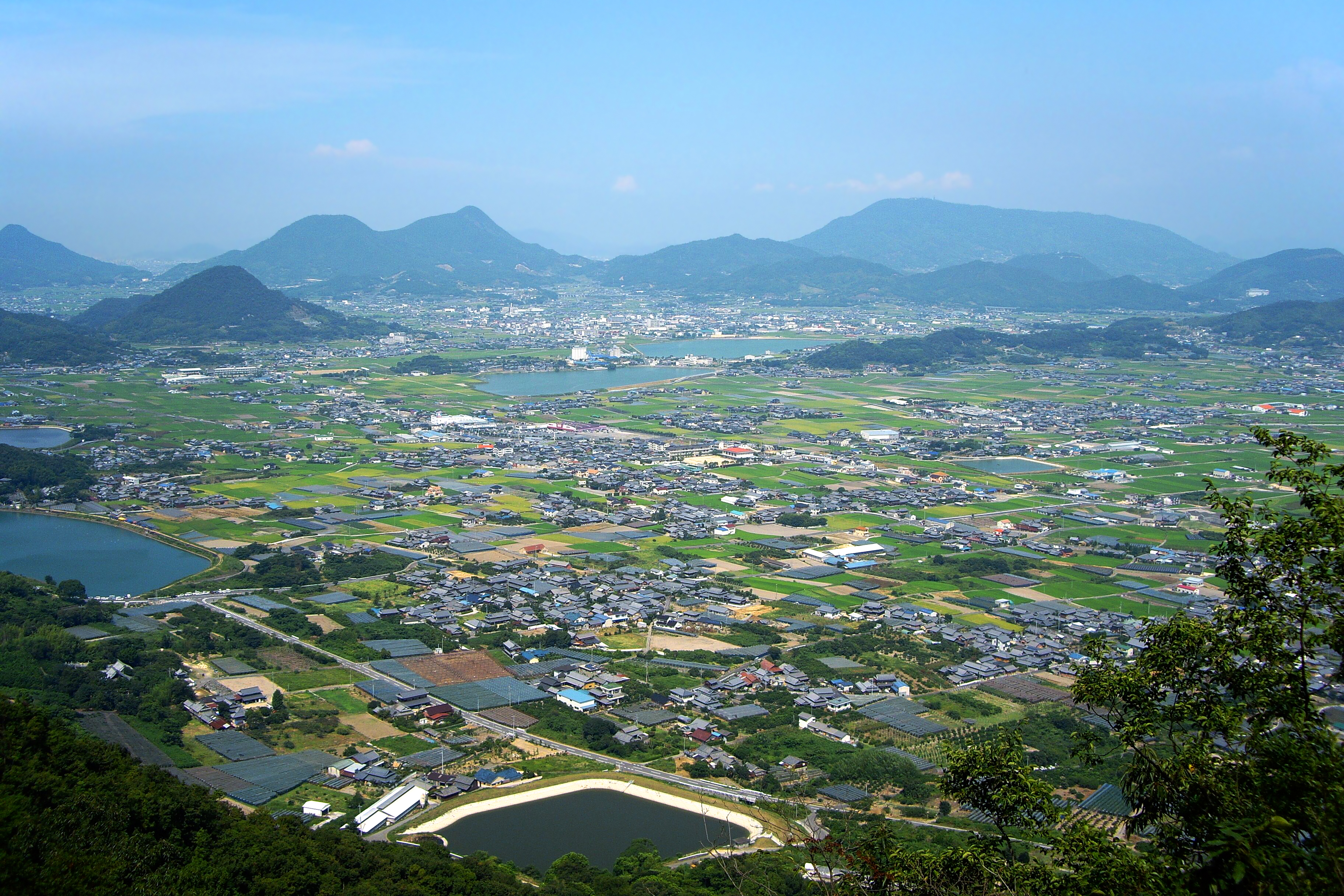
Mitoyo

The following table lists the 16 cities, villages and towns in Kagawa with a population of at least 5,000 on October 1, 2020, according to the 2020 Census. The table also gives an overview of the evolution of the population since the 1995 census.

Rank (2020)	Name	Status	2020	2015	2010	2005	2000	1995
1	Takamatsu	City	417,803	420,748	419,429	418,125	416,680	412,626
2	Marugame	City	109,589	110,010	110,473	110,085	108,356	106,107
3	Mitoyo	City	61,917	65,524	68,512	71,180	73,494	75,845
4	Kan'onji	City	57,503	59,409	62,690	65,226	66,555	67,542
5	Sakaide	City	50,683	53,164	55,621	57,266	59,228	61,351
6	Sanuki	City	47,043	50,272	53,000	55,754	57,772	58,390
7	Zentsūji	City	31,643	32,927	33,817	35,495	36,413	37,361
8	Higashikagawa	City	28,300	31,031	33,625	35,929	37,760	39,226
9	Miki	Town	26,925	27,684	28,464	28,790	28,769	27,766
10	Ayagawa	Town	22,714	23,610	24,625	25,628	26,205	25,421
11	Tadotsu	Town	22,459	23,366	23,498	23,613	23,657	23,749
12	Utazu	Town	18,704	18,952	18,434	17,460	15,978	14,928
13	Mannō	Town	17,439	18,377	19,087	19,896	20,969	21,756
14	Shōdoshima	Town	13,889	14,862	16,152	17,257	18,303	19,700
15	Tonoshō	Town	12,856	14,002	15,123	16,411	17,711	19,074
16	Kotohira	Town	8,476	9,186	9,967	10,747	11,335	12,002
