= Mitoyo (disambiguation) =

Mitoyo may refer to:

== Places ==
- Mitoyo, Kagawa, a city in Kagawa Prefecture, Japan
- Mitoyo District, Kagawa, a former district in Kagawa Prefecture

== People ==
- Mitoyo Kawate (1889–2003), Japanese supercentenarian
