= Mino, Kagawa =

Mino 三野町
- Former municipality
- A scenic mountain in Mino, Kagawa

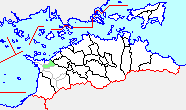
- Location of Mino in Kagawa Prefecture

- Location in Japan
- Coordinates: 34.20560°N 133.71057°E
- Country: Japan
- Region: Shikoku
- Prefecture: Kagawa Prefecture
- District: Mitoyo
- Merged: January 1, 2006 (now part of Mitoyo)

Area
  - Total: 19.34 km^{2} (7.47 sq mi)

Population (November 1, 2005)
  - Total: 9,952
  - Density: 514.6/km^{2} (1,333/sq mi)
- Time zone: UTC+09:00 (JST)
- Symbols
- Flower: Sakura
- Tree: Satsuki azalea

Mino (三野町, Mino-chō) was a town located in Mitoyo District, Kagawa Prefecture, Japan.

As of 2005, the town had an estimated population of 9,952. The total area was 19.34 km^{2}.

On January 1, 2006, Mino, along with the towns of Nio, Saita, Takase, Takuma, Toyonaka and Yamamoto (all from Mitoyo District), was merger to create the city of Mitoyo and no longer exists as an independent municipality.

Mino had a sister city relationship with Evansville (Indiana), Unadilla (New York State), Sanyuan County in the city of Xianyang (Shaanxi China) and Florenville (Belgium).

The city of Mitoyo gets its name from the Mitoyo District which originally got half of its name from an older district called Mino District, and the other half from Toyota District (豊田郡).

== History ==
- March 16, 1899 - Mino District was dissolved by incorporating parts of it into the neighboring Toyota and Mitoyo Districts.
- April 1, 1955 - Shimotakase Village, Omi Village, and Yoshizu Village were merged to create Mino Village.
- September 1, 1961 - Renamed Mino Town.
- January 1, 2006 - Mino was merged with 6 other towns to create Mitoyo City.

== Education ==
Mino's Junior High School

The following were kindergarten, elementary, and junior high schools in the town. There were no high schools or secondary schools in Mino.

- Shimotakase Kindergarten
- Yoshizu Kindergarten
- Omi Kindergarten
- Shimotakase Elementary School
- Yoshizu Elementary School
- Omi Elementary School
- Minotsu Junior High School

== Transportation ==
- Shikoku Railway Company(JR Shikoku)
  - Yosan Line
    - Mino Station
    - Tsushima no Miya Station - This station is only open for two days a year during the summer. August 4 and August 5 from 8:00 AM to 3:30 PM. It was built in 1916. The train schedule for this station is available from June to August only.
- Highways
  - Expressway
    - Takamatsu Expressway - There is an on/off ramp in Mino, but only heading towards Takamatsu for the on-ramp and towards Matsuyama for the off-ramp.
  - National Highways
    - Route 11
  - Regional Highways
    - Route 21 - Marugame to Takuma to Kan'onji
    - Route 23 - Takuma to Kotohira
    - Route 48 - Zentsuji to Takuma
  - Local Routes
    - Route 220 Omi to Yoshizu to Nio
    - Route 221 Miyao to Takase
    - Route 222 Shimotakase to Takase

== Places and events ==
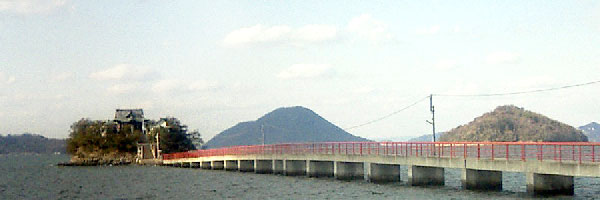
Tsushima Shrine

- Fureai Park Mino
- Tsushima Jinja Shrine (津島神社) - Summer Festival
- Koueizan Honmonji Temple (Daibou)
  - Daibouichi - End of November Exhibition

=== Shikoku 88 Temple Pilgrimage ===
- Number 71 Iyadani Temple 34°13′47.8″N 133°43′28.2″E

== Famous People From Mino ==
Kaname Jun (要潤)

Kento Momota (桃田 賢斗)
