= Shishijima =

Native name: 志々島
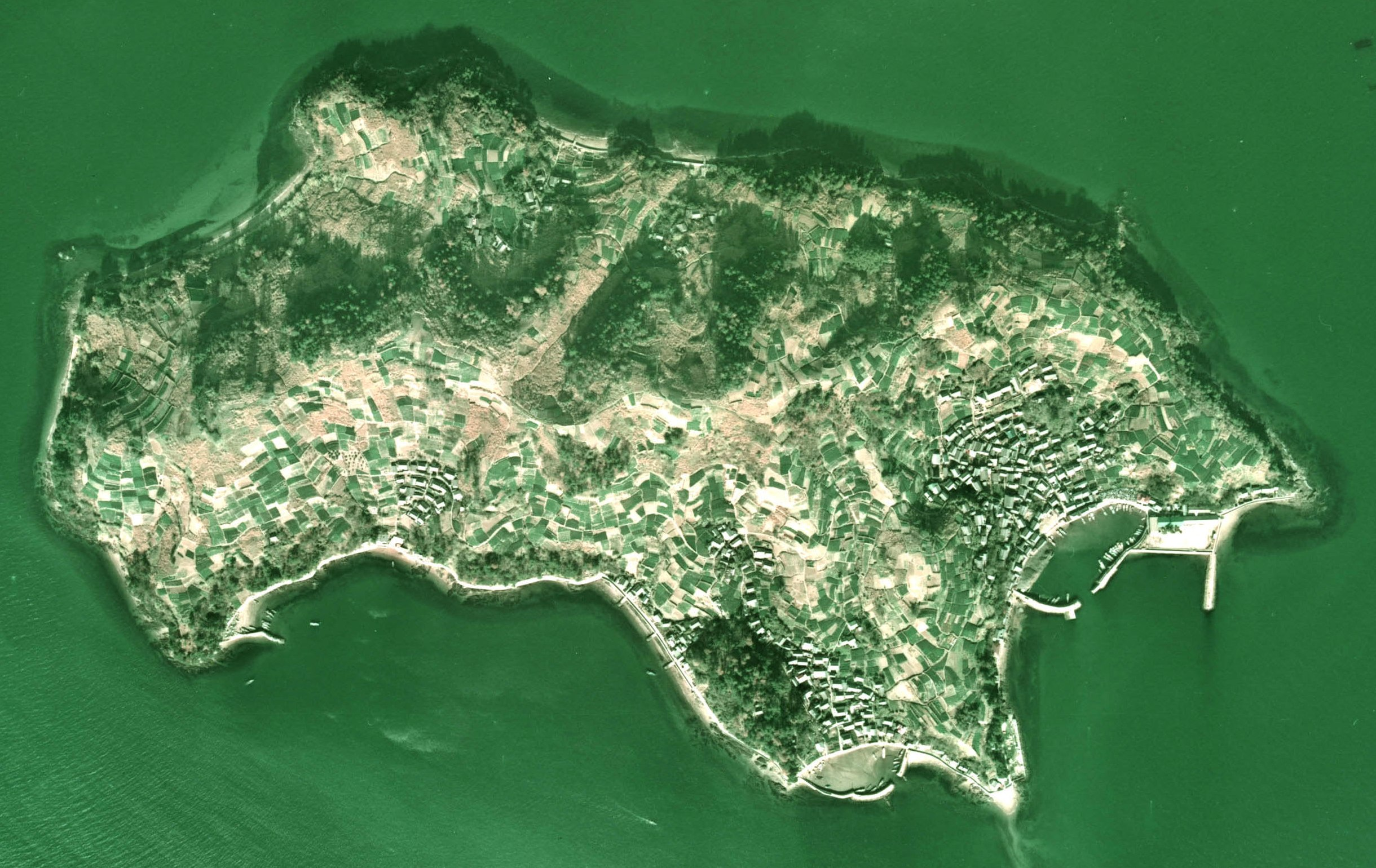
- Shishijima in 1974

- Location within Kagawa Prefecture Location within Japan

Geography
- Location: Seto Inland Sea
- Coordinates: 34°16′17″N 133°40′38″E
- Archipelago: Shiwaku Islands
- Area: 0.74 km^{2} (0.29 sq mi)
- Highest elevation: 109.14 m (358.07 ft)

Administration
- Japan
- Prefecture: Kagawa Prefecture
- City: Mitoyo

Shishijima (志々島) is an inhabited island located in the Shiwaku Islands in the Seto Inland Sea between Honshū and Shikoku. It is administratively part of the city of Mitoyo, Kagawa, Japan.

The island has a circumference of 3.8 kilometers and an area of 0.74 square kilometres (0.29 square miles), and is located approximately 6 kilometres (3.7 miles) away from Takuma Port. The highest peak on the island is Yokoo no Tsuji with an elevation of 109 meters. To the north is Takamishima, and to the west is Awashima. It has been inhabited since ancient times and there is a legend that Empress Jingū enshrined a sacred seal on the island. In the Sengoku period, it was a place of refuge for then local warlord Kagawa Nobukane after the fall of Amagiri Castle to the forces of Chōsokabe Motochika. During the Edo Period, it was part of the holdings of Marugame Domain. At the end of the Edo Period, it had a population of 673 and was noted for exporting dried Sea cucumber and other seafoods. During the Meiji and Taisho periods the island continued to be prosperous, and had a population of approximately 1000; however, in the post-World War II era, the island suffered greatly from rural depopulation and as of March 2009 had a population of only 32 people in 26 households.
