= Missing Post Office =

Art installation on Awashima Island, Kagawa Prefecture, Japan

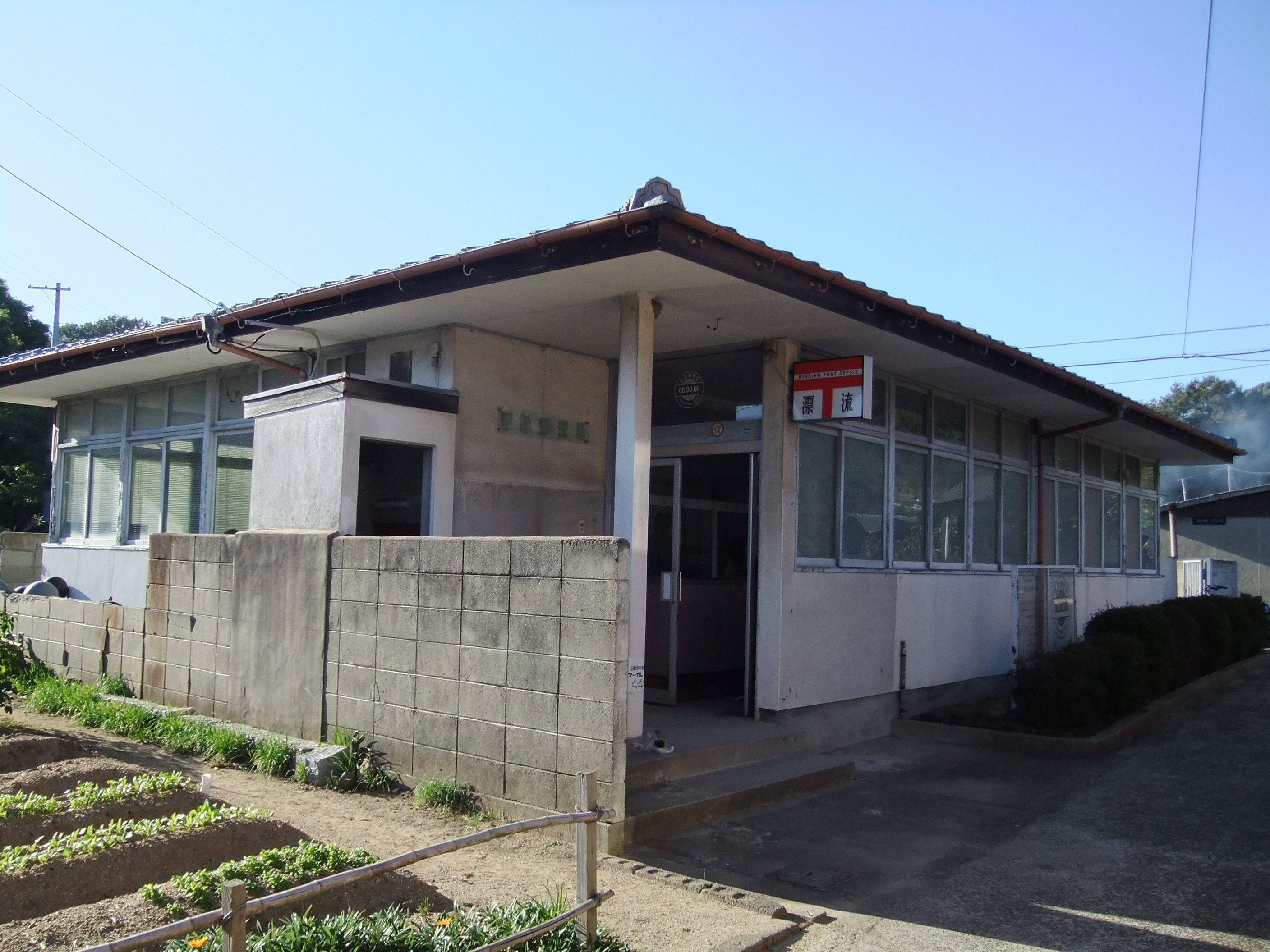
- The Missing Post Office building in October 2014
- Interactive map of the Missing Post Office area

General information
- Type: Post office
- Location: 1317-2 Takumacho Awashima; Mitoyo, Kagawa 769-1108, Japan
- Coordinates: 34.27054°N 133.63157°E

The Missing Post Office (Japanese: 漂流郵便局, Hyōryū Yūbinkyoku, "drifting post office") is an artwork by Japanese artist Saya Kubota as an installation for the Setouchi Triennale in 2013. It is not affiliated with Japan Post. It is a "post office" where undeliverable letters are collected, using the former Awashima Post Office building on Awashima Island in Mitoyo City, Kagawa Prefecture. Kubota serves as the "post office worker" of the Missing Post Office, and Katsuhisa Nakata, the former postmaster of the Awashima Post Office, as the "postmaster". The public is encouraged to send mail there, preferably on postcards. Its address is c/o Hyoryu Yubinkyoku 1317-2 Takumacho Awashima, Mitoyo Kagawa 769-1108 Japan.

== Post office installation ==
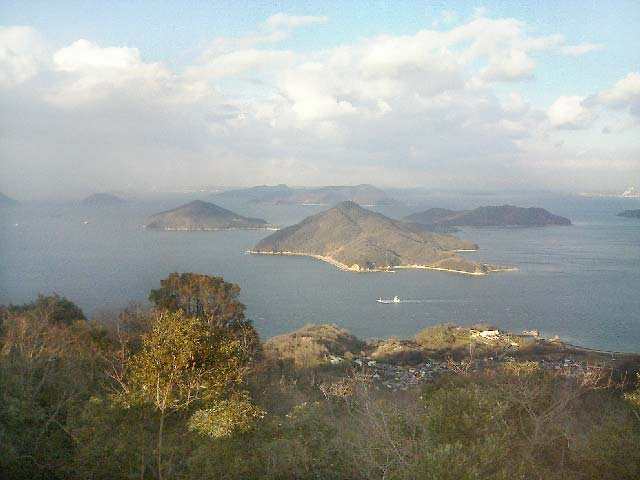
Awashima Island

The Missing Post Office is in the renovated wooden post office building on Awashima Island, which was built in 1964 and in service until 1991. The building is 10 minutes on foot from Awashima Port. Letters received at the post office are stored in a "Missing Post Office Box", designed and constructed by Kosuke Nagata with the help of Junpei Matsushima. There are 100 of these metal boxes, suspended from the ceiling by piano wire. The concept of the Post Office Box is based on the idea that it cannot be stocked and held in place because the address is unknown. The Post Office Box is designed to make the sound of waves when turned.

The Missing Post Office receives mail from all over the world. Addressees include deceased individuals, future descendants, first loves to whom the writers were never able to express their feelings, themselves, and long-time favorite items. Letters to the deceased are especially common. The sender's name does not need to be written, and the item is sent as "Missing Post Office general delivery". The Missing Post Office prefers postcards to sealed letters. "Posting sets" with the Post Office's address are sold there, and some visitors write messages on the spot.

As of November 2022, the Missing Post Office is open from 13:00 to 16:00 on the second and fourth Saturdays of the month. Only postmaster Nakata is usually present. Received pieces of mail are displayed as works of art and can be read by anyone, but staff do not know what message is in which Post Office Box, and after being read, there is no guarantee they will return to the original Post Office Box and will instead continue to "drift". A visitor who believes a message is addressed to them is permitted to retain it.

== History ==
Many things drift ashore on Awashima Island. Visiting the island to seek inspiration before the Setouchi International Art Festival, Kubota saw her reflection in the window of the former post office, felt that she had "washed up here", and decided to create the Missing Post Office as "a place where people could experience the same sensation that I did."

The Missing Post Office opened as part of the Setouchi International Art Festival on October 5, 2013. During the festival, it was open from 10:00 to 17:00 with an entrance fee of 300 yen. About 400 pieces of mail were collected during the month-long festival; when about 200 a month continued to arrive after the festival, Kubota decided to keep the Missing Post Office open.

On May 10, 2014, when more than 1,500 messages had been received, the project was introduced on NHK General Television's NHK News Ohayo Nippon. On August 24, 2014, a "Missing Post Office in Takamatsu Airport" was installed, extending the project off the island. From October 18 to October 20, the post office had a special "Autumn Opening", and a live concert was held by the "Monk Band", consisting of active monks. In January 2016, a London branch opened.

The Missing Post Office had received 3,500 messages by January 2015, and more than 3,800 by the following month when the book Missing Post Office was published, inspired by a Shogakukan editor who visited the Missing Post Office in the summer of 2014 and saw visitors reading the letters. A "Publication Commemorative Opening" was held on February 7, 2015.

== In popular culture ==
The Missing Post Office appears at the end of the third episode of the January 24 broadcast of the 2022 Fuji TV drama series Don't Call it Mystery.

It is mentioned in The Republic of Happiness, by Ito Ogawa.

== See also ==
- Message in a bottle
- Bridegroom's Oak
- PostSecret
- Wind phone
