= Shiudeyama Site =

Yayoi period settlement trace in Mitoyo, Kagawa, Japan

Coordinates: 34°14′38″N 133°35′47″E

Shiudeyama site
- 紫雲出山遺跡 (Japanese)
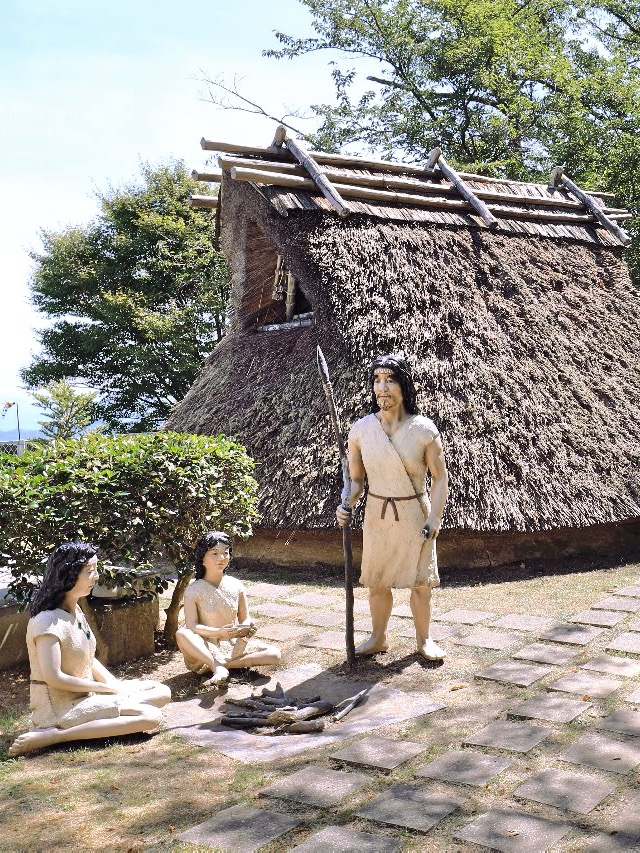
- Shiudeyama site

- Shiudeyama site Shiudeyama Site (Japan)
- Interactive map of Shiudeyama site
- Type: Settlement trace
- Periods: Yayoi period
- Location: Mitoyo, Kagawa, Japan
- Region: Shikoku

Site notes
- Public access: Yes (park and museum)

The Shiudeyama Site (紫雲出山遺跡, Shiudeyama iseki) is an archaeological site with the traces of a mid- to late-Yayoi period settlement located in the Takuma neighborhood of the city of Mitoyo, Kagawa Prefecture, on the island of Shikoku of Japan. It was designated a National Historic Site in 2019.

== Overview ==
The Shiudeyama Site is located near the summit of Mt. Shiudeyama (352 meters), the highest point in the central part of the Misaki Peninsula. It occupies a strategic position overlooking the Hiuchi Gulf of the Seto Inland Sea. Discovered in 1947 and first excavated from 1955–57, the ruins were significant in that it was found to be a fortified settlement, with the foundations of a fortification, watchtowers and beacons along with the foundations of pit dwellings. It appeared to have been an important military site for monitoring sea routes while maintaining a close relationship with the Kinai region. The earliest artifacts date from the beginning of the middle Yayoi period. It appears that towards the middle of the mid-Yayoi period, the size of the settlement expanded and the population increased; however, the site came to an abrupt end. By the late Yayoi period, Funakoshi Village, the successor of the site, was located in a lowland about two kilometers southeast of the ruins, so it can be surmised that political and social changes no longer required living on inconvenient mountaintops.

Excavated artifacts included shell rings, hooks made of antler, large bivalves including animal bones, and shell mounds mainly consisting of turban shells from the first half of the middle Yayoi period were unearthed. Along with a large amount of Yayoi pottery, a wide variety of chipped stone tools such as stone arrowheads, stone spears, stone knives, as well as polished stone axes. The large quantity of weapons and the sudden end of the settlement have led to speculation that this was a Yayoi period battle site.

In August 1988, during the excavation survey accompanying the construction of a museum, a circular pit dwelling site measuring 2.8 x 3.2 meters and a high-floor warehouse measuring 2.5 meters on a side were discovered. The site of the residence and layout of structures had a marked resemblance to the Songguk-ri site on the Korean Peninsula, which is of contemporary date. Furthermore, in 2016, the remains of a large pillar-supported building were discovered, raising the possibility that this site was intended to monitor traffic in the Seto Inland Sea.

The site has been preserved as an archaeological park with a museum and reconstruction of a pit dwelling.

== See also ==
- List of Historic Sites of Japan (Kagawa)
