= Ninomiya Kiln ruins =

Remains of Nara period kilns in Mitoyo, Japan

Ninomiya Tile Kiln ruins
- 二ノ宮窯跡 (Japanese)
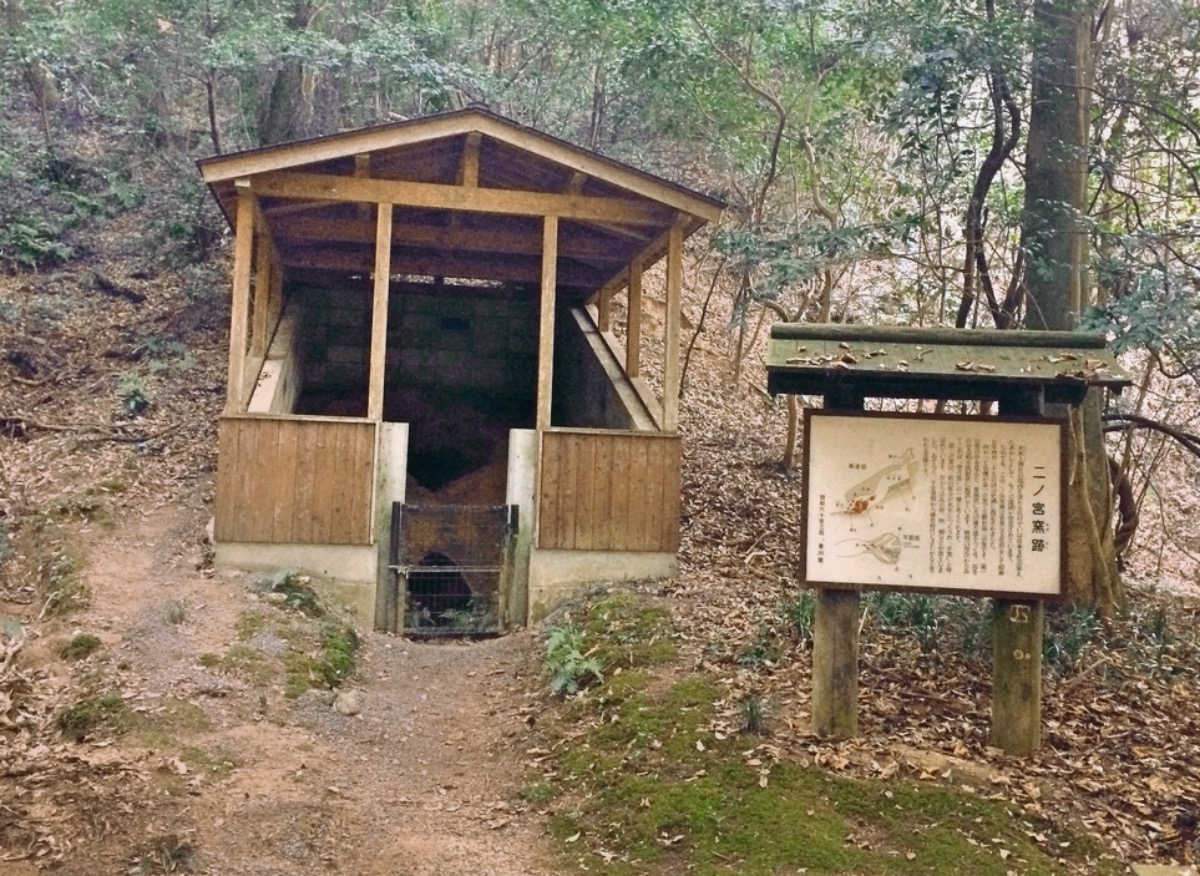
- Ninomiya Tile Kiln ruins

- Ninomiya Tile Kiln ruins Ninomiya Kiln ruins (Japan)
- Interactive map of Ninomiya Tile Kiln ruins
- 34°08′52″N 133°45′17″E
- Periods: Heian period
- Location: Mitoyo, Kagawa, Japan
- Region: Shikoku

Site notes
- Public access: Yes

Ninomiya Tile Kiln ruins (二ノ宮窯跡, Ninomiya kama ato) is an archaeological site consisting of the remains of two Nara period kilns located in what is now the Takase neighborhood of the city of Mitoyo, Kagawa Prefecture on the island of Shikoku, Japan. It has been protected by the central government as a National Historic Site since 1932.

== Overview ==
The use of tiled roofs, which was a symbol of continental culture and the advanced state of the central administration, spread during the Asuka and Nara period to Buddhist temples and regional administrative centers. The Ninomiya kilns are located on the slope of a hill within the precincts of the Ōminakami Shrine, which is the ninomiya (second shrine), of Sanuki Province. The kiln ruins were discovered in 1925. This kiln site was built from the late Heian period to the Kamakura period, and consists of the ruin of two kilns, one of which has an elliptical body and a firing port facing north. It is a noborigama climbing kiln with several vein-shaped fire grooves on the bottom and a mounting base on which roof tiles are placed. Flat tiles used at the eaves with arabesque patterns were excavated from the inside. The other kiln was a square, flat, kiln, with the firing port facing northeast and a built-in base with several fire grooves. Eaves tiles, earthenware, and ink-stones have been excavated from the inside. The site is about 20 minutes by car from the JR Shikoku Yosan Line Takase Station.

== See also ==
- List of Historic Sites of Japan (Kagawa)
