= Yamamoto, Kagawa =

Abolished town in Mitoyo, Kagawa, Japan

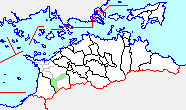

Yamamoto (山本町, Yamamoto-chō) was a town located in Mitoyo District, Kagawa Prefecture, Japan.

As of 2003, the town had an estimated population of 7,584 and a density of 227.68 persons per km^{2} (592.3 persons per mi^{2}). The total area was 33.31 km^{2} (12.8 mi^{2}).

On January 1, 2006, Mito, along with the towns of Mino, Nio, Saita, Takase, Takuma and Toyonaka (all from Mitoyo District), was merged to create the city of Mitoyo and no longer exists as an independent municipality.

== Geography ==
- Western part of Kagawa
- Rivers: Saita River, Kaunda River, Kouchi River

== History ==
- A long time ago - Yamamoto was part of Toyota District.
- April 1, 1955 - Mitoyo District's Tsuji Village, Kouchi Village, Kōda Village, and Saita-Ono Village were merged to create Yamamoto Village.
- November 3, 1957 - Renamed Yamamoto Town.
- January 1, 2006 - Yamamoto was merged with 6 other towns to create Mitoyo city.

== Administration ==
=== Mayor ===
1955 Founder Hara (数栄)
1959 2nd Maya (真屋 友一)
1971 3rd Ando (安藤 要)
1979 4th Hara (原 正司)
1991 5th Iwakura (岩倉 礼一)
1999 6th Ohashi (大橋 良男)

== Education ==
The following were elementary and junior high schools in the town. There were no high schools or secondary schools in Mino.

- Tsuji Elementary School
- Kouchi Elementary School
- Ono Elementary School
- Kaunda Elementary School
- Mitoyo Junior High School

== Transportation ==
- Bus
  - Takase Jishou Unkou(Independent Carrier)
- Highways
  - Expressway
    - There was no Takamatsu Expressway connection in Yamamoto, but there was one in Toyonaka, north of Yamamoto.
  - National Highways
    - Route 377
  - Regional Highways
    - Route 5 - Kan'onji(Kagawa and Tokushima)
    - Route 6 - Kan'onji(Kagawa and Tokushima)
- Shikoku Railway Company(JR Shikoku)
  - There is no railroad in Yamamoto, but there is one in Toyonaka to the north and Saita to the south

== Famous Places and Events ==
=== Shikoku 88 Temple Pilgrimage ===
- Number 67 Daikoji Temple

== Famous People From Yamamoto ==
- Mise Kouji (Fukuoka SoftBank Hawks)
