= Konpira Grand Theatre =

Building in Kotohira, Kagawa Prefecture, Japan

- 金毘羅大芝居
- Kanamaru-za (金丸座)
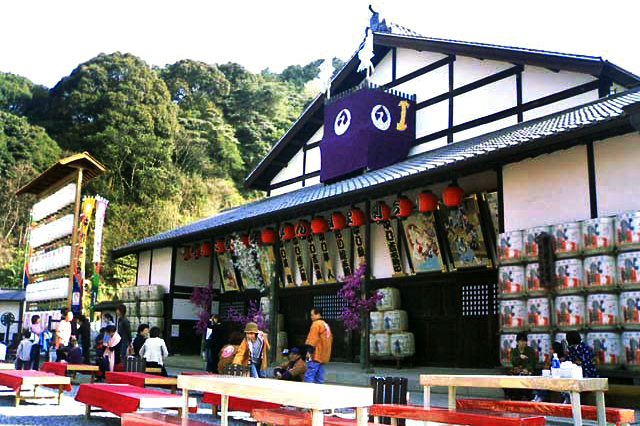
- The front of the Konpira Grand Theatre
- Interactive map of Konpira Grand Theatre
- Address: 香川県仲多度郡琴平町乙１２４１; 1241 Kotohira-chō, Nakatado District, Kagawa Prefecture; Kotohira, Kagawa Prefecture; Japan
- Coordinates: 34.184633°N 133.818028°E
- Owner: Kotohira-chō Shikoku Konpira Kabuki Grand Theatre Promotion Association
- Capacity: 1000–1200
- Type: Kabuki theater
- Designation: Important Cultural Property

Construction
- Opened: 1836

Website
- http://www.konpirakabuki.jp/index.html

The Konpira Grand Theatre (金毘羅大芝居 Konpira Ōshibai), also known as the Kanamaru-za (金丸座), is a restored kabuki theatre in Kotohira, Kagawa, on the island of Shikoku, Japan. It was originally constructed in 1835, and is the oldest kabuki theatre in Japan. Kabuki plays are performed for one month each year, usually in April.

== History ==
The theatre was originally built in 1835 and 1836, and takes its name from the nearby Konpira Shrine which is in turn named after the Hindu/Buddhist deity Kumbhira to which the shrine is dedicated. Prior to its construction, small temporary theatres were frequently built on the site, and doubled as lottery halls. The design was based on that of the Ōnishi Theatre of Osaka, and the construction costs, amounting to roughly 1000 ryō, were raised by the local geisha community.

The theatre was originally controlled by the Kanemitsu-in, a local Buddhist temple, but in 1877 came to be owned by a man by the name of Kyōhō, an otokodate, wealthy merchant, gang leader, and head of the local fire brigade. He changed the name of the theatre to the Inari-za (named after the Shintō deity Inari), and ran full-day programs as many other major theatres throughout the country began to cut down and only show selected scenes for a few hours a day. The theatre was purchased in 1897 by a man by the name of Kawazoe Sadaji, who changed its name to Chitose-za (One Thousand Years Theatre), and sold it three years later. Kanamaru Genjirō thus obtained the theater in 1900, for 4500 yen, and renamed it once again, to the Kanamaru-za, a name which continues to be used today.

After falling into disuse for many years, and being used as a movie theater for some time, the theatre was designated an Important Cultural Property by the Agency for Cultural Affairs of the national government in 1970, after having been designated as such by the prefecture in 1953. Following a fund-raising drive which raised over US$2 million, the theatre was restored in 1976 to its Edo period appearance and moved some 200 meters to a new location.

In late June 1985, a troupe led by Nakamura Kichiemon II and Sawamura Sōjūrō IX performed the play Saikai Zakura Misome no Kiyomizu ("Reunion Amongst the Cherry Blossoms After the First Meeting at Kiyomizu") and dance drama Niwakajishi ("Spirited Lion"), at the Kanamaru-za, in a three-day stint following performances at the Naka-za in Osaka. Kichiemon was impressed with the theatre's atmosphere and traditional design and amenities, and encouraged other actors to journey to Kotohira. A month-long program has been produced every spring since, featuring major Tokyo/Osaka actors.

Much of the 1995 film Sharaku, set in 1790s Edo and revolving around the life of ukiyo-e artist Sharaku, was filmed at the Konpira Theatre, which stood in for the no longer extant Nakamura-za.

== Architecture ==
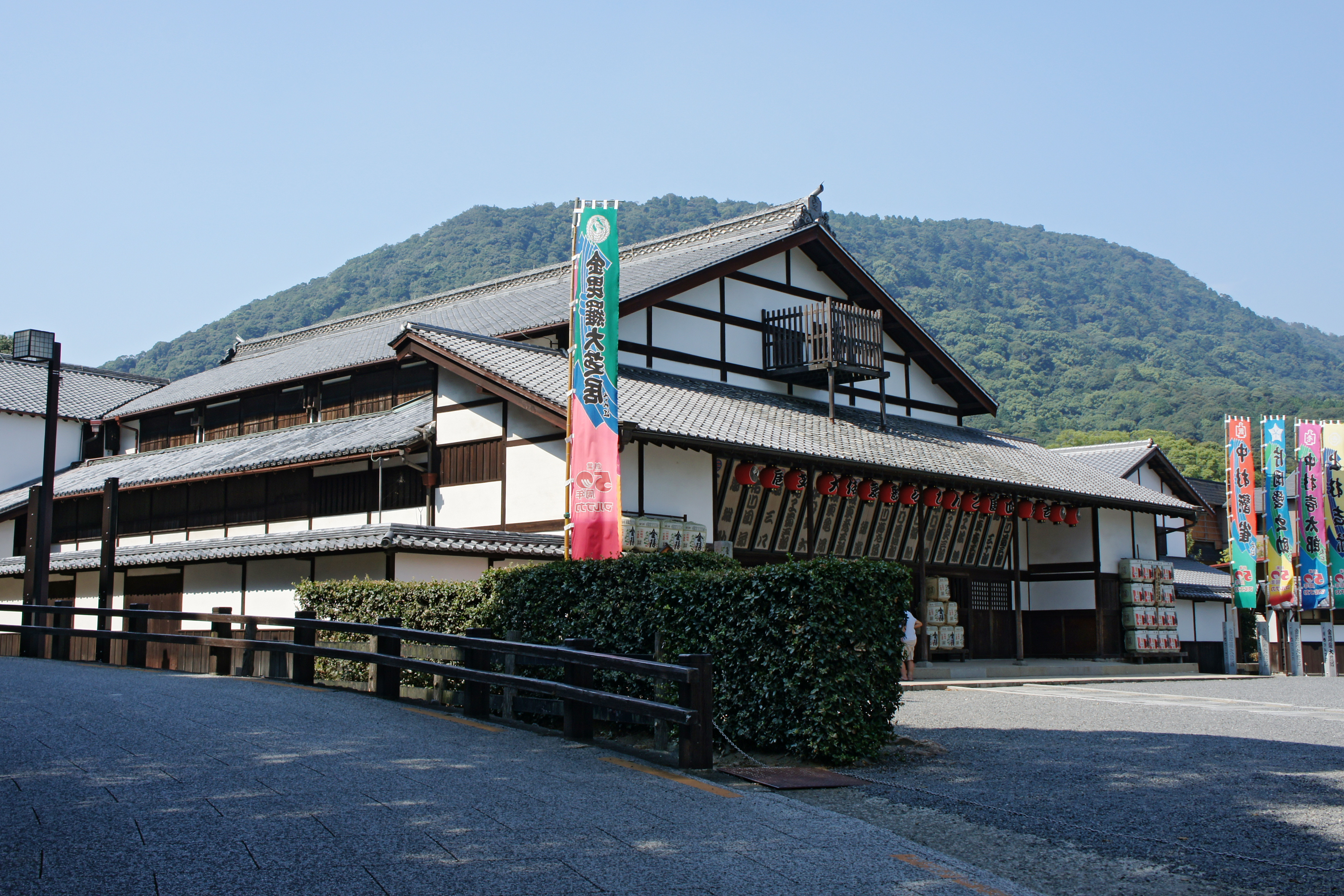
Exterior of the Konpira Grand theatre

The structure's frontage is about 80 feet long, or 13 ken and 2 shaku in the now no longer used traditional Japanese units of measurement. During the month when kabuki actors journey down from Tokyo or Kamigata (the Kyoto-Osaka area) and perform at the theatre, large banners bearing the crest of the Shōchiku company, and signboards with the stars' names are displayed. Fake bushels of rice, representing gifts from fans and sponsors, are also situated outside the theatre.

There are three entrances into the building. The ones on the left and right are of normal size, but the central entrance, called the "mouse door" (ねずみ木戸, nezumi kido), is quite small and requires one to crouch in order to enter. This was an effective form of crowd control in the Edo period, and, along with armed guards, helped prevent anyone from entering without a ticket. While the average commoner playgoer had to use this small nezumi kido, those associated with the Kanemitsu-in used the goyō kido on the right. The large ōkido on the left was used by members of the samurai class, and others of importance.

One of the primary features distinguishing the renovated Konpira Grand Theatre other kabuki theatres in Japan today, which are more modern in style, is the tatami floor in the main (orchestra section) seating section. Areas of seating for small parties are divided from one another by a grid of wooden planking, into box seats called masu; sitting this way allows greater range of motion for the viewer, and thus allows one to more easily turn to watch action on the hanamichi, the long stage extension which runs from the stage to the back of the theater. A raised tatami platform called the sajiki runs along the left side of the theatre on both the ground and second floors; these were traditionally the most expensive seats, and still are today. A similar section which runs along the right side of the theatre is called the demago, though traditionally this would have been called the takadoma in Edo.

Another distinguishing feature is the karaido, or "empty well", a space between the hanamichi and stage accessible from underneath by stairs; while most other theatres utilize an elevator trap called a suppon ("snapping turtle") to allow actors to enter directly onto the hanamichi, the stairs allow an actor to better time his entrance, for better dramatic effect. The Konpira Grand Theatre has a suppon as well, but scholar Samuel Leiter writes that he is unaware of another active theatre which uses a karaido. A second hanamichi, called the kari hanamichi and about half the width of the main hanamichi, runs through the theatre towards the right side; a connecting plank is sometimes used to allow actors to cross between the two hanamichi at some distance from the stage.

Much of the left and right walls of the seating area are composed of shōji panels, which can be slid like sliding doors to provide access to corridors which run outside the seating area. The outermost side walls of the theatre building, forming the opposite side of these corridors, consist of rain shutters known as madobuta ("window lids") or akarimado ("lighting windows") which can be raised and lowered by stagehands to let the sunlight in and control the lighting of the theatre, in order to create atmospheric effects, such as a dark and spooky atmosphere for certain elements of ghost plays.

There are areas for musicians on both stage left and right, along with a second-story room above stage left, called the yuka, used specifically by tayū (narrative chanters) and shamisen players heard in plays deriving from the jōruri puppet theatre. This is in contrast to the theatres of Tokyo and Kamigata, which traditionally have boxes for the musicians on only one side of the stage (stage right and left respectively). The stage itself is about half the width of that in the modern theatres; while the stage opening at Kabuki-za in Tokyo is nearly ninety feet wide, the space between the supporting pillars at the Kanamaru-za is eight ken, or roughly 48 feet; Leiter calls the larger scale of the more modern theatres a loss and an artistic weakening, as theatres moved "away from the most effective means for expressing theatrical art."

The Kanamaru-za also boasts a manually operated rotating stage (mawari butai) and trap doors (seri), though the "hell" (naraku) area underneath the stage from which these were operated was considered by many actors so unpleasant that it would often be avoided in favor of the corridors outside the sajiki (along the sides of the theatre) as a means for traveling around the theatre.
