= Awashima Island, Kagawa =

Island in Seto Inland Sea, Japan

Awashima
Native name: 粟島
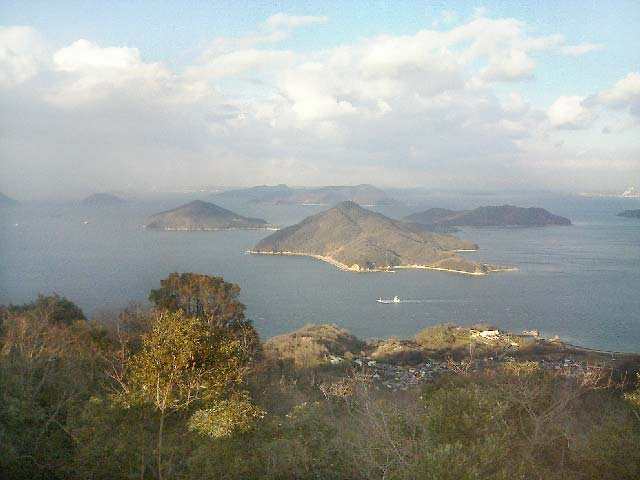
- View of Awashima from the southwest. Taken from Mt. Shiude

- Location within Kagawa Prefecture Location within Japan

Geography
- Location: Seto Inland Sea
- Coordinates: 34.271°N 133.633°E
- Archipelago: Shiwaku Islands
- Area: 3.72 km^{2} (1.44 sq mi)
- Highest elevation: 222.08 m (728.61 ft)
- Highest point: Mt Shiroyama

Administration
- Japan
- Prefecture: Kagawa Prefecture
- City: Mitoyo

Awashima (粟島) is an inhabited island in the Seto Inland Sea of Japan, about 4.5 km northwest of the port of Takuma in the city of Mitoyo, Kagawa Prefecture. The total area is 3.72 km^{2} with a population of 216 (as of 2015). The island was the site of a maritime school that operated from 1897 to 1987, now preserved as a museum. The former post office is the site of the Missing Post Office.

== See also ==
- Vargula hilgendorfii
