= Ōnohara, Kagawa =

Dissolved municipality in Kagawa prefecture, Japan

Ōnohara (大野原町, Ōnohara-chō) was a town located in Mitoyo District, Kagawa Prefecture, Japan.

As of 2003, the town had an estimated population of 12,851 and a population density of 248.76 persons per km^{2}. The total area was 51.66 km^{2}.

On October 11, 2005, Ōnohara, along with the town of Toyohama (also from Mitoyo District), was merged to create the city of Kan'onji and no longer exists as an independent municipality.

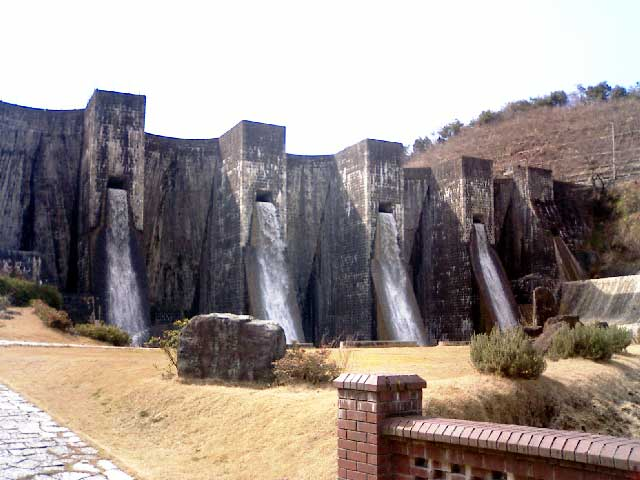
Honenike Dam

Structures of interest in Ōnohara include Honenike Dam, a multiple-arch dam completed in 1930.
