= Takase, Kagawa =

Takase 高瀬町
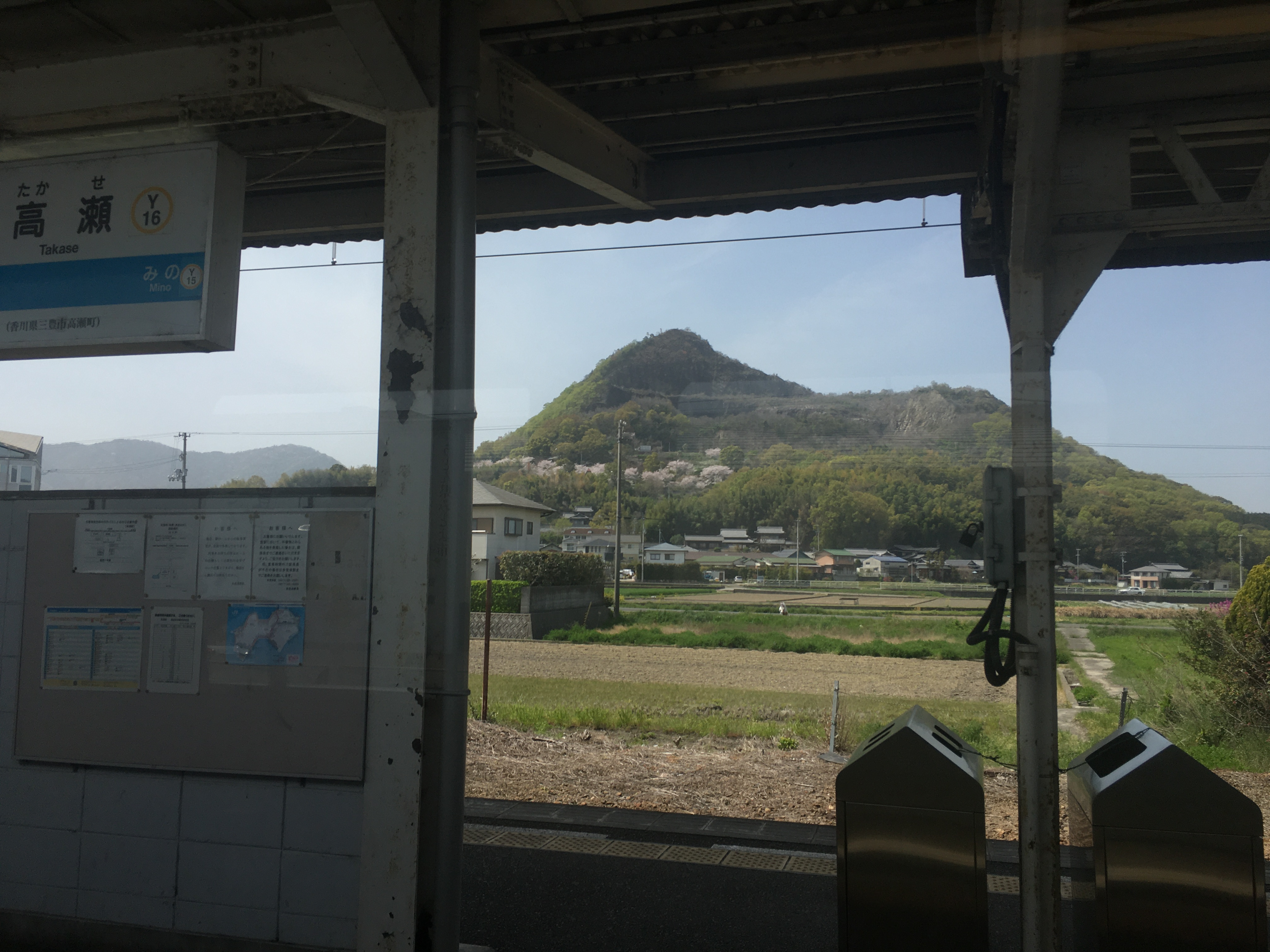
- Mount Tokami from Takase Station

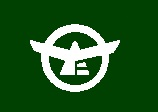
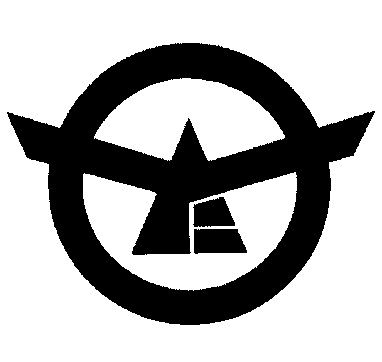
- Flag Emblem

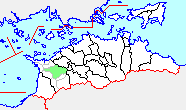
- Location of Takase in Mitoyo

- Location in Japan
- Coordinates: 34°10′57.2″N 133°42′54.7″E
- Country: Japan
- Region: Shikoku
- Prefecture: Kagawa
- City: Mitoyo
- Now part of Mitoyo: January 1, 2006

Area
  - Total: 56.36 km^{2} (21.76 sq mi)

Population (January 1, 2019)
  - Total: 15,294
  - Density: 271.4/km^{2} (702.8/sq mi)
- Time zone: UTC+09:00 (JST)
- Postal code: 767
- Area code: 0875
- Tree: Tea plant
- Flower: Sakura
- Climate: Cfa
- Website: Official website

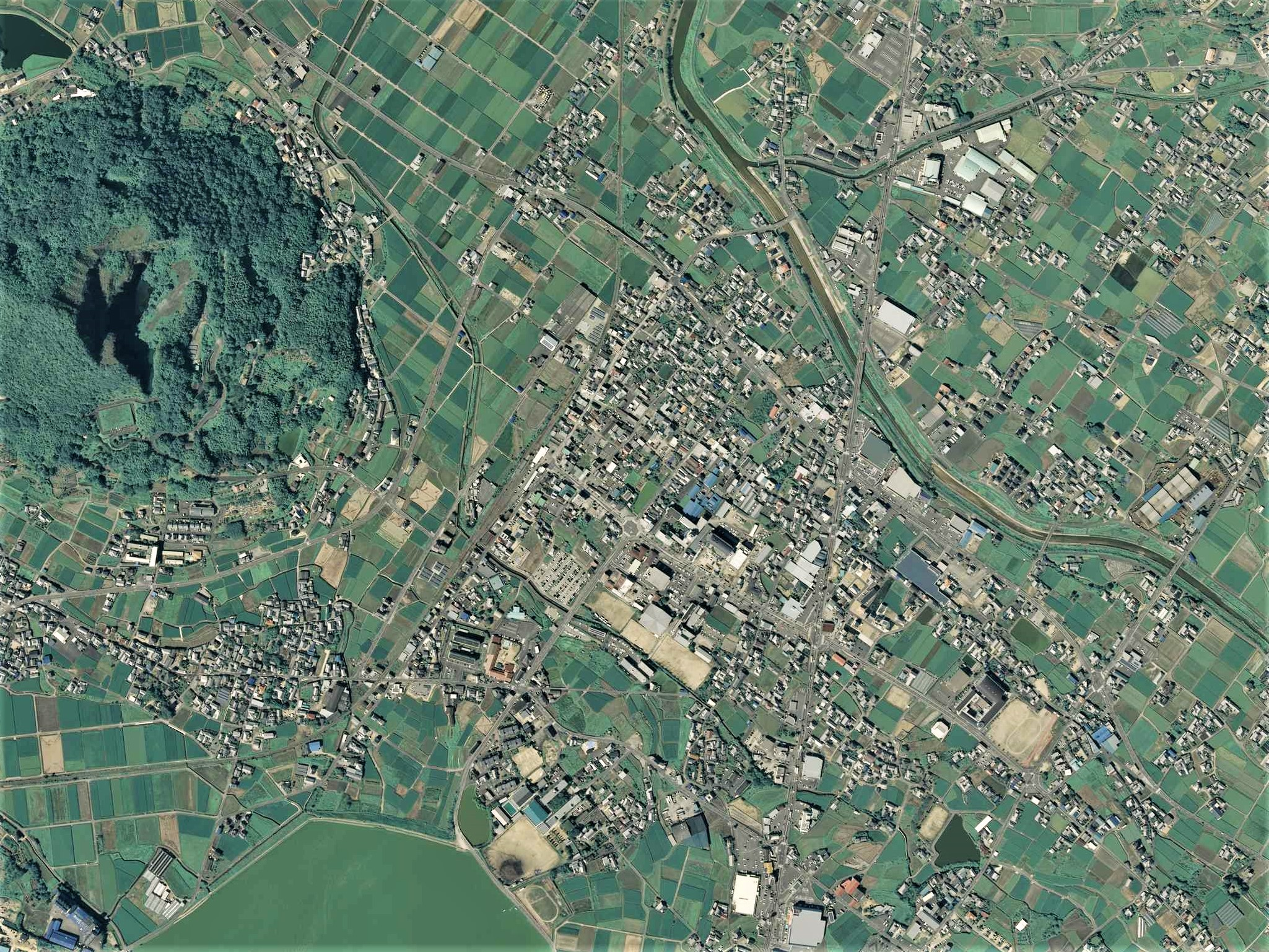
Aerial view of the Takase area of Mitoyo

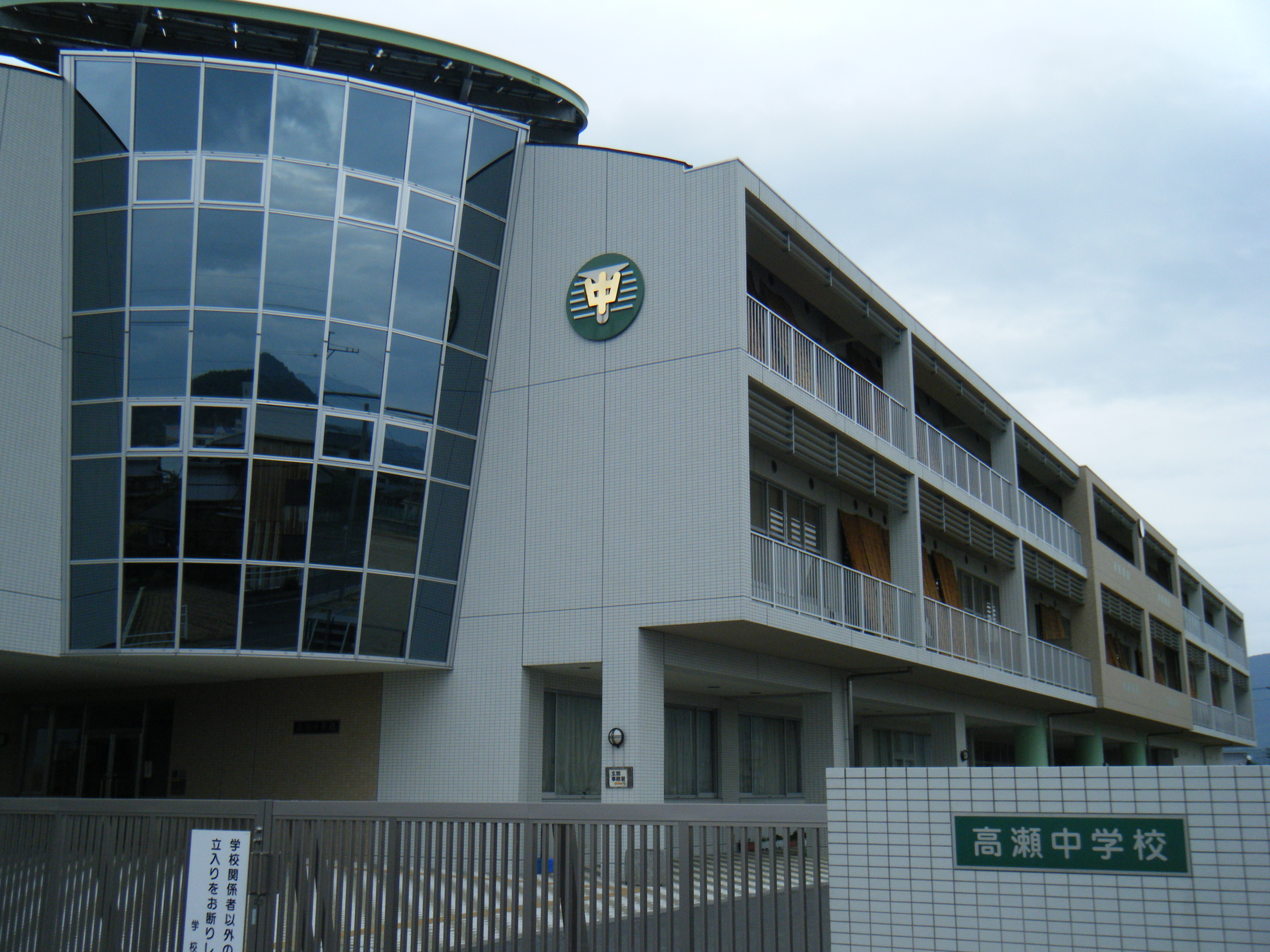
Takase Junior High School

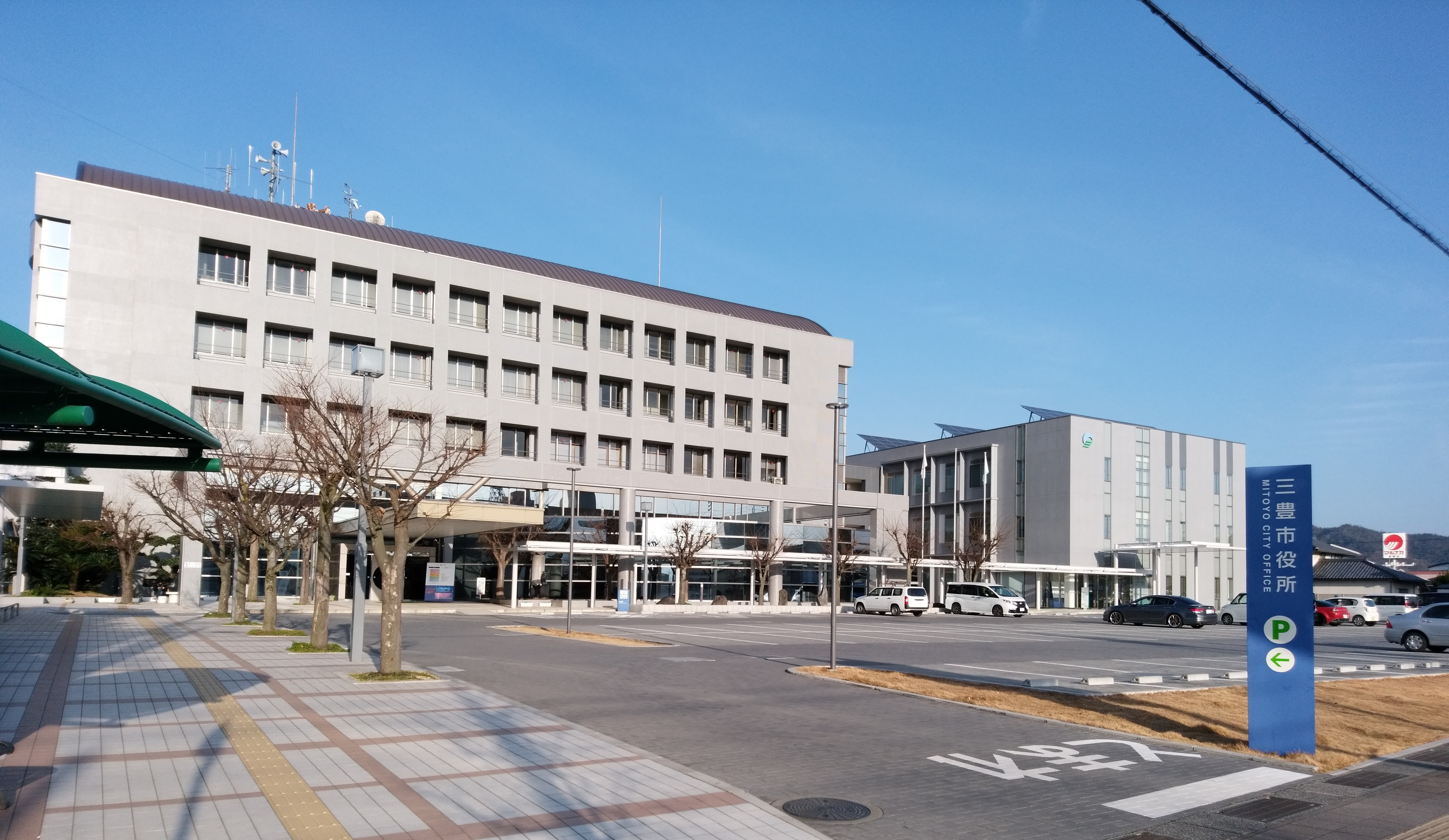
Mitoyo City Hall

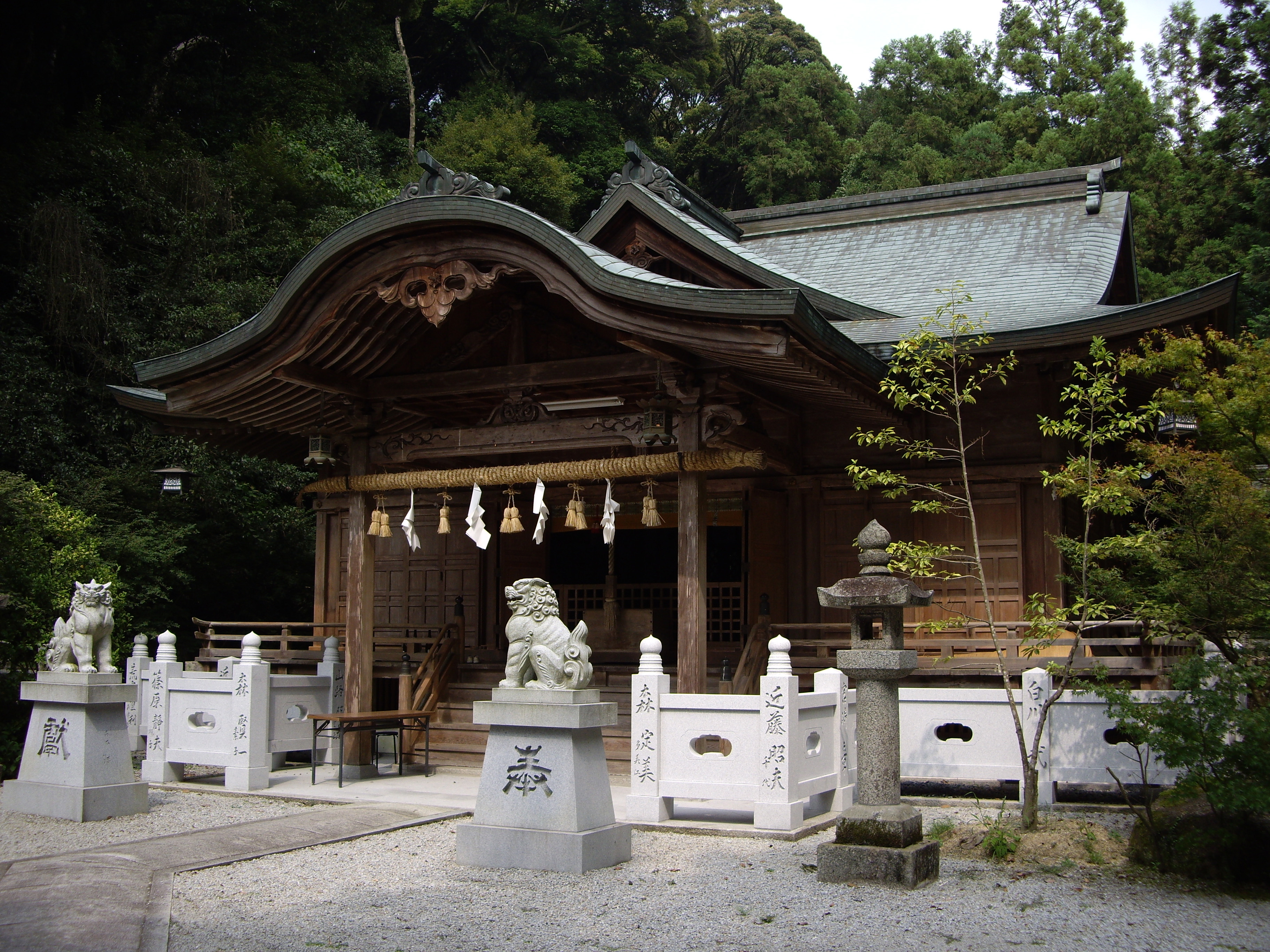
Ōminakami Shrine

Takase (高瀬町, Takase-chō) is a former town located in Mitoyo, Kagawa Prefecture, Japan. As of 2019, the area had an estimated population of 15,294 in 6,048 households and a population density of 271 persons per km^{2}. The total area is 56.36 km^{2}.

On January 1, 2006, Takase merged with the towns of Mino, Nio, Saita, Takuma, Toyonaka and Yamamoto (all from Mitoyo District) to create the current city of Mitoyo and no longer exists as an independent municipality.

== Geography ==
Takase is located in Mitoyo in western Kagawa Prefecture. It borders Mino to the north, Nio to the northwest, Toyonaka to the west, Yamamoto to the south, Chūnan and Kotohira to the southeast, and Zentsūji to the northeast.

The area contains several natural landforms, including Takase River (高瀬川, Takasegawa), Kuniichi Pond (国市池, Kuniichiike), Iwase Pond (岩瀬池, Iwaseike), and the following mountains.

- Mount Ōsa (大麻山, Ōsayama)
- Mount Kotohira (琴平山, Kotohirayama) (also known as Mount Konpira (金毘羅山, Konpirasan)
- Mount Hiage (火上山, Hiagezan)
- Mount Tōbu (東部山, Tōbuyama)
- Mount Katamuki (傾山, Katamukiyama)
- Mount Asahi (朝日山, Asahiyama)
- Mount Ki (城山, Kiyama)
- Mount Tokami (爺神山, Tokamiyama), one of the Sanuki Seven Fuji (讃岐七富士, Sanukinanafuji)
- Mount Onigausu (鬼ヶ臼山, Onigausuyama)
- Mount Mayu (眉山, Mayuyama)
- Mount Yamajō (山条山, Yamajōyama)
- Mount Torigoe (鳥越山, Torigoeyama)
- Mount Jin (陣山, Jinyama)

=== Neighboring areas ===
Within Mitoyo

- Mino
- Nio
- Toyonaka
- Yamamoto

Outside Mitoyo

- Kotohira
- Chūnan
- Zentsūji

== History ==
On March 31, 1955, the five villages located near Takase River - Kamitakase, Katsuma, Hijifuta, Ninomiya, and Asa - merged to become the town of Takase.

On January 1, 2006, the town of Takase, along with the neighboring towns of Nio, Saita, Toyonaka, Yamamoto, Takuma, and Mino, merged to form the city of Mitoyo.

=== The Great Shōwa Merger ===
The following three proposals were considered for the merger of 1955.

- An eight village merger consisting of the villages of Kamitakase, Katsuma, Hijifuta, Ninomiya, Asa, Yoshizu, Ōmi, and Shimokatsuma
- A five village merger consisting of the villages of Kamitakase, Katsuma, Hijifuta, Ninomiya, and Asa (the merger that was implemented)
- A three village merger consisting of the villages of Kamitakase, Katsuma, and Hijifuta

The schools and such of the villages of Kamitakase, Katsuma, and Hijifuta were closely related, so their merger went relatively smoothly. The villages of Ninomiya, Asa, Yoshizu, Ōmi, and Shimotakase, however, had room to consider other frameworks, so the merger had to wait for their decision to be made. Ultimately, the villages of Yoshizu, Ōmi, and Shimotakase merged to form the town of Mino, and the villages of Ninomiya and Asa joined the framework for the town of Takase, creating the town of Takase from the merging of the five villages.

== Economy ==
Takase is known for its agriculture, especially its green tea, onions, peaches, and grapes (New Pione variety).

== Education ==
Takase has five public elementary schools and one public middle school operated by the Mitoyo city government. It also has one public high school operated by the Kagawa Prefectural Board of Education, as well as one private high school and one vocational school, both affiliated with Shikoku Gakuin University.

=== Elementary Schools ===
- Katsuma Elementary School
- Kamitakase Elementary School
- Ninomiya Elementary School
- Asa Elementary School
- Hiji Elementary School

=== Middle Schools ===
- Takase Junior High School

=== High Schools ===
- Takase High School
- Kagawa Nishi High School, Shikoku Gakuin University

=== Vocational Schools ===
- Shikoku Gakuin University Vocational School

== Public institutions ==
Takase has one major medical institution, the city-funded Mitoyo Nishikawa Hospital. It is also the location of Mitoyo City Hall and the Mitoyo Police Station.

== Transportation ==
=== Railways ===
Shikoku Railway Company - Yosan Line

- Takase

=== Buses ===
Mitoyo City Community Bus

=== Expressways and highways ===
- Takamatsu Expressway (Takase Parking Area)
- National Route 11
- National Route 377

=== Prefectural roadways ===
==== Main local roadways ====
- Kagawa Prefectural Route 23, Takuma-Kotohira Line
- Kagawa Prefectural Route 24, Zentsūji-Ōnohara Line
- Kagawa Prefectural Route 35, Toyonaka-Mino Line
- Kagawa Prefectural Route 49, Kan’onji-Zentsūji Line

==== Common roadways ====
- Kagawa Prefectural Route 218, Saita-Kamitakase Line
- Kagawa Prefectural Route 219, Kanda-Takase Line
- Kagawa Prefectural Route 221, Miyao-Takase Line
- Kagawa Prefectural Route 222, Shimotakase-Takase Line
- Kagawa Prefectural Route 224, Okamoto-Takase Line
- Kagawa Prefectural Route 225, Hagata-Toyonaka Line

== Sister cities ==
- Hapcheon County, South Gyeongsang, South Korea - Sister city since July 13, 1996

== Local attractions ==
- Takase Natural Hot Spring
- Mount Asahi Forest Park
  - Mount Asahi Forest Park Folk Museum
- Tokami Park, located on Mount Tokami
- Ōminakami Shrine
- Ninomiya Kiln ruins

== Notable people from Takase ==
- Kinujirō Ishī, founder of Taisho Pharmaceutical Co., Ltd.
- Kimiyo Kurimoto (maiden name: Matsuzaki), former World Table Tennis Champion
