= Chichibugahama Beach =

Beach in Mitoyo, Japan

Coordinates: 34.189°N 133.649°E

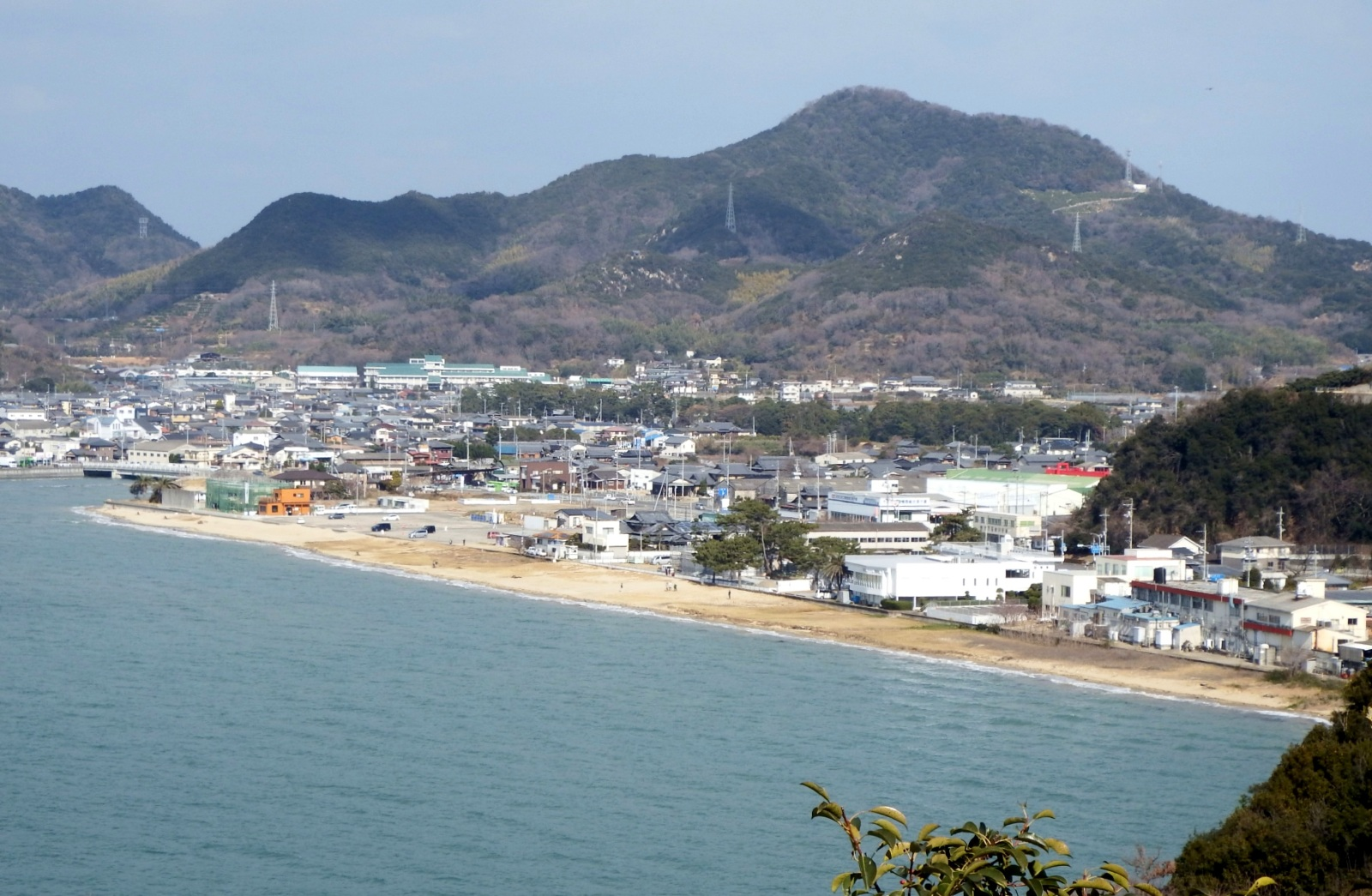
Beach as seen from offshore

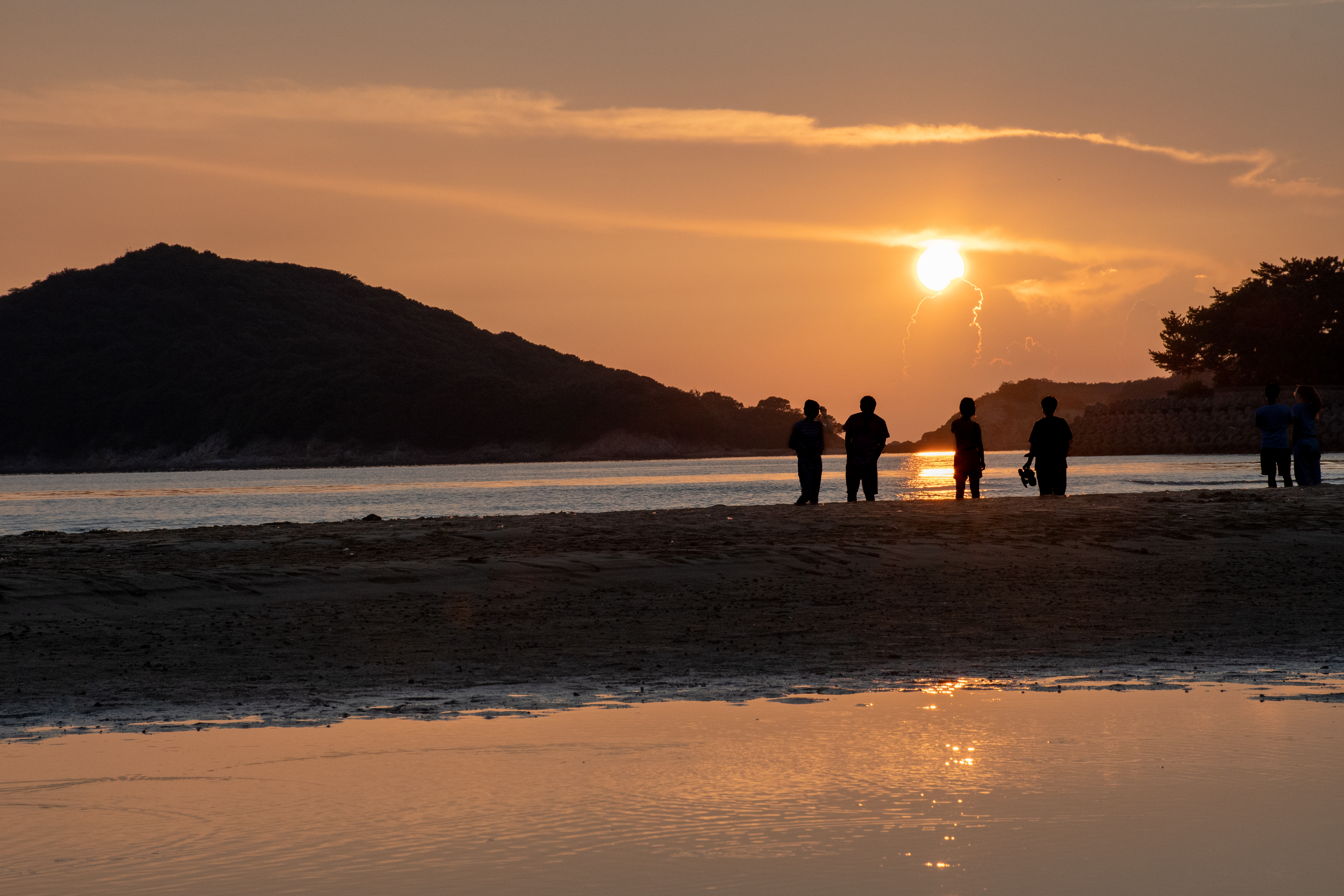
Beach at sunset

Chichibugahama Beach (父母ヶ浜) is a scenic beach in the city of Mitoyo, Kagawa Prefecture, Japan. It is renowned for its beauty and is listed as among "the planet's most spiritual places", and one of the 100 best sunsets in Japan. Japan National Tourism Organization says that the beach's renown for sunset photography is due to Seto-no-yunagi, a lull in the evening winds around Seto Inland Sea when the tide pools become mirror-like.

Traffic to Mitoyo's city website grew more than 40,000 pageviews when instructions for taking sunset pictures for social media were posted in April 2017.
