= Saita, Kagawa =

Dissolved municipality in Kagawa Prefecture, Japan

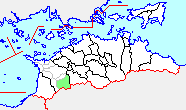

Saita (財田町, Saita-chō) was a town located in Mitoyo District, Kagawa Prefecture, Japan.

As of 2003, the town had an estimated population of 4,621 and a density of 97.99 persons per km^{2}. The total area was 47.16 km^{2}.

On January 1, 2006, Saita, along with the towns of Mino, Nio, Takase, Takuma, Toyonaka and Yamamoto (all from Mitoyo District), was merger to create the city of Mitoyo and no longer exists as an independent municipality.
