= Toyonaka, Kagawa =

Town in Kagawa Prefecture, Japan

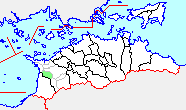

Toyonaka (豊中町, Toyonaka-chō) was a town located in Mitoyo District, Kagawa Prefecture, Japan.

As of 2003, the town had an estimated population of 11,684 and a density of 586.84 persons per km^{2}. The total area was 19.91 km^{2}.

On January 1, 2006, Toyonaka, along with the towns of Mino, Nio, Saita, Takase, Takuma and Yamamoto (all from Mitoyo District), was merged to create the city of Mitoyo and no longer exists as an independent municipality.
