= Toyohama, Kagawa =

Dissolved municipality in Kagawa prefecture, Japan

Toyohama (豊浜町, Toyohama-chō) was a town in Mitoyo District, Kagawa Prefecture, Japan.

As of 2003, the town had an estimated population of 8,774 and a density of 525.70 persons per km^{2}. The total area was 16.69 km^{2}.

On October 11, 2005, Toyohama, along with the town of Ōnohara (also from Mitoyo District), was merged to create the city of Kan'onji and no longer exists as an independent municipality.
