= Hōnen'ike Dam =

Coordinates: 34°02′31″N 133°41′05″E

Hōnenike Dam
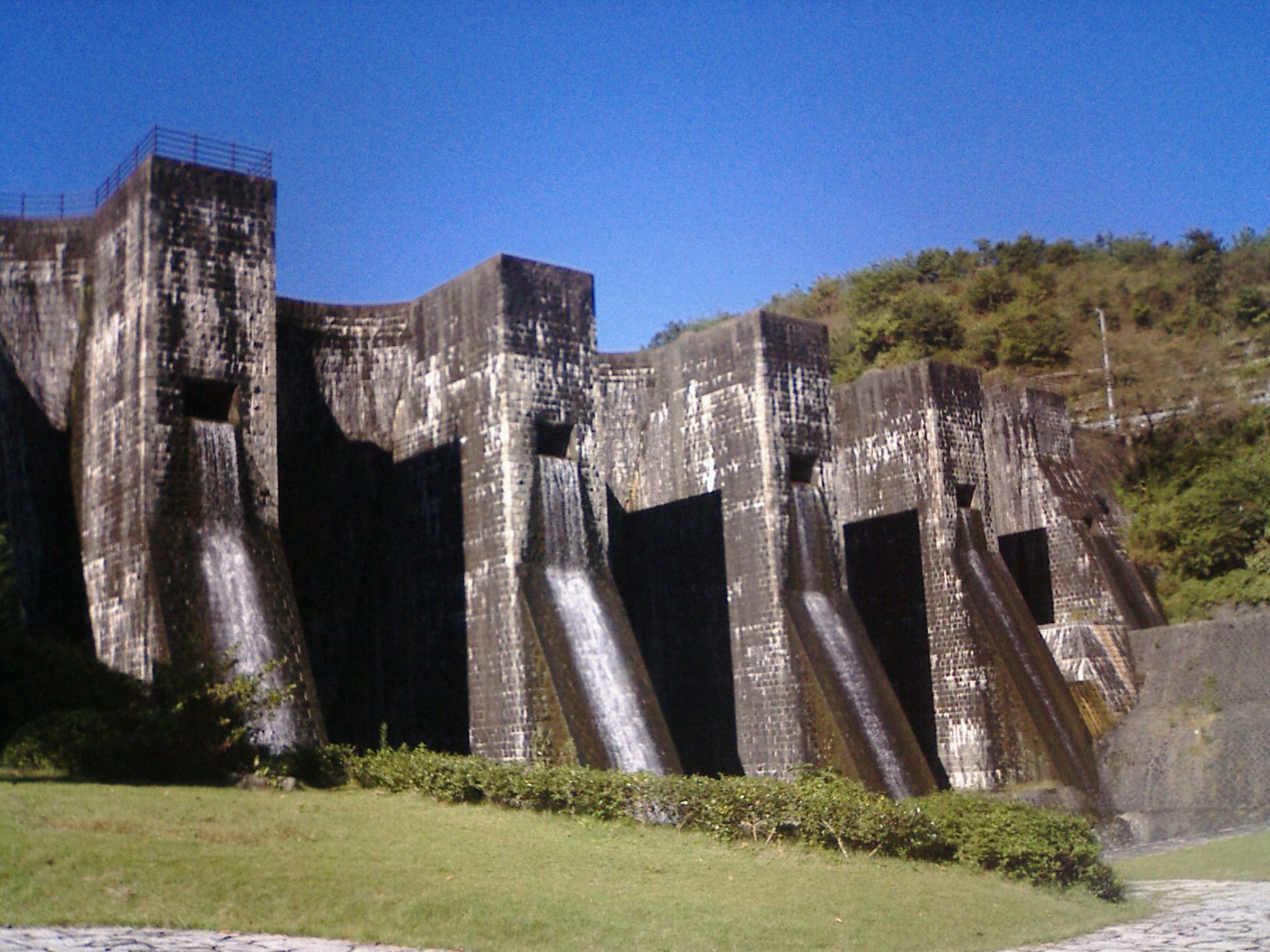
- Interactive map of Hōnenike Dam
- Location: Kan'onji, Kagawa, Japan
- Construction began: 1926
- Opening date: 1930

Dam and spillways
- Type of dam: Multi-arch
- Height: 32 m (105 ft)
- Length: 158 m (518 ft)
- Dam volume: 21,000 m^{3}

Reservoir
- Total capacity: 1,590,000 m^{3}
- Catchment area: 9.9 km^{2}
- Surface area: 16 ha

Hōnen'ike Dam (豊稔池ダム, Hōnen'ike damu) is a multiple-arch dam in the Sanuki Mountain range at Kan'onji, Kagawa Prefecture, Japan. The reservoir it creates is used for irrigation. Construction began in 1926 and was completed in 1930. The dam is 32 m high and has a crest length of 158 m. It is supported by six arched buttresses. Some renovation work has been needed to control leakage; special care has been taken due to its status as a cultural asset.

The dam has been designated an Important Cultural Property by the Japanese Ministry of Culture.
