= Nio, Kagawa =

Dissolved municipality in Kagawa prefecture, Japan

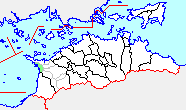

Nio (仁尾町, Nio-chō) was a town located in Mitoyo District, Kagawa Prefecture, Japan.

As of 2003, the town had an estimated population of 6,896 and a density of 445.19 persons per km^{2}. The total area was 15.49 km^{2}.

On January 1, 2006, Nio, along with the towns of Mino, Saita, Takase, Takuma, Toyonaka and Yamamoto (all from Mitoyo District), was merger to create the city of Mitoyo and no longer exists as an independent municipality.

Nio had a sister city relationship with Waupaca, Wisconsin.
