= Toyota District (Sanuki Province) =

Former district in Kagawa prefecture, Japan

Toyota District (豊田郡, Toyota-gun) is a former district located in the former Sanuki Province (now Kagawa Prefecture), Japan. Former names for Toyota include Katta District (刈田郡, Katta-gun) and Karita District (苅田郡, Karita-gun). From the Meiji period onward, it was part of Kagawa Prefecture. Toyota District was dissolved by being incorporated into the neighboring Mitoyo District.
