= Takuma, Kagawa =

Dissolved municipality in Kagawa Prefecture, Japan

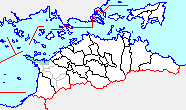

Takuma (詫間町, Takuma-chō) was a town located in Mitoyo District, Kagawa Prefecture, Japan.

As of 2003, the town had an estimated population of 15,179 and a density of 488.23 persons per km^{2}. The total area was 31.09 km^{2}.

On January 1, 2006, Takuma, along with the towns of Mino, Nio, Saita, Takase, Toyonaka and Yamamoto (all from Mitoyo District), was merged to create the city of Mitoyo and no longer exists as an independent municipality.
