= Kotohira, Kagawa =

Town in Kagawa Prefecture, Japan

Kotohira 琴平町
- Town
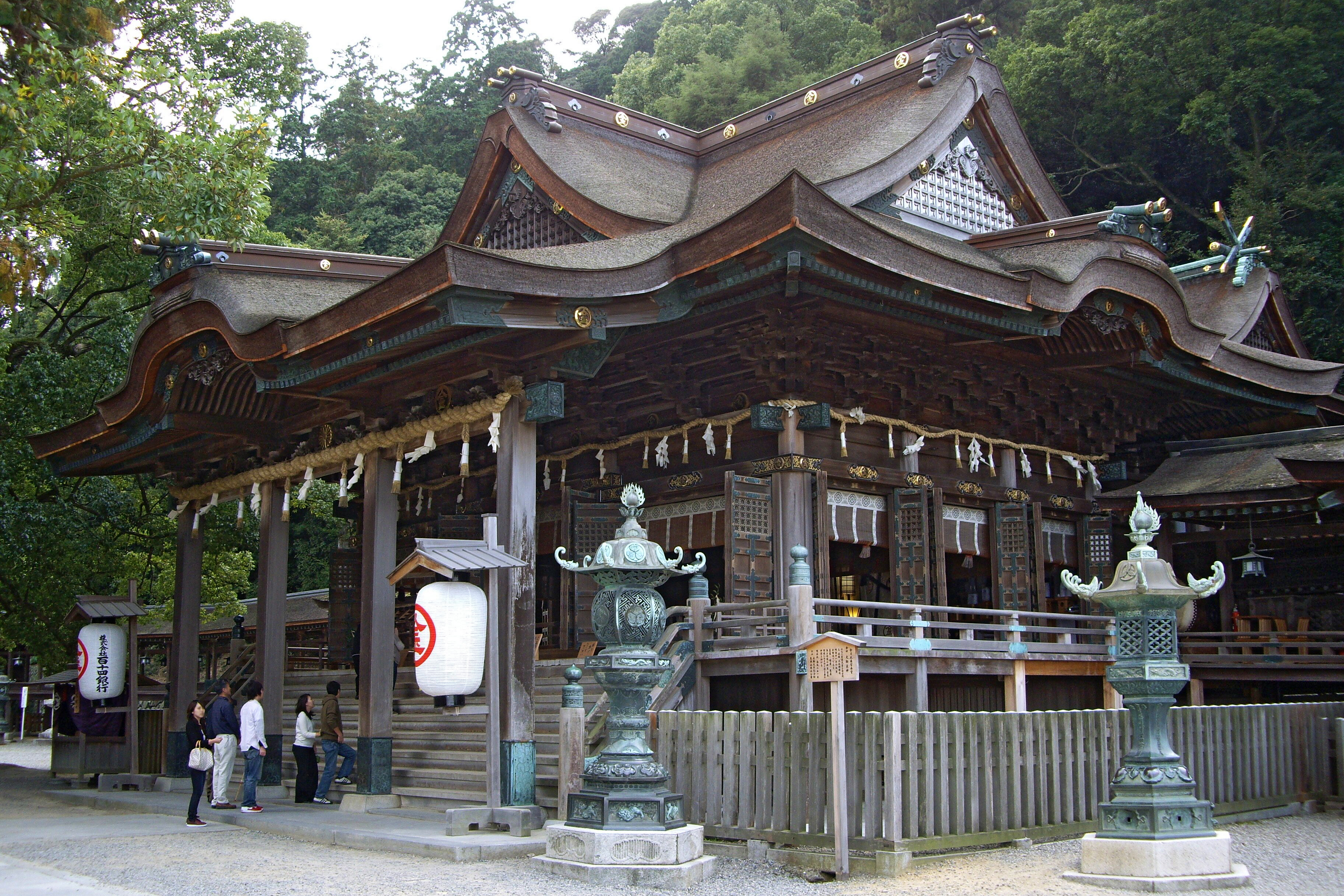
- Kotohira Shrine

- Flag Emblem
- Interactive map of Kotohira
- Location in Japan
- Coordinates: 34°12′07″N 133°49′36″E
- Country: Japan
- Region: Shikoku
- Prefecture: Kagawa
- District: Nakatado

Government
  - Mayor: Hideki Kataoka

Area
  - Total: 8.47 km^{2} (3.27 sq mi)

Population (September 30, 2022)
  - Total: 8,105
  - Density: 957/km^{2} (2,480/sq mi)
- Time zone: UTC+09:00 (JST)
- City hall address: 817-10 Enokii, Kotohira-chō, Nakatado-gun, Kagawa-ken 985-8501
- Website: Official website
- Symbols
- Flower: Michelsa compressa
- Tree: Cherry blossom

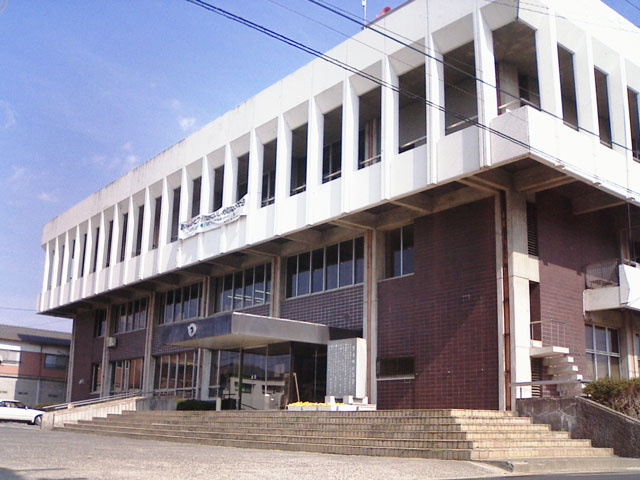
Kotohira Town Hall

Kotohira (琴平町, Kotohira-chō) is a town located in Nakatado District, Kagawa Prefecture, Japan. As of 1 October 2022, the town had an estimated population of 8,105 in 3618 households and a population density of 960 persons per km^{2}. The total area of the town is 8.47 square kilometres (3.27 sq mi). The town is best known as the site of Shikoku's largest shrine complex, the Kotohira Shrine (popularly known as Konpira-san).

== Geography ==
Kotohira is located in southwestern Kagawa Prefecture. The west side of the town area runs along the foot of Mt.Kotohira

=== Neighbouring municipalities ===
Kagawa Prefecture

- Mannō
- Mitoyo
- Zentsūji

=== Climate ===
Kotohira has a humid subtropical climate (Köppen Cfa) characterized by warm summers and cool winters with light snowfall. The average annual temperature in Kotohira is 15.1 °C. The average annual rainfall is 1439 mm with September as the wettest month. The temperatures are highest on average in January, at around 26.2 °C, and lowest in January, at around 4.7 °C.

== Demographics ==
Per Japanese census data, the population of Kotohira has been declining steadily since the 1960s.

Historical population
Year	Pop.	±%
1960	14,839	—
1970	14,324	−3.5%
1980	13,807	−3.6%
1990	12,632	−8.5%
2000	11,335	−10.3%
2010	9,967	−12.1%
2020	8,468	−15.0%

== History ==
The area of Kotohira was part of ancient Sanuki Province. The town developed as a market before the gates of the Kotohira Shrine, which has attracted pilgrims since prehistoric times. During the Edo Period, the area was tenryō territory ruled directly by the Tokugawa shogunate. Following the Meiji restoration, the town of Kotohira was established with the creation of the modern municipalities system on February 15, 1890. Kotohira annexed the village of Enai on April 1,1955.

== Government ==
Kotohira has a mayor-council form of government with a directly elected mayor and a unicameral town council of 10 members. Kotohira, together with Mannō, contributes two members to the Kagawa Prefectural Assembly. In terms of national politics, the town is part of Kagawa 3rd district of the lower house of the Diet of Japan.

== Economy ==
As the monzenmachi of the Korohira Shrine, the local economy is heavily centered on tourism.

== Education ==
Kotohira has three public elementary schools and one public middle school operated by the town government, and one public high schools operated by the Kagawa Prefectural Board of Education.

== Transportation ==
=== Railways ===
Shikoku Railway Company - Dosan Line

- Kotohira

Takamatsu-Kotohira Electric Railroad Kotoden Kotohira Line

- Enai - Kotoden-Kotohira

=== Highways ===
- National Route 319
- National Route 377

== Local attractions ==
- Kanamaru-za, Japan's oldest surviving Kabuki playhouse.
- Kotohira Shrine
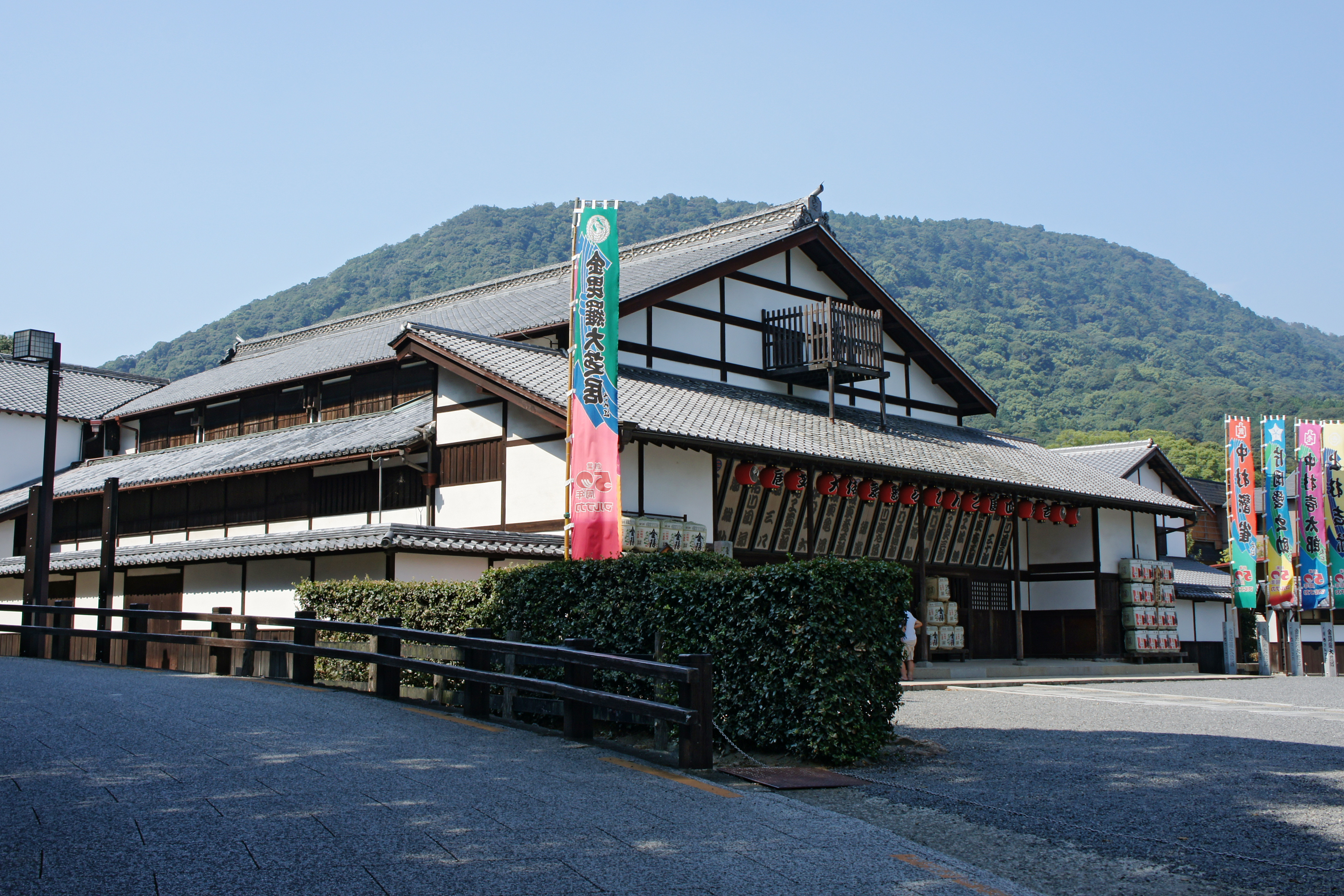
Kanamaru-za (Kabuki theatre)

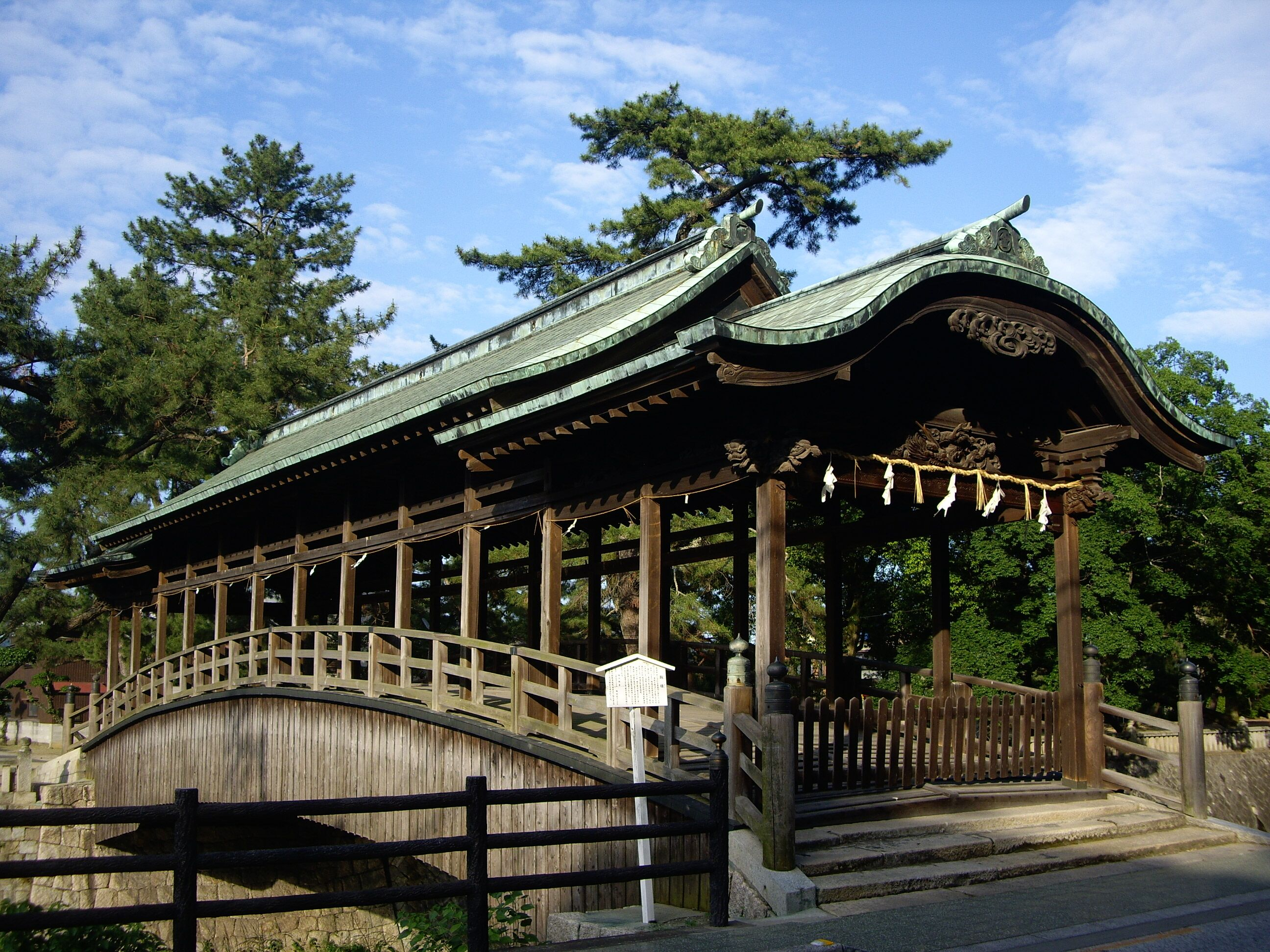
Saya Bridge (Covered bridge)

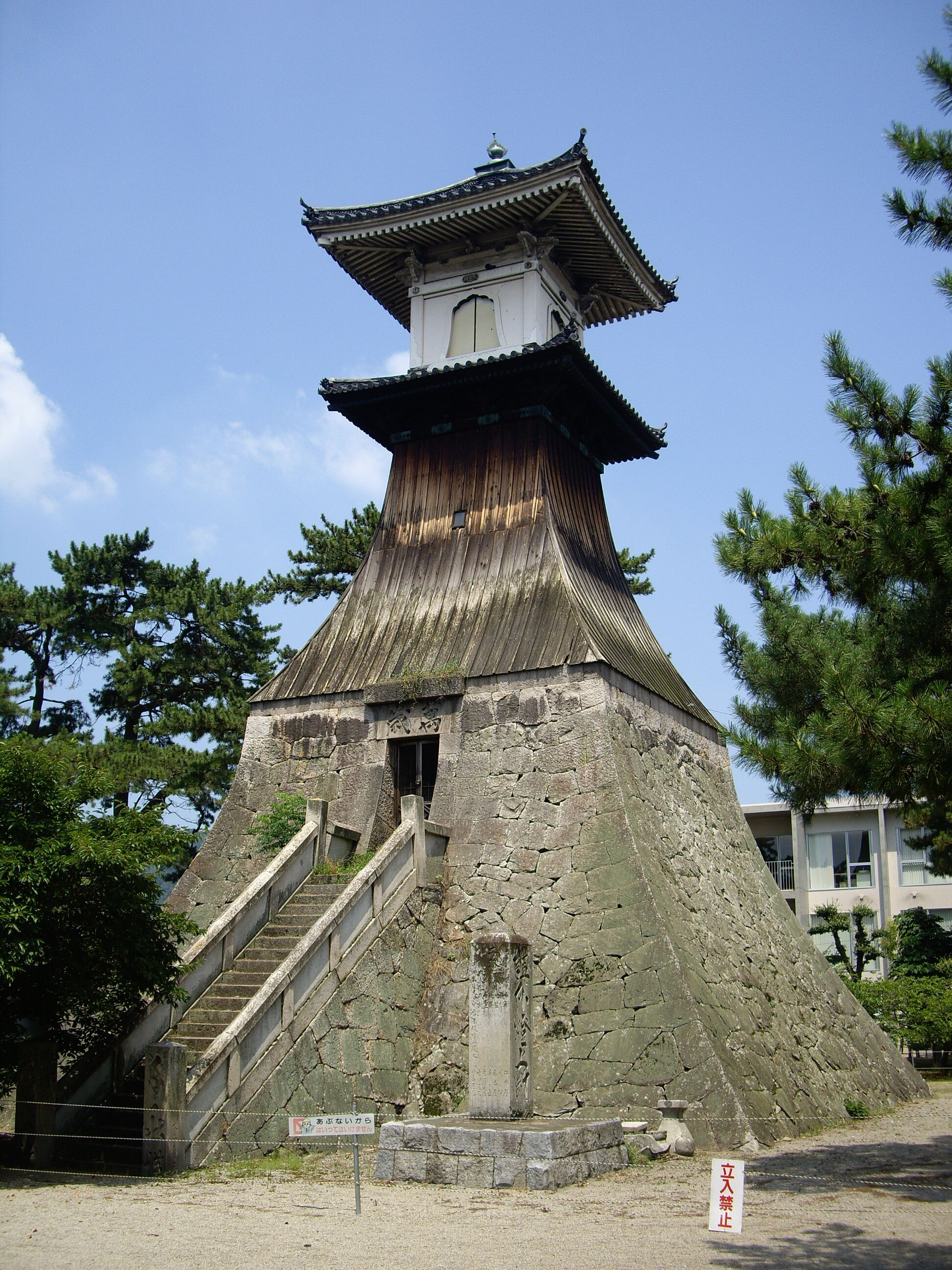
TakaTōrō (Tōrō)
