= Mitoyo District =

Former district in Kagawa prefecture, Japan

Mitoyo (三豊郡, Mitoyo-gun) was a district located in Kagawa Prefecture, Japan.

As of 2003, the district had an estimated population of 93,984 and a density of 322.96 persons per km^{2}. The total area was 291.01 km^{2}.

== Mergers ==
- Mitoyo District was created by the merger of two separate districts, (三野郡) Mino-gun and (豊田郡) Toyota-gun in 1899.
- On October 11, 2005 - the towns of Ōnohara and Toyohama merged to form the city of Kan'onji.
- On January 1, 2006 - the towns of Mino, Nio, Saita, Takase, Takuma, Toyonaka and Yamamoto were merged to create the city of Mitoyo. Mitoyo District was dissolved as a result of this merger. (Merger Information Page in Japanese)
