= Mitoyo =

Mitoyo 三豊市
- City
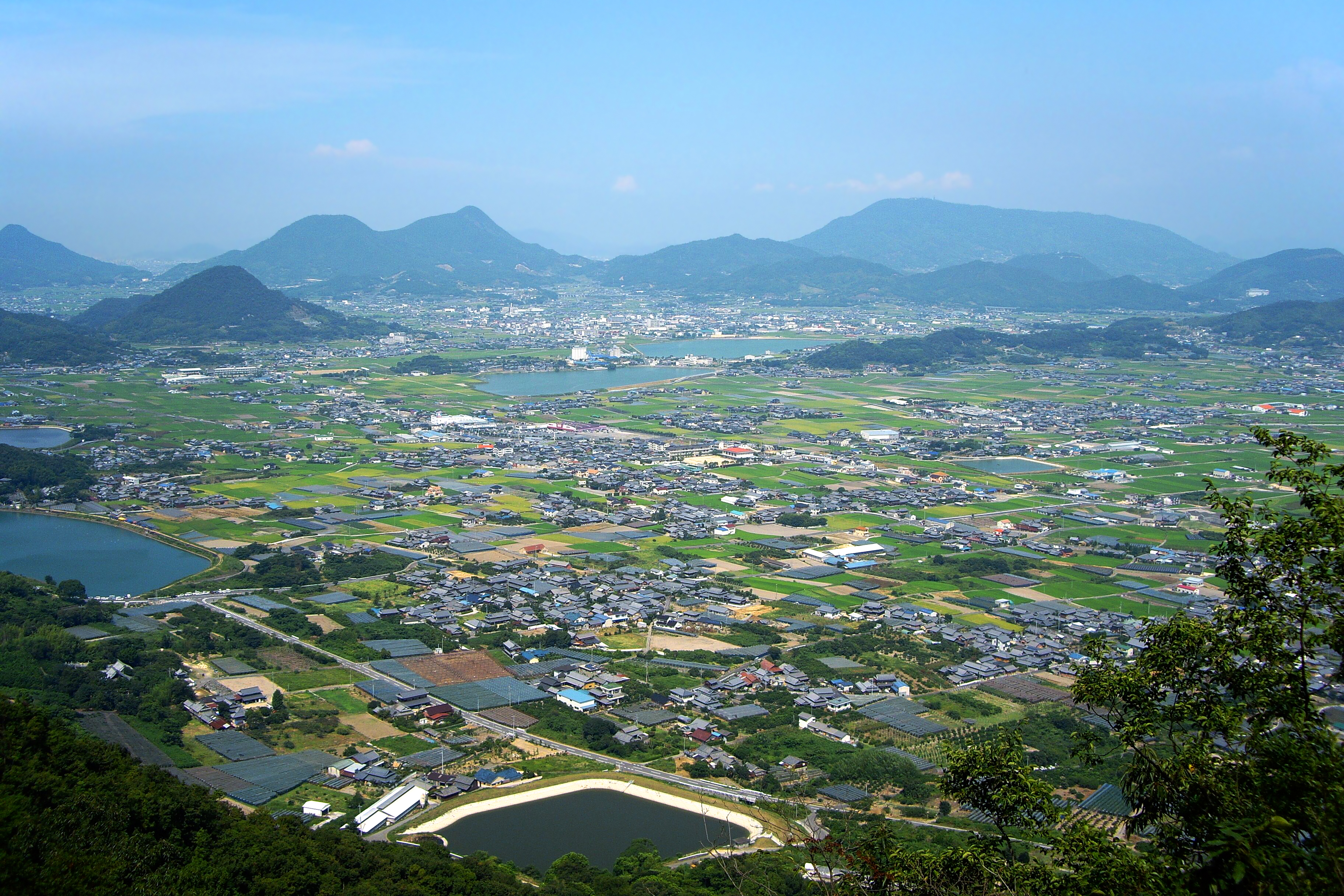
- Mitoyo Plain

- Flag Emblem
- Interactive map of Mitoyo
- Location in Japan
- Coordinates: 34°10′57″N 133°42′54″E
- Country: Japan
- Region: Shikoku
- Prefecture: Kagawa

Government
  - Mayor: Akishi Yamashita

Area
  - Total: 222.73 km^{2} (86.00 sq mi)

Population (September 31, 2022)
  - Total: 59,876
  - Density: 268.83/km^{2} (696.26/sq mi)
- Time zone: UTC+09:00 (JST)
- City hall address: 2373 Shimokatsuma, Takase-cho, Mitoyo-shi, Kagawa-ken 767-8585
- Climate: Cfa
- Website: Official website

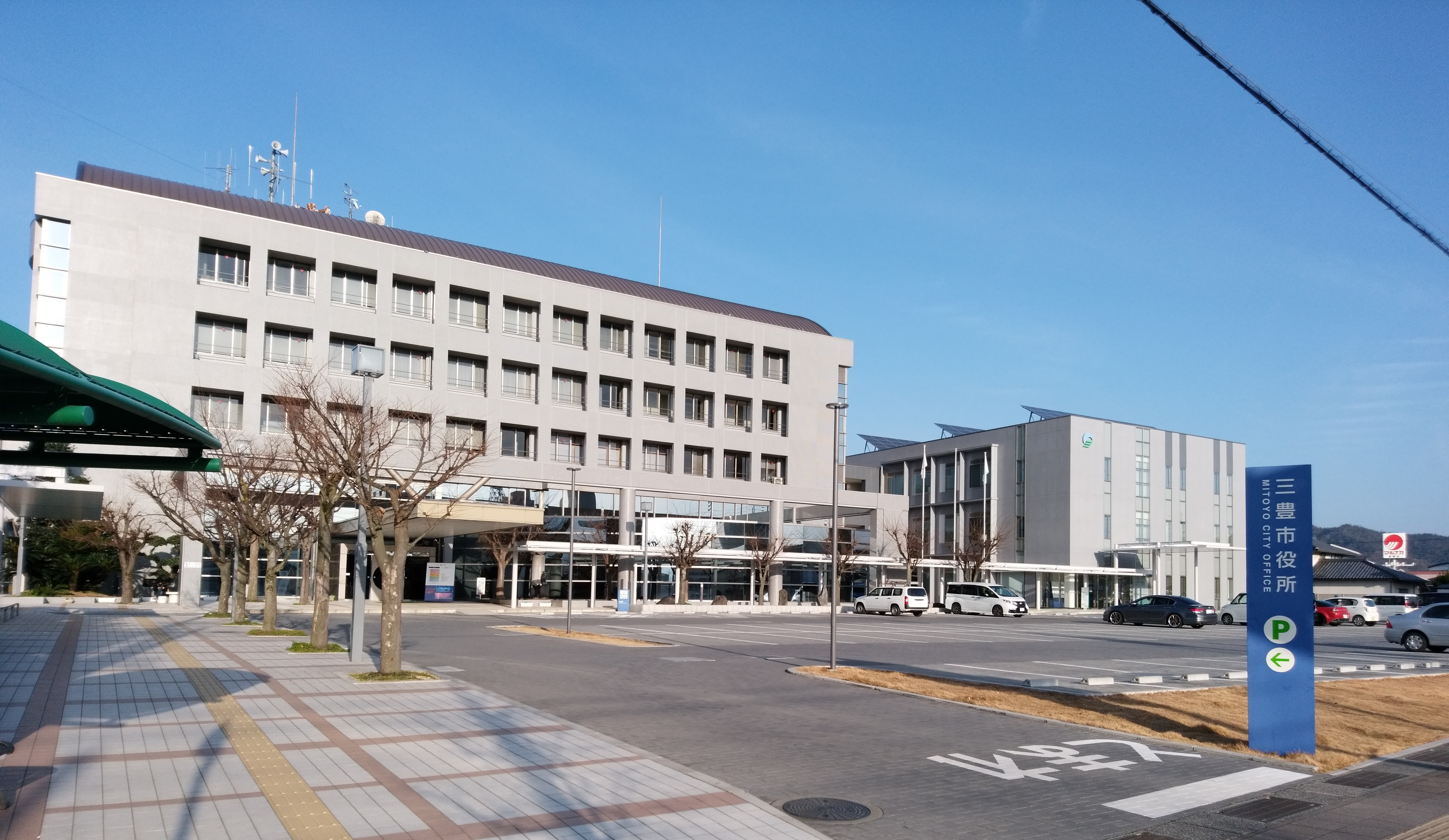
Mitoyo City Hall

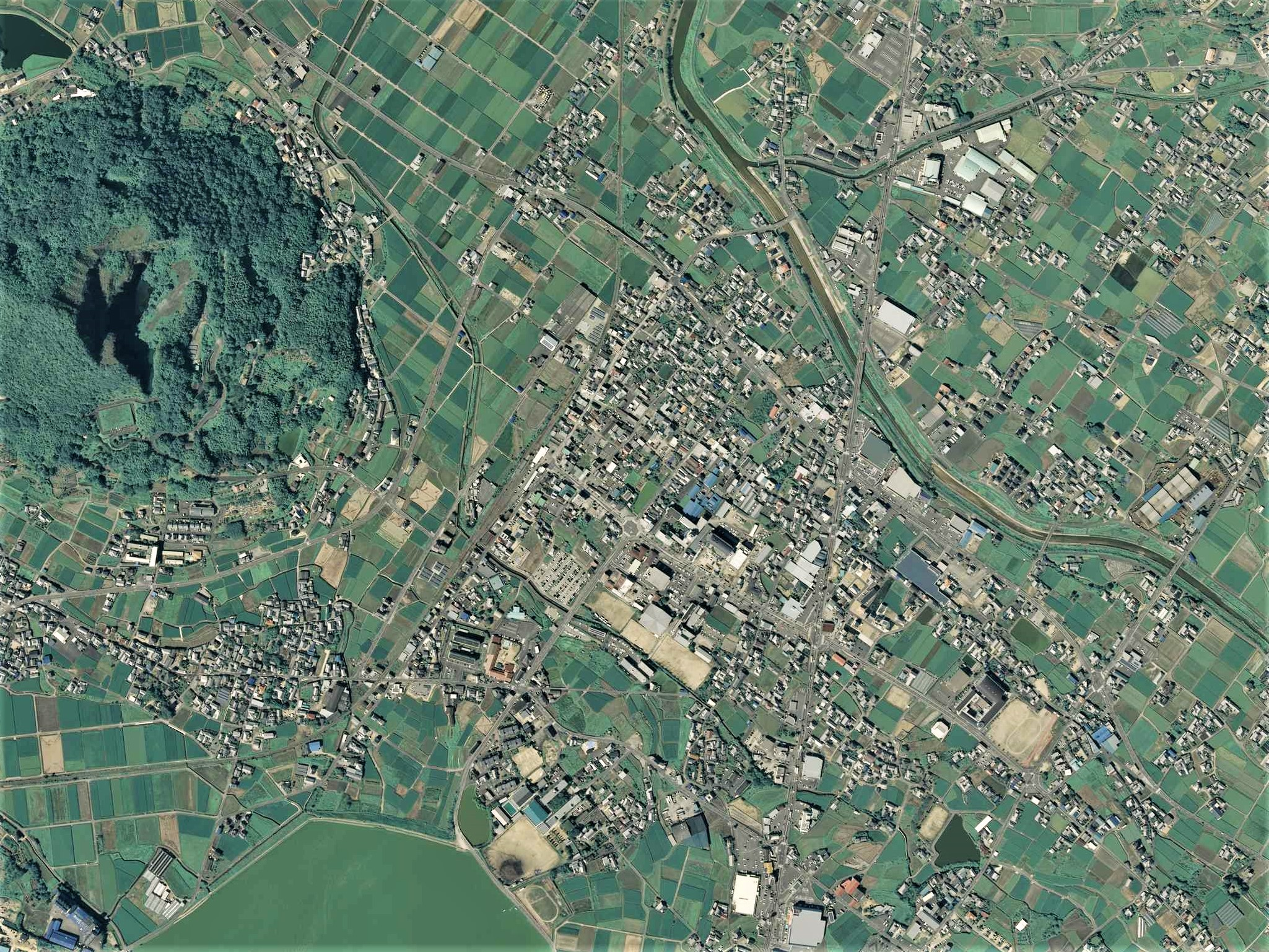
Aerial view of Mitoyo city center

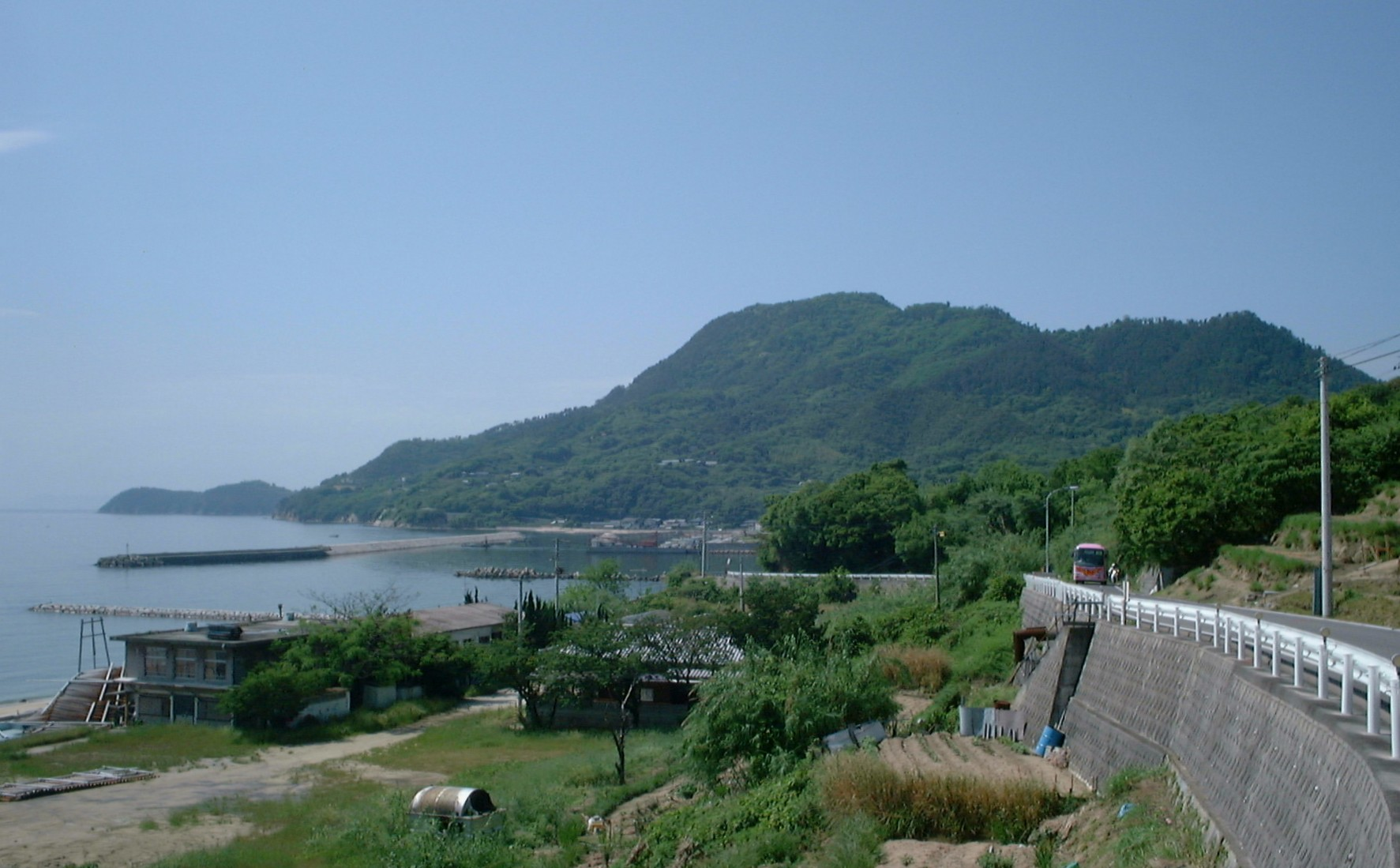
Shiudeyama

Mitoyo (三豊市, Mitoyo-shi) is a city located in Kagawa Prefecture, Japan. As of 31 September 2022, the city had an estimated population of 59,876 in 23024 households and a population density of 270 persons per km^{2}. The total area of the city is 222.73 square kilometres (86.00 sq mi).

== Geography ==
Mitoyo is located in western Kagawa Prefecture. It faces the Seto Inland Sea to the north and borders Tokushima Prefecture across the Sanuki Mountains to the south. In the north, the Shonai Peninsula with Mt. Shiude and Mt. Myoken stretches out to the northwest. Some coastal parts of the city are within the borders of the Setonaikai National Park. The city includes Awashima Island and Shishijima in the Seto Inland Sea between Shikoku and Honshu.

=== Neighbouring municipalities ===
Kagawa Prefecture

- Kan'onji
- Kotohira
- Mannō
- Tadotsu
- Zentsuji

Tokushima Prefecture

- Higashimiyoshi
- Miyoshi

=== Climate ===
Mitoyo has a humid subtropical climate (Köppen climate classification Cfa) with hot, humid summers, and cool winters. Some rain falls throughout the year, but the months from May to September have the heaviest rain. The average annual temperature in Mitoyo is 15.3 °C (59.5 °F). The average annual rainfall is 1,279.7 mm (50.38 in) with July as the wettest month. The temperatures are highest on average in August, at around 27.1 °C (80.8 °F), and lowest in January, at around 4.5 °C (40.1 °F). The highest temperature ever recorded in Mitoyo was 40.0 °C (104.0 °F) on 3 August 2026; the coldest temperature ever recorded was −9.1 °C (15.6 °F) on 4 February 1999.

Climate data for Saita, Mitoyo (1991−2020 normals, extremes 1978−present)
Month	Jan	Feb	Mar	Apr	May	Jun	Jul	Aug	Sep	Oct	Nov	Dec	Year
Record high °C (°F)	19.5 (67.1)	23.5 (74.3)	26.8 (80.2)	29.9 (85.8)	32.7 (90.9)	36.2 (97.2)	38.4 (101.1)	40.0 (104.0)	37.6 (99.7)	32.5 (90.5)	26.9 (80.4)	22.8 (73.0)	40.0 (104.0)
Mean daily maximum °C (°F)	9.5 (49.1)	10.5 (50.9)	14.1 (57.4)	19.9 (67.8)	24.9 (76.8)	27.5 (81.5)	31.4 (88.5)	32.9 (91.2)	28.7 (83.7)	23.2 (73.8)	17.4 (63.3)	11.9 (53.4)	21.0 (69.8)
Daily mean °C (°F)	4.5 (40.1)	4.9 (40.8)	8.2 (46.8)	13.4 (56.1)	18.4 (65.1)	22.2 (72.0)	26.2 (79.2)	27.1 (80.8)	23.2 (73.8)	17.4 (63.3)	11.7 (53.1)	6.6 (43.9)	15.3 (59.6)
Mean daily minimum °C (°F)	−0.2 (31.6)	−0.2 (31.6)	2.5 (36.5)	7.2 (45.0)	12.4 (54.3)	17.7 (63.9)	22.1 (71.8)	22.8 (73.0)	19.0 (66.2)	12.6 (54.7)	6.7 (44.1)	1.9 (35.4)	10.4 (50.7)
Record low °C (°F)	−6.5 (20.3)	−9.1 (15.6)	−4.9 (23.2)	−2.0 (28.4)	3.0 (37.4)	8.2 (46.8)	14.5 (58.1)	15.5 (59.9)	7.9 (46.2)	2.5 (36.5)	−2.0 (28.4)	−5.2 (22.6)	−9.1 (15.6)
Average precipitation mm (inches)	44.7 (1.76)	51.9 (2.04)	86.7 (3.41)	86.0 (3.39)	115.2 (4.54)	171.7 (6.76)	178.7 (7.04)	121.5 (4.78)	183.6 (7.23)	123.6 (4.87)	66.9 (2.63)	61.9 (2.44)	1,279.7 (50.38)
Average precipitation days (≥ 1.0 mm)	7.7	8.3	10.1	10.0	9.4	12.3	10.2	8.0	10.1	8.9	7.8	9.2	112
Mean monthly sunshine hours	111.7	129.3	166.8	193.9	203.9	144.9	182.2	207.1	147.5	157.3	131.2	109.9	1,888.3
Source: Japan Meteorological Agency

== Demographics ==
Per Japanese census data, the population of Mitoyo in 2020 is 61,857 people. Mitoyo has been conducting censuses since 1920.

Historical population
Year	Pop.	±%
1920	69,504	—
1925	71,753	+3.2%
1930	73,608	+2.6%
1935	73,501	−0.1%
1940	72,679	−1.1%
1945	92,233	+26.9%
1950	94,403	+2.4%
1955	90,885	−3.7%
1960	84,827	−6.7%
1965	78,690	−7.2%
1970	75,210	−4.4%
1975	76,726	+2.0%
1980	77,939	+1.6%
1985	78,282	+0.4%
1990	77,284	−1.3%
1995	75,845	−1.9%
2000	73,494	−3.1%
2005	71,180	−3.1%
2010	68,512	−3.7%
2015	65,524	−4.4%
2020	61,857	−5.6%
Mitoyo population statistics

== History ==
The area of Mitoyo was part of the ancient Sanuki Province and has been inhabited since prehistoric times. A number of shell mounds from the Jōmon period have been identified, and the Minami Kusagi Shell Mound is the largest shell mound in Kagawa Prefecture and the Kotsutajima Shell Midden is the oldest in the Seto Inland Sea region. During the Edo Period, the city area was divided between the holdings of Marugame Domain and Tadotsu Domain, and direct tenryō holdings of the Tokugawa shogunate. Following the Meiji restoration, the area was divided into villages within Mino District, which merged with Toyota District to form Mitoyo District, Kagawa in 1899.

The city of Mitoyo was established on January 1, 2006, from the merger of all seven towns of Mitoyo District: Mino, Nio, Saita, Takase, Takuma, Toyonaka and Yamamoto.

== Government ==
Mitoyo has a mayor-council form of government with a directly elected mayor and a unicameral city council of 22 members. Mitoyo contributes three members to the Kagawa Prefectural Assembly. In terms of national politics, the city is part of Kagawa 3rd district of the lower house of the Diet of Japan.

== Economy ==
The area of Mitoyo was noted for its salt industry in ancient times. In the modern era, efforts have been made to develop harbors and industries in the coastal area, creating a coastal industrial zone centered on Takuma Port. On the other hand, the Shonai Peninsula and offshore islands are focused on flower gardening and tourism. Agriculture remains the largest industry, notably fruits such as grapes, mandarin oranges, and peaches. The city is the largest tea producing area in Kagawa Prefecture. Other crops include lettuce, onions, loquats, and rice. Efforts are being made to integrate agriculture and tourism to promote regional development.

== Education ==
Mitoyo has 19 public elementary schools and six public middle schools operated by the city government, and one private middle school. The city has two public high schools operated by the Kagawa Prefectural Board of Education and one private high school.

== Transportation ==
=== Railways ===
Shikoku Railway Company - Yosan Line

- (Tsushimanomiya) - Takuma - Mino - Takase - Hijidai - Motoyama

Shikoku Railway Company - Dosan Line

- Sanuki-Saida

=== Highways ===
- Takamatsu Expressway
- National Route 11
- National Route 32
- National Route 319
- National Route 377

== Sister cities ==
- Waupaca, Wisconsin, United States, sister city since 1994
- Hapcheon County, South Gyeongsang, South Korea, friendship city since July 13, 2007
- Sanyuan County, Qingdao, Shaanxi, China, friendship city since January 13, 2009

== Local attractions ==
- Chichibugahama Beach, It is also called the Salar de Uyuni of Japan
- Daikō-ji, 69th temple on the Shikoku Pilgrimage
- Iyadani-ji, 71st temple on the Shikoku Pilgrimage
- Motoyama-ji, 70th temple on the Shikoku Pilgrimage; its Man Hall is a National Treasure.
- Shiudeyama Site, National Historic Site
- Takaya Shrine, There is a torii gate that is also called the Torii gate of the sky
- Tsushima Shrine, located on an offshore island, is only accessible during its festival one day a year in early August.

== Noted people from Mitoyo ==
- Jun Kaname, actor
- Erika Mabuchi, actress
- Kento Momota, Badminton player
