= Sanuki Kokufu =

Archeological site in Shikoku, Japan

Sanuki Provincial Capital Site
- 讃岐国府跡 (Japanese)
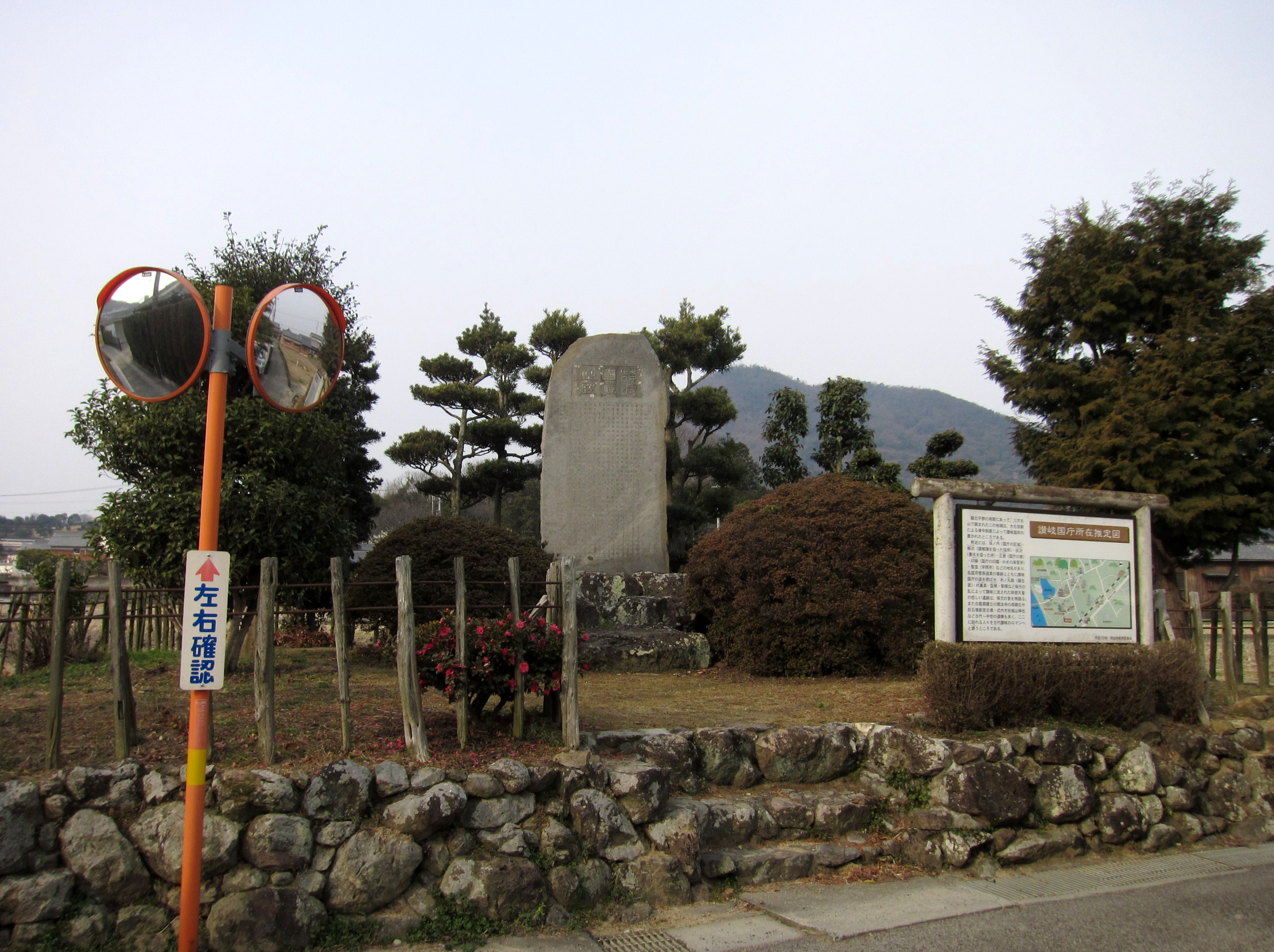
- Sanuki Provincial Capital Site

- Sanuki Provincial Capital Site Sanuki Kokufu (Japan)
- Interactive map of Sanuki Provincial Capital Site
- 34°17′36.8″N 133°55′06.4″E
- Type: Settlement
- Location: Sakaide, Kagawa, Japan
- Region: Shikoku

History
- Built: Nara to Kamakura period

Site notes
- Condition: ruins
- Public access: Yes (no public facilities)

The Sanuki Provincial Capital Site (讃岐国府跡, Sanuki Kokufu ato) is an archaeological site consisting of the ruins of the Nara period to early Heian period Provincial Capital of Sanuki Province, located in the Fuchū neighborhood of the city of Sakaide, Kagawa on the island of Shikoku Japan. The site was designated a National Historic Site of Japan in 2020.

== Overview ==
Following the Taika Reform (645 AD) which aimed at a centralization of the administration following the Chinese model (ritsuryō), provincial capitals were established in the various provinces, headed by an official titled kokushi, who replaced the older Kuni no miyatsuko. With a square layout, the provincial capitals were patterned after the Capital of Japan, first Fujiwara-kyō and then Heijō-kyō, which in turn were modelled on the Tang capital Chang'an, but on a much, much smaller scale. Each had office buildings for administration, finance, police and military and the official building of the governor, as well as granaries for tax rice and other taxable produce. In the periphery there was the provincial temple (kokubun-ji), and nunnery (kokubun-niji) and the garrison. This system collapsed with the growth of feudalism in the Late Heian period, and the location of many of the provincial capitals is now lost.

The Sanuki Provincial Capital was one such "lost" location, its approximate location only surmised from anecdotal evidence, such as the place name of "Fuchū" at the base of the massive Asuka-period Kiyama fortifications, and records indicating that Sugawara no Michizane, the early Heian period kokushi of Sanuki Province worshipped at Shiroyama Shrine at base of Kiyama. The Kagawa Prefectural Buried Cultural Property Center launched a project from 2009 to 2017 in order to clarify the location and structure of the Sanuki Kokufu, using topographic surveys, place name surveys, and archaeological excavations in cooperation with volunteer groups.

In 2011, the Kagawa Prefectural Board of Education began an excavation survey in the eastern area of Kaiho-ji temple ruins, and found remains from the middle of the 7th century, before the establishment of the kokufu, to the 13th century, after its abolition. This temple is mentioned by Sugawara no Michizane is a collection of poems as being located immediately west of the kokufu. Archaeological investigations confirmed that portions of foundation stones remained underground and in the nearby fields, which form what appears to be the traces of a block of buildings 80 meters on each side, which is believed to be the central portion of the kokufu area in the latter half of the 7th century. further surveys found that from the middle of the 8th century to the 11th century, multiple pillar-supported buildings, including large buildings, appeared and were maintained over a long period of time while being repeatedly rebuilt. From the middle of the 11th century to the 13th century, three blocks of 40-meter-long mansions with wells were found. The Sagami Kokufu thus lasted almost to the end of the Kamakura period and the discovery of its ruins are an important archaeological site for understanding the evolution and actual state the provincial government structures.

== See also ==
- List of Historic Sites of Japan (Kagawa)
