= Nakadera temple ruins =

- 中寺廃寺跡 (Japanese)
- Nakasera temple ruins Nakadera temple ruins (Japan)
- 34°07′30″N 133°54′58″E
- Type: temple ruins
- Periods: Heian period
- Location: Mannō, Kagawa, Japan
- Region: Shikoku

Site notes
- Public access: Yes (no public facilities)

The Nakadera temple ruins (中寺廃寺跡, Nakadera haiji ato) is an archaeological site with the ruins of a Heian period Buddhist temple located in the town of Mannō, Kagawa Prefecture, on the island of Shikoku, Japan. The site was designated a National Historic Site of Japan in 2008.

== Overview ==
Nakadera temple ruins are located at an elevation of 600 to 700 meters, a little below the main ridgeline of Mount Okawa, the second highest peak in the Sanuki Mountains, in southern Kagawa Prefecture. The abandoned temple site consists of three main areas on the slope of the ridge. The total area is 400 meters from east-to-west and 600 meters from north-to-south. A south-facing Buddhist hall and a pagoda were arranged in the two-tiered flat surface at the highest point, forming the central part of the temple. Five Sue ware jars and one Haji ware jar were excavated under the stone in the center of the building, which may have been the base of the pagoda. On the east side, a ridge contained the foundations of a Buddhist temple building which measured five by three bays, and on the southern slope were are the foundations for several pillar buildings. A Sue ware jar from Nishi-Harima and a Yue ware celadon bowl were excavated. On the south side, 16 remnants of stonework in an almost square pattern may have been the foundations for a stone memorial stupa. Based on excavated relics, it is believed that the temple was built in the Heian period, at some time between the 10th and 11th centuries.

Ancient temples were generally located on flat ground, but in the Heian period, mountain temples such as Enryaku-ji on Mount Hiei and Kongobu-ji on Mount Kōya were constructed. However, this temple does not appear in any historical records and its history in completely unknown.

== See also ==
- List of Historic Sites of Japan (Kagawa)
