= Sanuki Kokubunni-ji =

Historic religious ruin in Takamatsu, Tokushima, Japan

Sanuki Kokubun-niji ruins
- 讃岐国分尼寺跡 (Japanese)
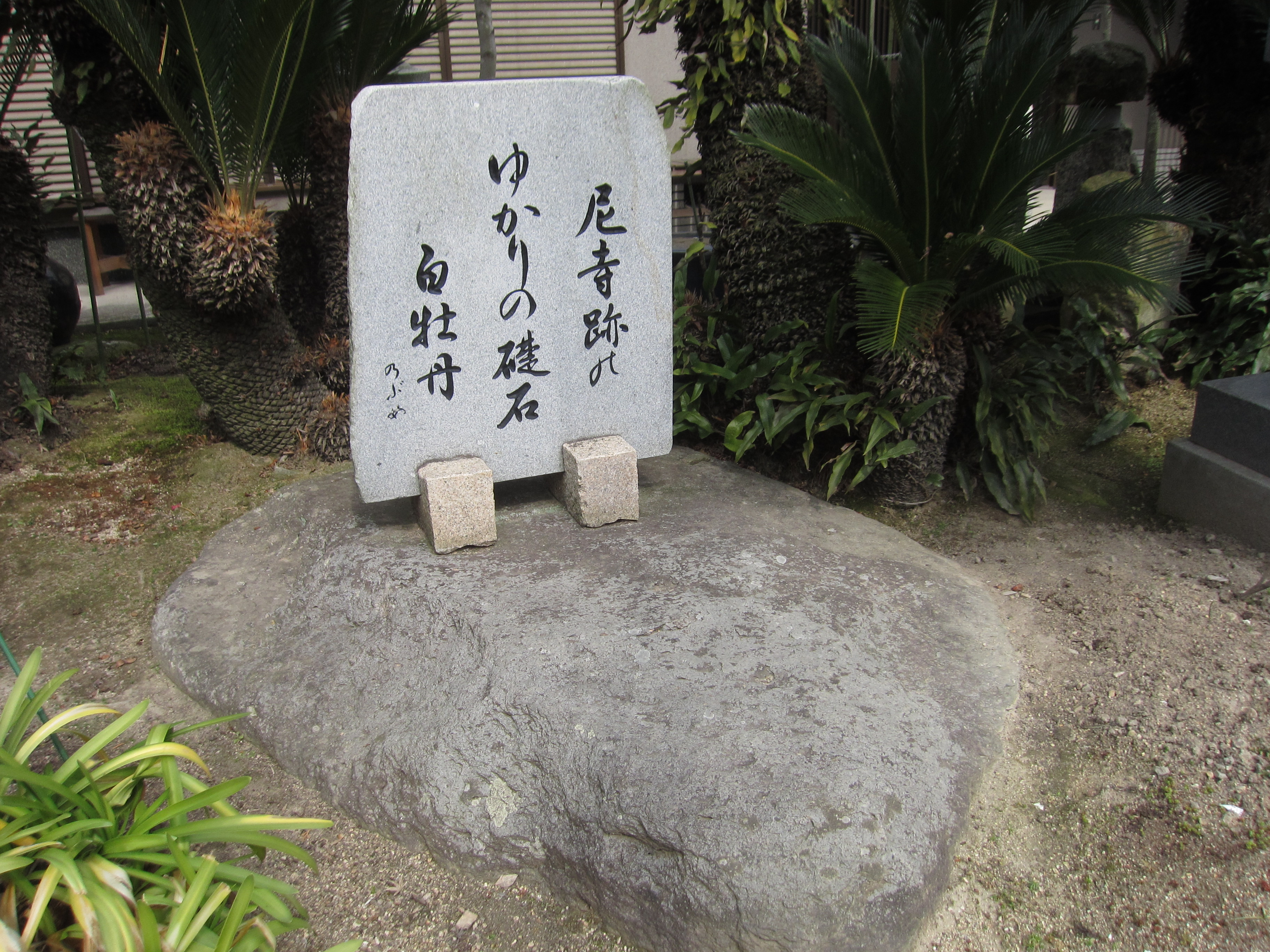
- Foundation stone from the Sanuki Kokubun-niji ruins

- Location within Kagawa Prefecture Location within Japan
- 34°18′35.31″N 133°57′44.88″E
- Type: Buddhist temple ruins
- Location: Takamatsu, Kagawa, Japan

History
- Founder: c.Emperor Shōmu
- Built: Nara period
- National Historic Site of Japan

The Sanuki Kokubun-niji ruins (讃岐国分尼寺跡) is an archaeological site with the ruins of a Nara period Buddhist nunnery in the Kokubunji neighborhood of the city of Takamatsu, Kagawa Prefecture Japan. Its ruins were designated as a National Historic Site in 1928.

== History ==
The Shoku Nihongi records that in 741, as the country recovered from a major smallpox epidemic, Emperor Shōmu ordered that a monastery and nunnery be established in every province, the kokubunji (国分寺). These temples were built to a semi-standardized template, and served both to spread Buddhist orthodoxy to the provinces, and to emphasize the power of the Nara period centralized government under the Ritsuryō system. While the sites of most of the kokubun-ji monasteries are either known or have been discovered, very few sites of the kokubun-niji nunneries are known.

The Sanuki Kokubun-niji site is located approximately two kilometers northeast of the Sanuki Kokubun-ji. The site occupies a trapezoidal compound 180–210 meters east-to-west by 180 meters north-to-south and per archaeological excavations conducted in 1982 was found to contain 19 foundation stones from what is presumed to have been the Main Hall of the nunnery, as well a roof tiles and bricks. The spacing and orientation of the foundations indicates a seven by four bay building. It is believed that the Lecture Hall and residence was lined up from south to north, as a further excavation has found more large foundation stones scatters on the north side of the precinct, with a rain drainage ditch in parallel. However, excavations are hampered by the presence of a later Buddhist temple, Hokke-ji, which now occupies the approximate center of the site, and many details of the original Nara-period temple remain uncertain.

The site is about a 20-minute walk from Hashioka Station on the JR Shikoku Yosan Line.

== See also ==
- List of Historic Sites of Japan (Kagawa)
- provincial temple
