= Fuchū-Yamanouchi Tile Kiln ruins =

Remains of Nara period kilns in Takamatsu, Japan

- 府中・山内瓦窯跡 (Japanese)
- Fuchū-Yamanouchi Tile Kiln ruins Fuchū-Yamanouchi Tile Kiln ruins (Japan)
- 34°17′39″N 133°56′19″E
- Periods: Nara period
- Location: Sakaide - Takamatsu, Kagawa, Japan
- Region: Shikoku

Site notes
- Public access: Yes
- National Historic Site of Japan

Fuchū-Yamanouchi Tile Kiln ruins (府中・山内瓦窯跡, Fuchū-Yamanouchi kawara-gama ato) is an archaeological site consisting of the remains of a Nara period kiln located in what is now the Fuchu neighborhood of the city of Sakaide and the Kokubunji neighborhood of the city of Takamatsu, Kagawa Prefecture on the island of Shikoku, Japan. It has been protected by the central government as a National Historic Site since 1922.

== Overview ==
The use of tiled roofs, which was a symbol of continental culture and the advanced state of the central administration, spread during the Asuka and Nara period to Buddhist temples and regional administrative centers. The Fuchū-Yamanouchi kiln is located about one kilometer southwest of the Sanuki Kokubun-ji and is on the border between Sakaide and Takamatsu cities. This anagama kiln is located on a slope and has a total length of over three meters. In the vicinity of the kiln, eaves tiles with the same pattern as roof tiles unearthed from the ruins of Sanuki Kokubun-ji and the Sanuki Kokubun-niji have been unearthed, so it is clear that the tiles of both temples were fired at this kiln. There were once around 14 kiln sites in the area, but today only this one remains in almost complete shape. Based on excavated roof tiles, it is believed to have been built in the Nara period. The site is about 15 minutes on foot from Kokubu Station on the JR Shikoku Yosan Line Takase Station.

== See also ==
- List of Historic Sites of Japan (Kagawa)
