= Arioka Kofun Cluster =

Historic burial mounds in Zentsūji, Kagawa, Japan

Arioka Kofun cluster
- 有岡古墳群 (Japanese)
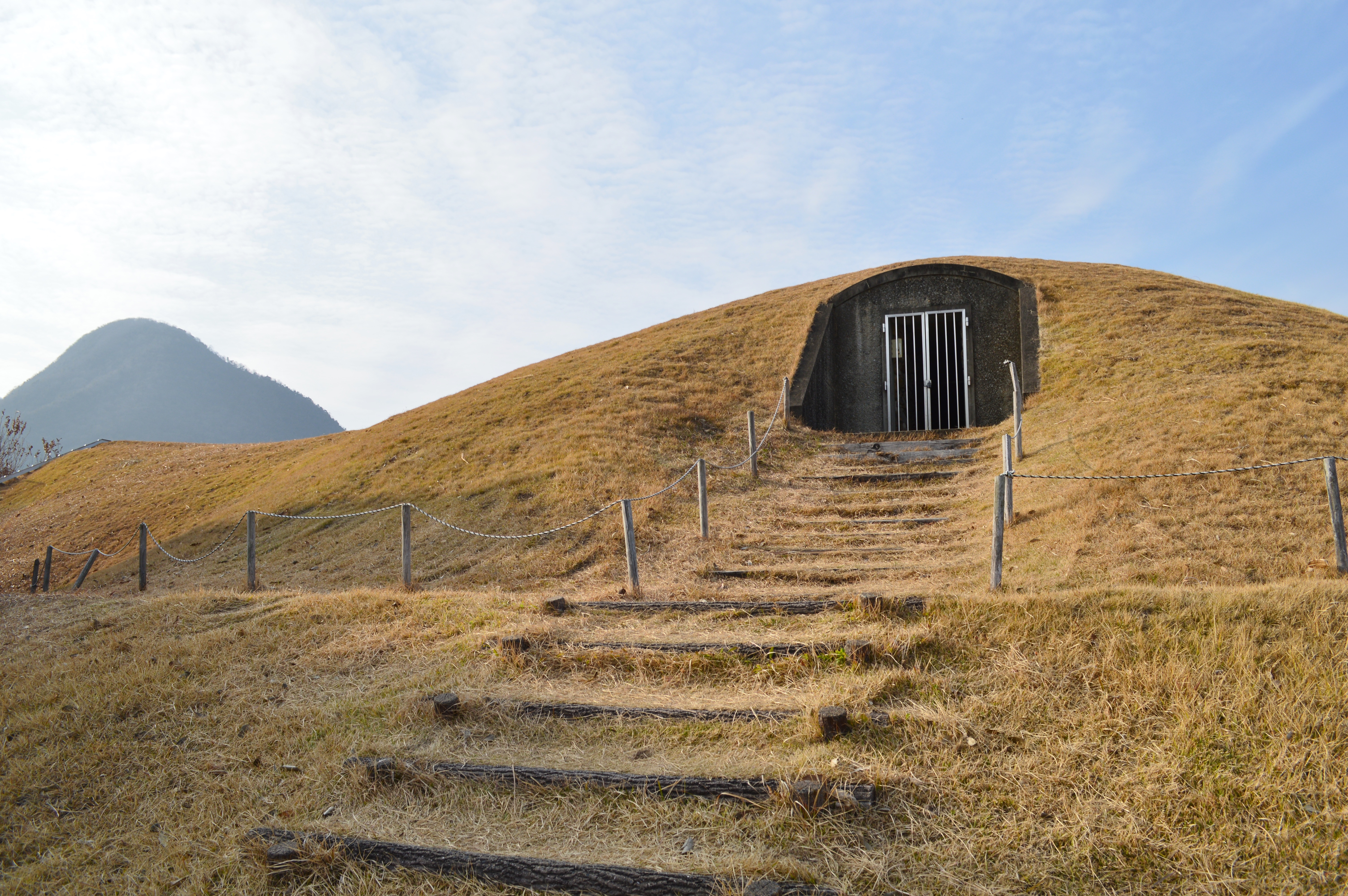
- Ohakayama_Kofun in the Arioka Kofun cluster

- Arioka Kofun cluster Arioka Kofun Cluster (Japan)
- 34°13′00″N 133°47′25″E
- Type: Kofun
- Periods: Kofun period
- Location: Zentsūji, Kagawa, Japan
- Region: Shikoku

History
- Built: late 6th - mid-7th century AD

Site notes
- Public access: Yes
- National Historic Site of Japan

The Arioka Kofun Cluster (有岡古墳群, Arioka Kofun-gun) is a group of kofun burial mounds located in the city of Zentsūji, Kagawa Prefecture, on the island of Shikoku of Japan. The tumuli were collectively designated a National Historic Site in 1984. It is claimed to be a group of tombs of the powerful local family who were the ancestors of the famed prelate Kūkai.

== Overview ==
The Arioka Kofun cluster is located in the central part of Kagawa Prefecture, and are located on a hill in the southwestern part of Zentsūji city, overlooking the Seto Inland Sea. The site consists of six tumuli. The all are zenpō-kōen-fun (前方後円墳), which are shaped like a keyhole, having one square end and one circular end, when viewed from above, with the exception of the Miyagao Kofun, which is a circular-type (empun (円墳)). Of these tumuli, four are protected by the National Historic Site designation and are well maintained.

The Nota-no-in Kofun was built in the latter half of the 3rd century and is the oldest of the group. It has a total length of 44 meters. The anterior rectangular portion is 13 meters wide and 1.6 meters high, and the posterior circular portion is 21 meters in diameter and two meters high. Grave goods included Glass beads, iron swords, and Haji ware pottery and many pot-shaped earthenware vessels were unearthed from around the burial mound.

The Ohakayama Kofun is located in the central part of the cluster.It is orientated to the southwest, and both cylindrical and figurative haniwa have been found. It has a side-entry stone burial chamber, and many grave goods were excavated, including the first gilt-bronze crowns found in Japan, earthenware, ornaments, weapons and horse harnesses. From these grave goods, the date of the tumulus was determined to be the late Kofun period, towards the end of the 6th century. The tumulus has a total length of 46 meters, with the anterior rectangular portion 28 meters wide and five meters high, and the posterior circular portion 28 meters in diameter and six meters high. The southern part of the anterior portion has been leveled. The burial chamber is about three meters long and about 1.8 meters wide, with a 4.5 meter entry passage. Archaeological excavation surveys have been carried out in 1982 and 1986-1990.

The Miyagao Kofun is a decorated kofun, and retains remnants of line paintings depicting warriors on the road, groups of people on horseback, and fleets of ships on the back wall of its tunnel-style stone burial chamber. It is estimated to date from the latter half of the 6th century. It is located west of the Ohakayama Kofun, and a Shinto Shrine occupies part of the mound.

The Murusuyama Kofun is located on Mt. Murusu at an elevation of 121 meters. A ship-shaped hollowed-out stone sarcophagus was excavated and has bene designated a National Important Cultural Property. No excavations have been carried out so far, except for the fact that it was subjected to reckless digging during the Edo period. It is orientated to the west and both fukiishi and haniwa have been found on the surface of the mound. There is no trace of a moat. It has a total length of 49.2 meters, with an anterior rectangular portion 10.8 meters wide and 1.75 meters high, and the posterior circular portion 42 meters in diameter and 3.5 meters high. The sarcophagus is made of hornblende andesite and measures 2.37 meters, 0.79 meters wide, and 0.35-0.43 meters high. The lid has a cross-section that is almost triangular with steps on the sides, and the coffin body has ridges on the sides. In addition, stone pillows were created inside the coffin, and earrings in the form of magatama-shaped beads were engraved on the left and right sides of the neck, and traces of vermillion were found on the inside. This tumulus is estimated to have been built in the latter half of the 4th century, or the early Kofun period.

The Tsurugamine No. 4 Kofun is located at the southwestern end of the ridge of Tsurugamine at an elevation of 125meters. It is not covered by the National Historic Site designation. The Maruyama Kofun is located behind the main building of Kitamuki Hachiman Shrine. It is 54 meters long and 30 meters in diameter, and is thought to have been built in the middle of the 5th century. It is also not covered by the National Historic Site designation.

The site is open to the public as an archaeological park, and is located about a five-minute walk from Zentsuji Station by the JR Shikoku Dosan Line. It also contains the Zentsuji Municipal Folk Museum, which houses and displays artifacts excavated from the Arioka Burial Mounds. April 29 is designated as 'Kofun Day' in Zentsuji City.

Arioka Kofun cluster
Name	Location	Type	Size	Date
Nota-no-in Kofun (野田院古墳)	34°11′52.1″N 133°46′46.4″E	keyhole	length: 44 m	late 3rd C
Ohakayama Kofun (王墓山古墳)	34°12′50.9″N 133°46′23.3″E	keyhole	length: 46 m	early rth C
Miyagao Kofun (宮が尾古墳)	34°12′22.9″N 133°46′8.1″E	circular		early 7th C
Murusuyama Kofun (磨臼山古墳)	34°13′4.8″N 133°47′35.5″E	keyhole	length: 42 m	late 4th C

== Gallery ==
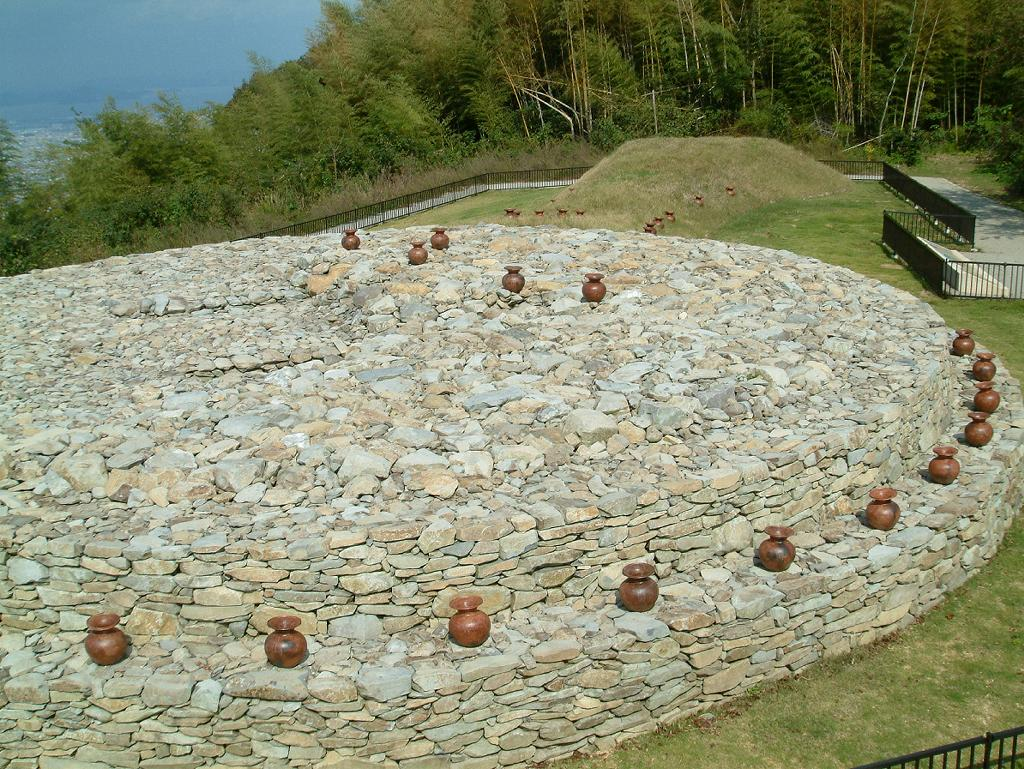
Nota-no-in Kofun

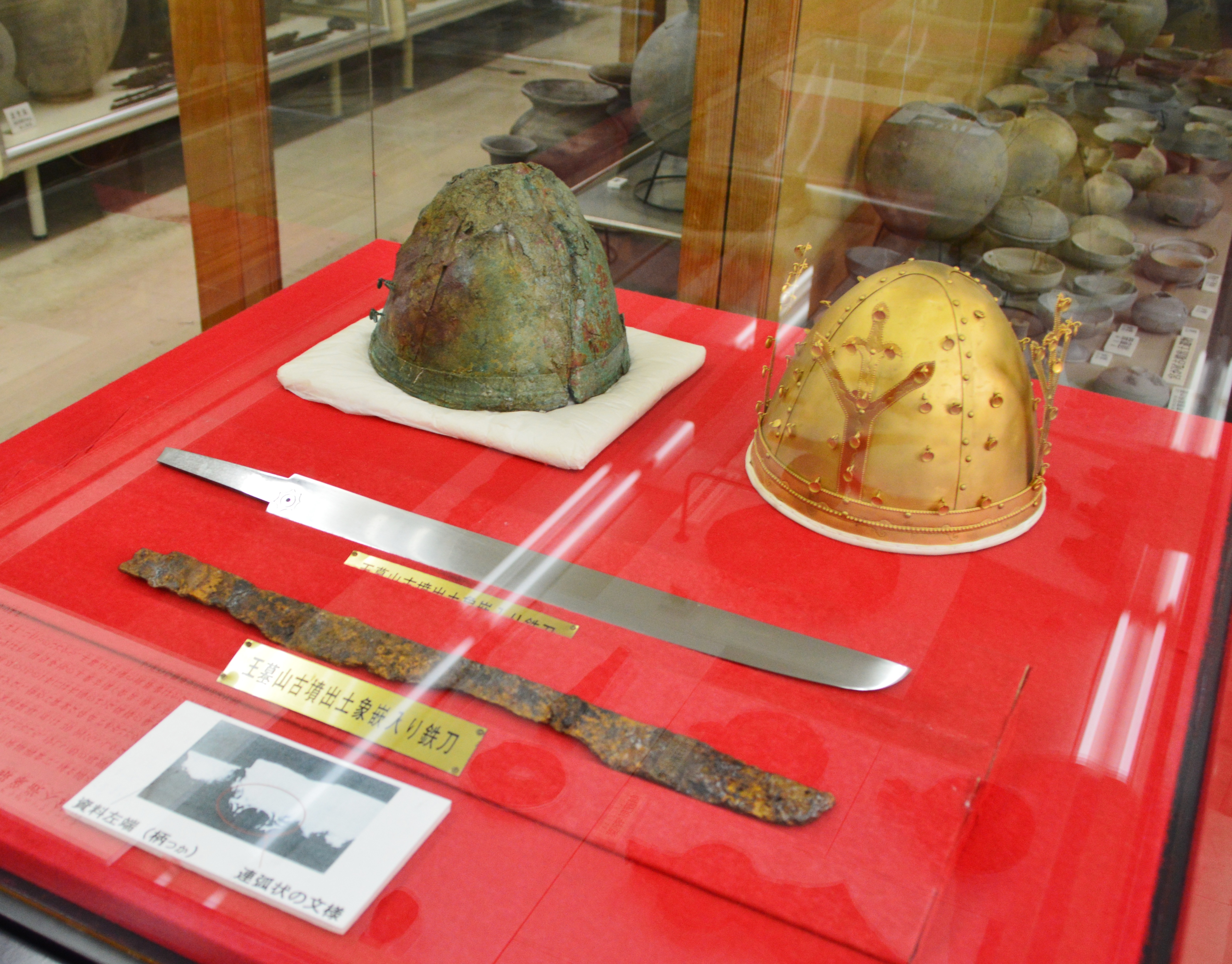
Ohakayama Kofun excavated artifacts

== See also ==
- List of Historic Sites of Japan (Kagawa)
