= Muneyoshi Tile Kiln ruins =

Remains of Asuka period kilns in Mitoyo, Japan

- 宗吉瓦窯跡 (Japanese)
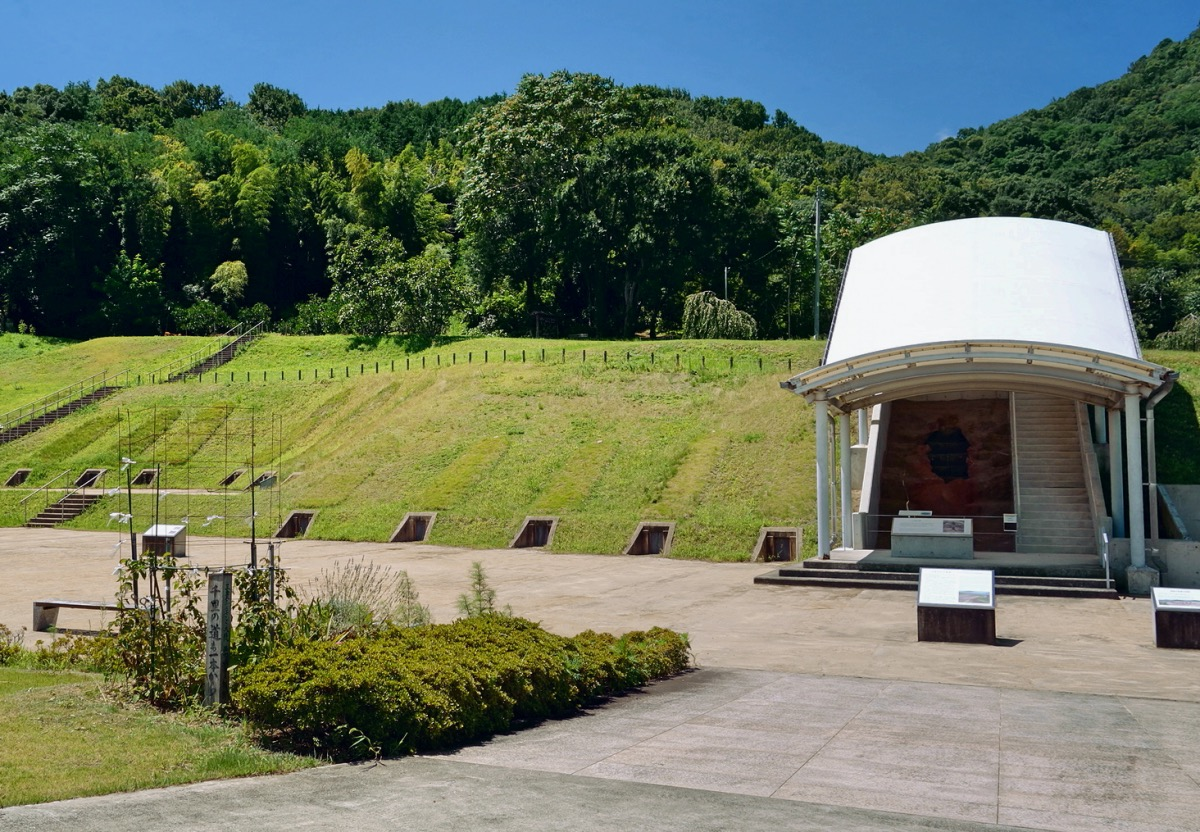
- Muneyoshi Tile Kiln ruins

- Muneyoshi Tile Kiln ruins Muneyoshi Tile Kiln ruins (Japan)
- Interactive map of Muneyoshi Tile Kiln ruins
- 34°11′34″N 133°41′57″E
- Periods: Asuka - Nara period
- Location: Mitoyo, Kagawa, Japan
- Region: Shikoku

Site notes
- Public access: Yes

Muneyoshi Tile Kiln Site ruins (宗吉瓦窯跡, Muneyoshi gayō ato) is an archaeological site consisting of the remains of twenty-one Asuka to Nara period kilns located in what is now the Mino neighborhood of the city of Mitoyo, Kagawa Prefecture on the island of Shikoku Japan. It has been protected by the central government as a National Historic Site since 1996.

== Overview ==
Fujiwara-kyō (藤原京), located in Yamato Province (present-day Kashihara in Nara Prefecture), was the Imperial capital of Japan for sixteen years, between 694 and 710. The palace occupied a plot measuring about 1 km^{2} and its Daigokuden (大極殿) and other palace buildings were the first palace structures in Japan to have roof tiles in the Chinese style. Roof tiles were considered prestigious, and a symbol of continental culture and the advanced state of the central administration.

The Muneyoshi Tile Kiln ruins are located on a slightly elevated slope of a hilly area surrounded by farmland. The presence of kilns in the era was reflected in local legends which stated that the famed Buddhist priest Kūkai instructed the locals on the manufacturing of roof tiles during his travels in this region of Shikoku. During the Taisho period, round eaves tiles with the same design as tiles used the southern wall surrounding the Daigokuden Palace of Fujiwara-kyō were discovered. Archaeological excavations have found the remnants of at total of 24 tile kilns, the oldest dating to the Asuka period (approximately 650 AD), along with the foundations of a building with standing pillars, believed to be the remains of a workshop.The No.17 kiln was 13 meters long by 2 meters wide by 1.4 meters high, making it one of the largest known noborigama kilns in Japan. It is theorized that the firing section was extraordinary long because the large quantities of roof tiles required for the Fujiwara-kyō Palace necessitated large-scale production techniques. Both flat and round tiles were produced at this site, and chemical analysis of tiles recovered from Fujiwara-kyō has verified that the clay came from deposits located within ten kilometers of the Muneyoshi Tile Kiln Site.

Initially, the site was believed to have been a government industrial site specifically for the Fujiwara-kyō Palace construction. However, later excavations found that roof tiles predating the Fujiwara-kyō Palace were used in the local Myon-ji temple ruins and the Hōdō-ji temple ruins in Marugame came from this kiln. This indicates that the kiln was operated by local ruling families prior to its involvement with the palace project.

The site is now an archaeological park, with one of the kilns restored, and a museum displaying artifacts recovered. It is five minutes by car from JR Shikoku Mino Station.

== See also ==
- List of Historic Sites of Japan (Kagawa)
