= Shiwaku Kinbansho =

- 塩飽勤番所 (Japanese)
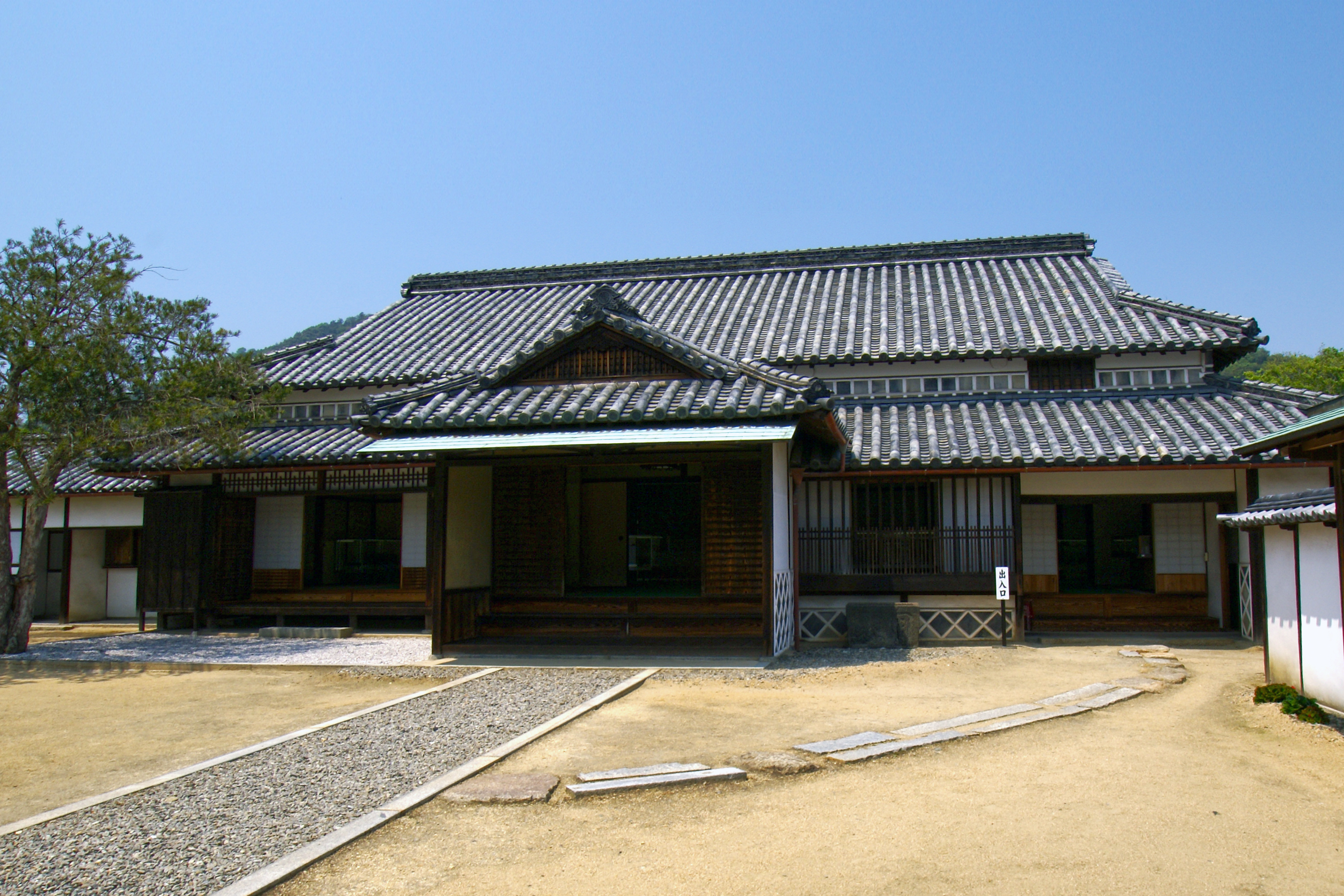

- Location in Japan Shiwaku Kinbansho (Japan)
- 34°23′16″N 133°47′02″E
- Periods: Edo period
- Location: Marugame, Kagawa, Japan
- Region: Shikoku

Site notes
- Public access: Yes (Museum)

The Shiwaku Kinbansho (塩飽勤番所) is the former government office of the Shiwaku Islands in the Seto Inland Sea under the Tokugawa shogunate of Edo period Japan. It is located in the city of Marugame, Kagawa on the island of Honjima, and is now a museum exhibiting the history of the Shiwaku navy. The site has been designated by the central government as a National Historic Site since 1970.

== Overview ==
During the Sengoku period, Toyotomi Hideyoshi granted red seals to 650 sailors from the Shiwaku Islands who had assisted his invasion of Korea. These sailors were called "ninmyo" and were given the privilege of self-government, without belonging to any daimyō. Administration of the Shiwaku Islands was conducted by four headmen selected from the 650 red seal holders, who used their homes as government offices and took turns managing government affairs. After the establishment of the Tokugawa shogunate, the islands became tenryō territory under the direct control of the shogunate, but preserved their privilege of self-government until the Meiji restoration of 1868.

The Shiwaku Kinbansho was constructed in 1798. The site is about 42 meters square and is surrounded by a moat and earthen walls on three sides. The south-facing nagaya-mon gate has a guard room, the main building has a irimoya-zukuri-style gabled roof, the office is in the back, and a warehouse is built in the northwestern courtyard. The museum contains letters of authorization signed by Oda Nobunaga, Toyotomi Hideyoshi and Tokugawa Ieyasu, documents recording disputes between the islands and Takamatsu Domain and artifacts brought back from the United States, as many of the sailors on the Kanrin-maru were natives of the Shiwaku Islands.

The site is located about ten minutes on foot from Honjima Port.

== See also ==
- List of Historic Sites of Japan (Kagawa)
