= Iwaseoyama Kofun Cluster =

- 石清尾山古墳群 (Japanese)
- Iwaseoyama Kofun Cluster Iwaseoyama Kofun Cluster (Japan)
- 34°19′39.6″N 134°01′25.0″E
- Type: kofun
- Periods: Kofun period
- Location: Takamatsu, Kagawa, Japan
- Region: Shikoku

History
- Built: 4th century AD

Site notes
- Elevation: 10 m (33 ft)
- Public access: Yes
- National Historic Site of Japan

The Iwaseoyama Kofun Cluster (石清尾山古墳群, Iwaseoyama kofun-gun) is a group of Kofun period burial mounds located on the Iwaseo mountains spreading across the Mineyama, Muromachi, Miyawaki, Nishikasuga, Tsuruichi, and Nishitakara neighborhoods of the city of Takamatsu, Kagawa Prefecture on the island of Shikoku Japan. The cluster was designated a National Historic Site in 1934, with the era under protection expanded in 1985 and 1989.

== Overview ==
The Iwaseoyama Kofun cluster is located along the ridge line of the summit of Mt. Iwashio, (elevation 230 meters above sea level), which is located southwest of the center of Takamatsu city. The cluster consists of more than 200 piled stone mounds along with a number of embankment mounds. All were constructed over a period of approximately 100 years from the 4th to 5th centuries, or the early to late Kofun period. The piled stone mounds are rare in Japan, and are made from andesite, which forms the base of the summit area of the mountain. Of these tumuli, a total of 16 are designated the national historic site, consisting of 14 piled-stone mounds and two embanked burial mounds. The shape of the tumuli are diverse. Of the piled-stone tumuli, the Nekozuka Kofun, Kagamizuka Kofun, and Inariyama-hokutan Kofun are hour-glass shaped futa-hocho-enpun (双方中円墳)-style tumuli, the Kita Otsuka East mound is a hōfun (方墳)-style square tumulus, the Inariyama Minamitsuka North Kofun is a round empun (円墳)-style tumulus, and the others are keyhole-shaped zenpō-kōen-fun (前方後円墳) mounds.

At 96 meters long and 5 meters high, the Nekozuka Kofun is the largest of the burial mounds. It was robbed in antiquity, but some surviving grave goods include bronze mirrors and swords, iron swords, arrowheds and axes, and Haji ware pottery.

In 1934, the Ishifunezuka Kofun was designated as a national historic site, but in 1985, a large number of kofun on the summit were additionally designated, and the historic site designation was renamed. In 1989, Tsuruo Shrine No. 4 Kofun was added to the designation. The kofun are maintained as a hiking course, and are located approximately 15 minutes by car from Takamatsu Station on the JR Shikoku Yosan Line. .

== See also ==
- List of Historic Sites of Japan (Kagawa)
