= Ōtaki-Ōkawa Prefectural Natural Park =

Prefectural Natural Park in Kanagawa, Japan

- 大滝大川県立自然公園
- Interactive map of Ōtaki-Ōkawa Prefectural Natural Park
- Location: Kagawa Prefecture, Japan
- Area: 23.63 km^{2} (9.12 sq mi)
- Established: 14 September 1992

Ōtaki-Ōkawa Prefectural Natural Park (大滝大川県立自然公園, Ōtaki-Ōkawa kenritsu shizen kōen) is a Prefectural Natural Park on the southern border of Kagawa Prefecture, Japan. Established in 1992, the park comprises two non-contiguous areas of the Sanuki Mountains. It includes Mount Ōtaki (大滝山) (946 m) and Mount Ōkawa (大川山) (1043 m).

== See also ==
- National Parks of Japan
- Setonaikai National Park
