= List of historic sites of Japan (Kagawa) =

This list is of the historic sites of Japan located within the Prefecture of Kagawa.

== National Historic Sites ==
As of 29 February 2024, twenty-six Sites have been designated as being of national significance (including one *Special Historic Site).

Site	Municipality	Comments	Image	Coordinates	Type	Ref.
*Sanuki Kokubun-ji Site 讃岐国分寺跡; Sanuki Kokubunji ato	Takamatsu	Nara period provincial temple of Sanuki Province; 80th temple of the Shikoku pilgrimage		34°18′10″N 133°56′39″E	3	
Amagiri Castle ruins 天霧城跡; Amagiri-jō ato	Zentsūji, Tadotsu, Mitoyo	Muromachi/Sengoku period castle ruins		34°14′10″N 133°44′10″E	2	
Arioka Kofun Cluster 有岡古墳群; Arioka kofun-gun	Zentsūji	Kofun period tumuli		34°13′00″N 133°47′25″E	1	
Iwaseoyama Kofun Cluster 石清尾山古墳群; Iwaseoyama kofun-gun	Takamatsu	Kofun period tumuli		34°19′53″N 134°01′27″E	1	
Shōdoshima Osaka Castle Stone Quarry sites 大坂城石垣石丁場跡; Ōsaka-jō ishigaki ishi chōba ato	Shōdoshima	designation includes the Shōdoshima Quarry Site (小豆島石丁場跡) and Higashi-Rokkō Quarry Site (東六甲石丁場跡)		34°30′33″N 134°21′12″E	2	
Ōnohara Kofun cluster 大野原古墳群; Ōnohara kofun-gun	Kan'onji	Kofun period tumuli		34°05′16″N 133°39′48″E	1	
Kaitenyama Kofun 快天山古墳; Kaitenyama kofun	Marugame	Kofun period tumulus		34°14′20″N 133°53′26″E	1	
Kibeejima Saltworks Site 喜兵衛島製塩遺跡; Kibeejima seien iseki	Naoshima	Kofun period salt factory		34°30′05″N 133°58′36″E	6	
Kiyama 城山; Kiyama	Sakaide, Marugame	Asuka period castle ruins		34°17′23″N 133°53′23″E	1	
Sanuki Kokufu Site 讃岐国府跡; Sanuki kokufu ato	Sakaide	Nara period provincial capital of Sanuki Province		34°17′35″N 133°55′06″E	2	
Sanuki Kokubunni-ji Site 讃岐国分尼寺跡; Sanuki Kokubunniji ato	Takamatsu	Nara period provincial nunnery of Sanuki Province		34°18′35″N 133°57′45″E	3	
Sanuki Henro-michi 讃岐遍路道; Sanuki henro-michi	Mitoyo, Sakaide, Takamatsu, Zentsuji	pilgrimage route; includes Mandara-ji michi (曼荼羅寺道), Zentsū-ji michi (善通寺道) and Negoro-ji michi (根香寺道)		34°20′39″N 133°57′38″E	3, 6	
Shiudeyama Site 紫雲出山遺跡; Shiudeyama ato	Mitoyo	Yayoi period settlement trace		34°14′38″N 133°35′47″E	1	
Shiwaku Kinbansho Site 塩飽勤番所跡; Shiwaku kinbansho ato	Marugame	Edo-period Bansho		34°23′16″N 133°47′02″E	2	
Takamatsu Castle 高松城跡; Takamatsu-jō ato	Takamatsu	Edo Period castle		34°21′00″N 134°03′01″E	2	
Takamatsu Matsudaira clan cemetery 高松藩主松平家墓所; Takamatsu-han-shu Matsudaira-ke bosho	Takamatsu	Edo Period daimyo cemetery at Hōnen-ji (法然寺)		34°16′25″N 134°02′46″E	7	
Tsuda Kofun Cluster 津田古墳群; Tsuda kofun-gun	Sanuki	Kofun cluster		34°18′02″N 134°14′15″E	1	
Tomita Chausuyama Kofun 富田茶臼山古墳; Tomita Chausuyama kofun	Sanuki	largest kofun in Kagawa		34°15′36″N 134°14′38″E	1	
Nakadera temple ruins 中寺廃寺跡; Nakadera haiji ato	Mannō	Heian period temple ruins		34°07′30″N 133°54′58″E	3	
Ninomiya Kiln ruins 二ノ宮窯跡; Ninomiya kama ato	Mitoyo	Nara period kiln ruins		34°08′52″N 133°45′17″E	6	
Hiketa Castle ruins 引田城跡; Hiketa-jō ato	Higashikagawa	Sengoku period castle ruins		34°14′02″N 134°24′30″E	2	
Fuchū-Yamanouchi Tile Kiln ruins 府中・山内瓦窯跡; Fuchū-Yamanouchi kawara-gama ato	Sakaide, Takamatsu	Nara period kiln ruins		34°17′39″N 133°56′19″E	6	
Marugame Castle 丸亀城跡; Marugame-jō ato	Marugame	Edo Period Castle		34°17′10″N 133°48′01″E	2	
Muneyoshi Tile Kiln ruins 宗吉瓦窯跡; Muneyoshi gayō ato	Mitoyo	Asuka period tile kiln ruins		34°11′34″N 133°41′57″E	6	
Yashima 屋島; Yashima	Takamatsu	site of the Battle of Yashima and of Yashima-ji, 84th temple of the Shikoku pilgrimage; also a Natural Monument		34°21′06″N 134°06′29″E	2, 3	
Katsuga Castle 勝賀城跡; Katsuga-jō ato	Takamatsu			34°20′27″N 133°58′51″E		

== Prefectural Historic Sites ==
As of 1 May 2023, twenty-nine Sites have been designated as being of prefectural importance.

Site	Municipality	Comments	Image	Coordinates	Type	Ref.
Kangi-in Tile Kiln Site 歓喜院内の瓦窯跡; Kangi-in kawara kama ato	Mitoyo			34°10′23″N 133°44′51″E		for all refs see
Ikoma Chikamasa and his Wife's Graves 生駒親正夫妻墓所; Ikoma Chikamasa fusai bosho	Takamatsu	at Kōken-ji (弘憲寺)		34°20′52″N 134°02′25″E		
Imaoka Kofun 今岡古墳; Imaoka kofun	Takamatsu			34°19′51″N 133°59′20″E		
Kozutajima Shell Mound 小蔦島貝塚; Kozutajima kaizuka	Mitoyo			34°11′34″N 133°38′06″E		
Tomioka Kofun Cluster 富丘古墳群; Tomioka kofun-gun	Tonoshō			34°29′08″N 134°11′45″E		
Iyadani-ji Faith Site 弥谷寺信仰遺跡; Iyadaniji shinkō iseki	Mitoyo	Temple 71 on the Shikoku pilgrimage		34°13′47″N 133°43′27″E		
Masuehata Tile Kiln Site ますえ畑瓦窯跡; Masuehata kawara kama ato	Ayagawa			34°15′51″N 133°56′26″E		
Subetsu Kiln Site すべつと窯跡; Subetsu kama ato	Ayagawa			34°15′54″N 133°56′57″E		
Tsujji Fudaba 辻の札場; Tsuji no fudaba	Mitoyo			34°12′03″N 133°38′44″E		
Yoshikane Kiln Site 吉金窯跡; Yoshikane kama ato	Sanuki			34°16′46″N 134°12′40″E		
Shirotori Haiji Site 白鳥廃寺跡; Shirotori Haiji ato	Higashikagawa			34°14′34″N 134°20′40″E		
Stones for Osaka Castle and Shichibe Banya Residence Site 大坂城用残石及番屋七兵衛屋敷跡; Ōsakajō-yō zanseki oyobi banya Shichibe yashiki ato	Shōdoshima			34°30′16″N 134°20′52″E		
Takamatsu Chausuyama Kofun 高松市茶臼山古墳; Takamatsu Chausuyama kofun	Takamatsu			34°18′32″N 134°06′11″E		
Kaihō-ji Pagoda Site 開法寺塔跡; Kaihōji tō ato	Sakaide			34°17′32″N 133°55′02″E		
Tao Chausuyama Kofun 田尾茶臼山古墳; Tao Chausuyama kofun	Sakaide, Utazu			34°18′43″N 133°50′19″E		
Shamijima Senninzuka 沙弥島千人塚; Shamijima Senninzuka	Sakaide			34°20′46″N 133°49′22″E		
Stone Quarries for Osaka Castle (Tobietsu Chōba Site) and Omi Stones 大坂城石垣石切とび越丁場跡および小海残石群; Ōsaka-jō ishigaki ishi-kiri Tobietsu chōba ato oyobi Omi zanseki-gun	Shōdoshima	see Osaka Castle Zanseki Memorial Park (大坂城残石記念公園, Ōsaka-jō zanseki kinen kōen)		34°32′02″N 134°14′32″E		
Stone Quarries for Osaka Castle (Senge Chōba Site) 大坂城石垣石切千軒丁場跡; Ōsaka-jō ishigaki ishi-kiri Senge chōba ato	Shōdoshima			34°27′45″N 134°09′11″E		
Stone Quarries for Osaka Castle (Kosehara Chōba Site) 大坂城石垣石切小瀬原丁場跡; Ōsaka-jō ishigaki ishi-kiri Kosehara chōba ato	Shōdoshima			34°32′00″N 134°14′31″E		
Hoshigajō Site 星が城跡; Hoshigajō ato	Shōdoshima			34°30′54″N 134°19′03″E		
Zentsū-ji Old Precinct 善通寺旧境内; Zentsūji kyū-keidai	Zentsūji	75th temple of the Shikoku pilgrimage		34°13′30″N 133°46′26″E		
Jinnomaru Kofun 陣の丸古墳; Jinnomaru kofun	Marugame			34°15′28″N 133°53′40″E		
Akaokayama Kofun 赤岡山古墳; Akaokayama kofun	Kan'onji			34°05′04″N 133°41′02″E		
Minami-Kusaki Site 南草木遺跡; Minami-Kusaki iseki	Mitoyo			34°12′03″N 133°38′50″E		
Moritsuchiyama Kofun 盛土山古墳; Moritsuchiyama kofun	Tadotsu			34°14′54″N 133°44′12″E		
Kōryū-ji Site Stone Tō 興隆寺跡石塔群; Kōryūji ato sekitō-gun	Mitoyo			34°10′01″N 133°40′23″E		
Aonoyama No.1 Kiln Site 青ノ山一号窯跡; Aonoyama ichi-gō kama ato	Marugame			34°17′33″N 133°49′27″E		
Kasajima Castle Site 笠島城跡; Kasajima-jō ato	Marugame			34°23′41″N 133°47′22″E		
Shaminakandahama Site 沙弥ナカンダ浜遺跡; Shaminakandahama iseki	Sakaide			34°21′06″N 133°49′14″E		

== Municipal Historic Sites ==
As of 1 May 2023, a further one hundred and forty Sites have been designated as being of municipal importance.

== See also ==
- Cultural Properties of Japan
- Sanuki Province
- The Kagawa Museum
- List of Places of Scenic Beauty of Japan (Kagawa)
- List of Cultural Properties of Japan - paintings (Kagawa)
