= Takamatsu Matsudaira clan cemetery =

Cemetery in Kagawa Prefecture, Japan

- 高松藩主松平家墓所
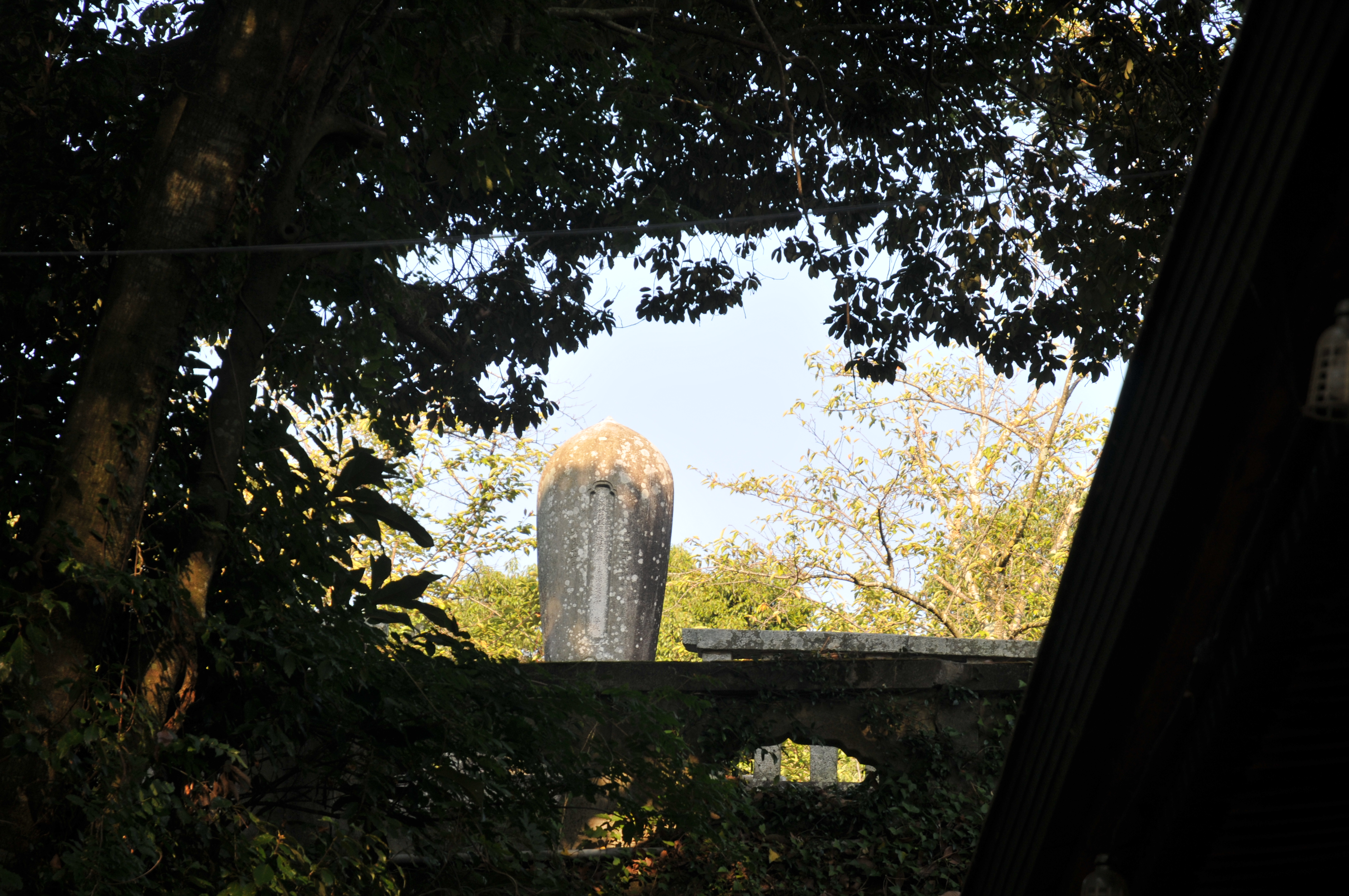
- Busshozan Honen-ji

Details
- Established: 1642
- Location: Takamatsu, Kagawa
- Country: Japan
- Type: daimyō cemetery
- Owned by: Honen-ji
- Footnotes: National Historic Site of Japan
- Mito Tokugawa clan cemetery (Kagawa Prefecture) Mito Tokugawa clan cemetery (Japan)

The Takamatsu Matsudaira clan cemetery (高松藩主松平家墓所, Takamatsu-han Matsudaira-ke bosho) is located in the city of Takamatsu, Kagawa. The cemetery contains the graves of the Takamatsu-branch of age Matsudaira clan. This includes the successive daimyō of Takamatsu Domain (120,000 koku). The cemetery was designated a National Historic Site in 2007.

== Overview ==
The Mito-Tokugawa clan descended from Tokugawa Yorifusa, the 11th son of Tokugawa Ieyasu and was one of the Gosanke branches of the Tokugawa clan, who were maintained to provide a shōgun should the main line of the clan die out. In 1642, Matsudaira Yorishige, the eldest son of Tokugawa Yorifusa, of Mito Domain, and daimyō of Shimodate Domain in Hitachi Province was transferred to Takamatsu Castle and given a fief of 120,000 koku, in eastern Sanuki Province. It is said that Yorishige was given this position at the express request of his cousin, Shogun Tokugawa Iemitsu, with whom he was on very good terms.

The clan cemetery is located that their bodaiji of Honen-ji consists of 202 tombs of seven daimyō. In addition to the tomb of Matsudaira Yorishige, the tombs of the 3rd daimyō, Matsudaira Yoritoyo through the 8th daimyō Matsudaira Yorinori, along with the tombs of their official wives, and various relatives and children are located in this cemetery. The tombs are arranged on a hill with that of Matsudaira Yorishige in the highest location, and subsequent tombs arrayed both hierarchy, with the size of each monument and its position relative to that of the corresponding daimyō clearly divided according to the status during life, as well as specially, according to the prefects of Pure Land Buddhism, of which Matsudaira Yorishige was a devotee. Most of the gravestones are Muhōtō-style, which are egg-shaped monuments more commonly used as the tombstones for Buddhist priests.

== See also ==
- List of Historic Sites of Japan (Kagawa)
