= Kibeejima Saltworks Site =

- 喜兵衛島製塩遺跡 (Japanese)
- Kibeejima Saltworks Site Kibeejima Saltworks Site (Japan)
- Interactive map of Kibeejima Saltworks Site
- 34°30′05″N 133°58′36″E
- Type: Kofun
- Periods: Kofun period
- Location: Naoshima, Kagawa, Japan
- Region: Shikoku

History
- Built: c.4th century

Site notes
- Public access: None

The Kibeejima Saltworks Site (喜兵衛島製塩遺跡, Kibējima Seyen Iseki)]) is an archaeological site with the traces of a Kofun period saltworks located in on the island of Kibējima, which is administratively part of the town of Naoshima, Kagawa Prefecture, Japan. It was designated a National Historic Site in 1979.

== Overview ==
Kibējima is a small uninhabited island in the Seto Inland Sea, located about two kilometers east of Uno Port in Tamano, Okayama. The island is long from east-to-west, with four sandy beaches, two on each of the north and south banks. Kofun period pottery, known as Shiraku-style pottery, which is used in salt-making, has been found on each beach. Archaeological excavations conducted since 1954 have found more than five hearths on the southeast beach. These hearths are oval-shaped, measuring about three meters in length and 1.5 meters in width, and are covered with flat stones. There is a hard surface around the hearths, and a large amount of salt-making pottery has been discarded outside of it. Many pottery vessels believed to have been used in daily life have been excavated near the hillside, suggesting they were dwelling places. There are also a dozen kofun burial mounds on the hillside from the 6th to early 7th centuries, and in addition to Haji ware, Sue ware, and ironware, nearly complete salt-making pottery vessels were excavated as grave goods.

== See also ==
- List of Historic Sites of Japan (Kagawa)
