= Katsuga Castle =

Cultural heritage site

- 勝賀城
- Takamatsu, Kagawa Prefecture, Japan

Site information
- Type: yamashiro-style Japanese castle
- Owner: Kōzai clan
- Condition: ruins

Location
- Location within Kagawa Prefecture Location within Japan
- Coordinates: 34°20′25.9″N 133°58′50.3″E

Site history
- Built: 1221
- Built by: Kōzai Sukemura
- Demolished: 1585
- National Historic Site of Japan

Katsuga Castle (勝賀城, Katsuga-jō) was a yamashiro-style Japanese castle located ion Katsugayama, west of the city center of modern Takamatsu City, Kagawa Prefecture, Japan. Its ruins have been protected as a Takamatsu City designated historic site from August 6, 1980 and as a National Historic Site since 2024.

== Overview ==
Katsuga Castle was the stronghold of the Kōzai clan, a powerful clan in Sanuki Province from the Kamakura period into the Sengoku period and was their main castle for nearly 360 years. The Kōzai clan's peacetime fortified residence Saryō Castle was located at the base of Kasugayama under the Katsuga Castle.

In 1221, Fujiwara Suemura, who distinguished himself in the Jōkyū War, was appointed governor of Kagawa and Aya counties by the Kamakura shogunate, built a mountain fortress on Katsugayama and changed his name to "Kōzai". During the Muromachi period, the clan played an important role as vassals to the Hosokawa clan, nominal rulers Shikoku, and also cooperated with the Murakami clan, who controlled the sea routes on the Seto Inland Sea. This led to the prosperity of the castle town at Katsuga and its port. However, this prosperity came to an end when the Hosokawa were overthrown by the Miyoshi clan, and the aggressive Chosokabe Motochika of Tosa Province invaded from the south. Although the Kōzai retreated to the more defensible Fujio Castle and made peace with the Chosakabe, the clan was destroyed in 1585 during Toyotomi Hideyoshi's conquest of Shikoku.

Currently, remains such as earthworks and wells remain on the mountain.

== See also ==
- List of Historic Sites of Japan (Kagawa)

== Literature ==
- De Lange, William (2021). An Encyclopedia of Japanese Castles. Groningen: Toyo Press. pp. 600 pages. ISBN 978-9492722300.
- Schmorleitz, Morton S. (1974). Castles in Japan. Tokyo: Charles E. Tuttle Co. pp. 144–145. ISBN 0-8048-1102-4.
- Turnbull, Stephen (2003). Japanese Castles 1540-1640. Osprey Publishing. p. 64 pages. ISBN 1-84176-429-9.
