= Kiyama Castle =

Castle ruins in Sakaide, Japan

- 城山城
- Sakaide, Kagawa, Kagawa Prefecture, Japan
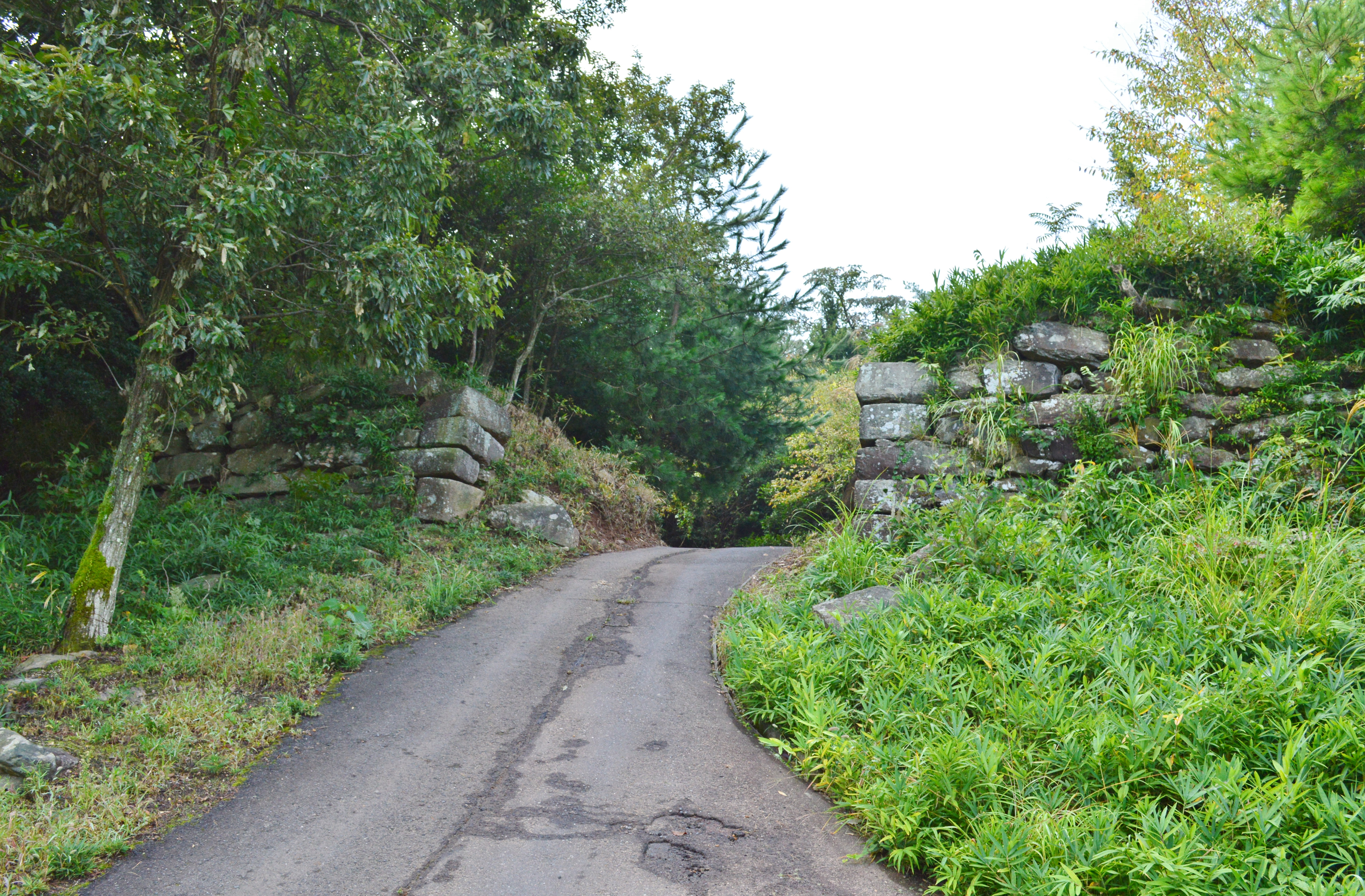
- Stone wall and Gate of Kiyama

Site information
- Type: Korean-style fortress
- Condition: Ruins

Location
- Coordinates: 34°17′22.94″N 133°53′23.17″E

Site history
- Built: 668-670
- Built by: Yamato court
- In use: Asuka - Nara period
- National Historic Site of Japan

Kiyama Castle (城山城, Kiyama-jō) was an ancient castle (also known as a Korean-style fortresses in Japan (朝鮮式山城, Chōsen-shiki yamajiro) located in the city of Sakaide, Kagawa, Japan, and extending partly into the neighboring city of Marugame. Its ruins have been protected as a National Historic Site since 1951. It is also known as Shiroyama Castle or Sanuki-Shiroyama Castle.

== History ==
After the defeat of the combined Baekje and Yamato Japan forces, at the hands of the Silla and Tang China alliance at the Battle of Hakusukinoe in 663, the Yamato court feared an invasion from either or both Tang or Silla. In response, they built a huge network of shore fortifications throughout the rest of the 600s, often with the assistance of Baekje engineers, generals and artisans. Unaware of the outbreak of the Silla-Tang War (670–676), the Japanese would continue to build fortifications until 701, after finding out that Silla was no longer friendly with Tang. Kiyama is one such fortification.

Kiyama is located on Mount Shiroyama (elevation 462 meters), which is part of the Setonaikai National Park, and which straddles the border between Sakaide and Marugame in northern Kagawa Prefecture. The castle does not appear in written literature, and its name is taken from the name of the mountain. At present, a golf course (Takamatsu Country Club) occupies the site and the ruins, including the remnants of gates and stone walls are scattered around the grounds. At the foot of the mountain is the presumed location of the provincial capital of ancient Sanuki Province.

As Kiyama is not mentioned in any documents, its chronology is unclear and archaeological excavations have uncovered few relics. Its layout and design of walls place it as one of many similar fortifications extending across the northern part of Kyushu and in other locations along the coast of the Seto Inland Sea, including Einōsan Castle and Yashima, as well as Ki castle in Okayama Prefecture on the opposite bank of the Seto Inland Sea. This location allowed it to monitor maritime traffic and was a key point access to Sanuki and the hinterlands of Shikoku. Shiroyama Shrine, a Shinto Shrine located at the foot of the mountain appears in historical records in the ninth century, and appears to have been an ancient facility related to the castle.

The castle consisted of two concentric bands of walls encircling the top of the mountain.The inner wall extends for 3.5 kilometers and is mostly earthwork, measuring 1.5 to two meters in height and six to seven meters in width. Only the sides of gates were reinforced with stone. The outer wall extends for 4.2 kilometers, and is around one meter in height and three meters in width. However, there is also a theory that Shiroyama Castle is not completed because the top foundation stones are scattered at irregular intervals.

There are little remains of the castle on the present day site, just some stone walls and earthworks.

== Access ==
The site is about 15 minutes by car from Kamogawa Station on the JR Shikoku Yosan Line.

== Gallery ==
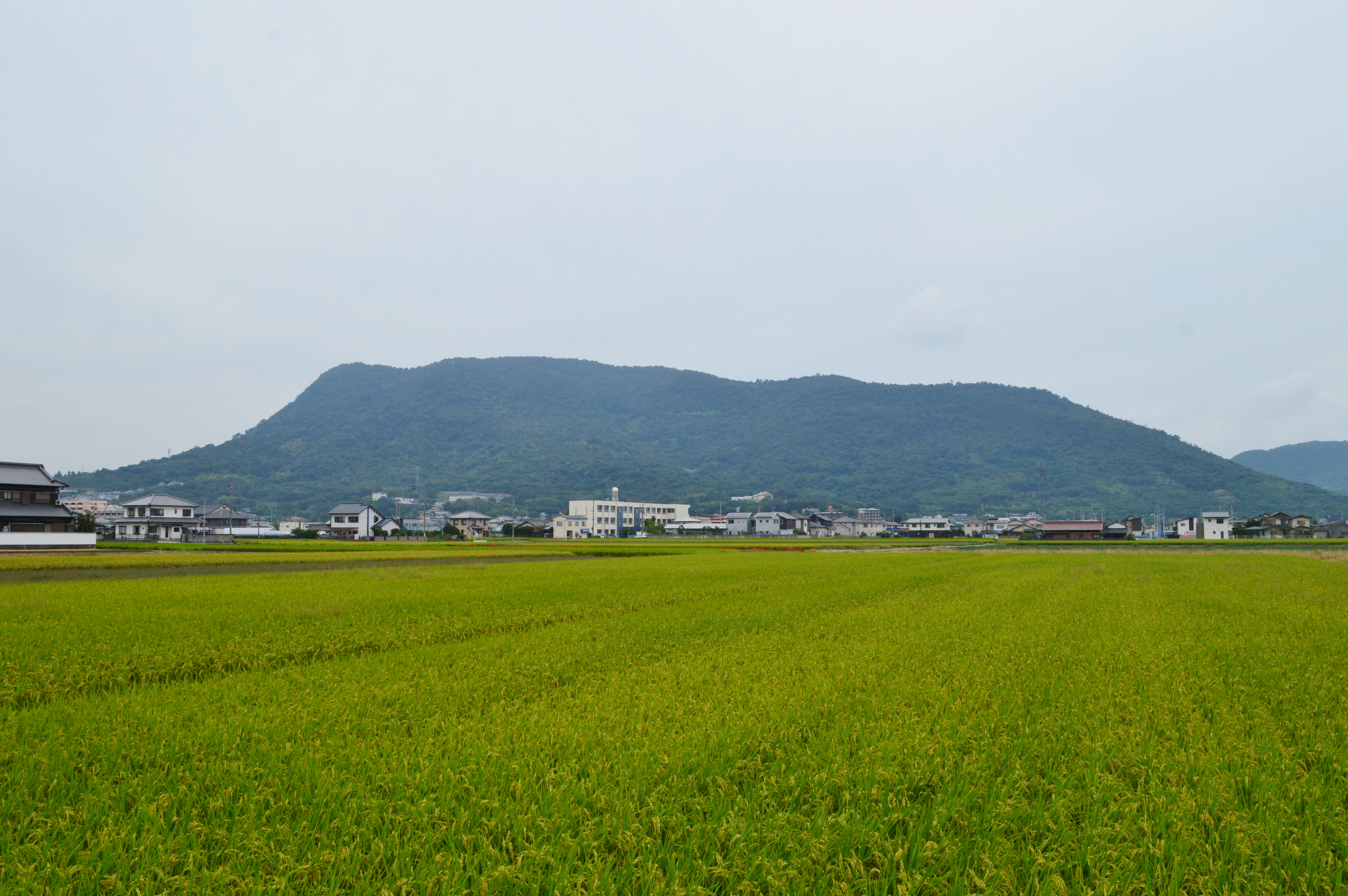
Kiyama

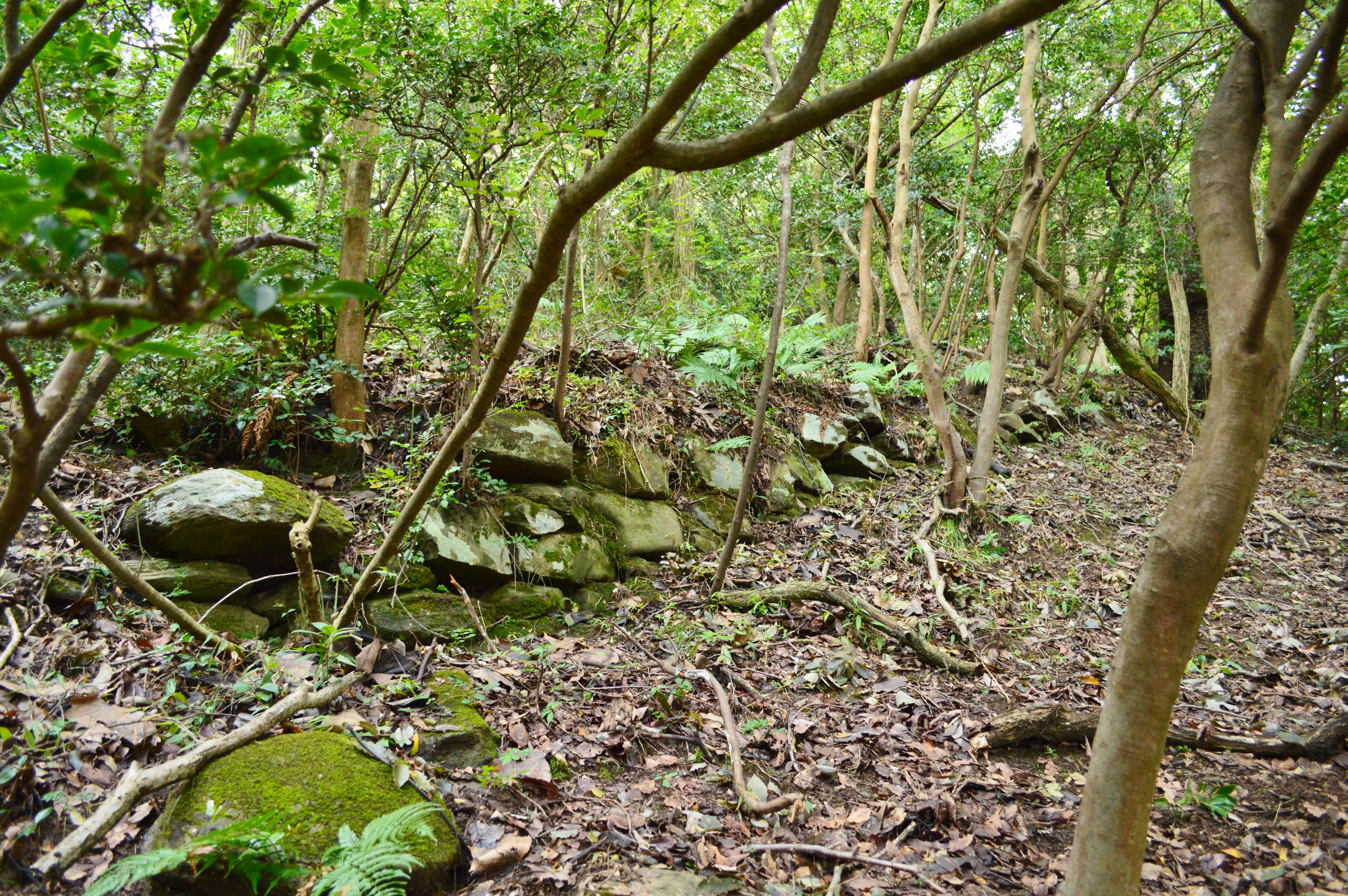
Stone wall of Kiyama

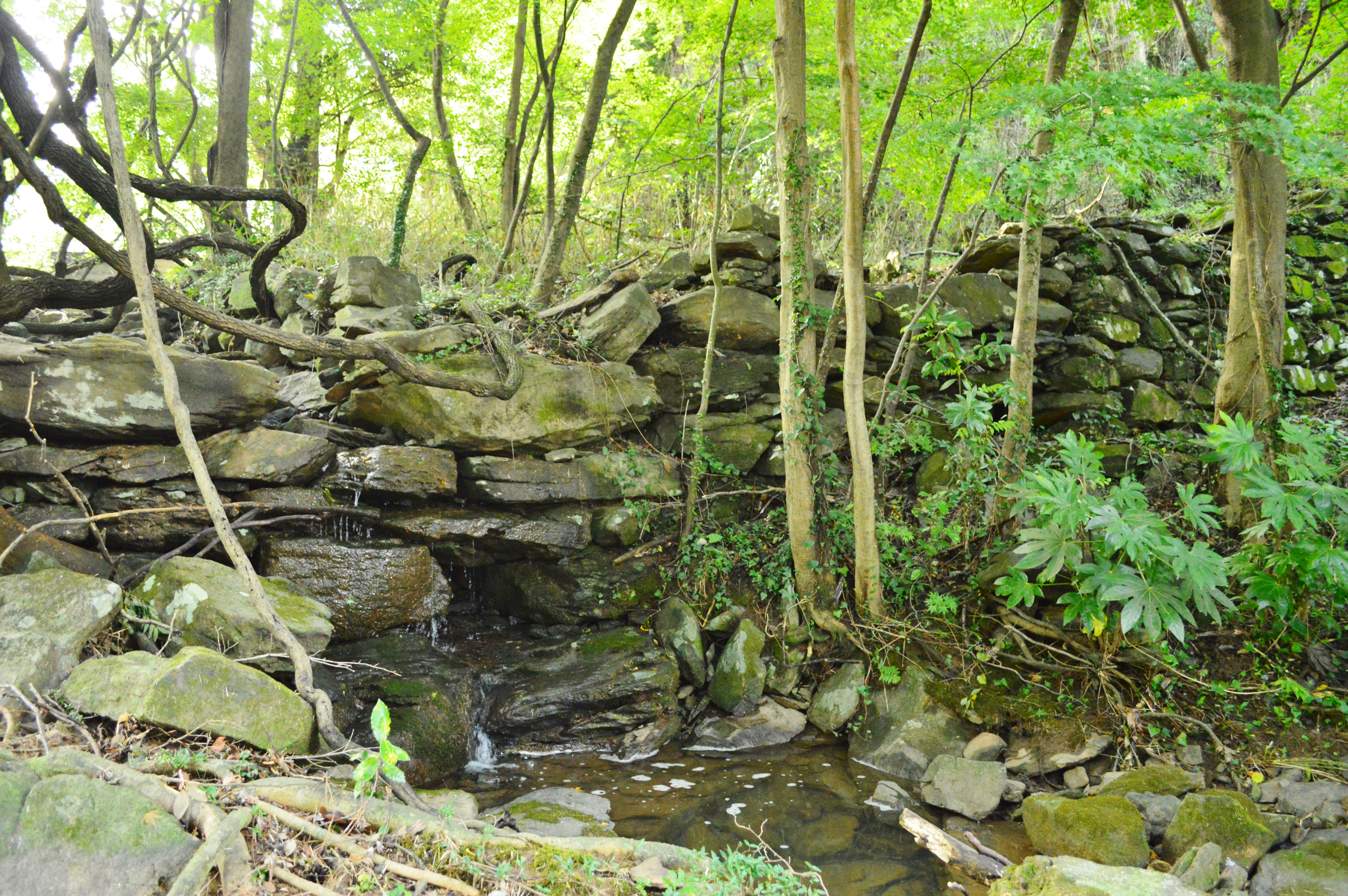
Water gate

== See also ==
- List of Historic Sites of Japan (Kagawa)
- List of foreign-style castles in Japan
- Kōgoishi

== Literature ==
- De Lange, William (2021). An Encyclopedia of Japanese Castles. Groningen: Toyo Press. pp. 600 pages. ISBN 978-9492722300.
- Motoo, Hinago (1986). Japanese Castles. Tokyo: Kodansha. pp. 200 pages. ISBN 0-87011-766-1.
