= Sanuki Mountains =

Mountain range in Shokoku, Japan

Coordinates: 34°06′56″N 134°02′54″E

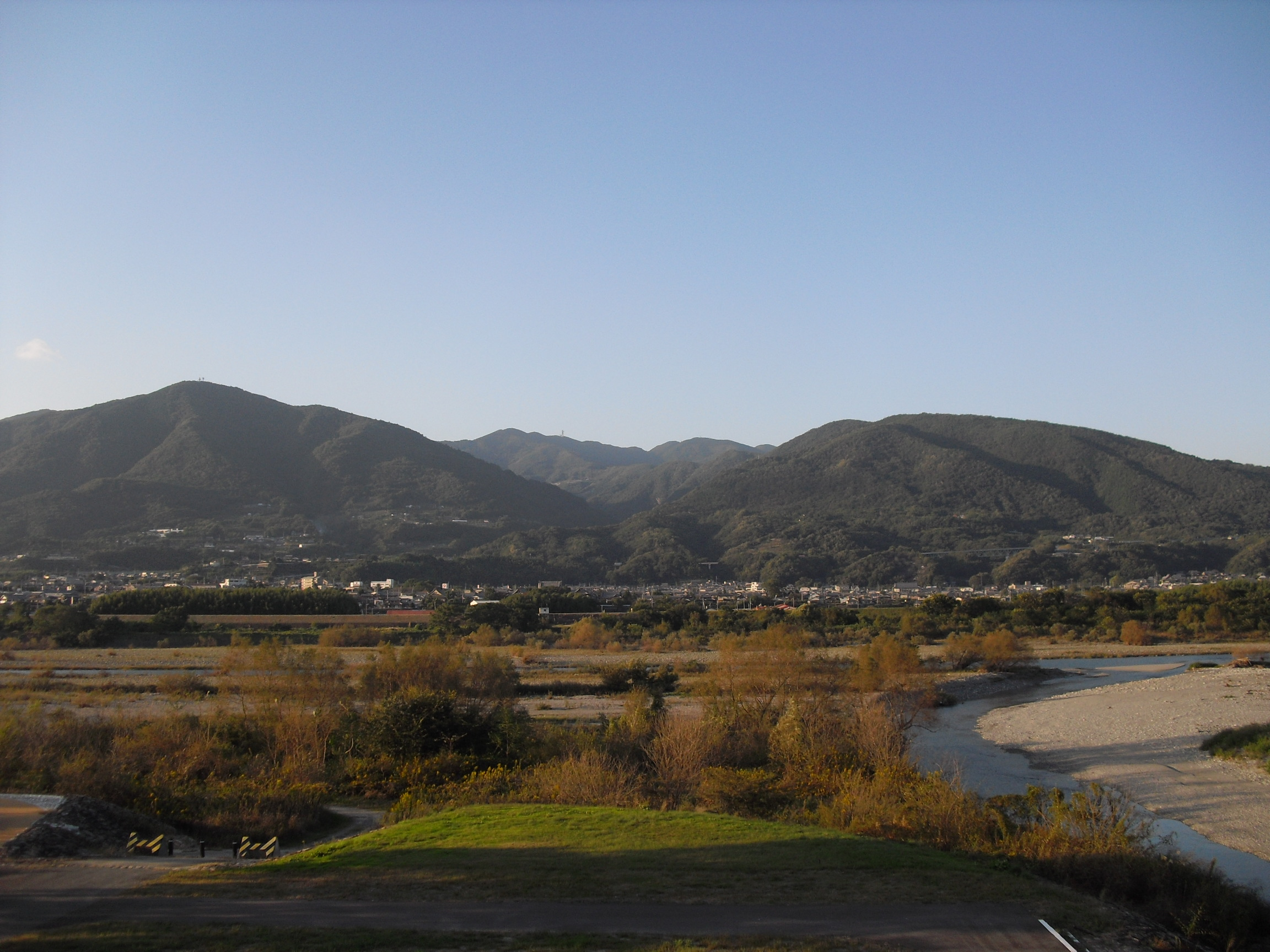
Mt. Ryūō in the Sanuki Mountains

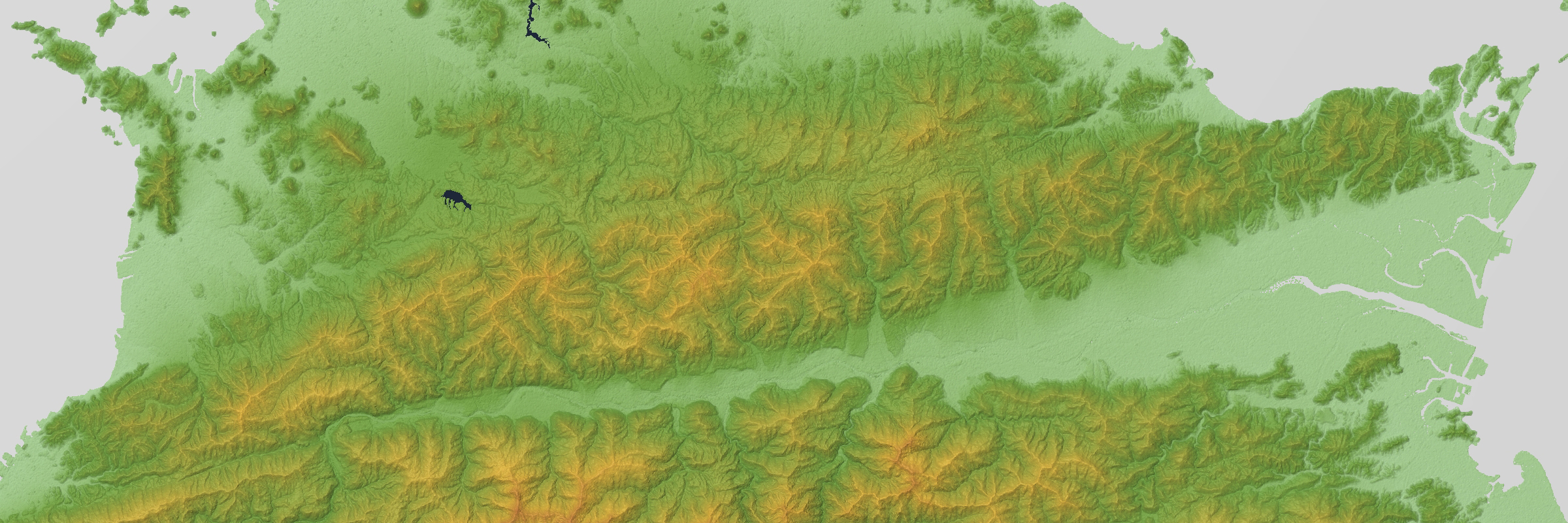
Topographic map of Sanuki Mountains

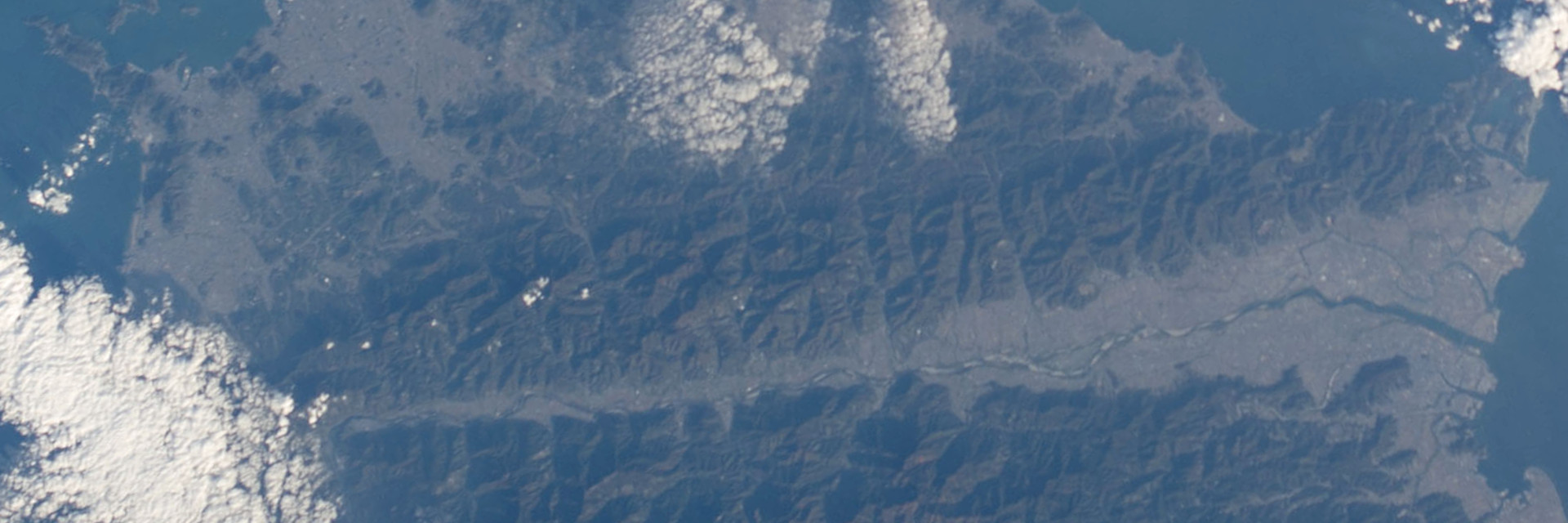
Sanuki Mountains from ISS

The Sanuki Mountains (讃岐山脈, Sanuki-sanmyaku) are a mountain range running along the southern border of Kagawa and the northern border of Tokushima prefectures on the island of Shikoku, Japan.

The highest peak is Mt. Ryūō (竜王山, Ryūō-zan) at 1059.9 m.

Parts of the mountains are included within the Ōtaki-Ōkawa Prefectural Natural Park.
