= Sanuki Kokubun-ji =

Buddhist temple in Kagawa Prefecture, Japan

- 讃岐国分寺
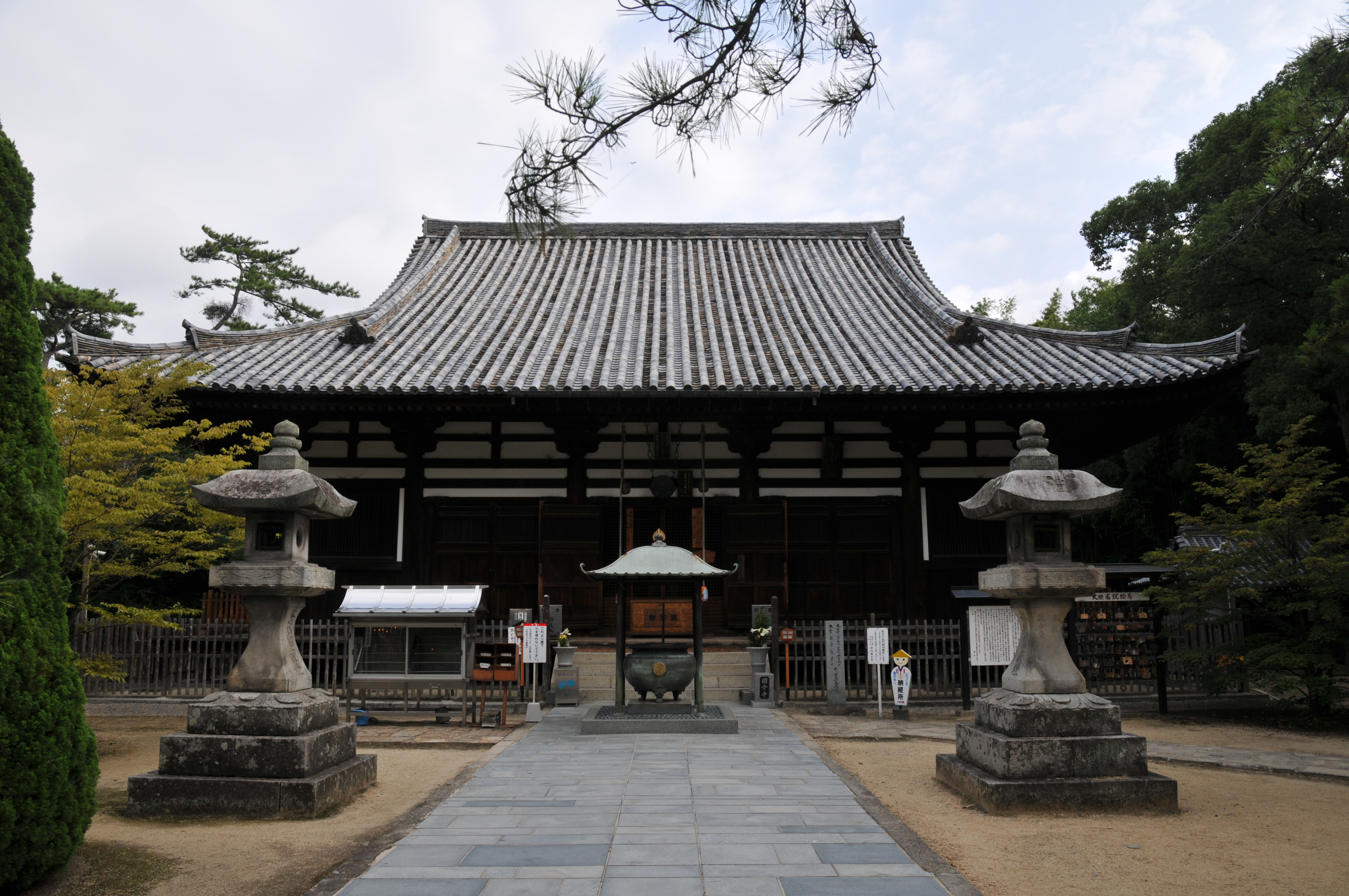
- Hondō (1275-1332), Important Cultural Property

- Sanuki Kokubun-ji Sanuki Kokubun-ji (Japan)

Religion
- Affiliation: Buddhist
- Deity: Senjū Kannon
- Rite: Shingon Omuro-ha

Location
- Location: 2065 Kokubu, Kokubunji-cho, Takamatsu-shi, Kagawa-ken
- Country: Japan
- Interactive map of Sanuki Kokubun-ji
- Coordinates: 34°18′11″N 133°56′39″E

Architecture
- Founder: Gyōki
- Completed: 741

Website
- Official website
- National Important Cultural Property Special National Historic Site of Japan

Sanuki Kokubun-ji (讃岐国分寺) is a Buddhist temple located in the Kokubunji-cho neighborhood of the city of Takamatsu, Kagawa Prefecture, Japan. It is a head temple of the Omuro-branch of the Shingon sect, and its honzon is a statue of Senjū Jūichimen Kannon. Its full name is Hakugyū-zan Senjū-in Kokubun-ji (白牛山千手院国分寺). It is the successor to the Nara period provincial temple of former Sanuki Province and Temple 80 on the Shikoku 88 temple pilgrimage. The precincts have been designated a Special Historic Site.

== Overview ==
The Sanuki Kokubun-ji is located in the west of Takamatsu City, south of the Kokubundai Hills. It is located two kilometers east of the presumed site of the Sanuki Kokufu site, and the surrounding area is the center of Sanuki Province, where many ruins have been excavated. The current temple grounds overlap with the foundations of the temple buildings at the time of its founding, which are in a good state of preservation among the remains of kokubunji temples in the country. In addition, the main hall, the principal image, and the bronze bell are designated as National Important Cultural Properties.

== History ==
According to temple legend, the temple founded by Gyōki in 741, with a 4.85 meter Eleven-Headed Thousand-Armed Kannon Bodhisattva as its principal image (the existing principal image is not from that time, but remains the largest statue in the Shikoku Pilgrimage). The temple only appears in historical records in 756 with an entry in the Nihon Shoki: "Buddhist implements and other items were bestowed on the provincial temples of 26 provinces, including Sanuki Province".

A document from 1391 states that the temple was a branch temple of Saidai-ji, and other documents indicate that it fallen into ruin before the end of the Kamakura period, and was restored by monks from Saidai-ji. Most of the temple was burned down during the wars of the Sengoku period, leaving only the Main Hall, the principal image, and the bell tower. During the Edo period, the temple received support from the daimyō of Takamatsu Domain.

The temple grounds from the Nara period, as revealed by archaeological excavations between 1983 and 1991, were 240 meters north-to-south and 220 meters east-to-west, and encompassed the current temple as well as the neighboring Hōrin-ji temple to the east. The temple complex is laid out in the Daikandai-ji style, with the middle gate, main hall, and lecture hall lined up in a straight line north-to-south, and a pagoda was built on the east side of the inner section connecting the middle gate and the main hall with a corridor. The foundation stones of the main hall and the seven-story pagoda remain in their original locations. The main hall of the current Sanuki Kokubun-ji was built on the site of the Nara period lecture hall, and reuses the original foundation stones. Other remains of the corridor, monks' quarters, bell tower, a large 7x4 bay post-hole foundation building (of unknown purpose), and earthen wall have also been confirmed by excavations, and it is believed that there was also a middle gate and south gate. The original main hall was a seven by four bay structure, as was the lecture hall. The pagoda had a three by three bay foundation, from which its height of 63 meters can be estimated. Of the 17 foundation stones from the time of construction, 15 remain in their original locations. The monk's quarters were extensive: 21 bays in east-west and 3 bays in north-south. It was divided into seven units of three bays each by walls. The central three-bay by three-bay room was used as a common room such as a dining room, and the remaining six units had smaller rooms divided between the pillars, with each unit having four rooms, for a total of 24 rooms. The surrounding wall was 3.93 meters high, and It is also believed that a moat ran around the outside.

The old temple site has been developed as an archaeological park, where the temple from the Nara period has been reproduced in a 1/10 scale stone model, and part of the earthern wall has been restored to full size. The remains of the monks' quarters were in good condition, so the remains were covered with a roof and part of the building was restored. A museum exhibits finds from the site.

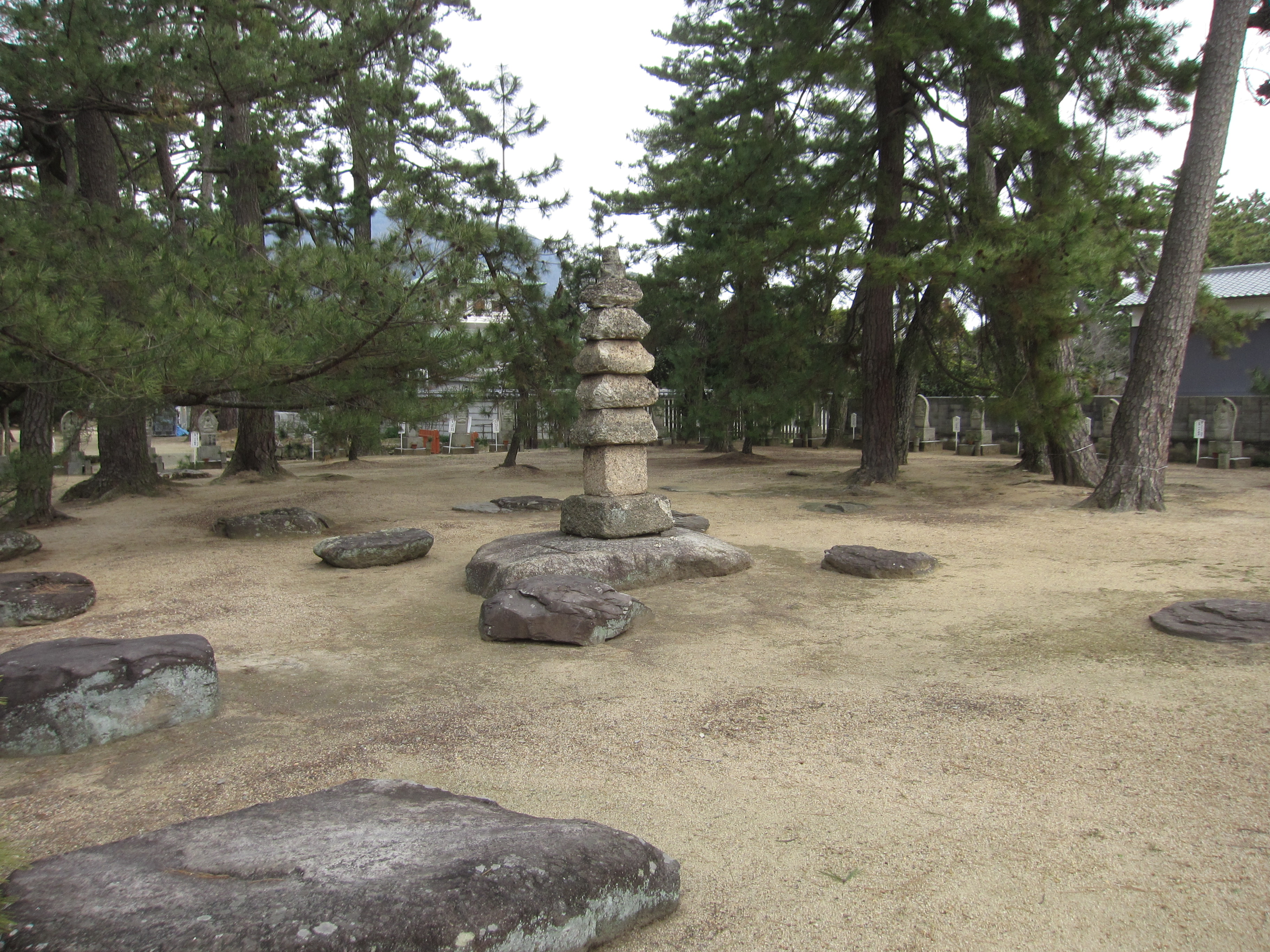
Site of the Pagoda

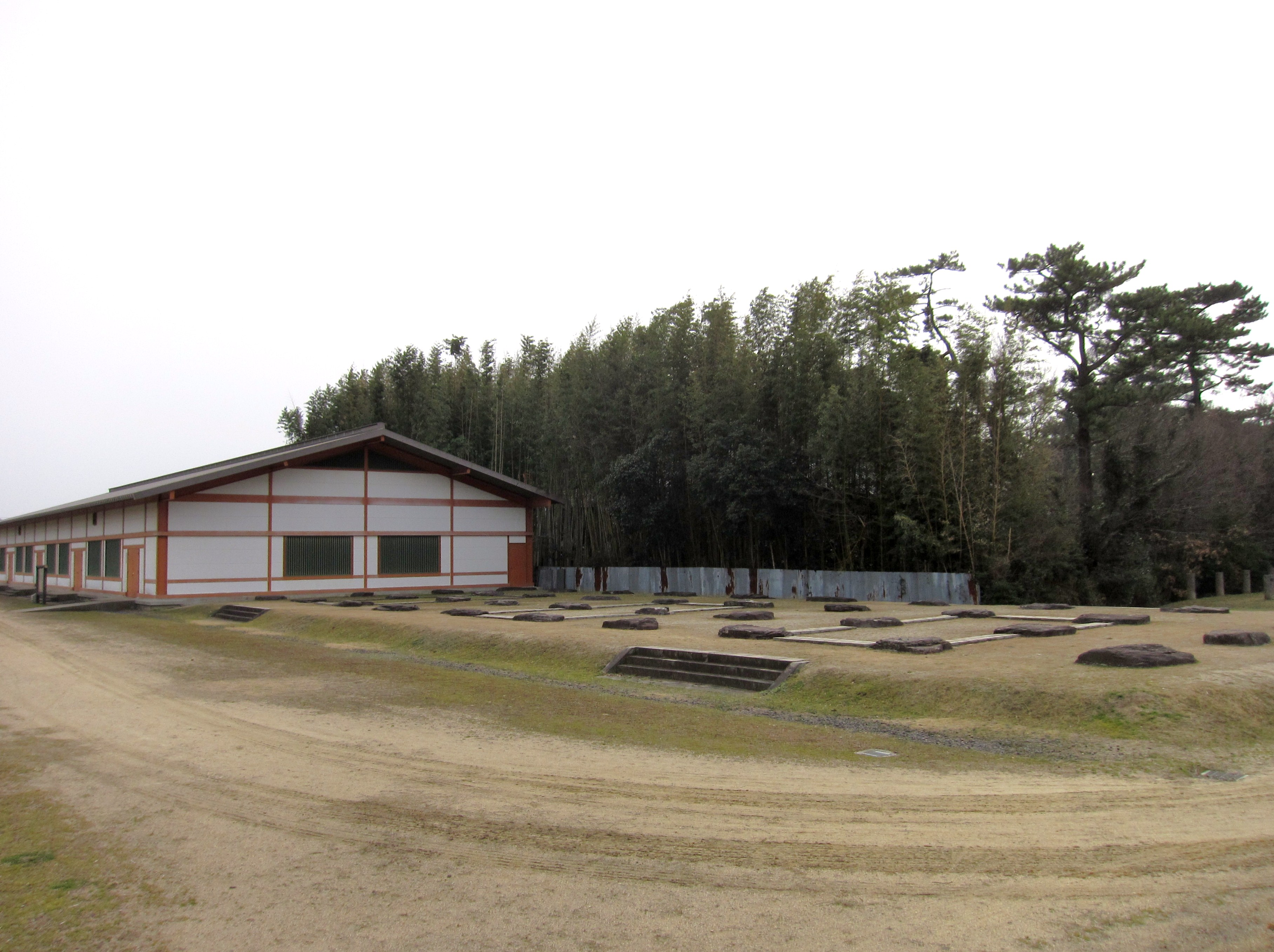
Site of the monk's quarters

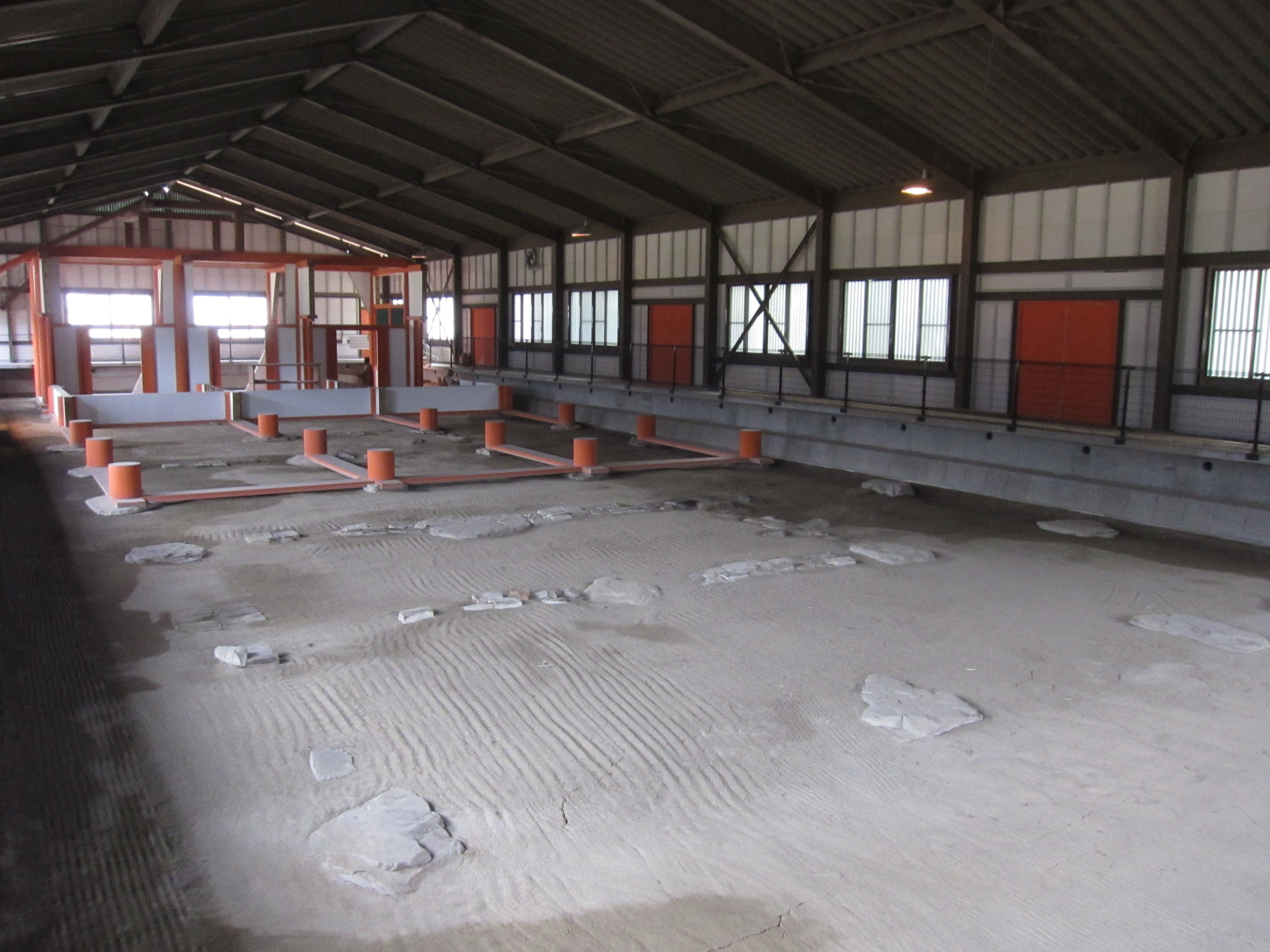
Site of the monk's quarters (interior)

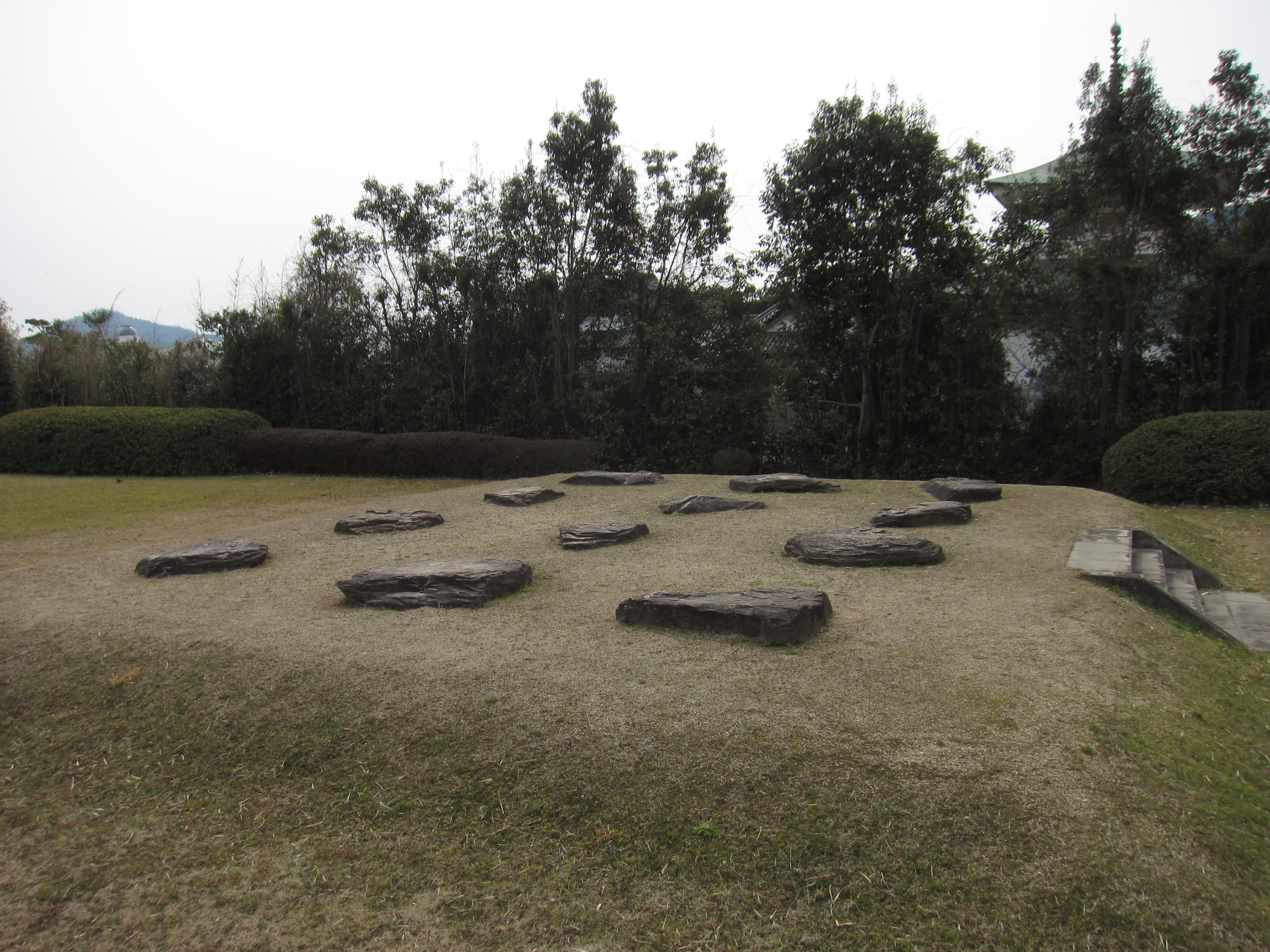
Site of the Bell Tower

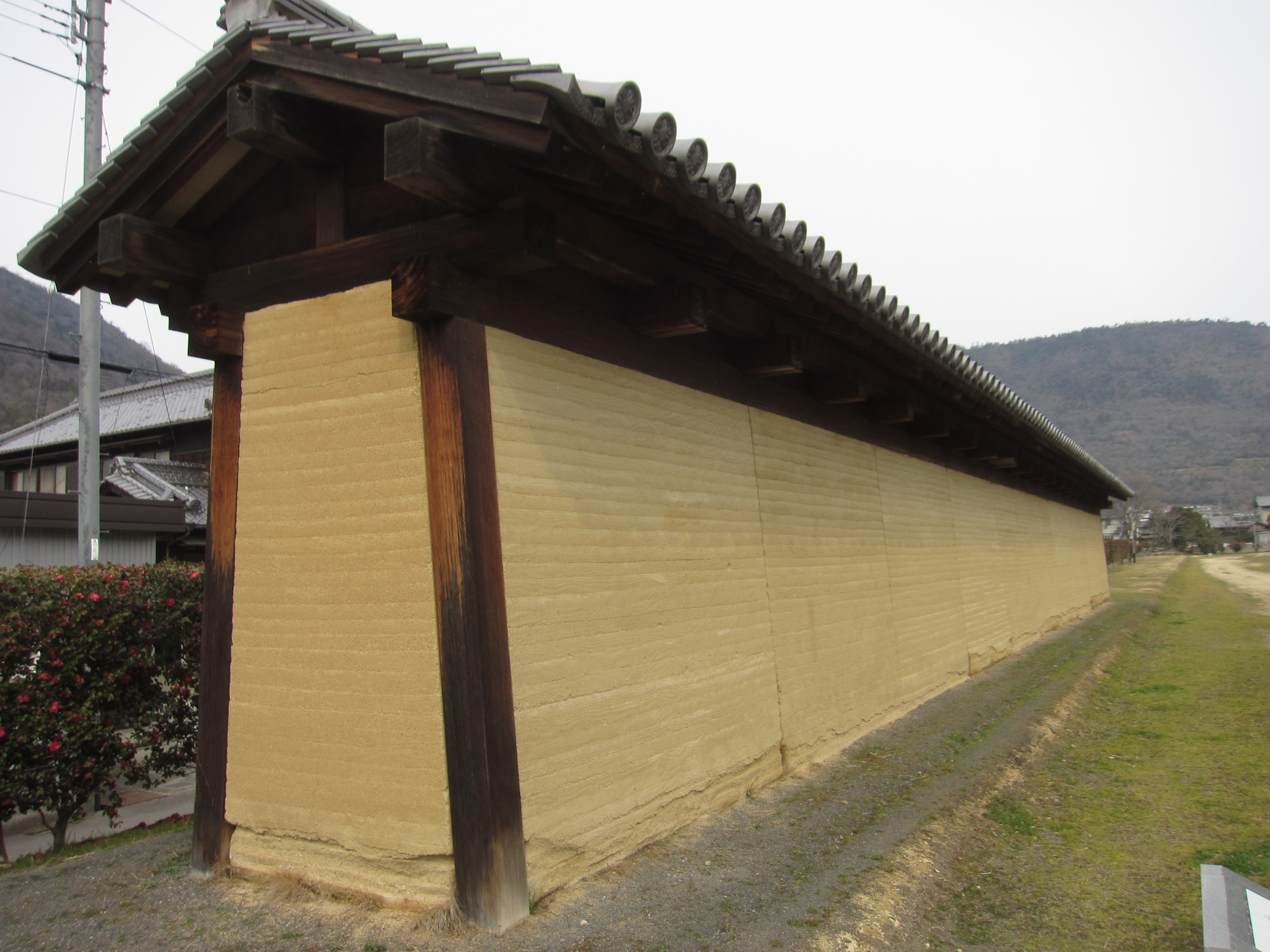
Earthern Wall（Reproduction）

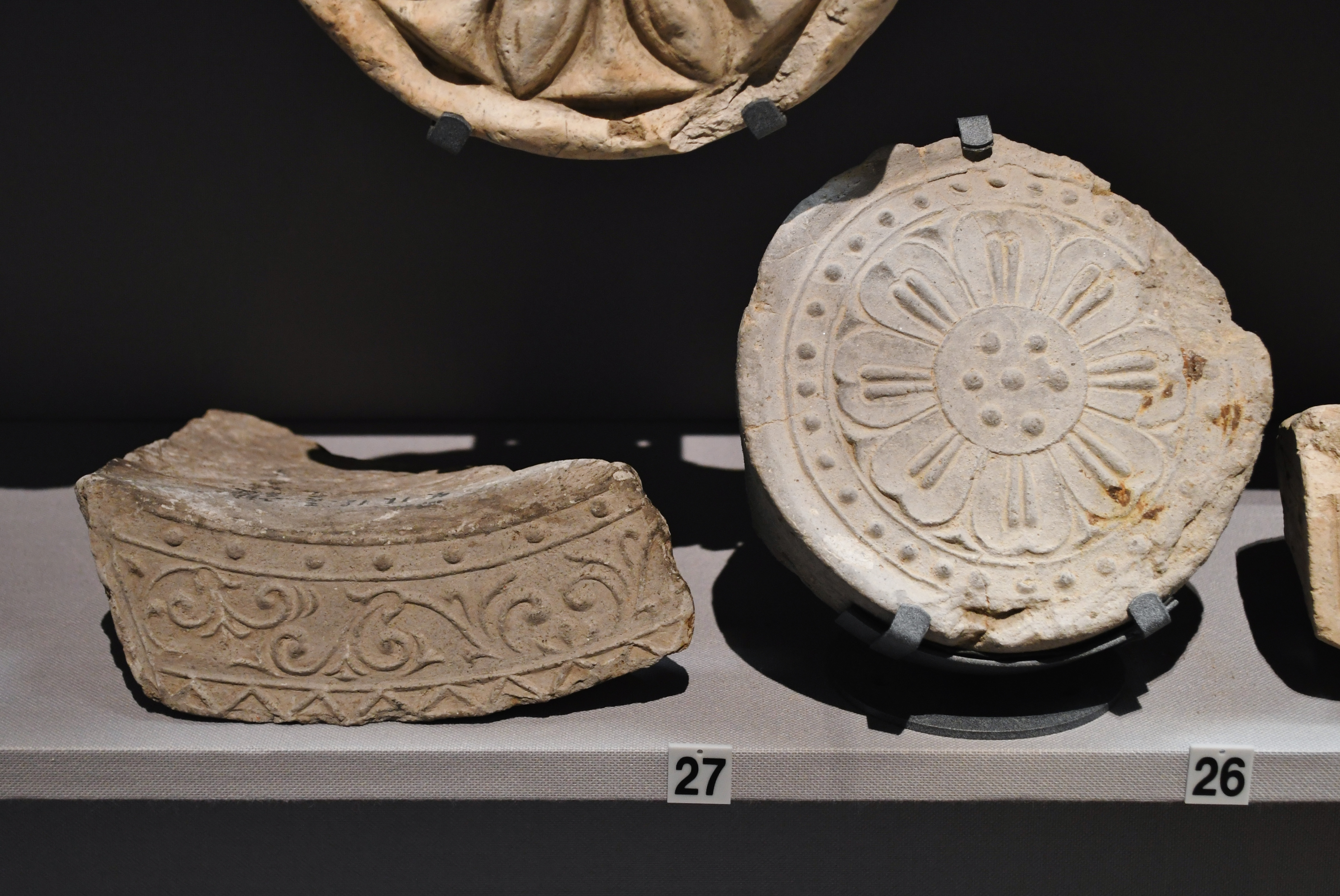
Roof tiles

== Cultural Properties ==
=== Important Cultural Properties ===
- Hondō (本堂), (late-Kamakura period); 5x5 bay, single-storey, irimoya-zukuri, tiled-roof;
- Wooden statue of standing Senjū Kannon (木造千手観音立像), (late-Heian to Muromachi period)
- Bonshō (梵鐘), (Heian period)

=== Takamatsu City Designated Tangible Cultural Properties ===
- Manirintō or 'dismounting stone' (City-designated Cultural Property)
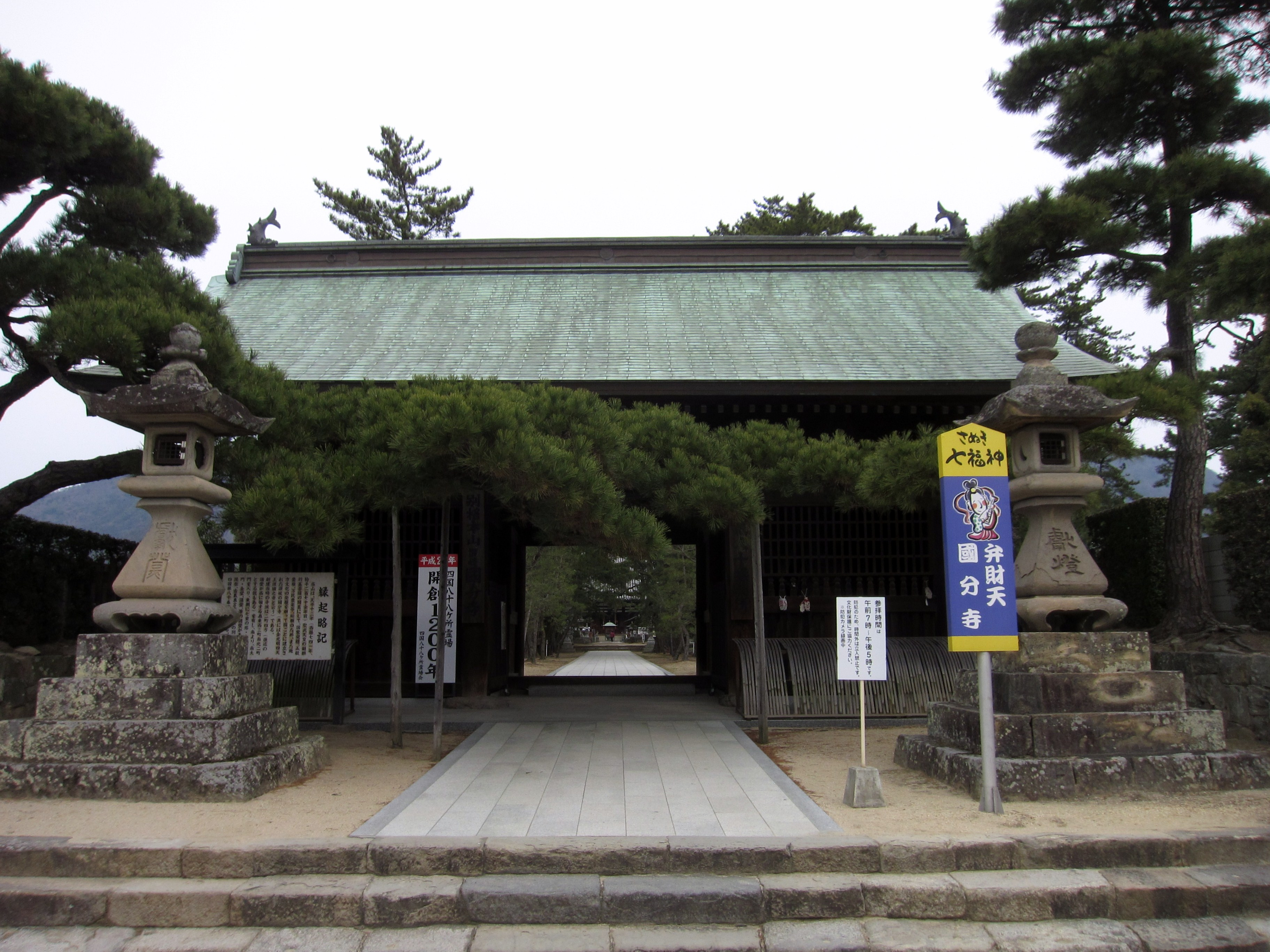
Niōmon

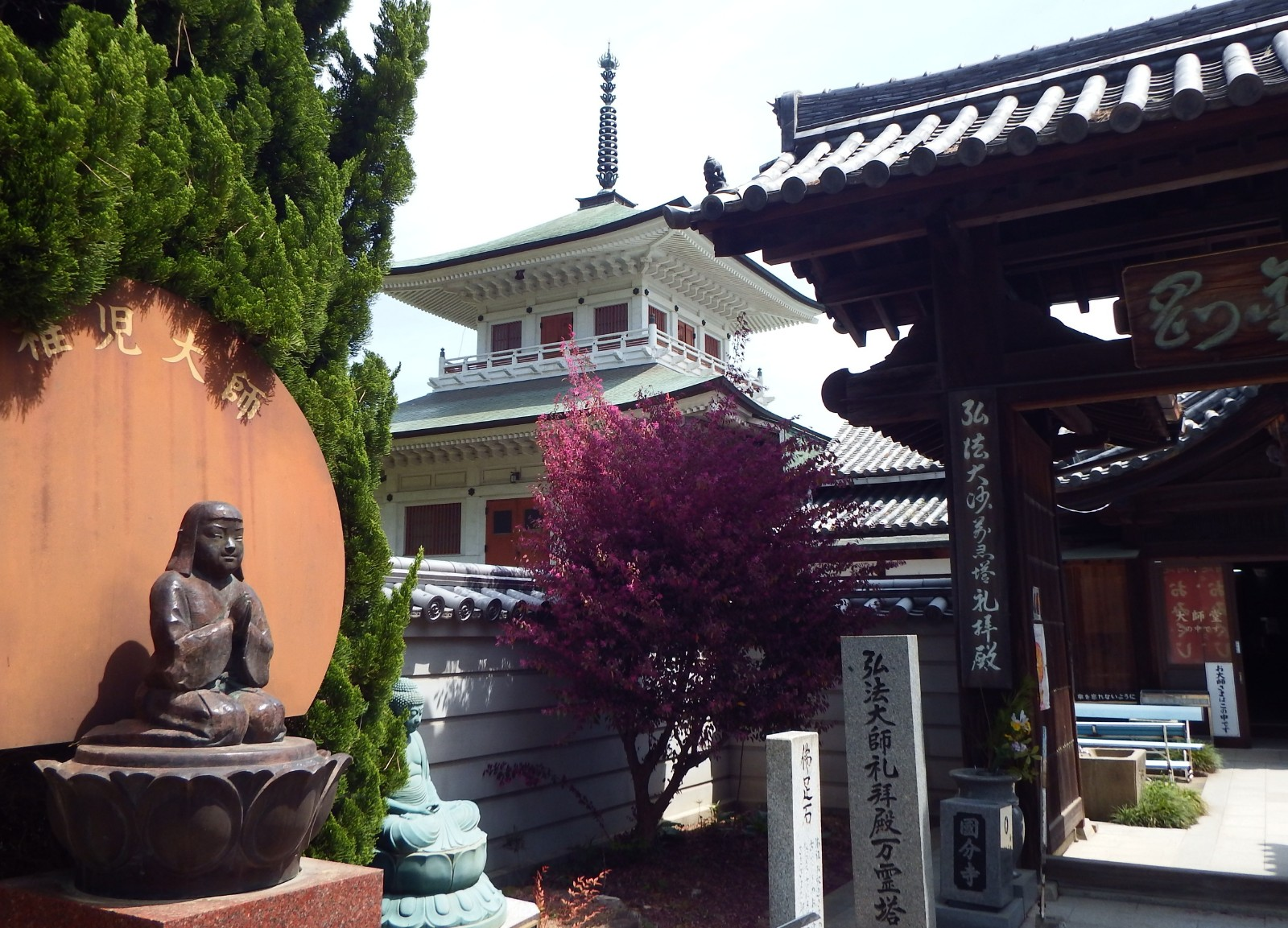
Daishi-dō

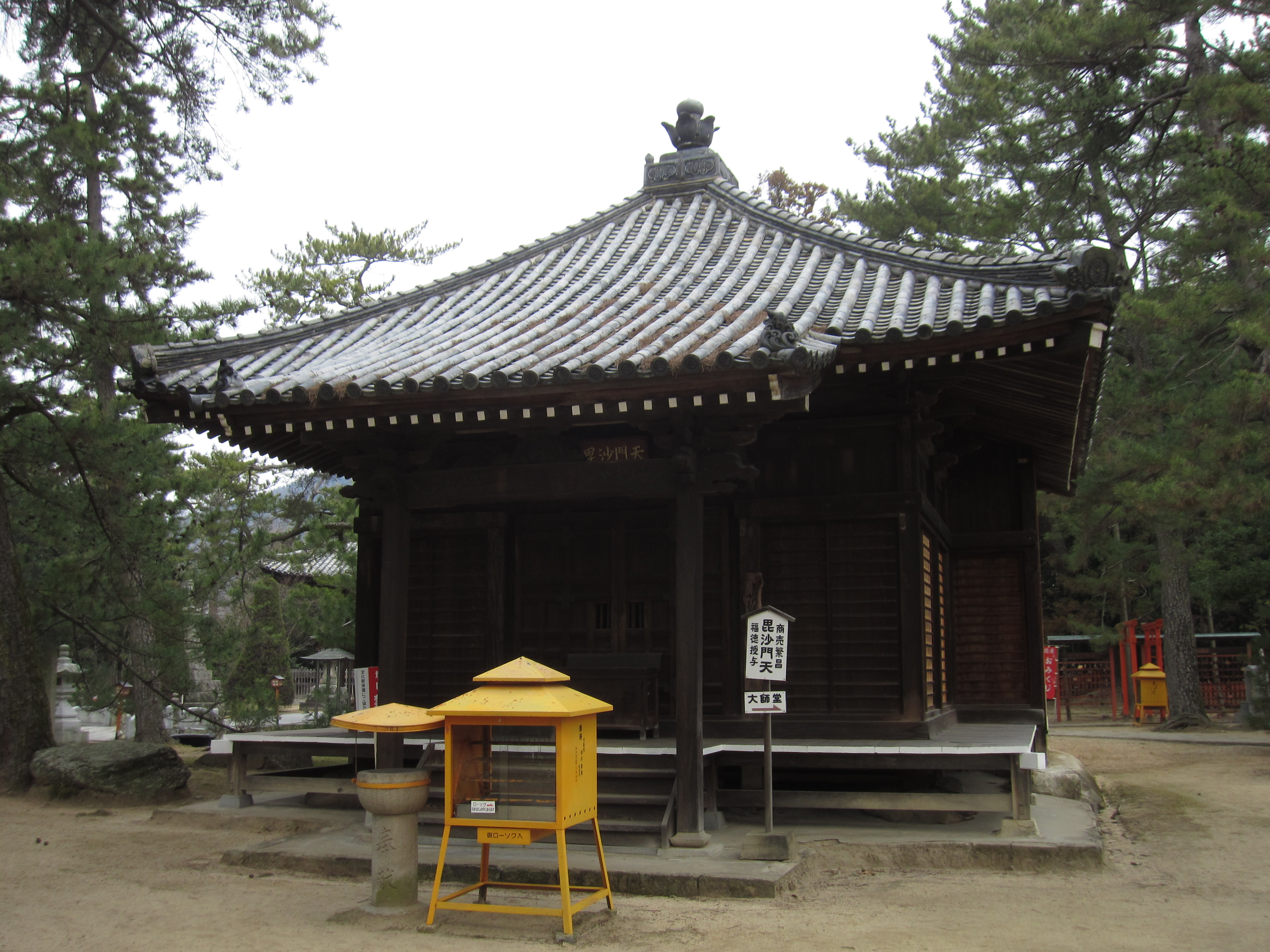
Dainichi Nyorai-dō

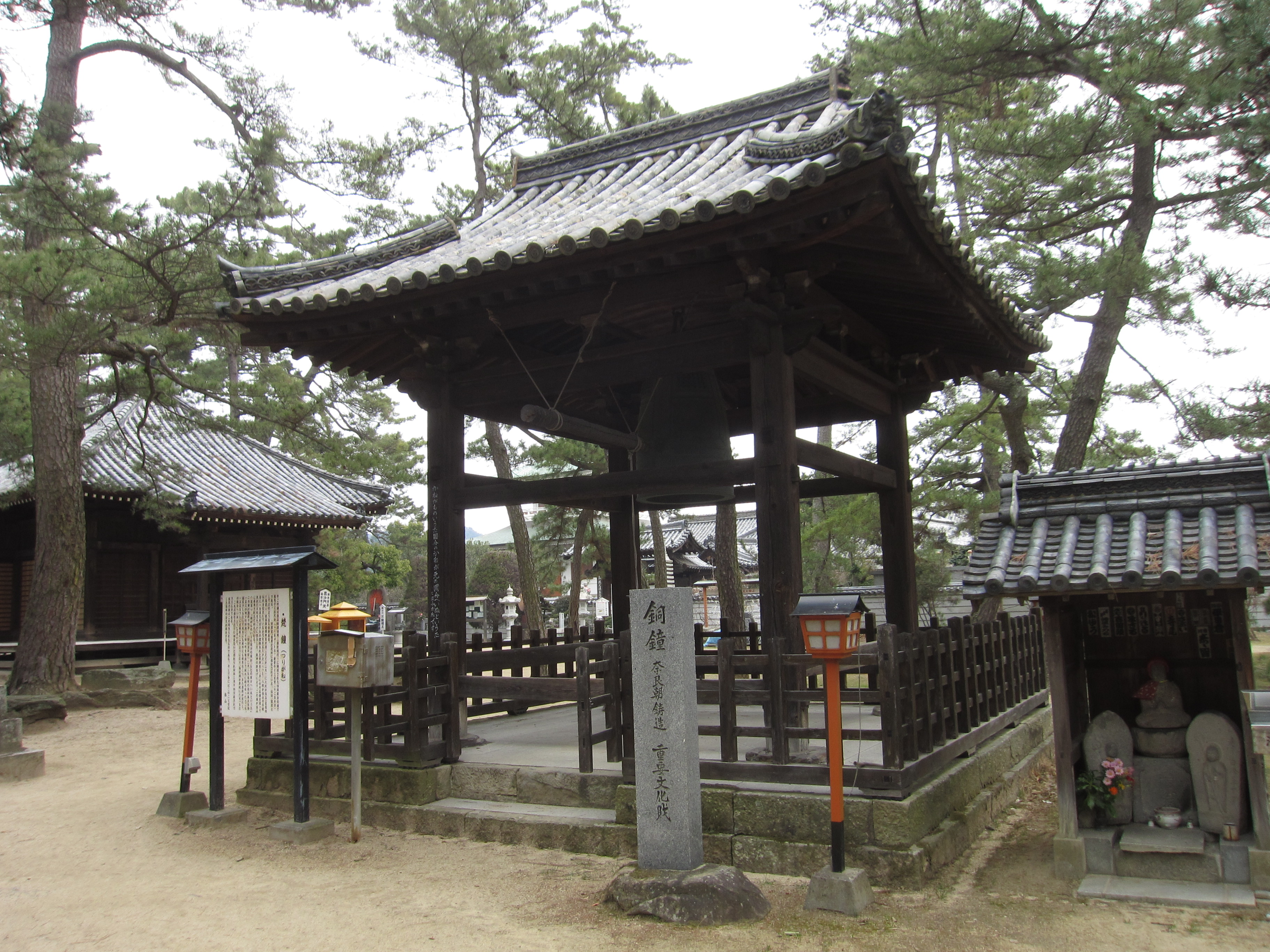
Shōrō

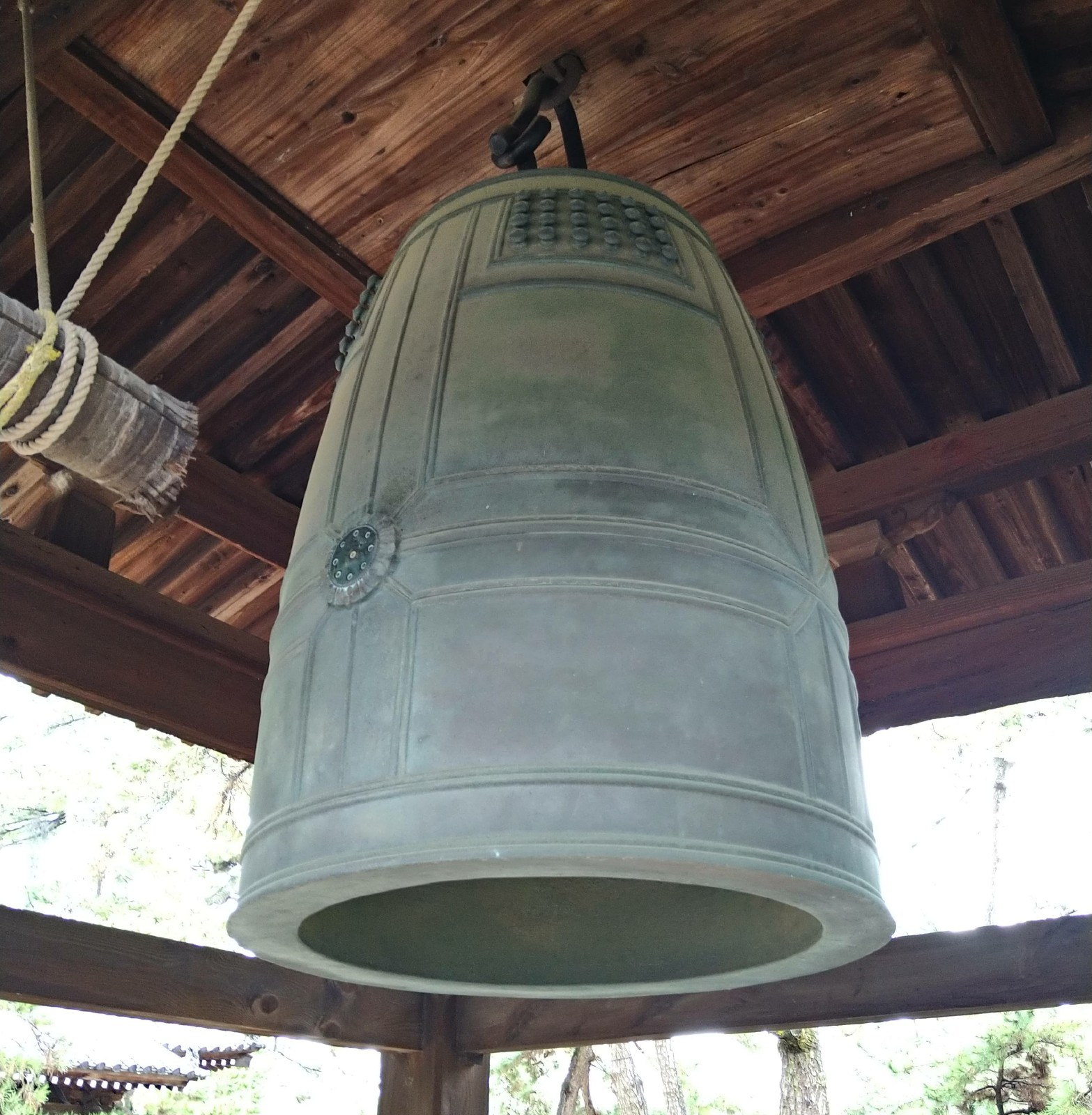
Bonshō (ICP)

== See also ==
- Provincial temple
- Shikoku 88 temple pilgrimage
- List of Special Places of Scenic Beauty, Special Historic Sites and Special Natural Monuments
- List of Historic Sites of Japan (Kagawa)
