= List of cultural properties of Japan – paintings (Kagawa) =

This list is of the cultural properties of Japan designated in the category of paintings (絵画, kaiga) for the Prefecture of Kagawa.

== National Cultural Properties ==
As of 1 July 2019, twenty-two Important Cultural Properties have been designated, being of national significance.

Property	Date	Municipality	Ownership	Comments	Image	Dimensions	Coordinates	Ref.
Kankyō Mandala, colour on silk 絹本著色観経曼荼羅図 kenpon chakushoku Kan-kyō mandara zu	Kamakura period	Kan'onji	Hagiwara-ji (萩原寺)				34°04′16″N 133°41′19″E	
Kannon Kudoku, colour on silk 絹本著色観世音功徳図 kenpon chakushoku Kanzeon kudoku zu	Edo period	Takamatsu	Hōnen-ji (法然寺)	forty panels: three pairs of six-panel byōbu and one of two-panel byōbu			34°16′25″N 134°02′47″E	
Illustrated Legends of Kotobiki-no-Miya, colour on silk 絹本著色琴弾宮絵縁起 kenpon chakushoku Kotobiki-no-miya e-engi	Kamakura period	Kan'onji	Kanon-ji (観音寺) (kept at The Kagawa Museum)				34°20′59″N 134°03′12″E	
Kotobiki Hachiman Buddhas, colour on silk 絹本著色琴弾八幡本地佛像 kenpon chakushoku Kotobiki Hachiman honchi hotoke zō	Kamakura period	Kan'onji	Kanon-ji (観音寺)				34°08′04″N 133°38′51″E	
Legends of Shido-ji, colour on silk 絹本著色志度寺縁起 kenpon chakushoku Shidoji engi	Kamakura/Nanboku-chō period	Sanuki	Shido-ji (志度寺)	six scrolls; with supplementary designation of nine volumes of documents			34°19′27″N 134°10′46″E	
Jūichimen Kannon, colour on silk 絹本著色十一面観音像 kenpon chakushoku Jūichimen Kannon zō	Kamakura period	Sanuki	Shido-ji (志度寺)				34°19′27″N 134°10′46″E	
Ten Kings of Hell, colour on silk, by Riku Shinchū 絹本著色十王像〈陸信忠筆／〉 kenpon chakushoku jūō-zō (Riku Shinchū hitsu)	Yuan dynasty	Takamatsu	Hōnen-ji (法然寺)	ten scrolls			34°16′25″N 134°02′47″E	
Star Mandala, colour on silk 絹本著色星曼荼羅図 kenpon chakushoku hoshi mandara zu	Nanboku-chō period	Tadotsu	Dōryū-ji (道隆寺)				34°16′36″N 133°45′46″E	
Jizō Mandala, colour on silk 絹本著色地蔵曼荼羅図 kenpon chakushoku Jizō mandara zu	Goryeo dynasty	Higashikagawa	Yoda-ji (与田寺)	Goryeo Buddhist painting		128 centimetres (50 in) by 76.5 centimetres (30.1 in)	34°14′30″N 134°19′18″E	
Chishō Daishi, colour on silk 絹本著色智証大師像〈／有賛〉 kenpon chakushoku Chishō Daishi zō	Kamakura period	Zentsuji	Konzō-ji (金倉寺)				34°15′00″N 133°46′51″E	
Fudō with Two Attendants, colour on silk 絹本著色不動二童子像 kenpon chakushoku Fudō ni-dōji zō	Kamakura period	Kan'onji	Kanon-ji (観音寺) (kept at The Kagawa Museum)				34°20′59″N 134°03′12″E	
Nirvana painting, colour on silk 絹本著色仏涅槃図 kenpon chakushoku Butsu nehan zu	Kamakura period	Higashikagawa	Yoda-ji (与田寺)				34°14′30″N 134°19′18″E	
Benzaiten with Fifteen Attendants, colour on silk 絹本著色弁財天十五童子像 kenpon chakushoku Benzaiten jūgo-dōji zō	Kamakura period	Kotohira	Kotohira-gū				34°11′02″N 133°48′34″E	
Lotus Sutra Mandala, colour on silk 絹本著色法華曼荼羅図 kenpon chakushoku hokke mandara zu	Kamakura period	Kan'onji	Hagiwara-ji (萩原寺)				34°04′16″N 133°41′19″E	
Mandala of the Two Realms, colour on silk 絹本著色両界曼荼羅図 kenpon chakushoku ryōkai mandara zu	Kamakura period	Sanuki	Gokuraku-ji (極楽寺)	pair of scrolls			34°15′38″N 134°11′00″E	
Scenes from the Tale of Genji, colour on paper with gold ground, by Kanō Osanobu 紙本金地著色源氏物語図（若葉 紅葉賀）〈狩野養信筆／八曲屏風〉 shihon kinji chakushoku Genji Monogatari zu (wakaba momijiga) (Kanō Osanobu hitsu; hakkyoku byōbu)	early C19	Takamatsu	Hōnen-ji (法然寺)	pair of eight-panel byōbu			34°16′25″N 134°02′47″E	
Nayotake Monogatari emaki, colour on paper 紙本著色なよ竹物語絵巻 shihon chakushoku Nayotake Monogatari emaki	Kamakura period	Kotohira	Kotohira-gū	one scroll			34°11′02″N 133°48′34″E	
Cycads, ink on paper, by Yosa Buson 紙本墨画蘇鉄図〈与謝蕪村筆／四曲屏風〉 shihon bokuga sotetsu zu (Yosa Buson hitsu; shikyoku byōbu)	C18	Marugame	Myōhōji (妙法寺)	pair of four-panel byōbu; with supplementary designation of four painted fusuma depicting Shide in the Mountains, four landscape byōbu, and hanging scrolls of Jurōjin and of bamboo			34°17′23″N 133°47′42″E	
Seven Sages of the Bamboo Grove, ink on paper, by Ōkyo 紙本墨画竹林七賢図〈応挙筆／七賢ノ間貼付〉 shihon bokuga chikurin shichiken zu (Ōkyo hitsu)	C18	Kotohira	Kotohira-gū	sixteen panels			34°11′02″N 133°48′34″E	
Tigers at Play, ink on paper, by Ōkyo 紙本墨画遊虎図〈応挙筆／虎ノ間貼付〉 shihon bokuga yūko zu (Ōkyo hitsu)	C18	Kotohira	Kotohira-gū	twenty-four panels			34°11′02″N 133°48′34″E	
Sporting Cranes, ink on paper, by Ōkyo 紙本墨画遊鶴図〈応挙筆／鶴ノ間貼付〉 shihon bokuga yūkaku zu (Ōkyo hitsu)	C18	Kotohira	Kotohira-gū	seventeen panels			34°11′02″N 133°48′34″E	
Landscape with Waterfall, ink on paper, by Ōkyo 紙本墨画瀑布及山水図〈応挙筆／上段及二ノ間貼付〉 shihon bokuga bakufu oyobi sansui zu (Ōkyo hitsu)	C18	Kotohira	Kotohira-gū	thirty-three panels			34°11′02″N 133°48′34″E	

== Prefectural Cultural Properties ==
As of 1 May 2019, twenty properties have been designated at a prefectural level.

Property	Date	Municipality	Ownership	Comments	Image	Dimensions	Coordinates	Ref.
Landscape with Ravines and Pines, from Yoda-ji 與田寺所蔵山水万壑松祷図; Yodaji shozō sansui bangaku shōtō zu		Higashikagawa	Yoda-ji (與田寺)				34°14′30″N 134°19′18″E	for all refs see
Sannōsai, byōbu from Yoda-ji 與田寺所蔵山王祭屏風; Yodaji shozō Sannōsai byōbu		Higashikagawa	Yoda-ji (與田寺)				34°14′30″N 134°19′18″E	
Nishitani Tōbee, colour on silk 絹本著色西谷藤兵衛肖像 kenpon chakushoku Nishitani Tōbee shōzō		Takamatsu	Tamon-in (多聞院) (kept at The Kagawa Museum)				34°20′59″N 134°03′12″E	
Womb Realm Mandala, colour on silk 絹本著色胎蔵界曼荼羅図 kenpon chakushoku taizōkai mandara zu		Higashikagawa	Shirotori Museum (白鳥美術館)				34°13′12″N 134°20′22″E	
Mandala of the Two Realms, colour on silk 絹本著色両界曼荼羅図 kenpon chakushoku ryōkai mandara zu		Kan'onji	Kannon-ji (観音寺)	pair of scrolls			34°08′04″N 133°38′51″E	
Mandala of the Two Realms, colour on silk 絹本著色両界曼荼羅図 kenpon chakushoku ryōkai mandara zu		Marugame	Jihō-ji (持宝寺) (kept at Marugame City Museum (丸亀市立資料館))	pair of scrolls			34°17′09″N 133°47′54″E	
Fudō Myōō with Two Attendants, ink on silk 絹本墨画不動明王立像 二童子像 kenpon bokuga Fudō Myōō ryūzō ni dōji zō		Utazu	Entsū-ji (円通寺)	three scrolls			34°18′19″N 133°49′38″E	
Chigo Daishi, colour on silk 絹本著色稚児大師像 kenpon chakushoku Chigo Daishi zō		Higashikagawa	Yoda-ji (與田寺)				34°14′30″N 134°19′18″E	
Shaka Triad, colour on silk 絹本著色釈迦三尊二声聞図 kenpon chakushoku Shaka sanzon ni shōmon zu	late Kamakura period	Utazu	Gōshō-ji (郷照寺)				34°18′24″N 133°49′28″E	
Konpira Festival, colour on paper, byōbu 紙本著色金毘羅祭礼図 六曲屏風 shihon chakushoku Konpira sairei zu rokkyoku byōbu		Kotohira	Kotohira-gū	pair of six-fold screens			34°11′02″N 133°48′34″E	
Hundred Flowers, colour on paper with gold dust ground, by Itō Jakuchū 紙本金砂子地著色百花の図 伊藤若沖筆 shihon kinsunago-chi chakushoku hyakka no zu Itō Jakuchū hitsu	C18	Kotohira	Kotohira-gū	eighteen panels			34°11′02″N 133°48′34″E	
Young Pines, colour on paper with gold ground, by Gantai 紙本金地著色若松の図 岸岱筆 shihon kinji chakushoku wakamatsu no zu Gantai hitsu	late Edo period	Kotohira	Kotohira-gū	eighteen panels			34°11′02″N 133°48′34″E	
Irises with Waterfowl, colour on paper with gold ground, by Gantai 紙本金地著色花菖蒲に水禽の図 岸岱筆 shihon kinji chakushoku hanashōbu ni suikin no zu Gantai hitsu	late Edo period	Kotohira	Kotohira-gū	sixteen panels			34°11′02″N 133°48′34″E	
Butterflies, colour on paper with gold ground, by Gantai 紙本金地著色群蝶の図 岸岱筆 shihon kinji chakushoku gunchō no zu Gantai hitsu	late Edo period	Kotohira	Kotohira-gū	four panels			34°11′02″N 133°48′34″E	
Willow with Egret, colour on paper with gold ground, by Gantai 紙本金地著色柳に白鷺の図 岸岱筆 shihon kinji chakushoku yanagi ni shirasagi no zu Gantai hitsu	late Edo period	Kotohira	Kotohira-gū	twenty-six panels			34°11′02″N 133°48′34″E	
Eight Phase Nirvana painting, colour on silk 絹本著色八相涅槃図 kenpon chakushoku hassō nehan zu		Mitoyo	Jōtoku-ji (常徳寺)				34°12′11″N 133°38′47″E	
Takamatsu Castle Town, colour on paper, eight-panel byōbu 紙本著色高松城下図 八曲屏風 shihon chakushoku Takamatsu-jōka hakkyoku byōbu	C17	Takamatsu	Kagawa Prefecture (kept at The Kagawa Museum)			489.0 centimetres (192.5 in) by 167.0 centimetres (65.7 in)	34°20′59″N 134°03′12″E	
Takamatsu Matsudaira Clan Album of Natural History 高松松平家博物図譜; Takamatsu Matsudaira-ke hakubutsu zufu		Takamatsu	private (kept at The Kagawa Museum)				34°20′59″N 134°03′12″E	
Nichiren Shōnin, colour on silk, by Kanō Tsunenobu 絹本著色日蓮聖人像 狩野常信筆 kenpon chakushoku Nichiren Shōnin zō Kanō Tsunenobu hitsu	early Edo period	Mitoyo	Honmon-ji (本門寺)			102.8 centimetres (40.5 in) by 58.0 centimetres (22.8 in)	34°12′17″N 133°42′28″E	
Nishitani Tōbee's Wife, colour on silk 絹本著色西谷藤兵衛夫人像 kenpon chakushoku Nishitani Tōbee fujin zō		Takamatsu	Tamon-in (多聞院) (kept at The Kagawa Museum)				34°20′59″N 134°03′12″E	

== See also ==
- Cultural Properties of Japan
- List of National Treasures of Japan (paintings)
- Japanese painting
- List of Cultural Properties of Japan - historical materials (Kagawa)
- List of Historic Sites of Japan (Kagawa)
- List of Museums in Kagawa Prefecture
