= List of cultural properties of Japan – archaeological materials (Kagawa) =

This list is of the cultural properties of Japan designated in the category of archaeological materials (考古資料, kōko shiryō) for the Prefecture of Kagawa.

== National Cultural Properties ==
As of 1 February 2015, one Important Cultural Property has been designated, being of national significance.

Property	Date	Municipality	Ownership	Comments	Image	Coordinates	Ref.
Split Bamboo-Shaped Sarcophagus 割竹形石棺 waritake gata sekkan	Kofun period	Zentsuji	Zentsuji Community Centre (善通寺市民会館)			34°13′38″N 133°47′01″E	

== Prefectural Cultural Properties ==
As of 1 May 2014, seven properties have been designated at a prefectural level.

Property	Date	Municipality	Ownership	Comments	Image	Coordinates	Ref.
Excavated Artefacts from Muromoto-chō, Kan'onji City 観音寺市室本町出土品; Kanonji-shi Muromoto-chō shutsudo hin		Kan'onji	Kan'onji City	6 items		34°07′51″N 133°38′37″E	
Narrow Bronze Swords 細形銅剣 hosogata dōken		Kan'onji	private (kept at the Kan'onji City Kyōdo Shiryōkan (観音寺市郷土資料館)	3 items		34°07′51″N 133°38′37″E)	
Old Tiles Excavated from Myōon-ji 妙音寺出土古瓦; Myōonji shutsudo kogawara		Mitoyo	Myōon-ji (妙音寺)	19 items		34°08′44″N 133°42′14″E	
Flat Bronze Swords Excavated from Hōjō, Takase-chō 平形銅剣 高瀬町北条出土 hiragata dōken Takase-chō Hōjō shutsudo		Takamatsu	Kagawa Prefecture (kept at The Kagawa Museum)	3 items		34°20′59″N 134°03′12″E	
Iron Pommel for a Tachi, with a Gold and Silver Inlaid Animal Design 鉄地金銀象嵌獣面紋大刀柄頭 tetsuji kingin zōgan jūmen mon tachi tsukagashira		Sakaide	Kamada Kyōsaiki Folk Museum (鎌田共済会郷土博物館)	1 item		34°18′48″N 133°51′07″E	
Iron Shakujō, Excavated freom the Former Gokurakuji Site, Sangawa-machi, Sanuki City 鉄錫杖 さぬき市寒川町旧極楽寺跡出土 tetsu shakujō Sanuki-shi Sangawa-chō kyū-Gokurakuji ato shutsudo		Sanuki	Gokuraku-ji (極楽寺)	1 item		34°15′38″N 134°11′00″E	
Yayoi Dogū 弥生土偶; Yayoi dogū		Takamatsu	Kagawa Prefecture	1 item		34°20′22″N 134°02′47″E	

== See also ==
- Cultural Properties of Japan
- List of National Treasures of Japan (archaeological materials)
- List of Historic Sites of Japan (Kagawa)
- List of Cultural Properties of Japan - historical materials (Kagawa)
- Sanuki Province
