= Kotohira Shrine (Chūō-ku, Niigata) =

Shinto shrine in Niigata, Japan

Kotohira Shrine 金刀比羅神社
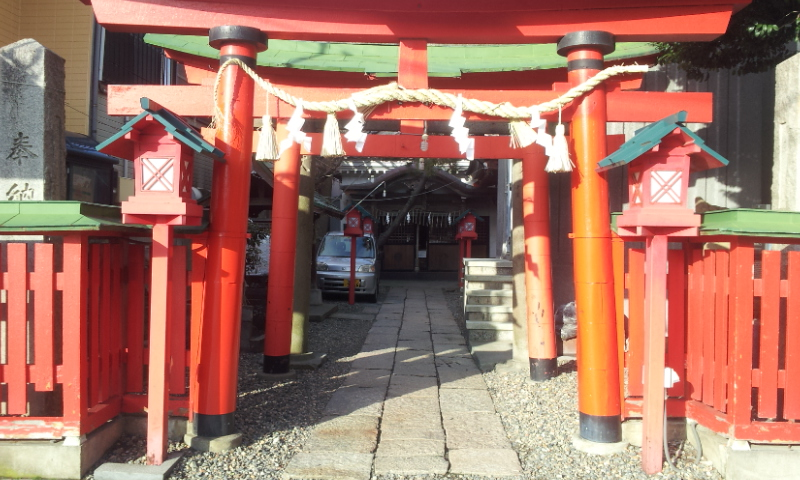

- Location within Japan

Religion
- Affiliation: Shinto
- Deity: Konpira Daigongen (Note: Also called Kotohira Ōkami (金刀比羅大神) among the members of the shrine's community and it is accepted as the equivalent of Ōmononushi.)

Location
- Location: 4579 Yoriaicho, Chūō-ku, Niigata
- Coordinates: 37°55′54.90″N 139°03′05.10″E

The Kotohira Shrine (金刀比羅神社, Kotohira Jinja) is a Shinto shrine located in Chūō-ku, Niigata, Niigata Prefecture, Japan. It is the only shrine in Japan that maintains Konpira Daigongen as the main kami. The kami that is worshipped within this shrine has a special description, Japan's only kami of salvation (日本唯一救いの神, Nihon yuiitsu sukui no kami). (Note: It is known to help people in inconvenient circumstances among locals and visitors today.) Due to the shrine being affiliated to the Association of Shinto Shrines, it does not promote any Shinbutsu-shūgō-based practices.

== History ==
Kotohira Shrine was founded during or after the Bunsei Era (1818 — 1830) and before the Meiji Restoration, a period in Japanese history that opened the opportunity of preserving the pre-Shinbutsu bunri name of Konpira Daigongen, in which it was not fully replaced by Ōmononushi, its traditional Shinto equivalent.

The founder was a Niigata-based maritime merchant, Suzuki Yagozaemon (鈴木弥五左ェ門), who regularly visited Kotohira-gū (Note: Kotohira-gū is traditionally a pilgrimage site for people whose livelihoods involve the sea.) in Sanuki Province (today's Kagawa Prefecture) for prayers that promote safety at the sea and eventually repurposed his residence as a shrine after hearing that his son was miraculously saved by Konpira Daiongen during the process of the sinking of his ship.

== Togakushi Shrine ==
A very small auxiliary shrine within the perimeter of Kotohira Shrine exists and it is called Togakushi Shrine (戸隠神社, Togakushi Jinja) (Note: Although being an auxiliary shrine of a diminutive size, it does not use the common suffix, sha (社).) houses Ame-no-Tajikarao from Togakushi Shrine since 1934. Behind the Togakushi Shrine, a stone statue of Avalokiteśvara (the Buddhist equivalent of Ame-no-Tajikarao) is present for the purpose of uramairi (裏参り) (Note: It is the act of performing additional prayers quietly at the behind of a main shrine building.) by visitors.

== Cultural heritage ==
The Kotohira Shrine houses a nationally important piece of work, the Engraved Ema of the Distressed Ship in Kotohira Shrine (金刀比羅神社難船彫刻絵馬, Kotohira Jinja Nansen Chōkoku Ema) that describes the story of the foundation of the shrine on an engraved block of wood.

== Branch shrines ==
The head priest, the descendant of Suzuki Yagozaemon, also manages branch shrines within the urban boundaries of Niigata.

- Gohei Inari Shrine (御幣稲荷神社, Gohei Inari Jinja), commonly called Aoyama Inari (青山稲荷): 1-chōme-18-1 Aoyama, Nishi-ku, Niigata City (Note: It is an Inari shrine. This branch shrine has a legend relating to a fox.)
- Suwa Shrine (諏訪社:, Suwa-sha): 1-chōme-7-12 Ubagayama, Chūō-ku, Niigata City
- Shinmei Shrine (神明社, Shinmei-sha): 3-7 Aoyamashimmachi, Nishi-ku, Niigata City
- Shinmei Shrine (神明社, Shinmei-sha): 832 Heijima, Nishi-ku, Niigata City
