= Konpira Gongen =

Japanese god of the Shugendō sect

- God of seafaring and sailors
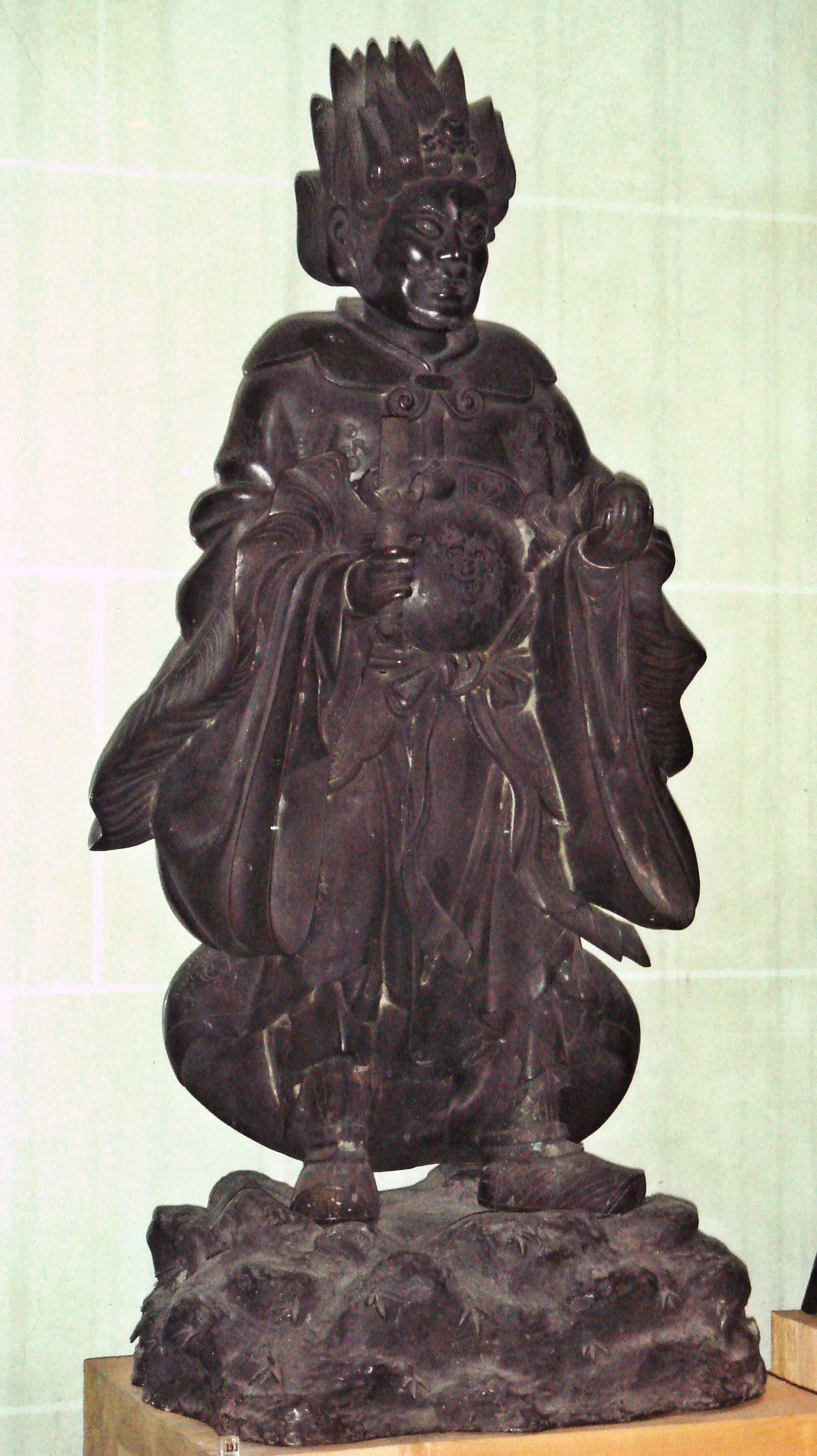
- Statue of Konpira Gongen, Musée Guimet
- Other names: Konpira Daigongen (金毘羅大権現, 金比羅大権現)
- Japanese: 金毘羅権現
- Affiliation: Acala (honji); Ōmononushi (conflated with); Emperor Sutoku
- Major cult center: Kotohira-gū (Kotohira, Kagawa Prefecture, Japan)
- Mantra: On Kubiraya sowaka

Equivalents
- Buddhist: Bhaisajyaguru

Konpira Gongen (金毘羅権現) is a Japanese god of the Shugendō sect originating in the mountain Kotohira of Kagawa Prefecture. He is the god of merchant sailors. He is worshipped at Kotohira Shrines

According to legend Konpira Gongen came into existence when a priest at Matsuo Temple summoned the Ganges deity Kumbhīra.

Kumbhīra was said to have been present at the preaching of the Mahāsamaya Sutta. He is a Ganges crocodile god.

He is identified with the first of the twelve spirit messengers emanating from Bhaisajyaguru.

Alongside many other water deities like Watatsumi, Sumiyoshi, Munakata-sanjojin, Ebisu, and Gozu Tennō his cult became very significant in medieval times.

== Overview ==
Yoshida Kanetomo said that Susanoo, the Shinto god of sea and storms, is the same as the Indian god Khumbīra. This god watches over Vulture Peak, a place in Buddhist mythology...

As time passed, people in Japan began to see Konpira as a guardian of their Buddhist religion. They placed Konpira in a shrine on Zōzusan mountain in Shikoku. This mountain was very important for Shugendō followers by the end of the Heian period. Shugendō is a Japanese belief that combines mountain living, Shinto, and Buddhism. On this mountain, Konpira was given a new name, Konpira Gongen...

=== Associations ===
Konpira is connected to gods of water, like dragons and nāga kings. These connections make him a protector of people at sea and the paths they take over the water. This is especially true for the waters inside Japan's coast. In a special part of Buddhism, people honor Konpira as one of twelve powerful spirit leaders. These leaders are linked to twelve directions and twelve animals from the Chinese calendar. Different stories match Konpira to different directions. But most often, he is linked to the north...

Sometimes Konpira is identified with gods like Ōkuninushi or Shinra Myōjin. ... But the most recent identification is with Ōmononushi. His identification with Ōmononushi may seem strange at first since Ōmononushi is a deity of mountains and snakes, while he is a water and navigatonal deity, but the logic behind it is that mountains are often used for navigation in the sea, so mountain deities help sailors.

=== In Literature ===
A Buddhist text "Sange yōryakki" talks about Buddha placing twelve gods on Eagle Peak. One of these gods is Konpira. Here, Konpira is seen as a very important god in Japan. He is thought to be the divine child of Susanoo no Mikoto. People believed that a monk named Saichō came back safely from China because he prayed to Susanoo...

In later books, like "Jindai no maki kaden kikigaki" by Koretari, there are more stories. They say Susanoo visited not just Japan but also China and India. These stories suggest that the Japanese gods could be versions of Indian gods. This idea turns the usual story around, with Japanese gods being seen in other countries' stories...

== Kotohira Shrines ==
Kotohira Shrines are a kind of Shinto shrine in Japan. They were originally dedicated to the syncretic deity Konpira Gongen, but in the Meiji restoration due to Shinbutsu bunri they were dedicated to Ōmononushi. Their head shrine is Kotohira-gū. They are dedicated to seafaring and protecting sailors.

They are part of the famous Inahachikonten Shrines (稲八金天神社) of the Shrine Consolidation Policy alongside Inari Shrine, Hachiman Shrine, Kotohira Shrines, and Tenmangu Shrine.

=== History ===
According to legend Konpira Gongen came into existence when a priest at Matsuo Temple summoned the Ganges deity Kumbhīra. Starting as a hostile sea monster, the deity was placated and became a god of navigation. The deity is perceived as perhaps being a deification of a sea serpent called a wani.

Kotohira-gū is located close to and strongly historically associated with Matsuo Temple. In 1889 due to the Meiji Restoration the head temple was renamed from Konpira temple to Kotohira-gu.

=== List of Kotohira Shrines ===
- Kotohira-gū
- Miyabiro Shrine
- Ōtsuna Kotohira Shrine
- Kotohira Shrine (Kuji City)
- Kotohira & Ōwashi Shrine
- Kotohira-gū (Tokyo Port Area)
- Kotohira-gū Tokyo Branch
- Kotohira-gū Matsuyama Branch
- Kotohira Shrine (Joetsu City)
- Kotohira Shrine (Kohei Town)
- Kotohira Shrine (Kochi City)
- Kotohira Shrine (Kawasaki City)
- Kotohira Shrine (Tatebayashi City)
- Kotohira Shrine (Kyotango City)
- Kotohira Shrine (Taito Ward)
- Kotohira Shrine (Tokushima City Kawauchi Town)
- Kotohira Shrine (Shin Kami Goto Town Mikka No Ura Village)
- Kotohira Shrine (Nemuro City)
- Kotohira Shrine (Naruto City)
- Kotohira Shrine (Tokushima City)
- Kotohira Shrine (Nagareyama City)
- Konpira-gū (Tama City)
- Konpira Daigongen (Kurashiki City)
- Bessho Kotohira Shrine
- Miyoshi Shrine (Sapporo City)
- Yasui Konpira-gū
- Matsuo Temple (Kagawa Prefecture Kotohira Town)
- Ryūtōzan Shrine
- Sapporo Hachimangū
- Kotohira Shrine (Chūō-ku, Niigata)

== See also ==
- Shinbutsu-shūgō
- Honji suijaku
- Kotohira-gū
- Emperor Sutoku
