= Sapporo Hachimangū =

Shinto shrine in Sapporo, Hokkaido, Japan

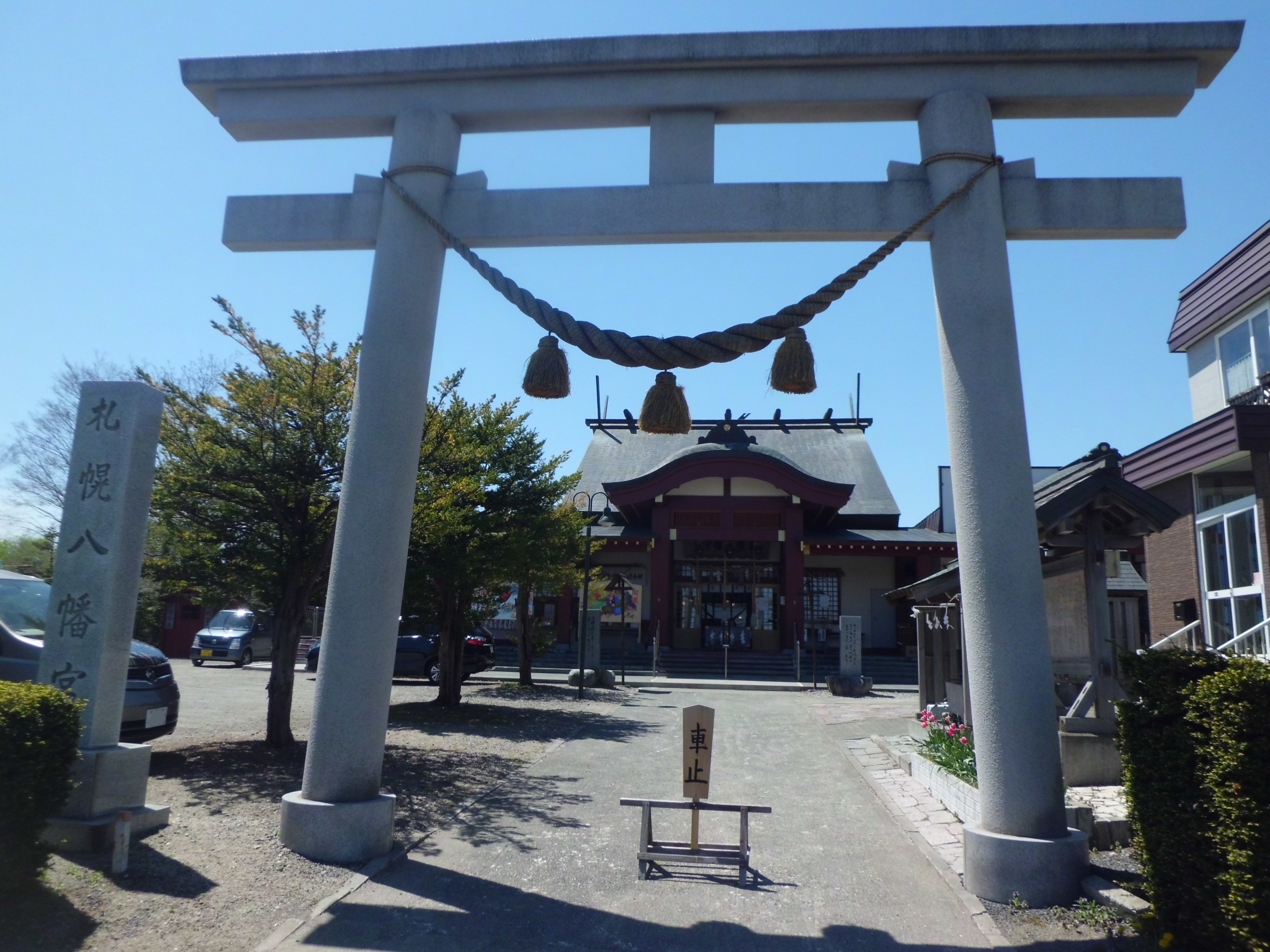

Religion
- Affiliation: Shinto
- Deity: Tenjin (天満大神), Sugawara no Michizane), Akibadai Gongen (秋葉大権現), Ume no Miya Okami (梅の宮大神), Kotohira no Okami (金刀比羅大神)
- Interactive map of Sapporo Hachimangū

Sapporo Hachimangū (札幌八幡宮, Sapporo Hachimangū) is a Shinto shrine located in Sapporo, Hokkaido. It is a Hachiman shrine, dedicated to the kami Hachiman. It was established in 1977. Kami enshrined here include Tenjin (天満大神), Sugawara no Michizane), Akibadai Gongen (秋葉大権現), Ume no Miya Okami (梅の宮大神), and Kotohira no Okami (金刀比羅大神).

== See also ==
- Hachiman shrine
- List of Shinto shrines in Hokkaidō
