= List of cultural properties of Japan – historical materials (Kagawa) =

This list is of the cultural properties of Japan designated in the category of historical materials (歴史資料, rekishi shiryō) for the Prefecture of Kagawa.

== National Cultural Properties ==
As of 1 February 2015, one Important Cultural Property has been designated, being of national significance.

Property	Date	Municipality	Ownership	Comments	Image	Coordinates	Ref.
Materials relating to Kume Tsūken 久米通賢関係資料; Kume Tsūken kankei shiryō	late Edo period	Sakaide	Kamada Kyōsaiki Folk Museum (鎌田共済会郷土博物館)	1,061 items		34°18′48″N 133°51′07″E	

== Prefectural Cultural Properties ==
As of 1 May 2014, one property has been designated at a prefectural level.

Property	Date	Municipality	Ownership	Comments	Image	Coordinates	Ref.
Motoyama-ji Sutra Woodblocks 本山寺蔵経文板木; Motoyamaji zō kyōmon hangi		Mitoyo	Motoyama-ji	87 items		34°08′23″N 133°41′39″E	

== See also ==
- Cultural Properties of Japan
- List of National Treasures of Japan (historical materials)
- List of Historic Sites of Japan (Kagawa)
- Sanuki Province
