= Shido-ji =

Buddhist temple in Japan

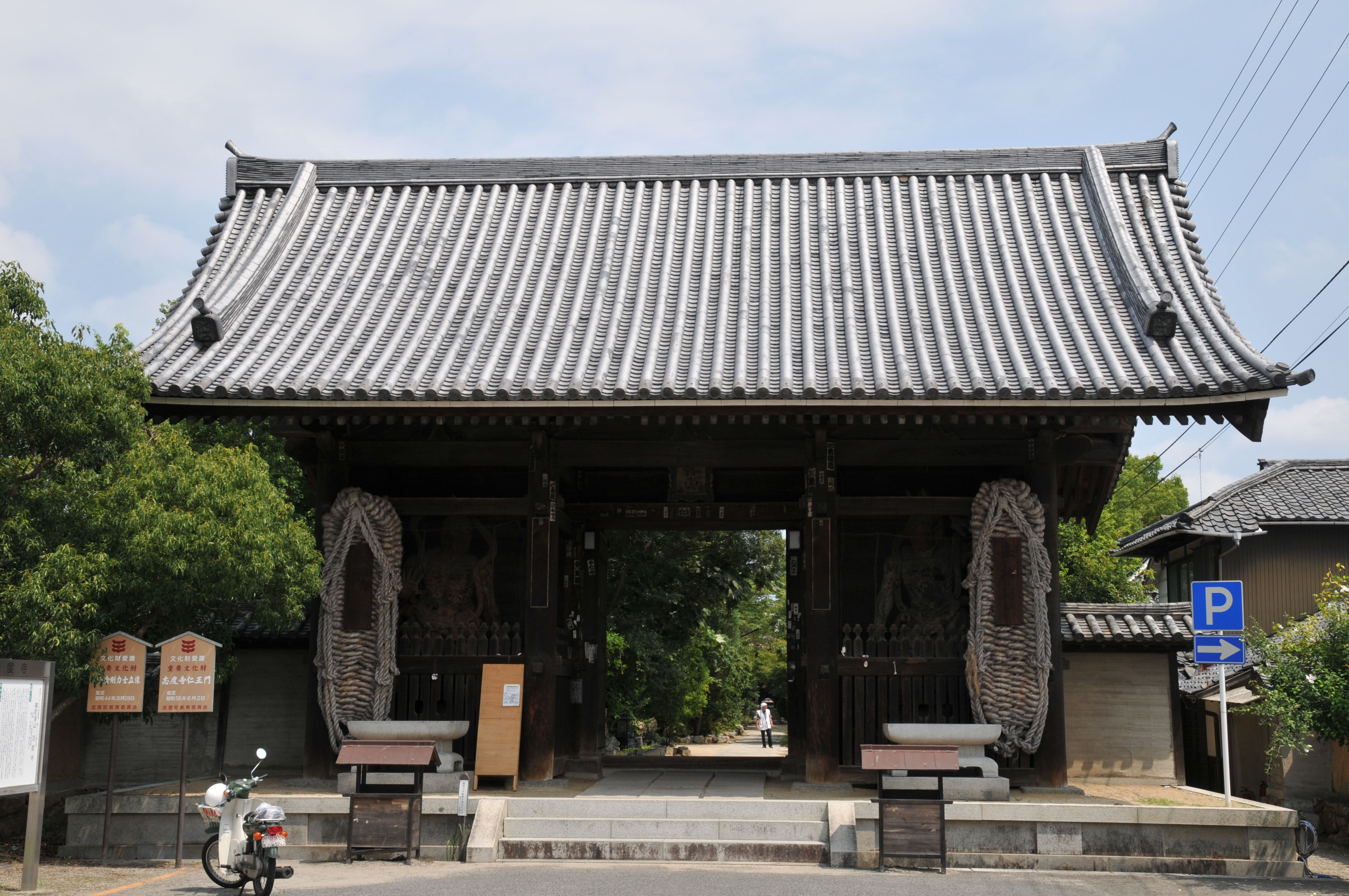

Religion
- Deity: Ekādaśamukha

Location
- Location: Sanuki, Kagawa
- Country: Japan
- Interactive map of Shido-ji
- Coordinates: 34.3243°N 134.1796°E

Architecture
- Founder: Chikako
- Completed: 625

Shido-ji (志度寺) is a Buddhist temple in Sanuki, Kagawa, Japan. It is the 86th site of the Shikoku Pilgrimage.

== History ==
The temple was founded in 625, when Chikako, a member of a marine group, sculpted a statue of Ekādaśamukha on a sacred tree and built a temple.

== Tomb of Ama ==
The Tomb of Ama is a tomb related to a tragic story about the Fujiwara no Fusasaki family.
