= Motoyama-ji =

Buddhist temple in Kagawa Prefecture, Japan

Shippōzan Motoyama-ji
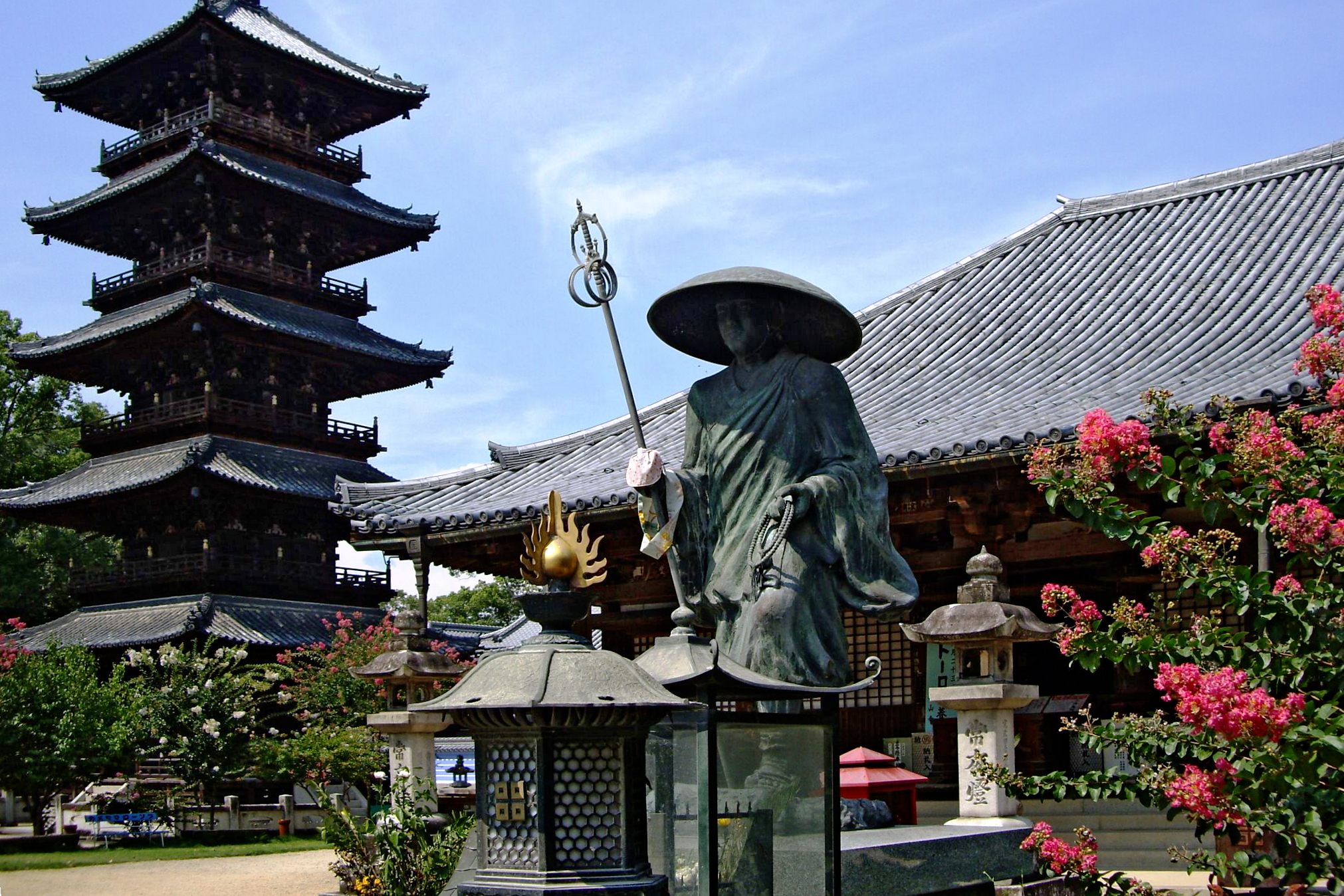
- Bronze statue of Kūkai in front of Mail Hall

- , Motoyama-ji (Japan)

Religion
- Affiliation: Buddhism
- Rite: Kōyasan Shingon

Location
- Location: Mitoyo, Kagawa Prefecture
- Country: Japan
- Coordinates: 34°8′22.8″N 133°41′38.6″E

Architecture
- Founder: Kūkai
- Established: 807
- Completed: 1913 (Reconstruction)

The Shippōzan Motoyama-ji (Japanese: 七宝山 本山寺) is a Shingon Buddhist temple of the Kōyasan sect in Mitoyo, Kagawa Prefecture, Japan. It was established by Emperor Heizei's order in 807. Hayagriva is the principal image. The temple has undergone several reconstruction efforts since its founding, including the rebuilding of its Main Hall (which is a National Treasure of Japan) in 1300.

Motoyama-ji is temple No.70 in the Shikoku Pilgrimage.

== Building list ==
- Main Hall – National Treasure of Japan. It was rebuilt in 1300.
- Sanmon (Niō Gate) – Important Cultural Property. Zen'yō. It was rebuilt in 1147.
- Pagoda – It was rebuilt in 1913.
- Daishidō
- Gomadō
- Chinjudō – Cultural Property of Kagawa prefecture. It was rebuilt in 1547 (Muromachi period).
- Amidadō
- Jūōdō
- Dainichidō
- Ireidō
- Kyakuden
- Bell tower
- Kuri

== See also ==
- National Treasures of Japan
  - List of National Treasures of Japan (temples)

== Gallery ==
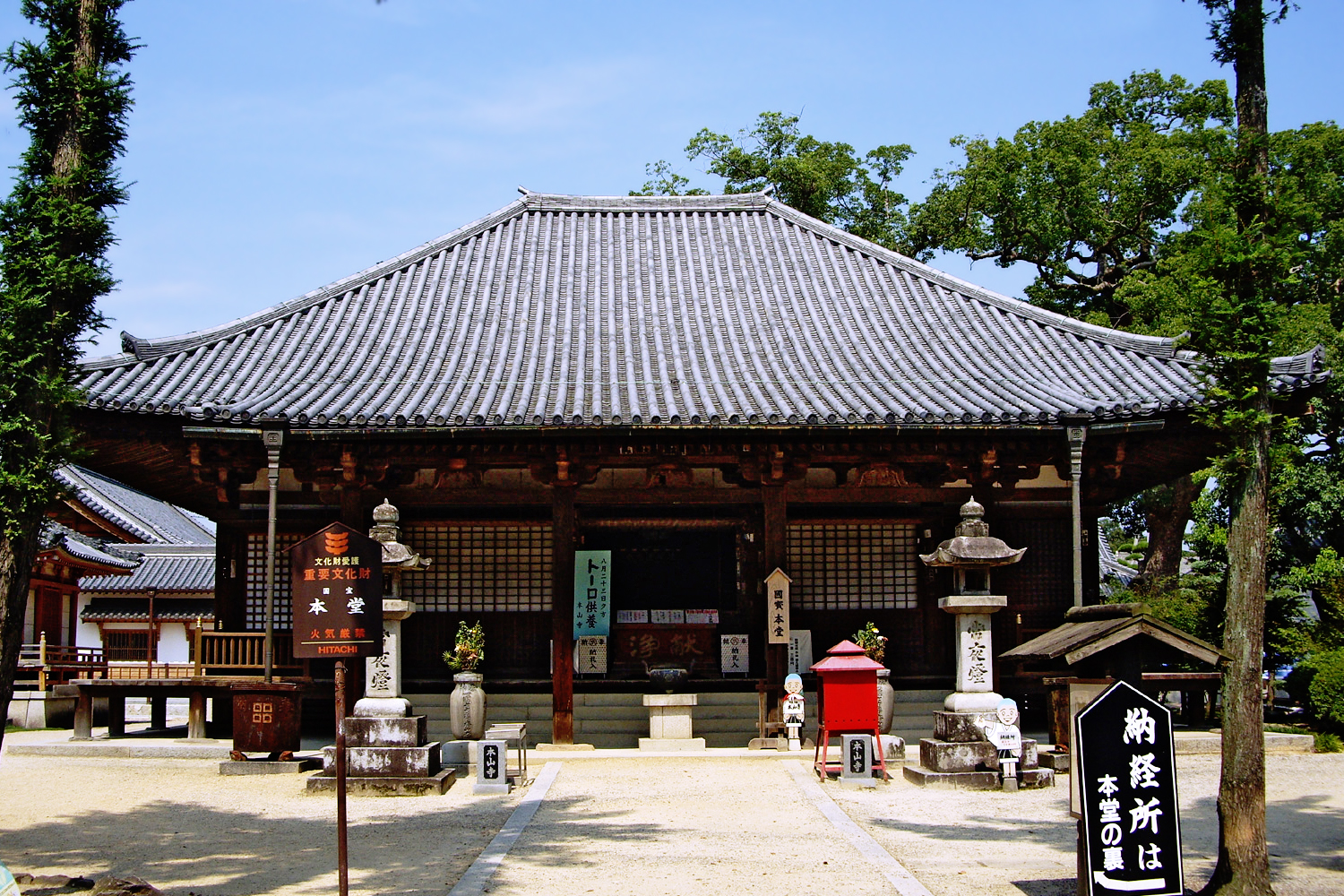
Main Hall

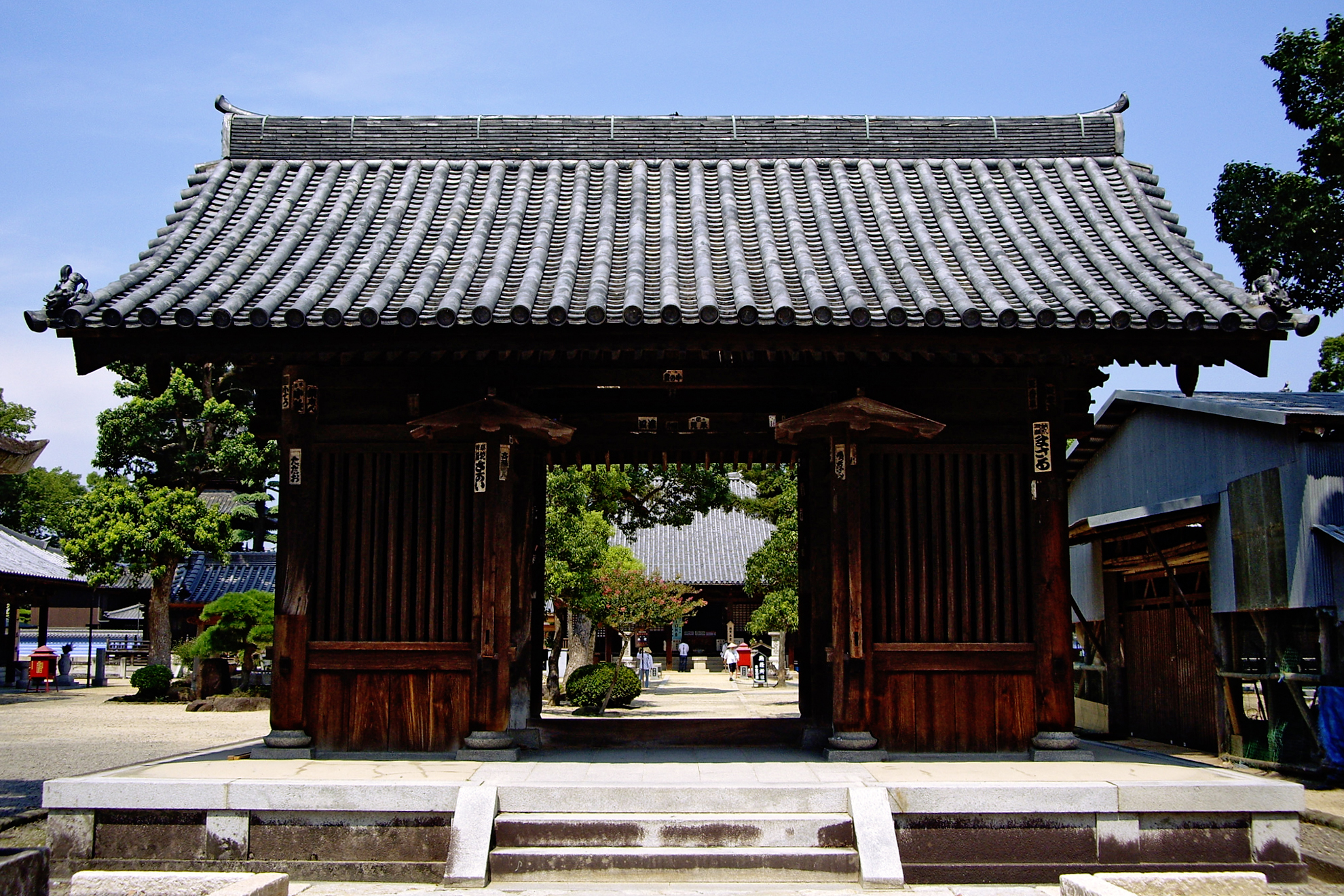
Sanmon (Nio Gate)

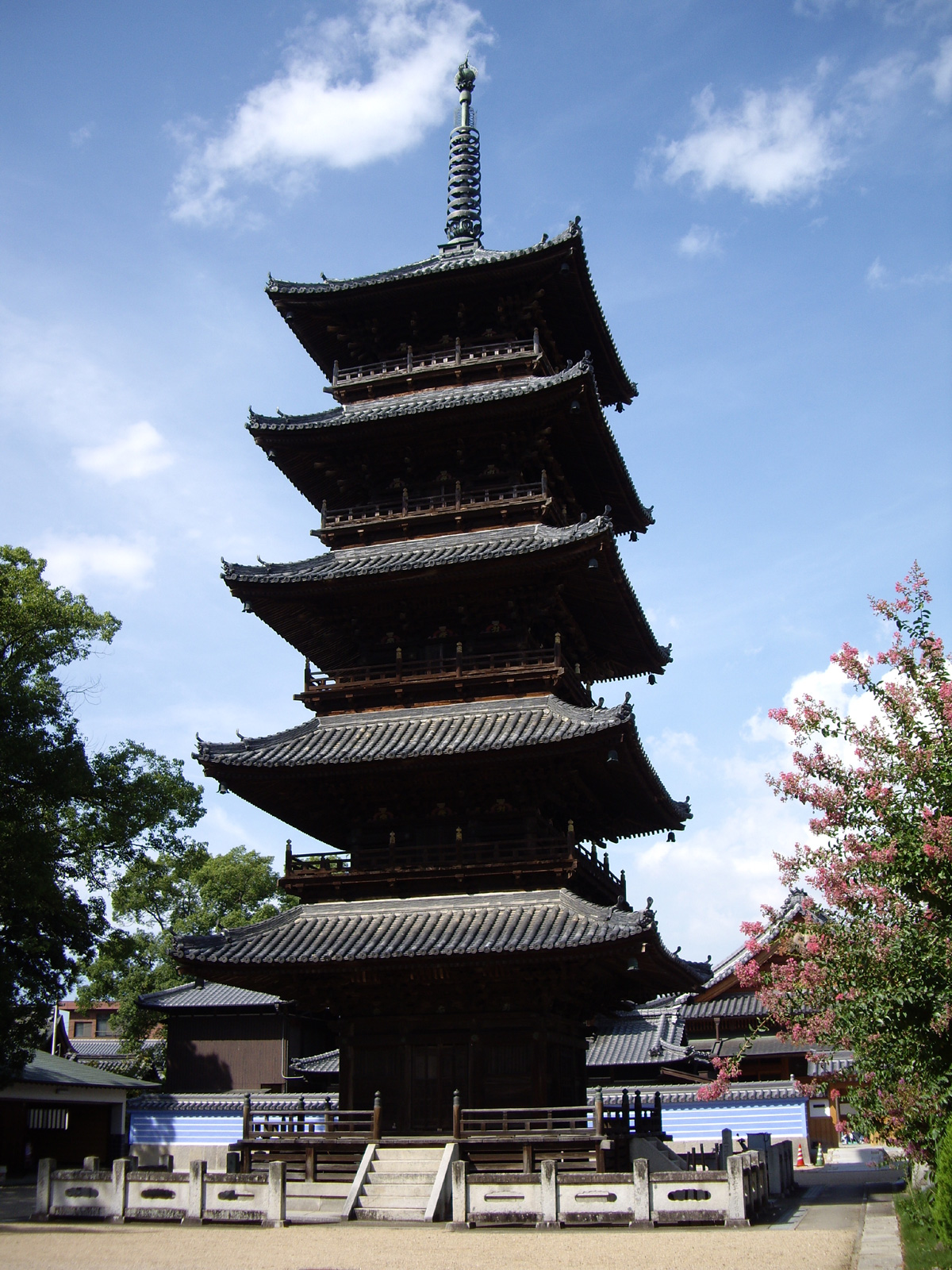
Pagoda

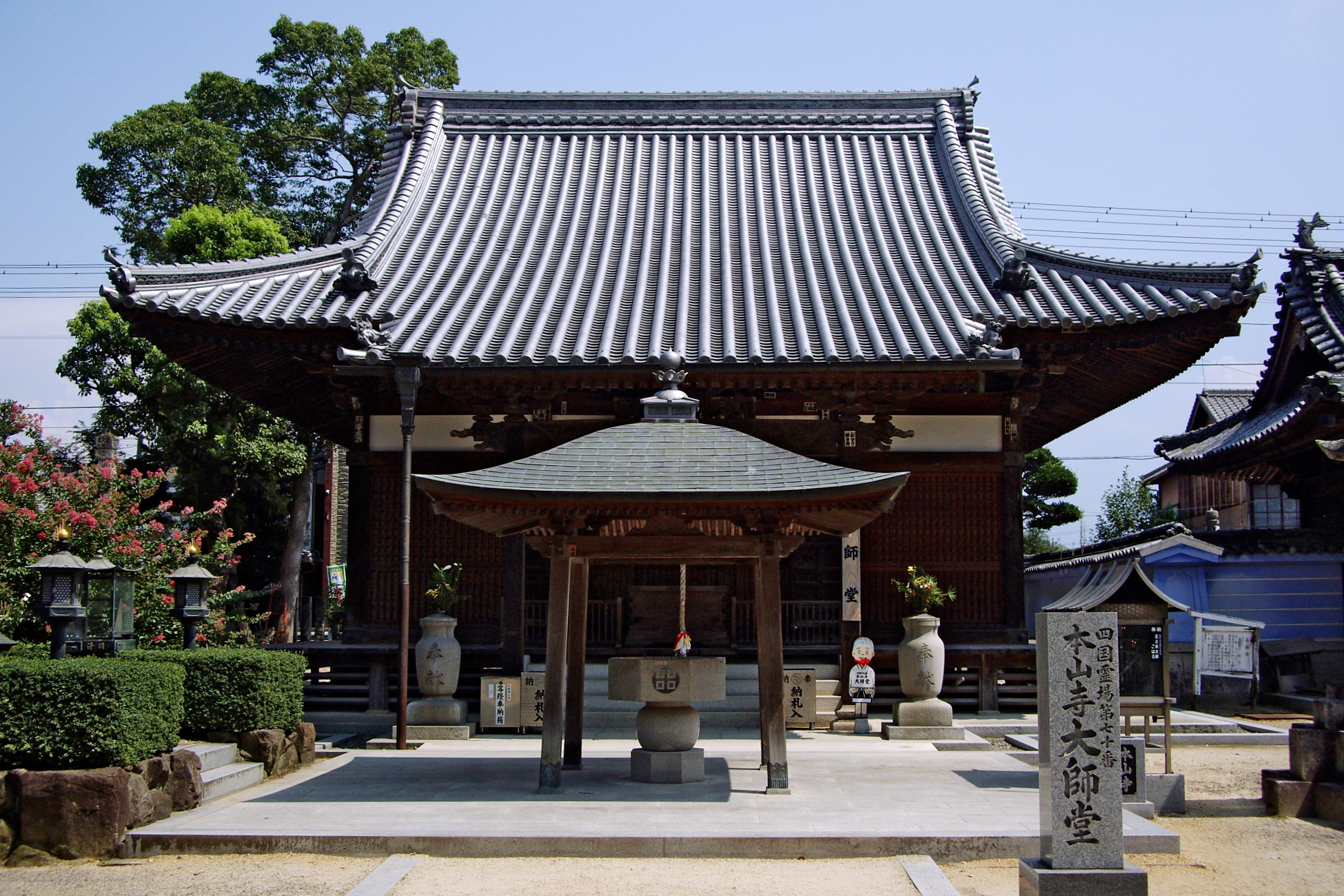
Daishidō

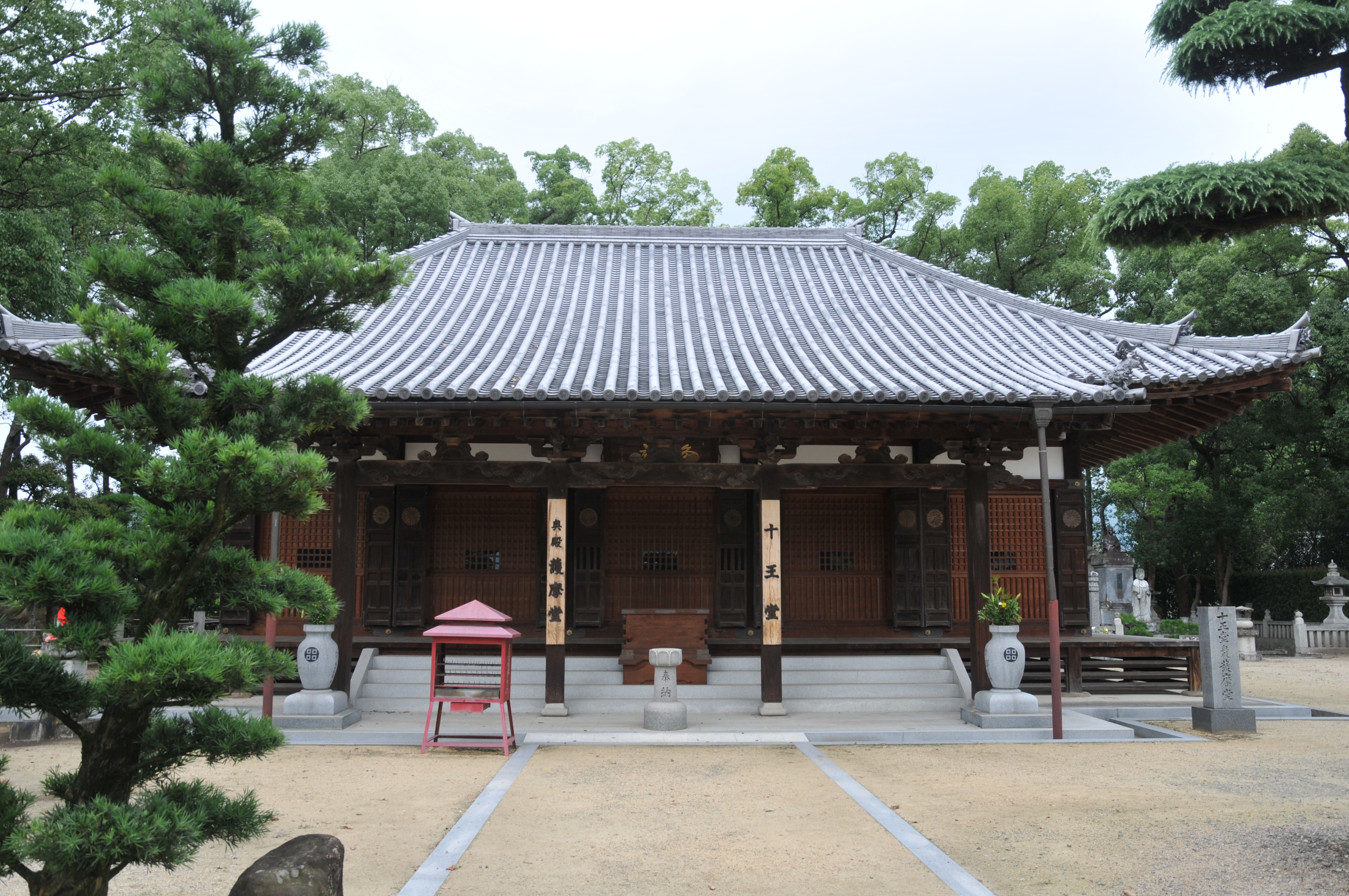
Jūōdō

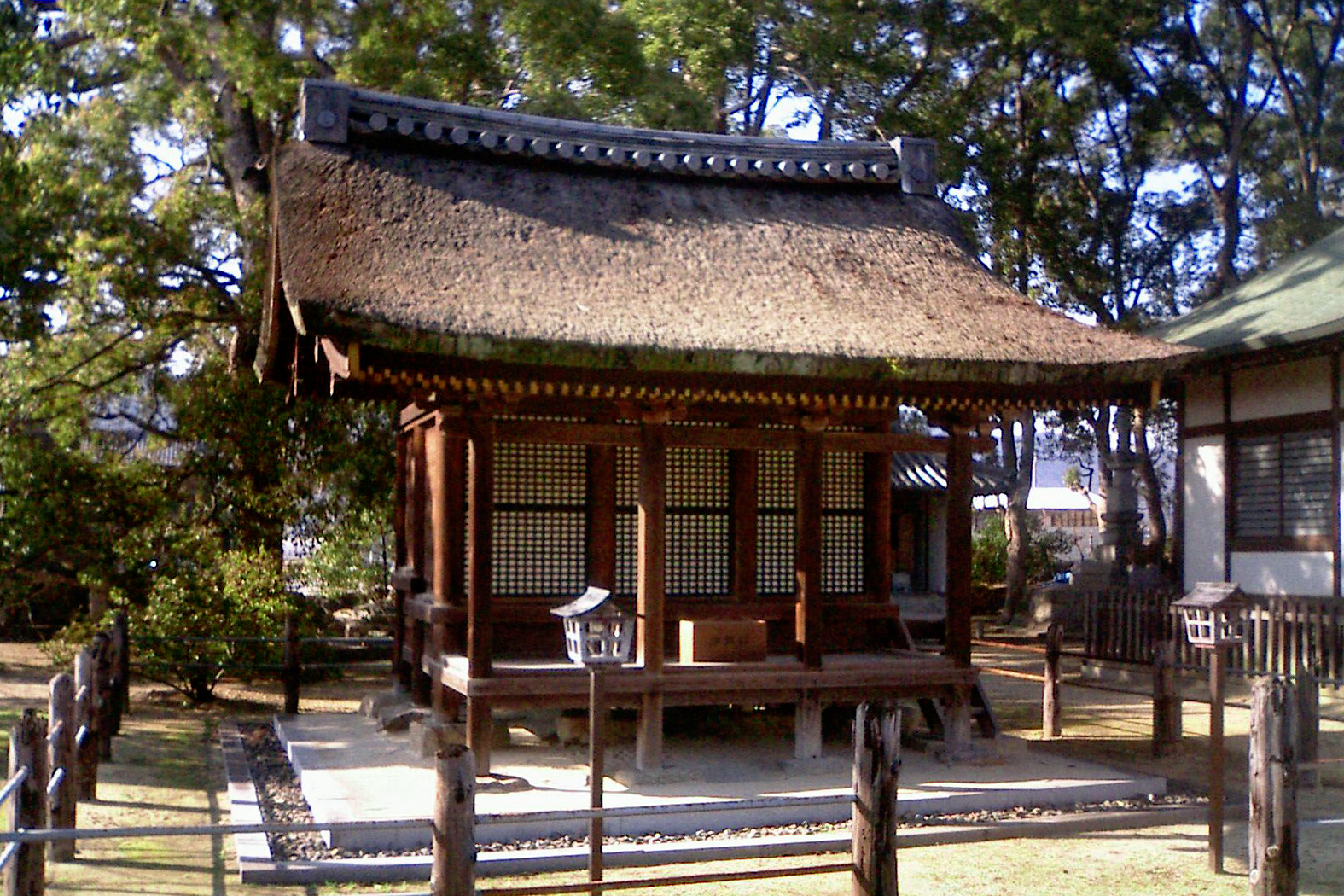
Chinjudō

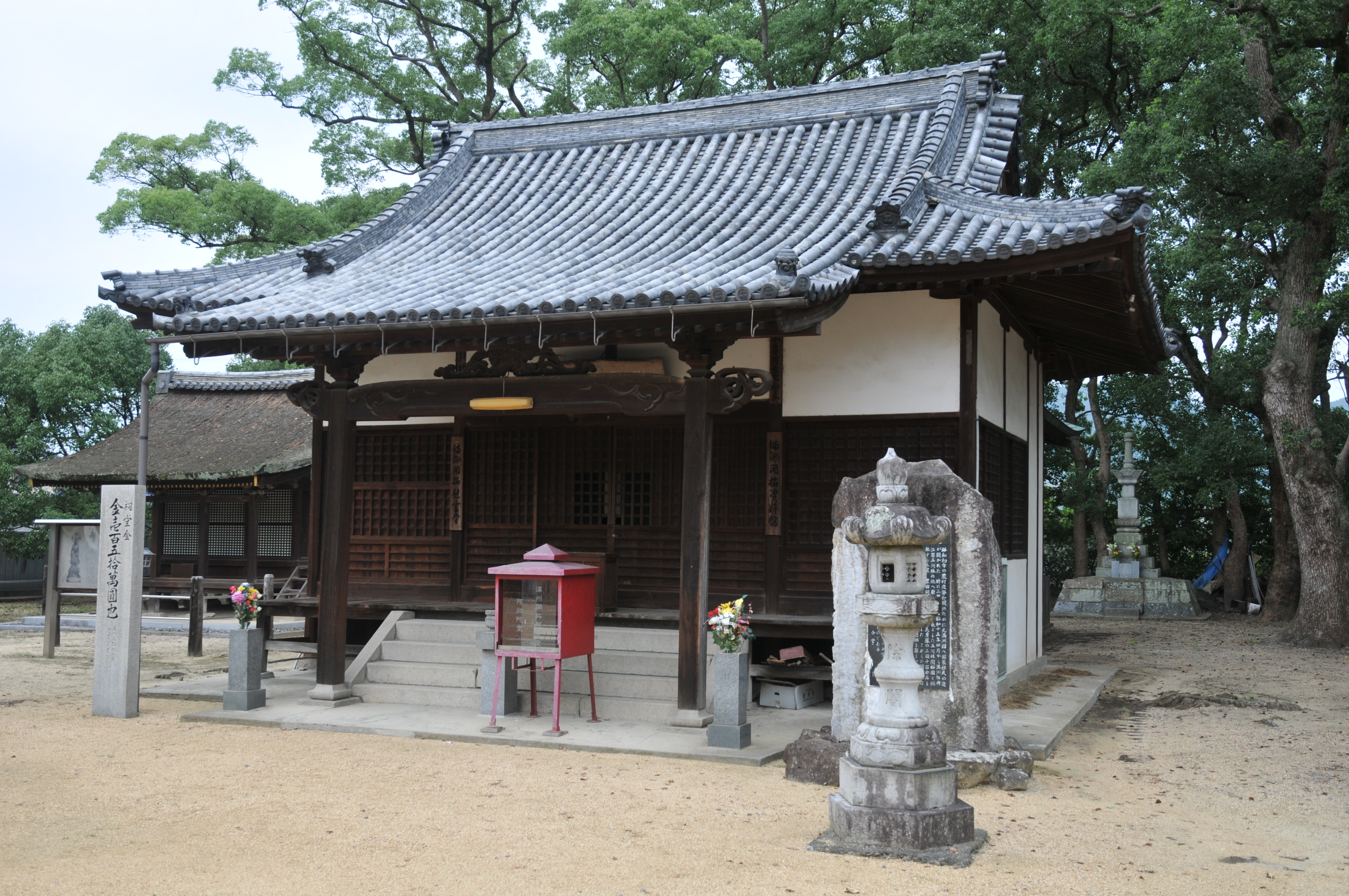
Amidadō
