= The Kagawa Museum =

- 香川県立ミュージアム
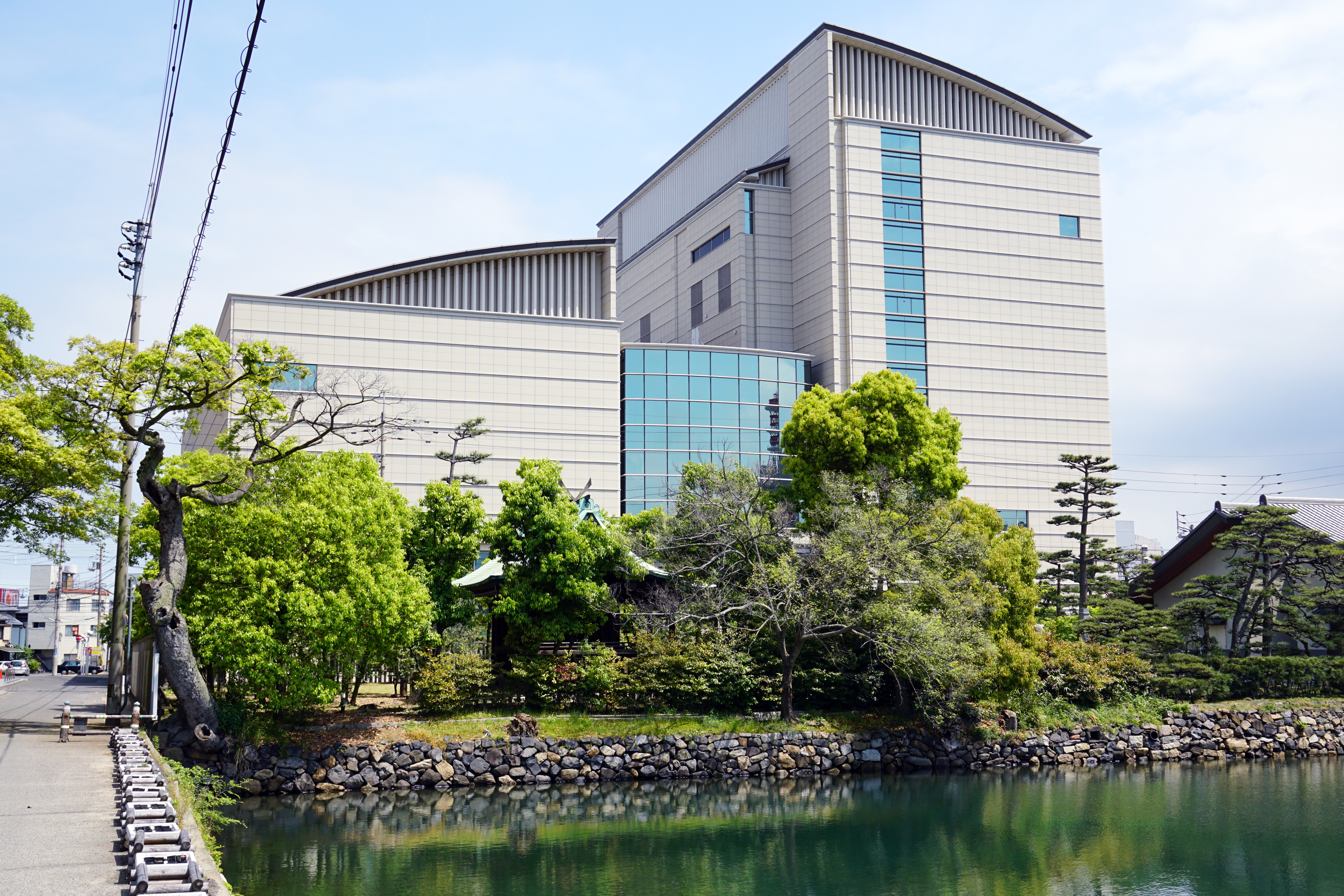
- Interactive map of the The Kagawa Museum area

General information
- Location: 5-5 Tamamo-chō, Takamatsu, Kagawa Prefecture, Japan
- Coordinates: 34°20′59″N 134°3′12″E
- Opened: 1 April 2008

Website
- homepage

The Kagawa Museum (香川県立ミュージアム, Kagawa Kenritsu Myūjiamu) is a prefectural museum in Takamatsu, Japan, dedicated to the history and art of Kagawa Prefecture. The museum opened in 2008, consolidating the three institutions of the Kagawa Prefectural Cultural Hall (香川県文化会館, Kagawa-ken Bunka Kaikan) (opened 1966); Seto Inland Sea Folk History Museum (瀬戸内海歴史民俗資料館, Seto-Naikai Rekishi Minzoku Shiryōkan) (opened 1973); and Kagawa History Museum (香川県歴史博物館, Kagawa-ken Rekishi Hakubutsukan) (opened 1999); the first two institutions now operate as annexes of The Kagawa Museum.

== See also ==
- Sanuki Province
- List of Historic Sites of Japan (Kagawa)
- Takamatsu Castle (Sanuki)
