= Kotohira-gū =

Shinto shrine in Kagawa Prefecture, Japan

Kotohira-gū (金刀比羅宮)
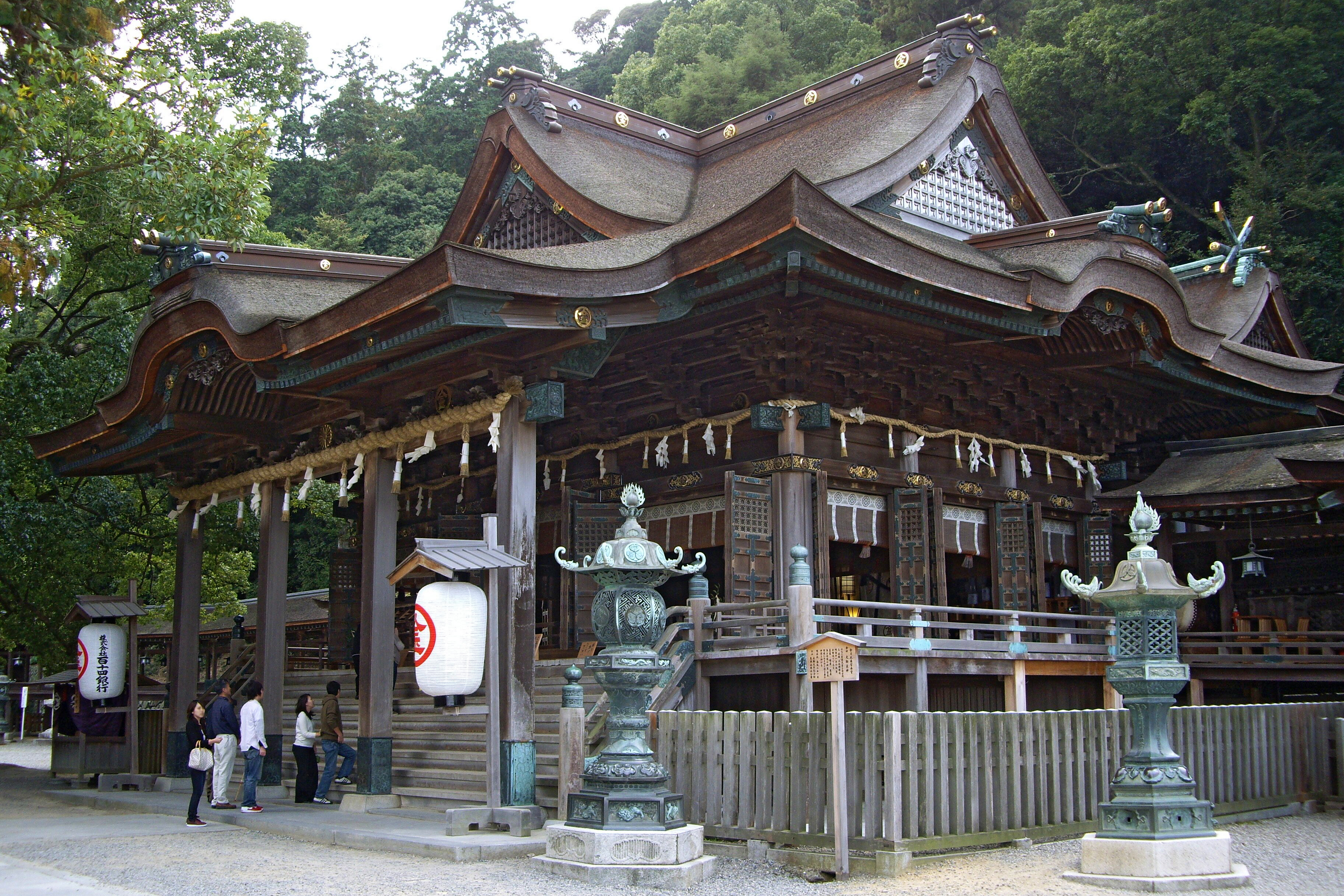
- Haiden of main shrine (本宮 hon-gū), Kotohira Shrine

- Location within Japan

Religion
- Affiliation: Shinto
- Deity: Ōmononushi (Konpira Gongen)

Location
- Coordinates: 34°11′03″N 133°48′35″E

Konpira shrine scenes, 2021

Kotohira-gū (金刀比羅宮) (also known by the nickname Konpira-san (こんぴらさん) or Konpira Shrine in English) is a Shinto shrine in the town of Kotohira in Kagawa Prefecture, Japan. Prior to the separation of Shinto and Buddhism in the Meiji era, its name was Konpira Daigongen (金毘羅大権現). The shrine is believed to be a guardian of sailors and fishermen, though its faith also has aspects of mountain worship due to its location on the holy Mount Zōzu.

The shrine's principal kami is Ōmononushi, and the shrine is also dedicated to Emperor Sutoku. It is the head shrine of a network of approximately 600 Kotohira shrines throughout the country.

The shrine is famous for the long staircase leading up to the shrine, with 785 steps from the town below to the main shrine which is 251 meters above sea level and another 583 steps to the inner shrine which is 421 meters above sea level for a total of 1,368 steps.

When the economic conditions of the Muromachi period allowed commoners to begin traveling, trips to shrines started to become more common. Hundreds of thousands of visitors were making their way every year to Kotohira-gū (then Konpira Daigongen) in the Edo period. A 2023 study by the Kagawa Prefecture Tourism Association found that while the number of visitors to the shrine stayed around three million per year in the early 2000s, this number declined during the COVID pandemic, though it rebounded to nearly two million in 2022.

== History ==
It is unknown when Kotohira-gū was founded, but it is believed that it was in the Heian period that worship of Ōmononushi had begun to draw together into a shrine by the name of Kotohira Shrine (琴平神社, Kotohira Jinja).

At the end of the classical era, the shrine merged with Matsuo-ji (松尾寺), a Buddhist temple of the Shingon sect located on the same site, to create a single Shinto-Buddhist organization by the name of Konpira Daigongen (金毘羅大権現) where it began to also worship Konpira Gongen. Emperor Sutoku was enshrined as well in 1165.

The ema hall is the site for offering prayers for safe seafaring. The Konpira temple was transformed into a Shinto shrine and renamed Kotohira in 1889.

From 1871 through 1946, Kotohira was officially designated one of the kokuhei-chūsha (国幣中社), meaning that it stood in the mid-range of ranked, nationally significant shrines.

On June 5, 2020, Kotohira Shrine sent a notice to the Association of Shinto Shrines stating that it would abolish its inclusive relationship, due to the fact that the heihaku to be delivered on the day of the Daijō-sai accompanying the enthronement of the Emperor in the first year of Reiwa (2019) was not sent. In November 2020, the withdrawal from the Association was approved and it became a standalone shrine.

== Faith and customs ==
Kotohira-gū has a custom of dairi sanpai (代理参拝) also known as daisan (代参) in which someone travels to a shrine to pray to the kami on another's behalf. One such method of daisan unique to Kotohira-gū involves an individual writing their name on a piece of wood and releasing it into the Seto Inland Sea. Visitors to the shrine may also purchase kamiyo ame (加美代飴), yellow, fan-shaped candies, to take back to those who were unable to visit the shrine which they then share by breaking into pieces with small hammers, thus sharing the blessings of the shrine. These candies may only be made and sold by five families known as the Gonin Byakushō (五人百姓) who also assist with shrine affairs.

== Matsuo-ji ==
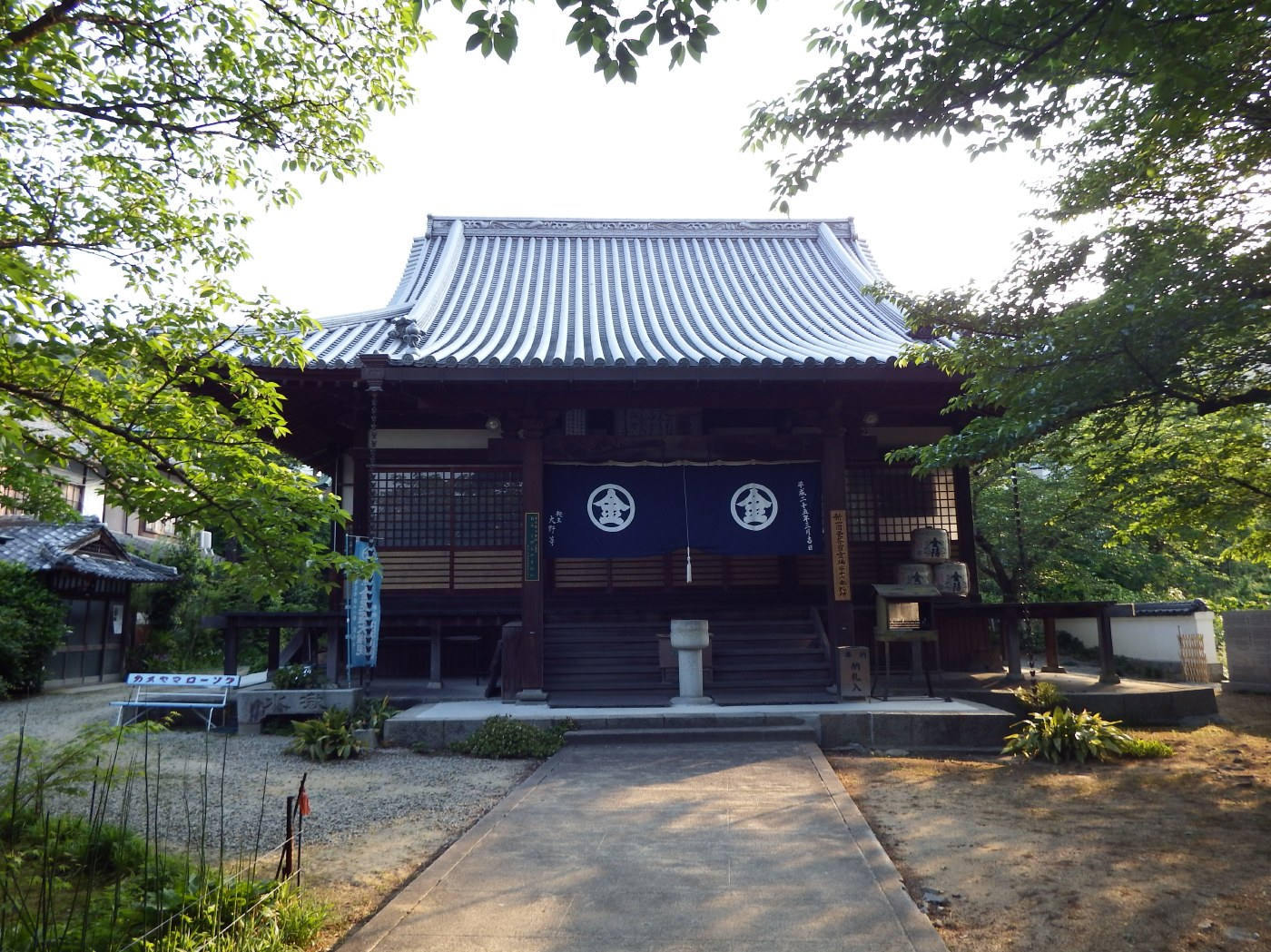
Matsuo-ji

Matsuo-ji is a temple located nearby that used to run Kotohira-gu. It is affiliated with the Koyasan Shingon sect.

It was founded by En no Gyōja when he had a vision of Konpira Gongen at the site.

== Treasures ==
Kompira Shrine has several Important Cultural Properties, including a Heian period statue of the eleven-faced Kannon Bosatsu and four ink paintings by Maruyama Ōkyo.

== Gallery ==
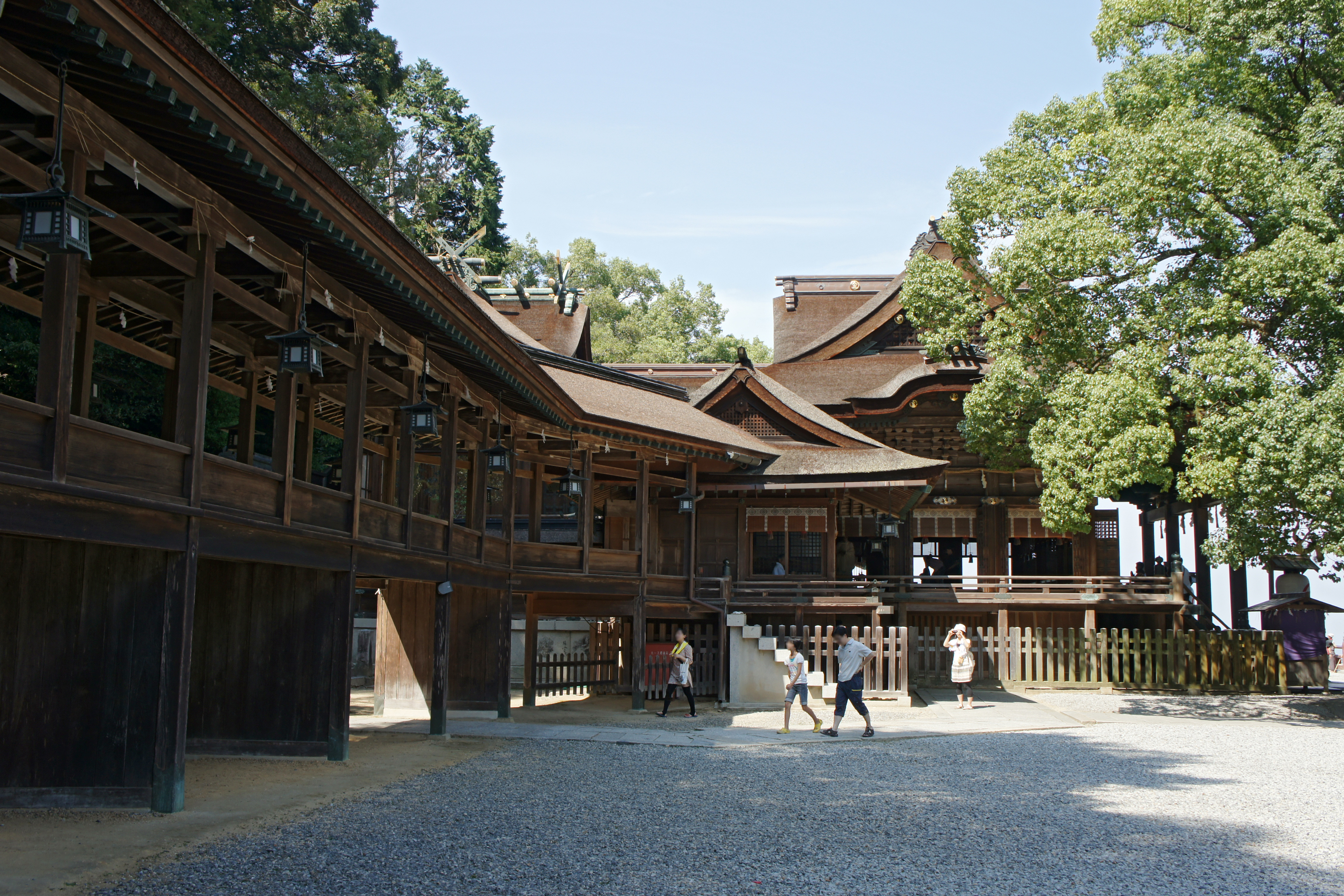
Hongū (main shrine) complex

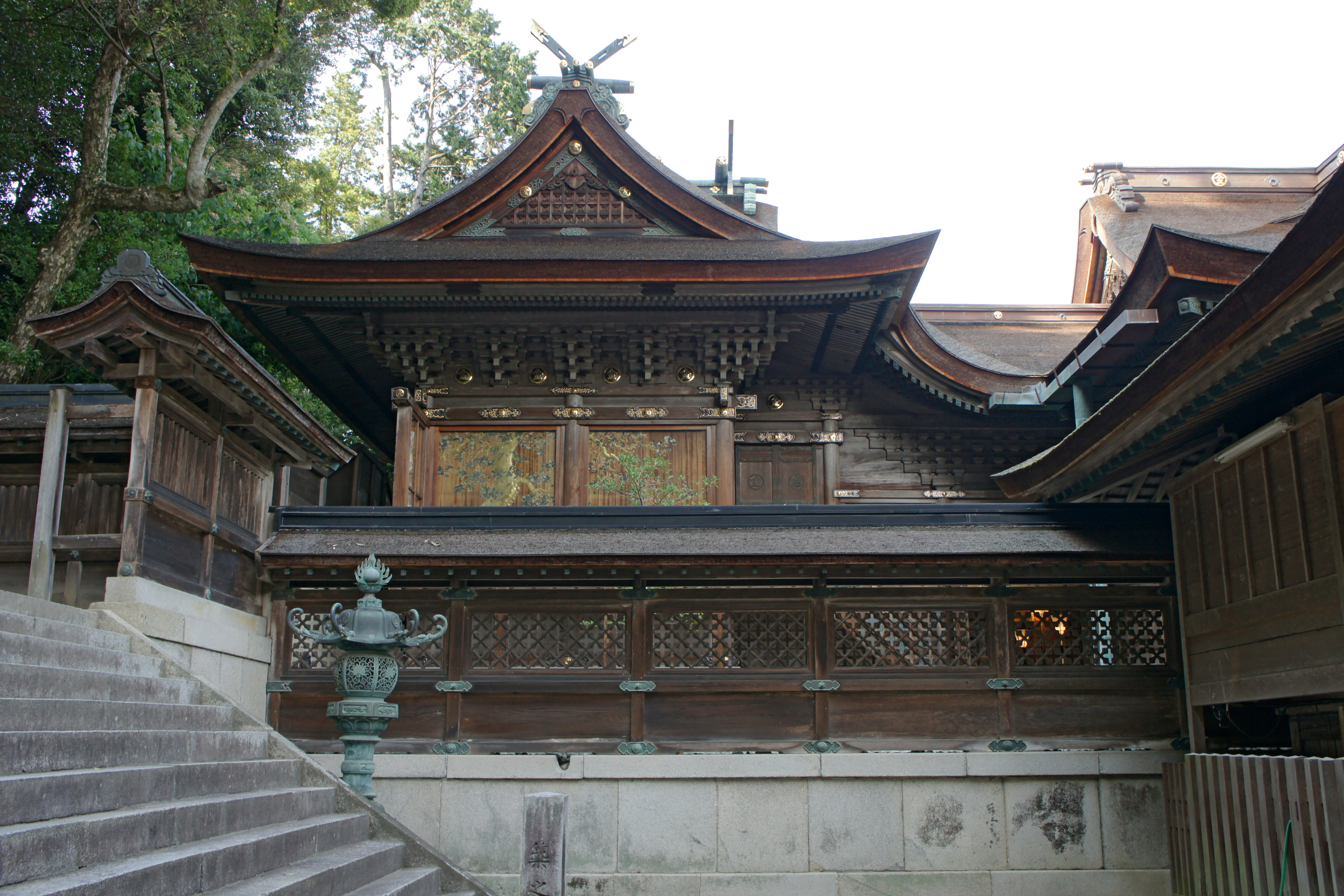
Honden of the hongū

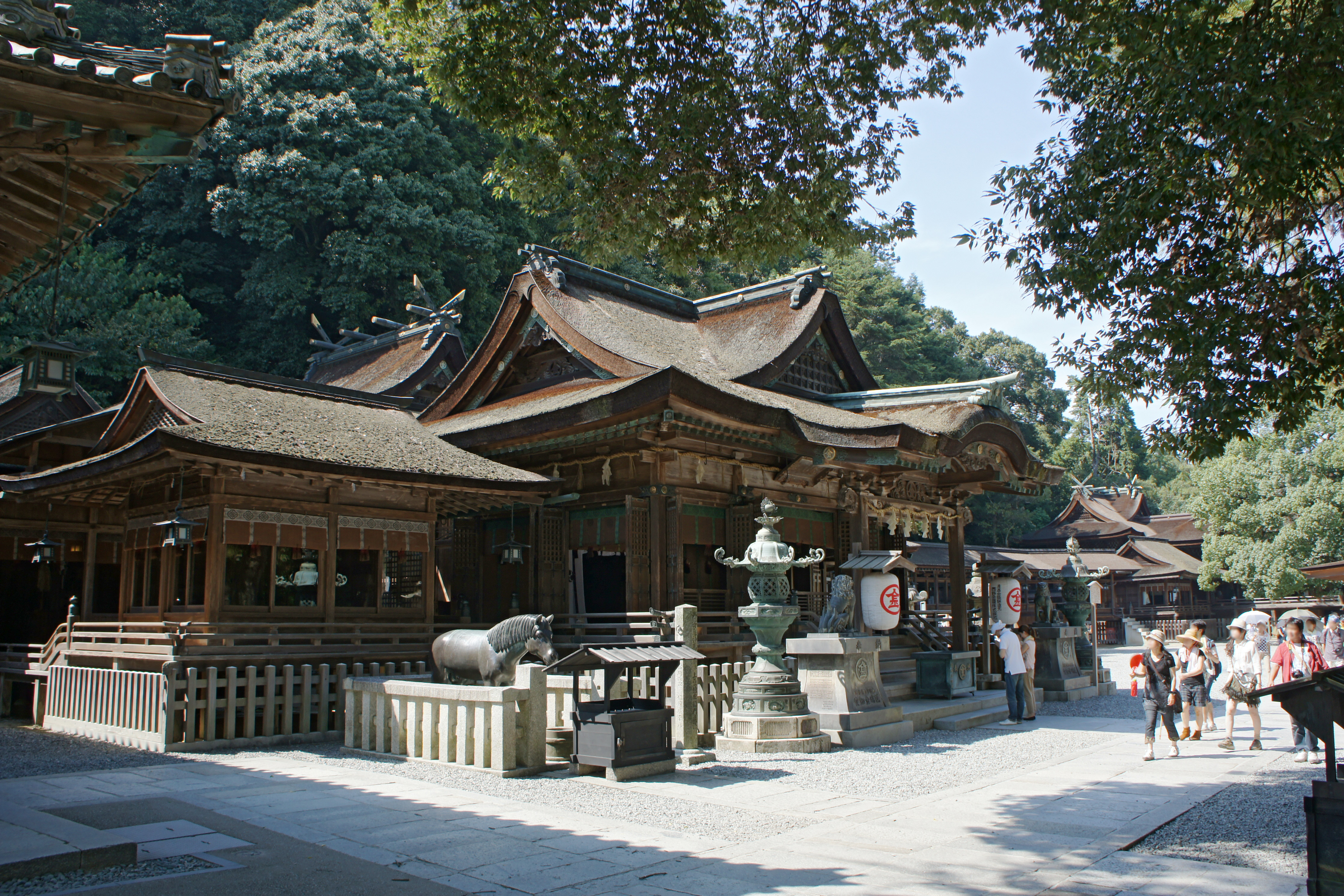
Mihotsu Jinja's haiden of the hongū

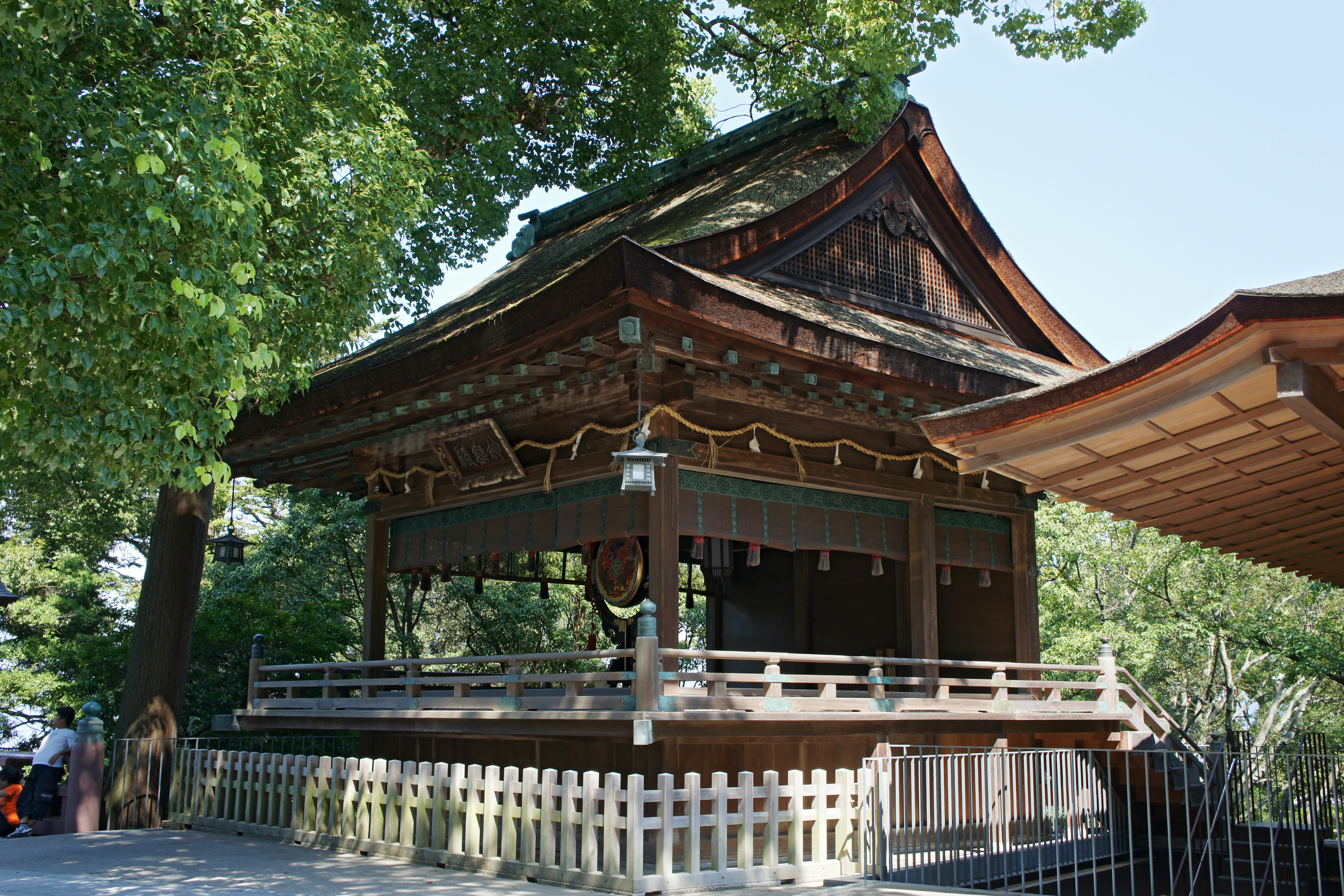
Kaguraden of the hongū

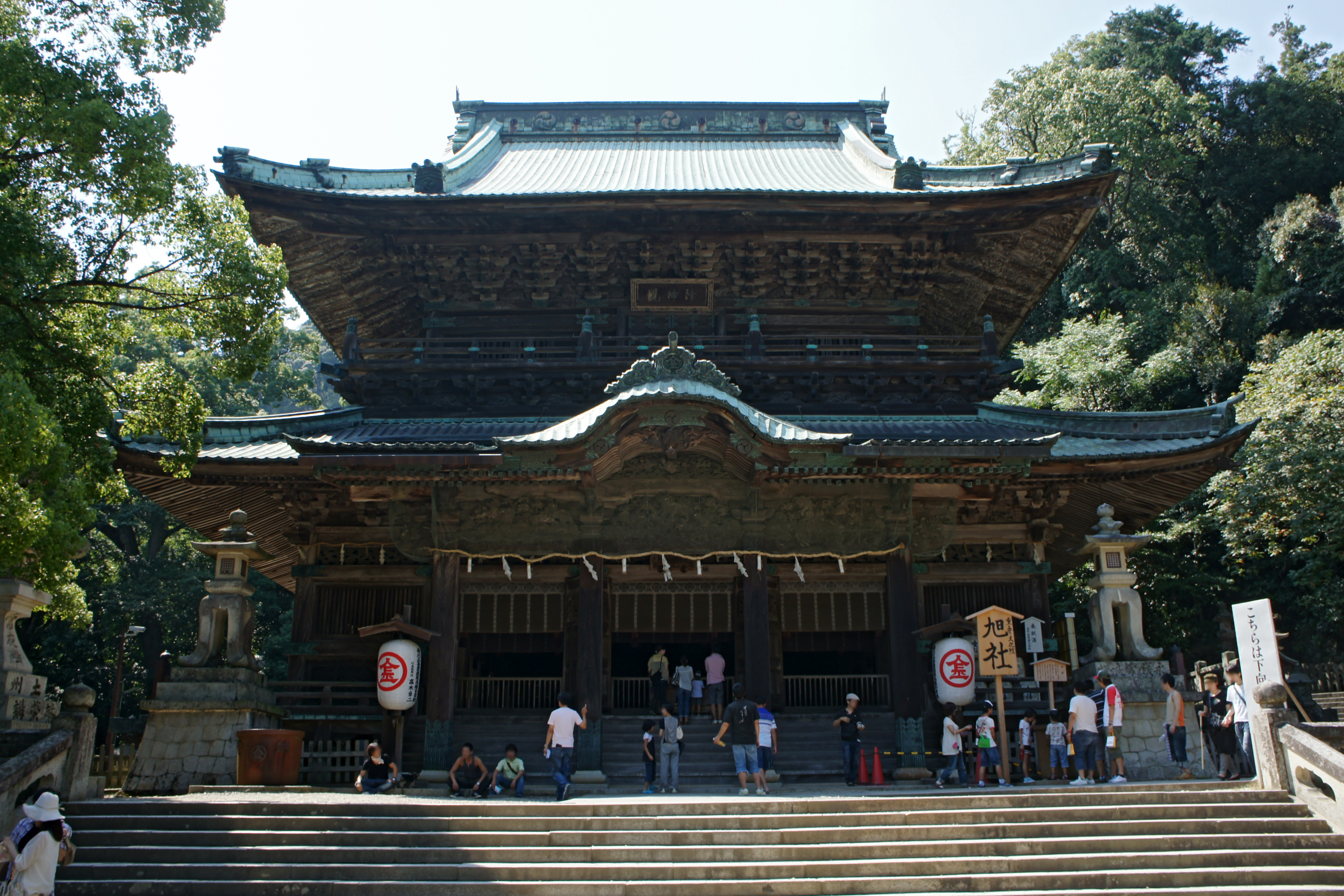
Asahi-sha

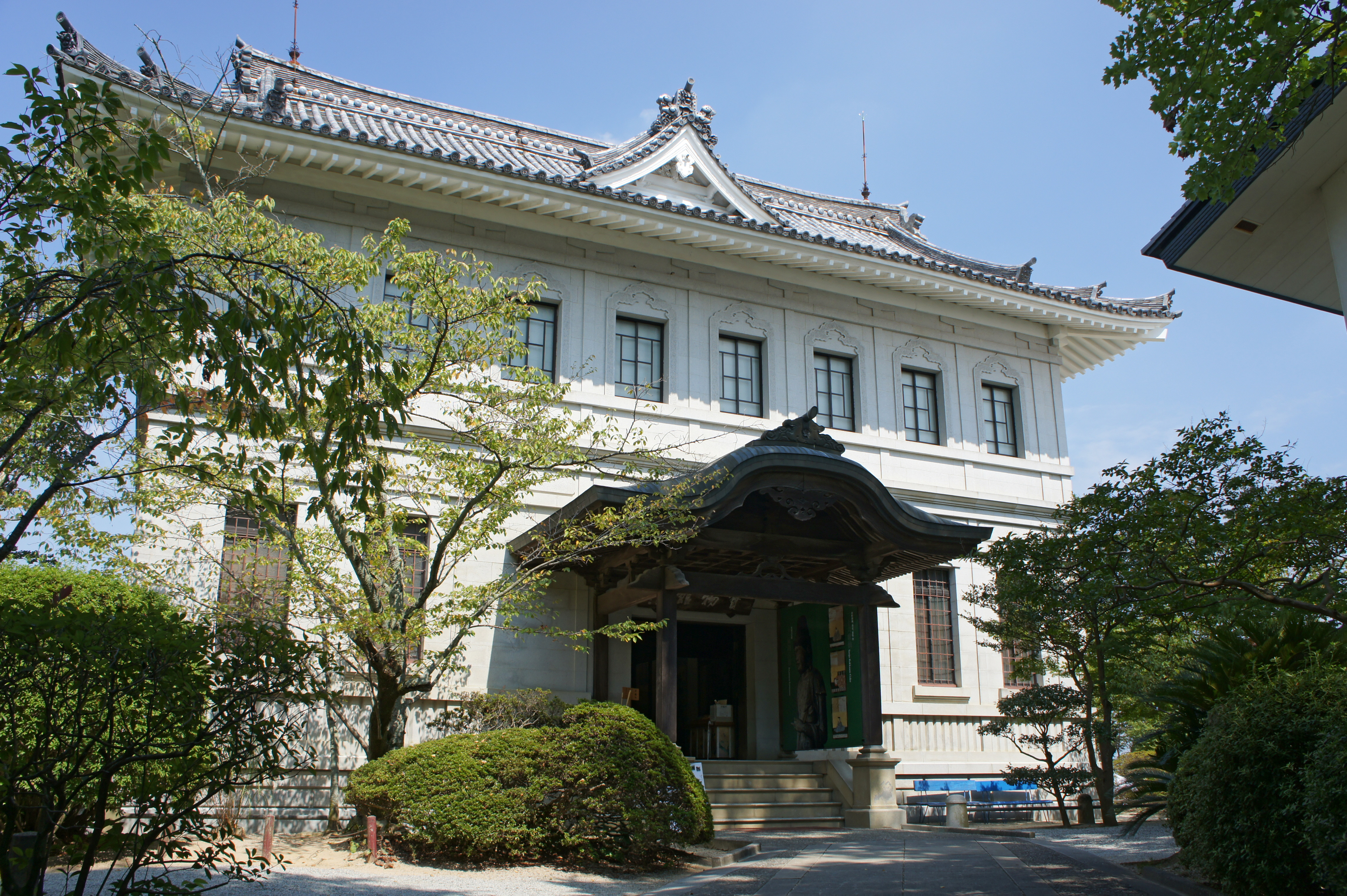
Homotsukan museum

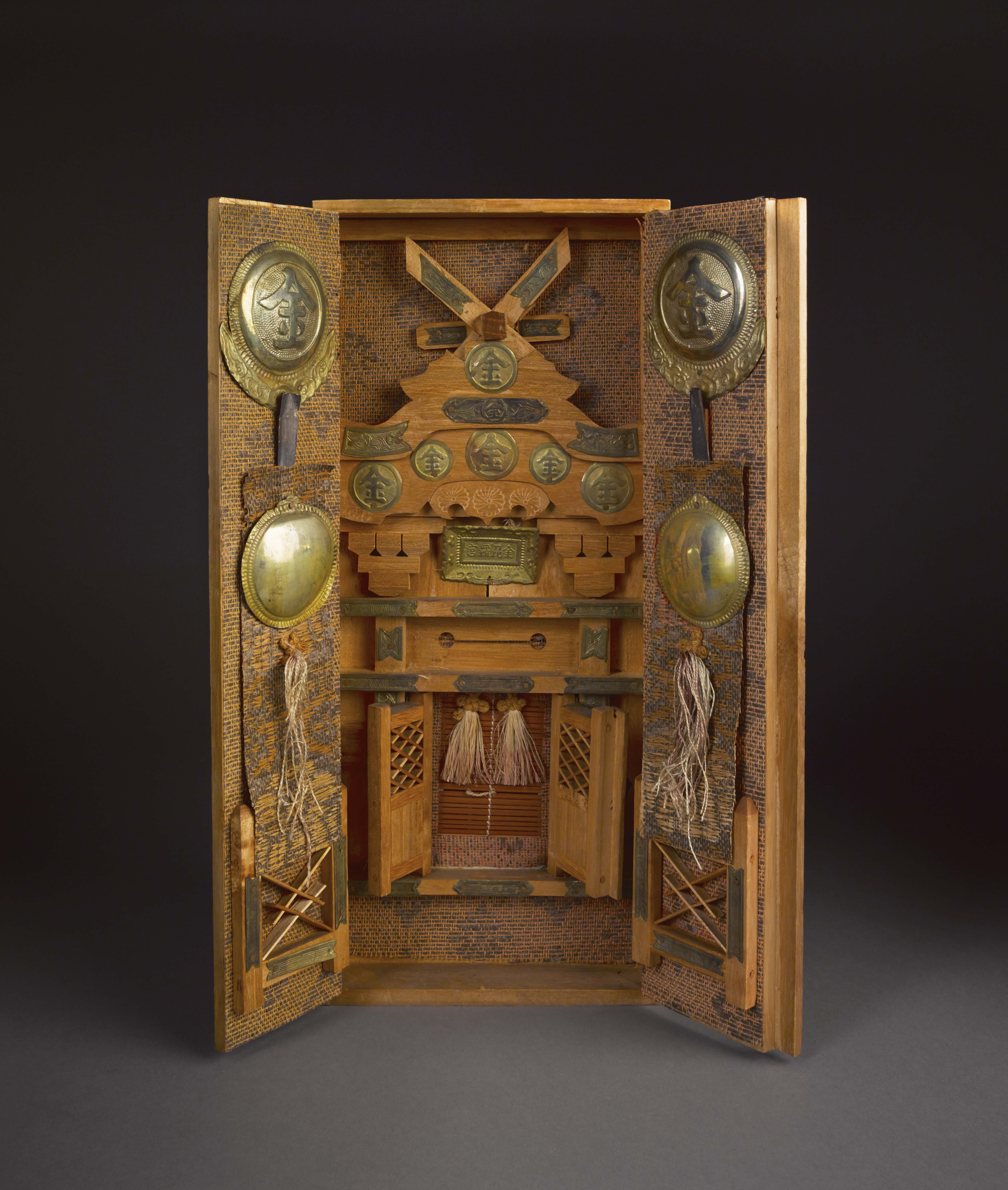
Kompira Shrine Votive Box, c. 1800–1894, from the Oxford College Archives of Emory University

== See also ==
- List of Shinto shrines in Japan
- Tourism in Japan

== Bibliography ==
- Aiba, Sōshi; Nishikado, Saki; Harada, Kazuhiro (2023). "香川県金刀比羅宮における森林管理と利害関係者の関わりの現状" [A study of stakeholder involvement in forest management at Kotohira-gū in Kagawa Prefecture]. Applied Forest Science. 32 (1): 3–9. doi:10.20660/applfor.32.1_3 – via Jstage.
- Ishimori, Shuzo (1989-12-28). "Popularization and Commercialization of Tourism in Early Modern Japan". Senri Ethnological Studies (in Japanese). 26: 179–194. doi:10.15021/00003196. ISSN 0387-6004.
- Ogawa, Manako (2022). "Konpira-san as Enemy Asset: The Contestation and Confrontation over the Interpretation of a Shinto Sea Deity and the Kotohira Jinsha v. McGrath Case in 1949" (PDF). The Japanese Journal of American Studies. 33 (45–65).
