= Kagomori Castle =

Castle ruins in Ehime, Japan

- 河後森城
- Matsuno, Ehime, Ehime Prefecture, Japan

Site information
- Type: Mountaintop castle
- Owner: Watanabe clan
- Condition: ruins

Location
- Kagomori Castle Kagomori Castle (Japan)
- Coordinates: 33°13′25.0″N 132°42′31.0″E

Site history
- Built: 12C
- Built by: Watanabe clan
- Demolished: 1615

Garrison information
- Past commanders: Toda Katsutaka
- National Historic Site of Japan

Kagomori Castle (河後森城, Kagomori-jō) was a Sengoku period Japanese castle located in the Matsumaru neighborhood of the town of Matsuno, Ehime Prefecture, Japan. Its ruins have been protected as a National Historic Site since 1997.

== History ==
Kagomori Castle is located on a hill bordered by the Hiromi-gawa river in the center of the town of Matsuno, in the southern Ehime prefecture. The Hiromi-gawa river is a major tributary of Shimanto River, one of the major rivers on the island of Shikoku, and its river valley was an important route between the Dogo Plain of former Iyo Province and Kochi Plain of former Tosa Province, and in modern times was used as the route for the Yodo Line railway. It is unknown when this strategic chokepoint was first fortified, but it appears to have been in the 14th century by the local Watanabe clan, on the main retainers of the Saionji family who dominated southwestern Iyo Province. The Saionji were court nobility from Kyoto and maintained close relations with the Tosa-Ichijō clan who held the estate of Nakamura on the opposite side of the border.

In the middle of 16th century, the Ichijō allied with the aggressive Ōtomo clan from Bungo Province, and invaded Iyo province in 1568. The Saionji turned to the Mōri clan for assistance, and after a year were able to push the Ichijō out of Iyo. However, the lord of Kagomori Castle, Watanabe Noritada, who was a member of the Ichijō who had been adopted into the Saionji, remained neutral. Weakened by the conflict, the Ichijō were conquered by Chōsokabe Motochika, who then turned his attention back to Iyo Province. The Chōsokabe invaded in 1577, and the Saionji defended well against this superior enemy for five years. Kagomori Castle held out to 1580 after having been betrayed from within, and the Saionji finally surrendered in 1584. However, the very next year, Toyotomi Hideyoshi launched an invasion of Shikoku and quickly forced the Chōsokabe back to Tosa Province. Kagomori Castle was assigned to Kobayakawa Takakage, one of Hideyoshi's generals, and he was reassigned to Kyushu in 1587. Kagomori Castle then became part of the holdings of Toda Katsutaka. In contrast to the Kobayakawa, the Toda ruled with extreme harshness, murdering the descendants of the Saionji family and thinking nothing of robbery, rape and murder of the local inhabitants. When ordered to send troops to the invasion of Korea in 1592, he cut down large trees in shrines and temples throughout his domain to construct ships. He went insane during the campaign, and died in Korea without heir. Hideyoshi then assigned Tōdō Takatora to the domain. A noted castle designer, Takatora rebuilt Uwajima Castle and also modernized Kagomori Castle as a secondary fortification against a possible resurgence of the Chōsokabe. It is said that Tōdō Takatora relocated tenshu from Kagomori Castle to either Imabari Castle or Uwajima Castle for use as a yagura watchtower. Under the Tokugawa shogunate, the area became part of the holdings of the Date clan of Uwajima Domain. However, with the "one country, one castle" policy of the shogunate, Kagomori Castle was abandoned in 1615.

== Current situation ==
Kagomori Castle extended over a 500-meter length of the hill. As was common for the time, it consisted of ten enclosures spread along the ridge of the hill, separated by clay walls and dry moats. No buildings remain of the castle, but the structure of the castle has been determined by remnants of stone walls, moats and based on the result of archaeological excavation.

The castle was listed as one of the Continued Top 100 Japanese Castles in 2017. It is located approximately a 20-minute walk from JR Shikoku Matsumaru Station. A gate has been reconstructed.

== See also ==
- List of Historic Sites of Japan (Ehime)
