= Futana Station =

Railway station in Uwajima, Ehime Prefecture, Japan

G43 Futana Station 二名駅
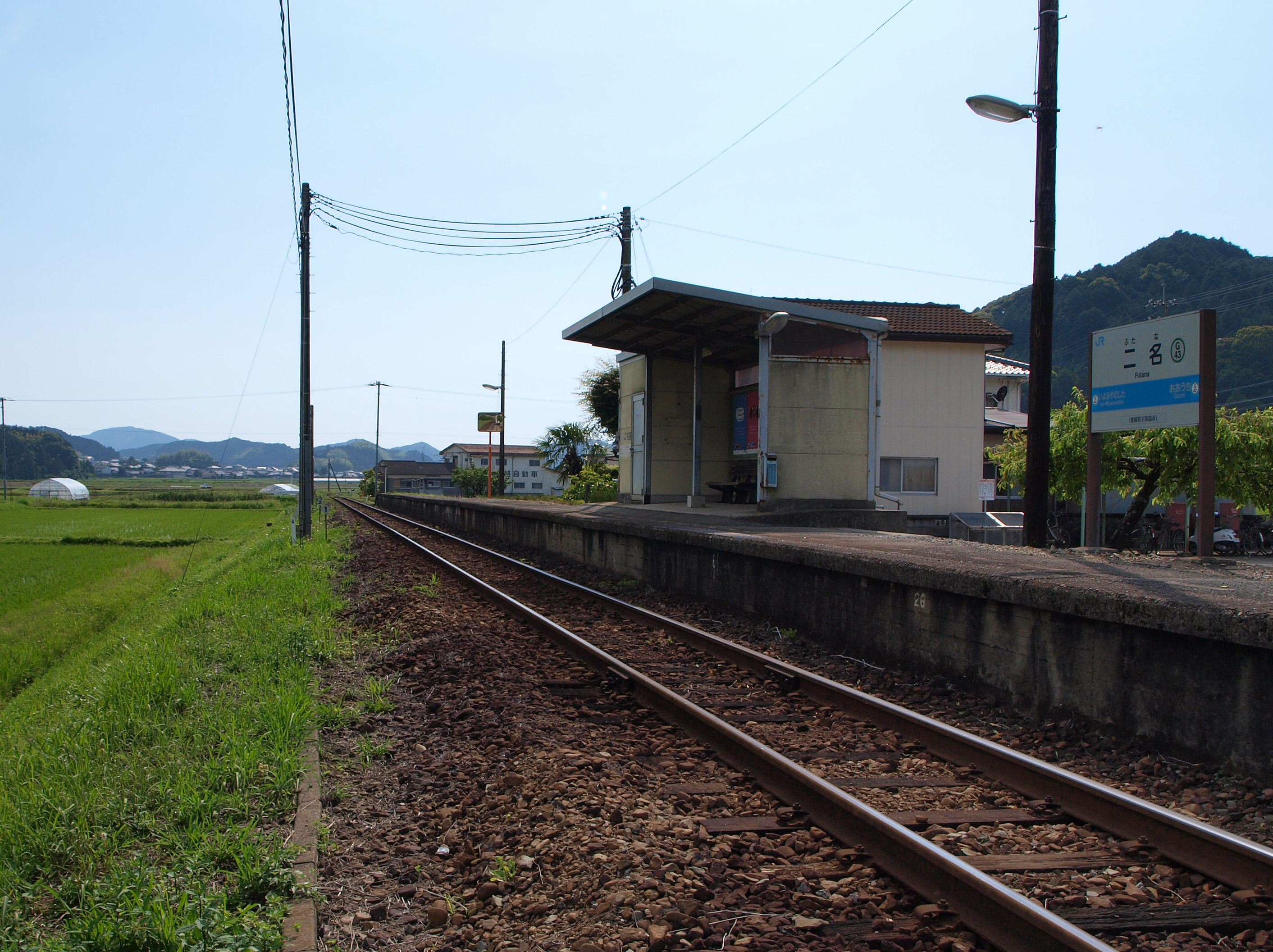
- Futana Station in 2010

General information
- Location: Mimachō Nakanonaka, Uwajima-shi, Ehime-ken 798-1133; Japan
- Coordinates: 33°17′29″N 132°37′45″E
- Operator: JR Shikoku
- Line: ■ Yodo Line
- Distance: 66.9 km from Wakai
- Platforms: 1 side platform
- Tracks: 1

Construction
- Parking: Available
- Cycle facilities: Bike shed
- Accessible: No - steps needed to reach platform

Other information
- Status: Unstaffed
- Station code: G43

History
- Opened: 18 October 1914
- Former names: Nakano (to 1933)

Passengers
- FY2018: 36
Location
- Location within Ehime Prefecture Location within Japan

Futana Station (二名駅, Futana-eki) is a passenger railway station located in the city of Uwajima, Ehime Prefecture, Japan. It is operated by JR Shikoku and has the station number "G43".

== Lines ==
The station is served by JR Shikoku's Yodo Line and is located 66.9 km from the beginning of the line at Wakai.

== Layout ==
The station, which is unstaffed, consists of a side platform serving a single track. A shelter is provided on the platform for waiting passengers. A flight of steps is needed to reach the platform from the access road and the station is thus not wheelchair accessible. A parking area and bike shed are provided.

== Adjacent stations ==
«	Service	»
Yodo Line
Ōuchi	Local	Iyo-Miyanoshita

== History ==
The station opened on 18 October 1914 as Nakano Station (中野駅), a through-station on the narrow-gauge line from Uwajima to Chikanaga owned by the Uwajima Railway (宇和島鉄道). With the nationalization of the Uwajima Railway on 1 August 1933, the station came under the control of Japanese Government Railways (JGR), later becoming Japanese National Railways (JNR) and was renamed Futana.

With the privatization of JNR on 1 April 1987, control passed to JR Shikoku.

== Surrounding area ==
Ehime Prefectural Route 283 passes in front of the station. Although the surrounding fields are widely spread, private houses are also scattered. There is a kamaboko factory on the southeast side of the station.

== See also ==
- List of railway stations in Japan
