= Ouchi Station =

Ouchi Station may refer to:

- Ōuchi Station, a railway station on the Yodo Line in Uwajima, Ehime Prefecture, Japan.
- Ouchi station (Ningbo Rail Transit), a metro station in Ningbo, Zhejiang Province, China.
