= Iyo-Miyanoshita Station =

Railway station in Uwajima, Ehime Prefecture, Japan

G44 Iyo-Miyanoshita Station 伊予宮野下駅
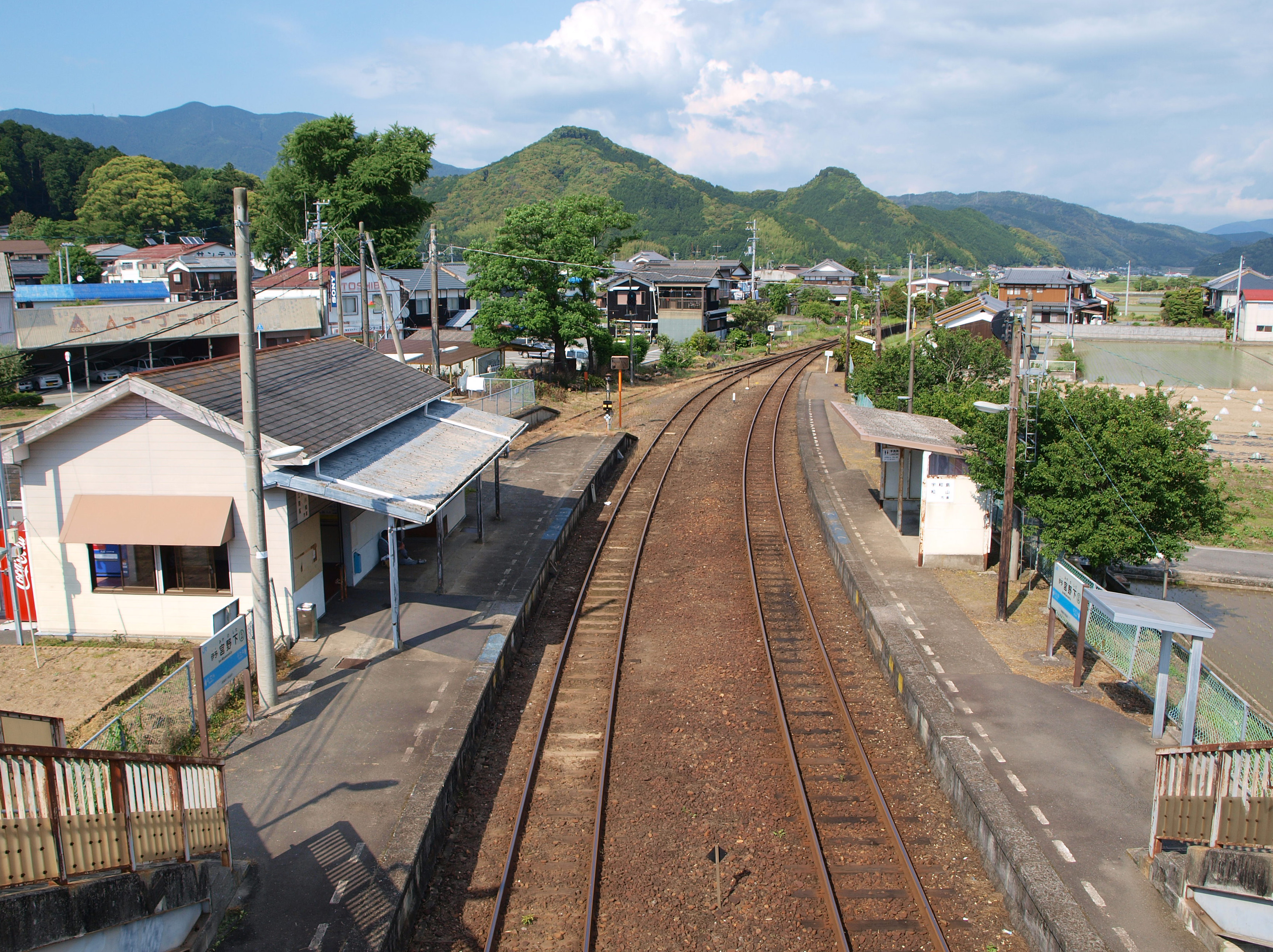
- Iyo-Miyanoshita Station in 2010

General information
- Location: Mimacho Miyanoshita, Uwajima-shi, Ehime-ken 798-1112; Japan
- Coordinates: 33°17′21″N 132°36′21″E
- Operator: JR Shikoku
- Line: ■ Yodo Line
- Distance: 69.1 km from Wakai
- Platforms: 2 side platforms
- Tracks: 2

Construction
- Parking: Available
- Cycle facilities: Bike shed
- Accessible: No - footbridge needed to reach one platform

Other information
- Status: Unstaffed
- Station code: G44

History
- Opened: 18 October 1914
- Former names: Miyanoshita (until 1933)

Passengers
- FY2018: 220

Services
Preceding station	JR Shikoku	Following station
Muden G45 towards Uwajima	Yodo Line	Futana G43 towards Kubokawa
Location
- Location within Ehime Prefecture Location within Japan

Iyo-Miyanoshita Station (伊予宮野下駅, Iyo-Miyanoshita-eki) is a passenger railway station located in the city of Uwajima, Ehime Prefecture, Japan. It is operated by JR Shikoku and has the station number "G44".

== Lines ==
The station is served by JR Shikoku's Yodo Line and is located 69.1 km from the beginning of the line at Wakai.

== Layout ==
The station, which is unstaffed, consists of two opposed side platforms serving two tracks. A wooden building adjacent to one platform serves as a waiting room for passengers. A footbridge gives access to the other platform across the tracks. A parking area and bike shed are provided.

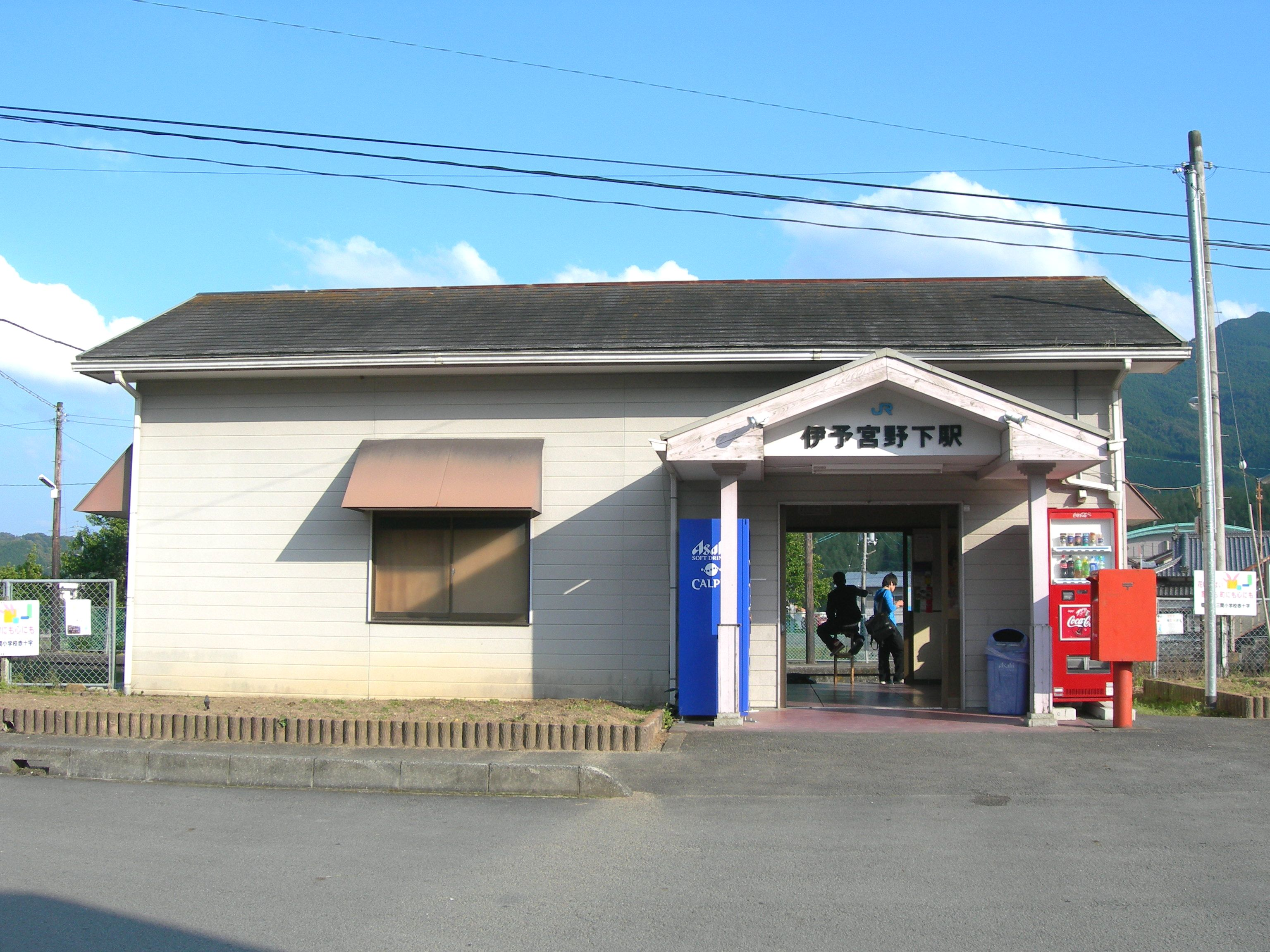
Waiting room of the station.

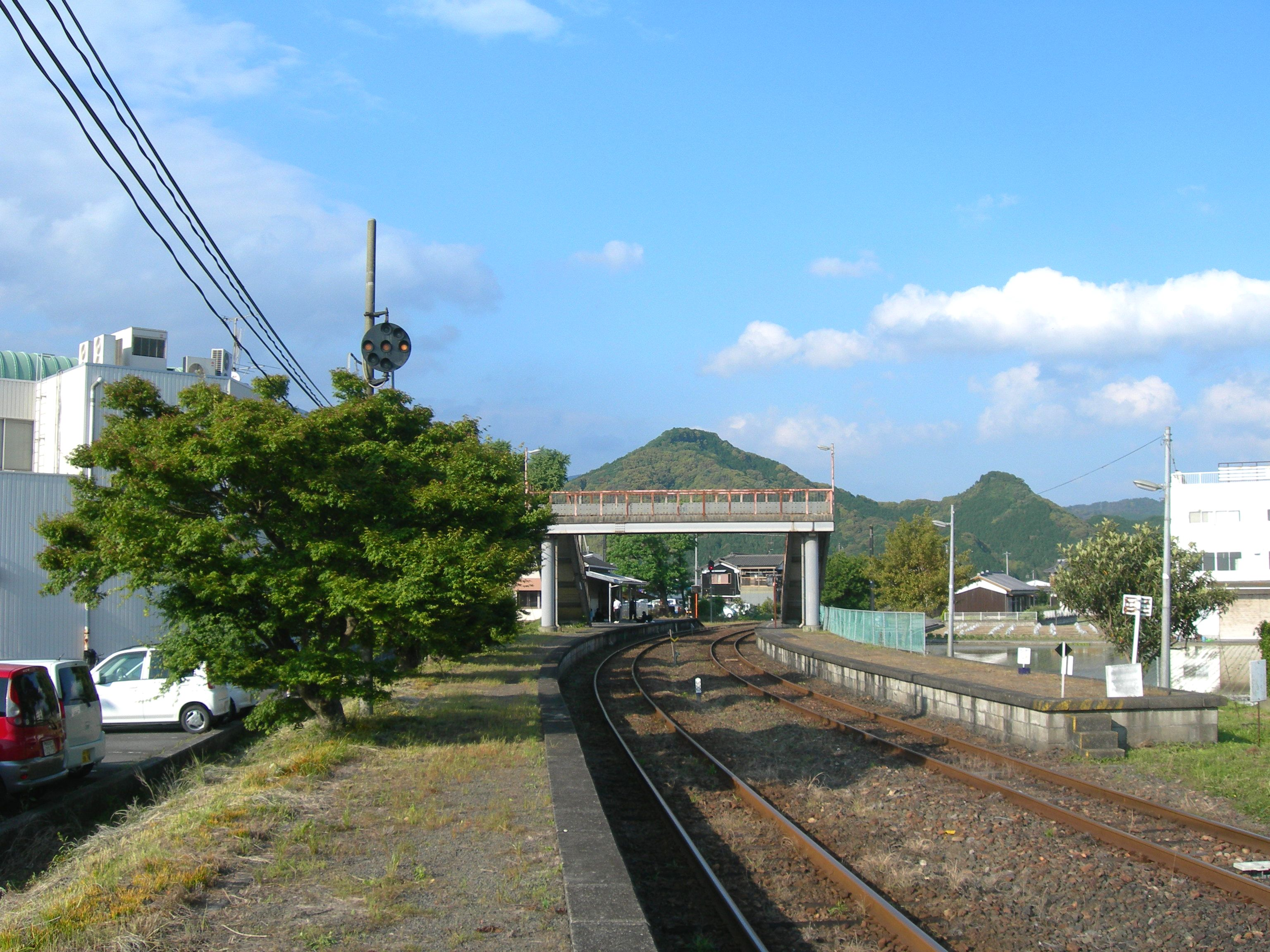
A view of the overhead bridge which gives access to the platform opposite the waiting room.

== History ==
The station opened on 18 October 1914 as Miyanoshita Station (宮野下駅, Miyanoshita-eki), a through-station on the narrow-gauge line from Uwajima to Chikanaga owned by the Uwajima Railway (宇和島鉄道). With the nationalization of Uwajima Railway on 1 August 1933, the station came under the control of Japanese Government Railways (JGR), later becoming Japanese National Railways (JNR), and was renamed Iyo-Miyanoshita. Subsequently, with the privatization of JNR on 1 April 1987, control passed to JR Shikoku.

== Surrounding area ==
- Ryūkōji (龍光寺), the 41st temple on the Shikoku Pilgrimage trail is about 1.3 km to the north-northwest of the station.
- Uwajima City Mima Junior High School
- Uwajima City Mima Elementary School

== See also ==
- List of railway stations in Japan
