= Fukata Station =

Railway station in Kihoku, Ehime Prefecture, Japan

G41 Fukata Station 深田駅
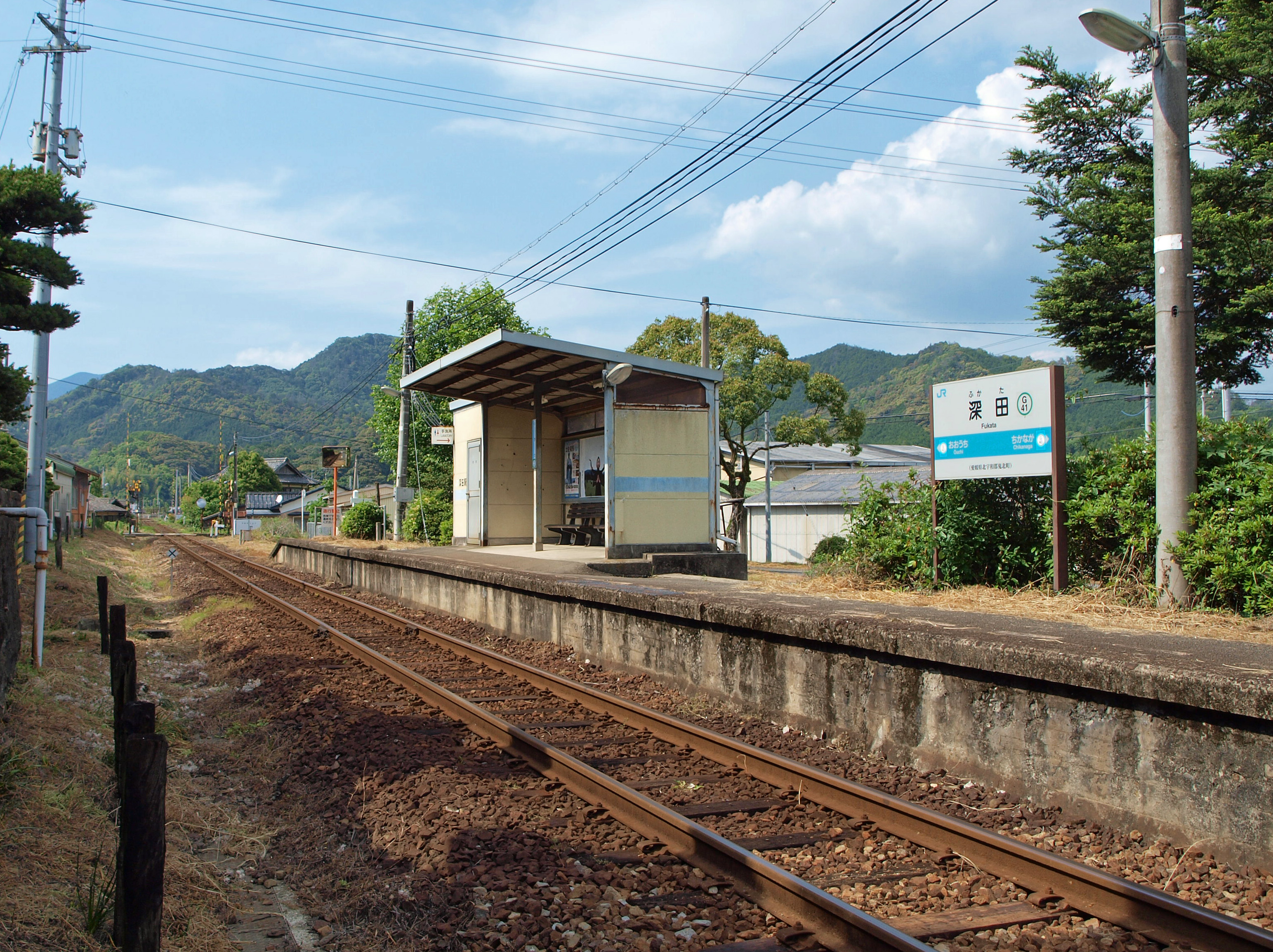
- Fukata Station in 2010

General information
- Location: Uchifukata, Kihoku-chō, Kitauwa-gun, Ehime-ken 798-1363; Japan
- Coordinates: 33°16′03″N 132°39′37″E
- Operator: JR Shikoku
- Line: ■ Yodo Line
- Distance: 62.5 km from Wakai
- Platforms: 1 side platform
- Tracks: 1

Construction
- Parking: Available
- Cycle facilities: Bike shed
- Accessible: No - steps needed to reach platform

Other information
- Status: Unstaffed
- Station code: G41

History
- Opened: 18 October 1914
Location
- Location within Japan

Fukata Station (深田駅, Fukata-eki) is a railway station on the Yodo Line in Kihoku, Kitauwa District, Ehime Prefecture, Japan. It is operated by JR Shikoku and has the station number "G41".

== Lines ==
The station is served by JR Shikoku's Yodo Line and is located 62.5 km from the start of the line at Wakai.

== Layout ==
The station, which is unstaffed, consists of a side platform serving a single track. A shelter is provided on the platform for waiting passengers. Parking space and a bike shed are located behind the platform. A flight of six steps is needed to reach the platform from the access road and the station is thus not wheelchair accessible.

== Adjacent stations ==
«	Service	»
Yodo Line
Chikanaga	Local	Ōuchi

== History ==
The station opened on 18 October 1914 as a through-station on the narrow-gauge line from Uwajima owned by the Uwajima Railway (宇和島鉄道). With the nationalization of the Uwajima Railway on 1 August 1933, the station came under the control of Japanese Government Railways (JGR), later becoming Japanese National Railways (JNR).

With the privatization of JNR on 1 April 1987, control passed to JR Shikoku.

== See also ==
- List of railway stations in Japan
