= Matsumaru Station =

Railway station in Matsuno, Ehime Prefecture, Japan

G38 Matsumaru Station 松丸駅
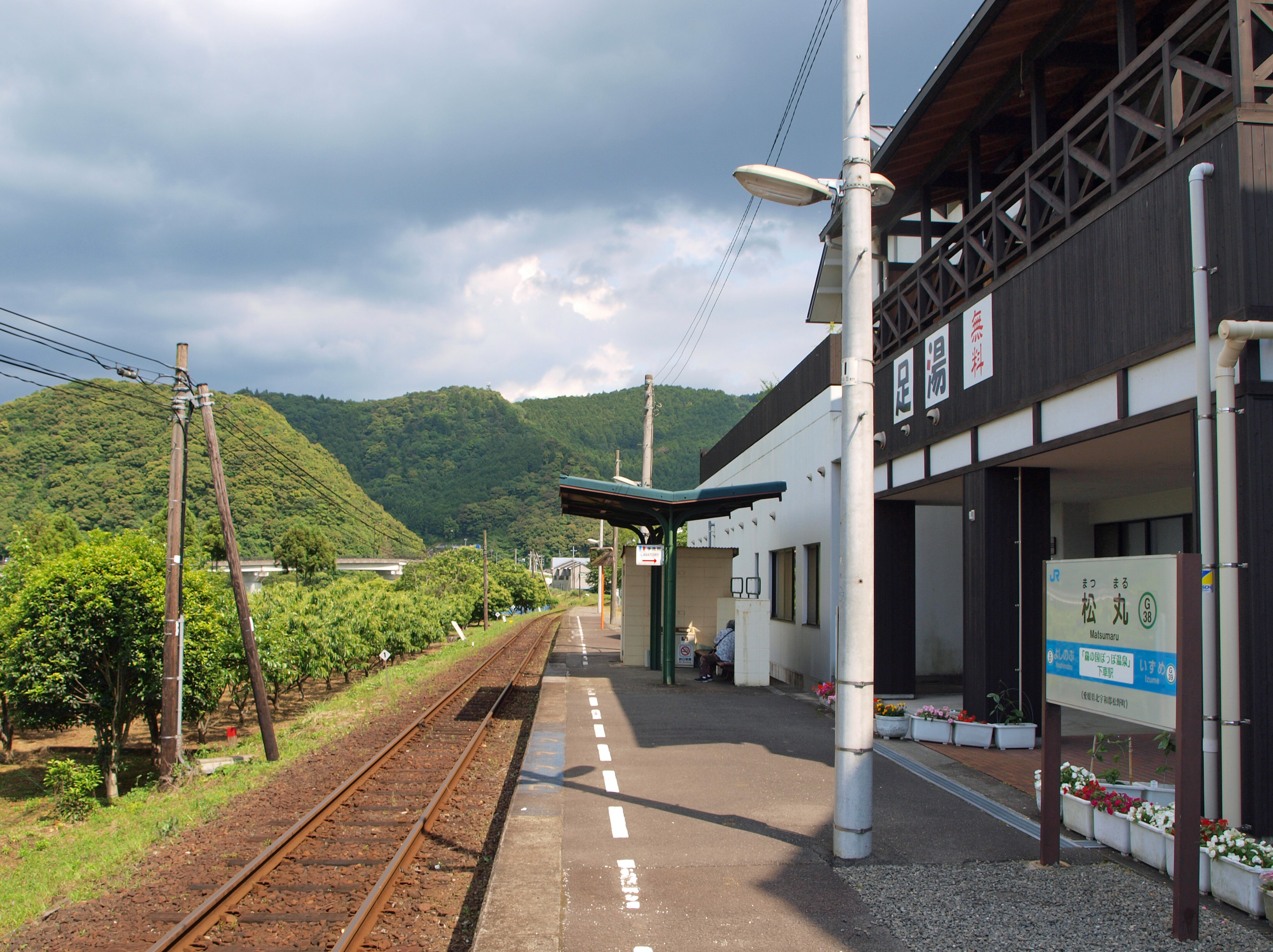
- Platform of Matsumaru Station in 2010

General information
- Location: Matsuno, Matsuno-chō, Kitauwa-gun, Ehime-ken 798-2101; Japan
- Coordinates: 33°13′41.9″N 132°42′32″E
- Operator: JR Shikoku
- Line: ■ Yodo Line
- Distance: 55.3 km from Wakai
- Platforms: 1 side platform
- Tracks: 1

Construction
- Parking: Available

Other information
- Status: Kan'i itaku station
- Station code: G38

History
- Opened: 12 December 1923

Passengers
- FY2018: 116
Location
- Location within Ehime Prefecture Location within Japan

Matsumaru Station (松丸駅, Matsumaru-eki) is a passenger railway station located in the town of Matsuno-chō, Kitauwa District, Ehime Prefecture, Japan. It is operated by JR Shikoku and has the station number "G38".

== Lines ==
The station is served by JR Shikoku's Yodo Line, and is 55.3 kilometers from the starting point of the line at Wakai.

== Layout ==
The station consists of a side platform serving a single track. The station facilities are operated on a kan'i itaku basis by the Matsuno-chō Interaction Centre (a municipal community centre) which provides a waiting room and an information/ticket window. Other civic facilities are co-located in the building including an onsen on the second level. Parking is available outside.

== Adjacent stations ==
«	Service	»
JR Shikoku
Yodo Line
Yoshinobu	-	Izume

== History ==
The station opened on 12 December 1923 as a through-station when a narrow gauge line owned by the Uwajima Railway (宇和島鉄道) from Uwajima to Chikanaga was extended to Yoshinobu (then known as Yoshino). With the nationalization of Uwajima Railway on 1 August 1933, the station came under the control of Japanese Government Railways (JGR), later corporatised as Japan National Railways (JNR). With the privatization of JNR on 1 April 1987, control passed to JR Shikoku.

== Surrounding area ==
- Matsuno - the station is located in the town centre, just off the main shopping street. The town office and local post office are located about 250 metres away.
- Shimanto River - runs next to the station track.
- National Route 381 - runs parallel to the track across the river.
- Morinokunipoppo Hot Spring - an onsen located on level two of the station building.

== See also ==
- List of railway stations in Japan
