= Izume Station =

Railway station in Kihoku, Ehime Prefecture, Japan

G39 Izume Station 出目駅
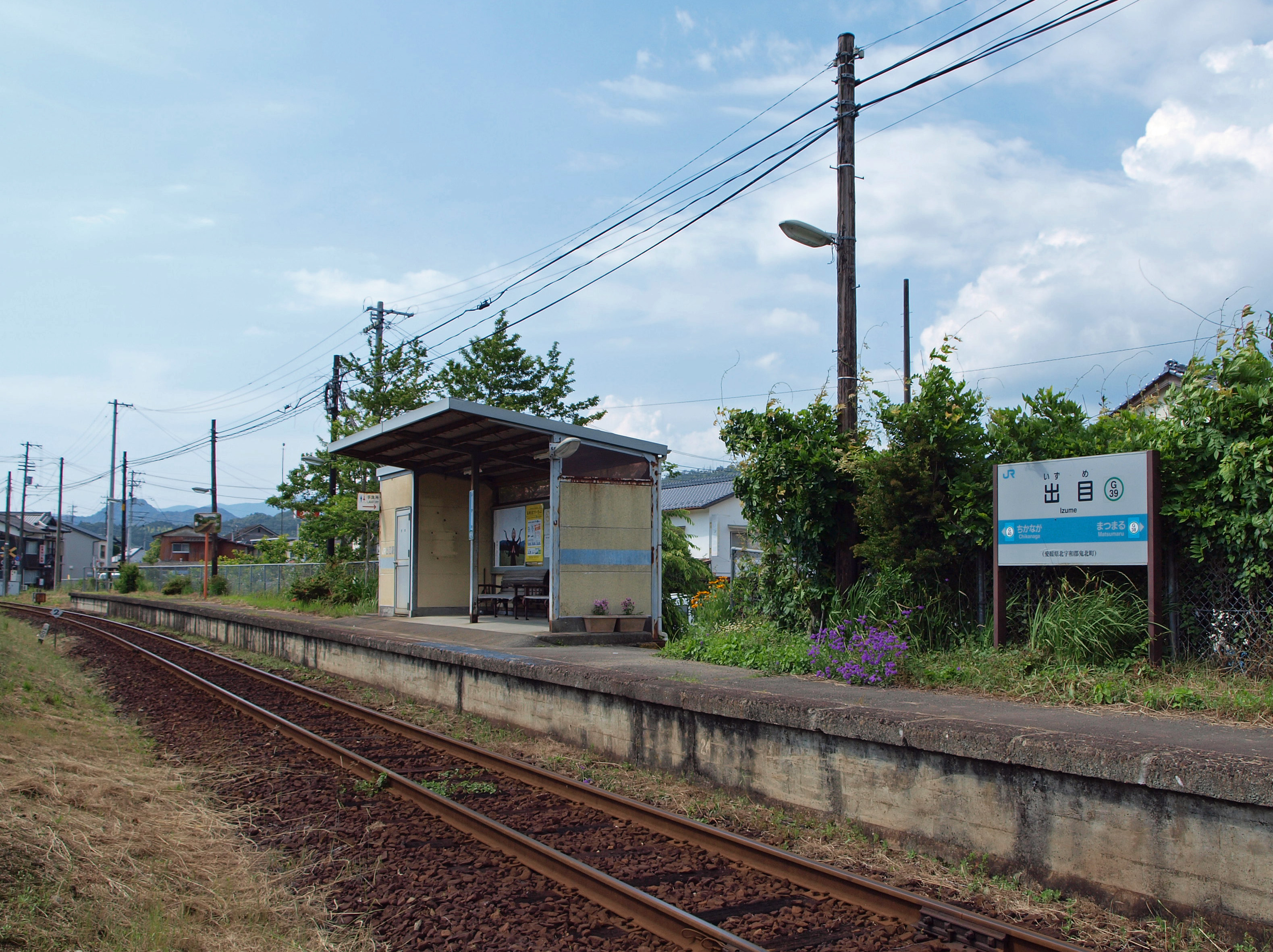
- Platform of Izume Station in 2010

General information
- Location: Izume, Kihoku-chō, Kitauwa-gun, Ehime-ken 798-1332; Japan
- Coordinates: 33°15′06″N 132°41′31″E
- Operator: JR Shikoku
- Line: ■ Yodo Line
- Platforms: 1 side platform
- Tracks: 1

Construction
- Parking: Available
- Cycle facilities: Bike shed
- Accessible: No - steps lead up to platform

Other information
- Status: Unstaffed
- Station code: G39

History
- Opened: 12 December 1923
Location
- Location within Japan

Izume Station (出目駅, Izume-eki) is a railway station on the Yodo Line in Kihoku, Kitauwa District, Ehime Prefecture, Japan. It is operated by JR Shikoku and has the station number "G39".

== Lines ==
Izume Station is served by JR Shikoku's Yodo Line.

== Layout ==
The station, which is unstaffed, consists of a side platform serving a single track. Steps lead up to the platform from the access road and the station is thus not wheelchair accessible. A bike shed, parking for cars and a public telephone call box are available.

== Adjacent stations ==
«	Service	»
Yodo Line
Matsumaru	Local	Chikanaga

== History ==
The station opened on 12 December 1923 as a through-station when a narrow-gauge line owned by the Uwajima Railway (宇和島鉄道) from Uwajima to Chikanaga was extended to Yoshinobu (then known as Yoshino). With the nationalization of the Uwajima Railway on 1 August 1933, the station came under the control of Japanese Government Railways (JGR), later becoming Japanese National Railways (JNR). With the privatization of JNR on 1 April 1987, control passed to JR Shikoku.

== See also ==
- List of railway stations in Japan
