= Kihoku, Ehime =

Kihoku 鬼北町
- Town
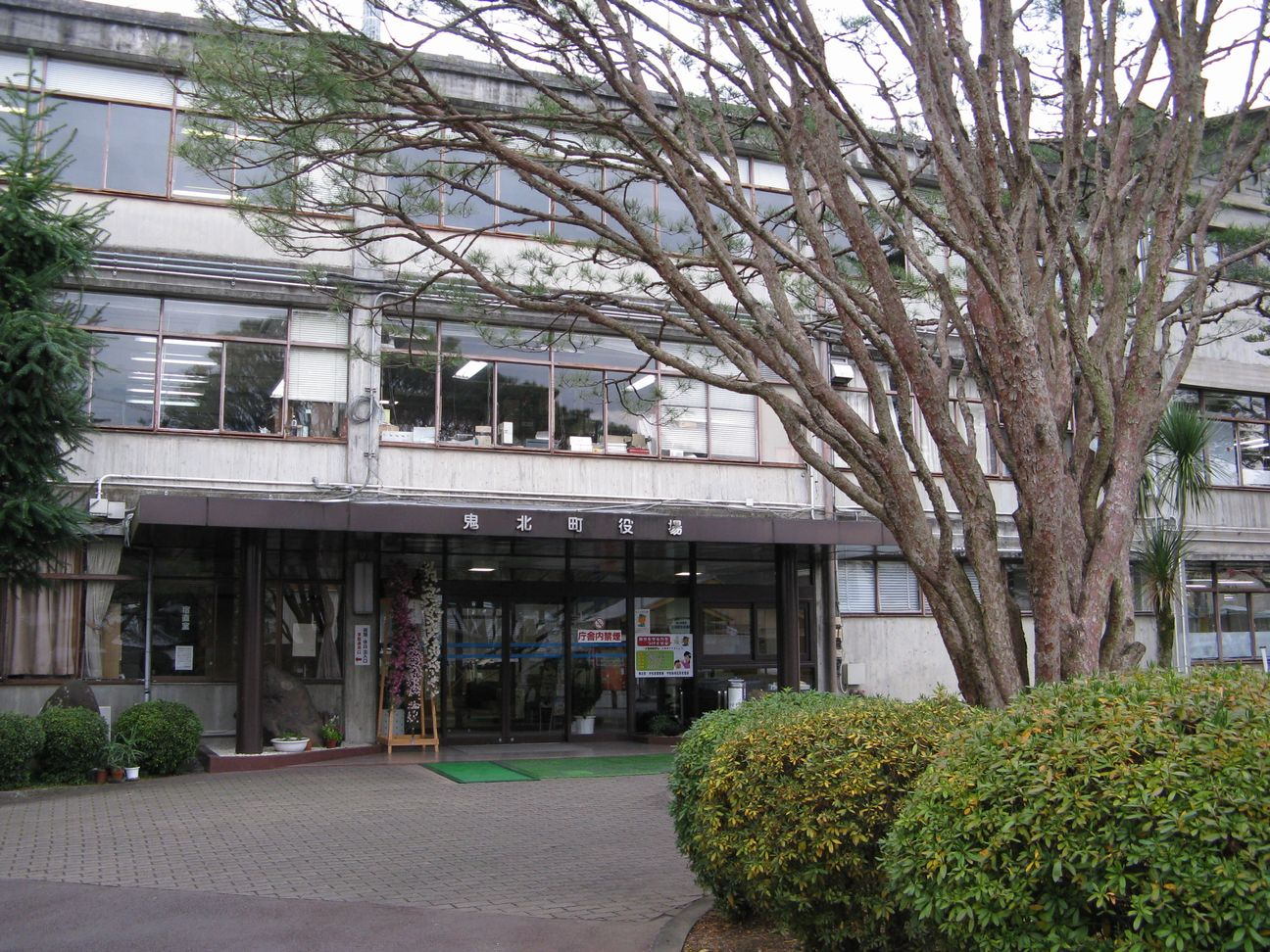
- Kihoku Town Hall

- Flag Emblem
- Interactive map of Kihoku
- Location in Japan
- Coordinates: 33°15′N 132°41′E
- Country: Japan
- Region: Shikoku
- Prefecture: Ehime
- District: Kitauwa

Government
  - Mayor: Seiki Hyōdō

Area
  - Total: 241.88 km^{2} (93.39 sq mi)

Population (August 31, 2022)
  - Total: 9,614
  - Density: 39.75/km^{2} (102.9/sq mi)
- Time zone: UTC+09:00 (JST)
- City hall address: 800-1 Ōaza Chikanaga, Kihoku-chō, Kitauwa-gun, Ehime-ken 798-1395
- Website: Official website
- Symbols
- Flower: Azalea (躑躅, Tsutsuji)
- Tree: Hinoki cypress (桧, Hinoki)

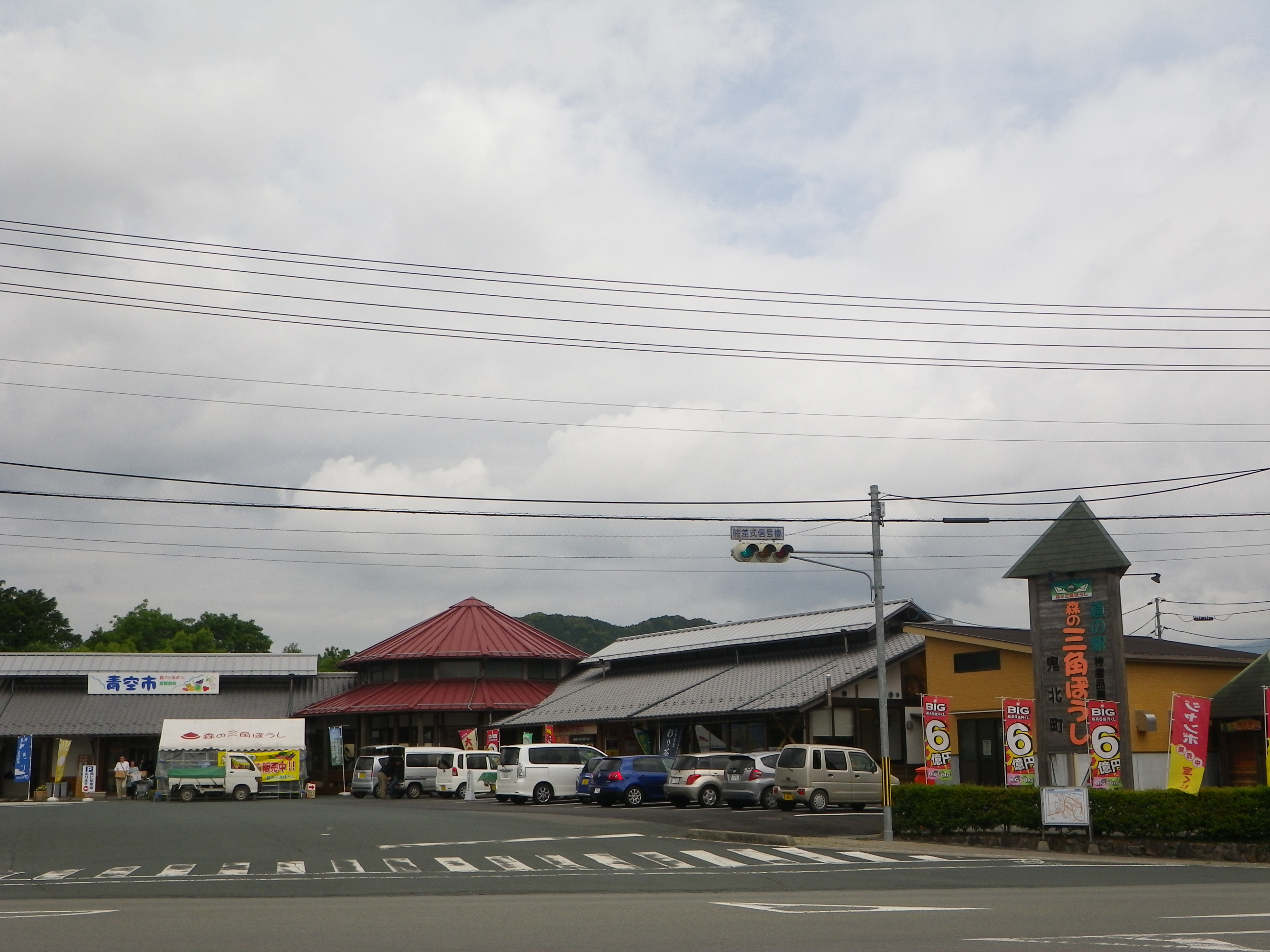
Roadside Station Morino Sankakuboushi

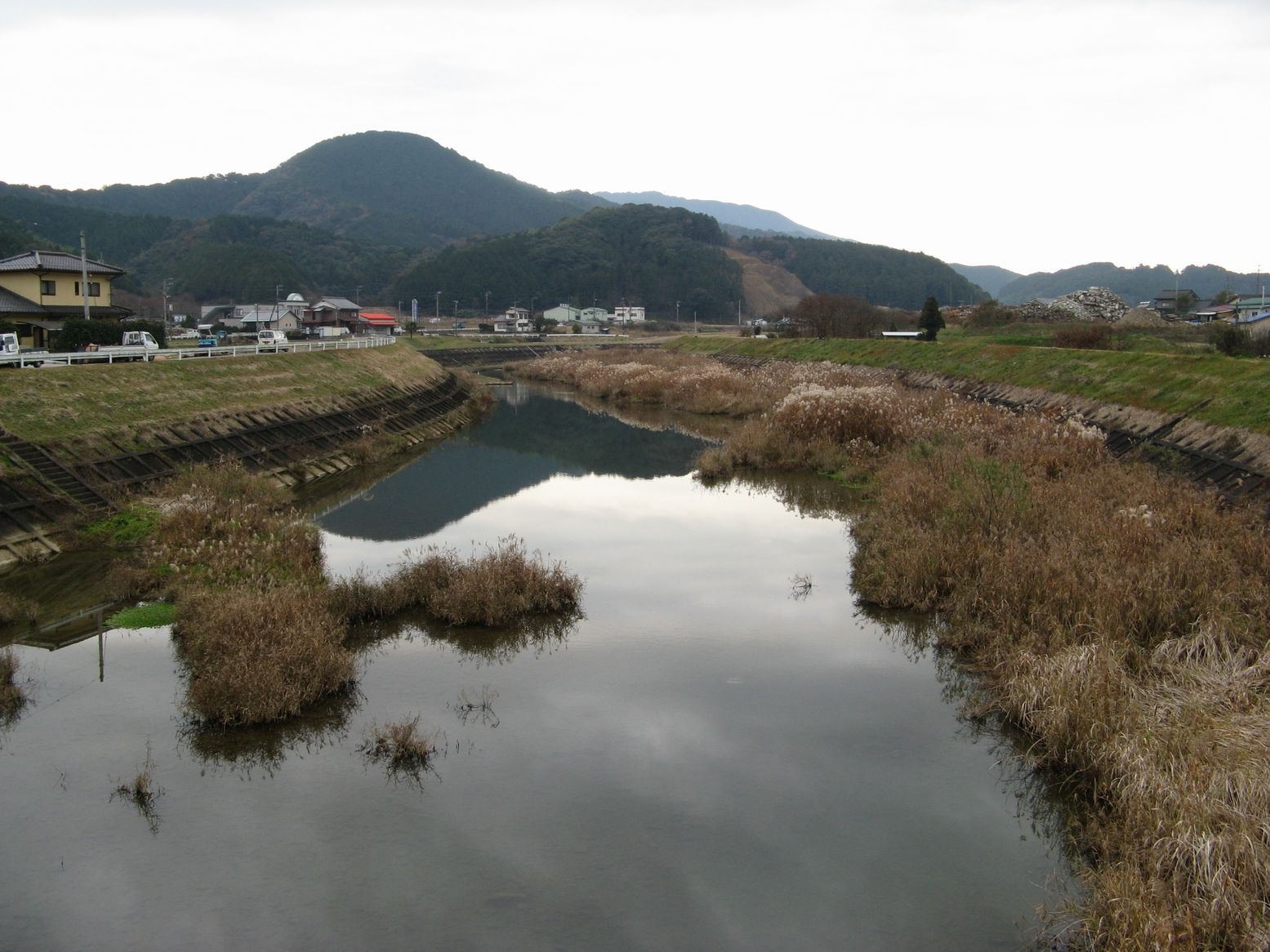
Mimagawa River

Kihoku (鬼北町, Kihoku-chō) is a town located in Kitauwa District, Ehime Prefecture, Japan. As of 31 August 2022, the town had an estimated population of 9,614 in 4891 households, and a population density of 40 persons per km^{2}. The total area of the town is 241.88 square kilometres (93.39 sq mi).The name of the town is derived from the town's location to the north, 北, of Mt. Onigajō "鬼が城."

== Geography ==
Kihoku is located in the Onigajō mountain range in southwestern Ehime Prefecture on the island of Shikoku. The town is composed of several villages merged into one town area. As such, it is spread out over a broad series of small valleys in the town proper. The largest town area, Hiromi, is located in a larger valley in the southwest section of the town. Other areas include Aiji in the north, Mishima centrally, and Hiyoshi in the east.

=== Climate ===
Kihoku has a humid subtropical climate (Köppen Cfa) characterized by warm summers and cool winters with light snowfall. The average annual temperature in Kihoku is 14.5 °C. The average annual rainfall is 2010 mm with June as the wettest month. The temperatures are highest on average in August, at around 25.3 °C, and lowest in January, at around 3.5 °C. Because of the higher elevation and surrounding mountains, Kihoku is generally cooler than Uwajima and Matsuyama, though at times it can be warmer. The area of Hiyoshi is higher in the mountains than Hiromi, and thus cooler. Snow falls occasionally in the winter, but rarely lasts in the town for more than a few days. Summers are hot and humid, with the rainy season lasting from mid-June to mid-July.

=== Nearby cities and towns ===
Ehime Prefecture

- Matsuno to the south
- Seiyo to the north
- Uwajima to the east

Kōchi Prefecture

- Shimanto town to the south
- Yusuhara to the west

=== Mountains ===
- Mt. Izumigamori 755 m
- Mt. Gozaisho 908 m
- Mt. Kakkōdake 1,010 m
- Mt. Takatsuki 1,228 m
- Mt. Tokigozen 946 m

=== Rivers ===
There are numerous rivers running through the area, the largest of which is the Hiromi River, which is a tributary of the Shimanto River, in Kōchi Prefecture.

== Demographics ==
Per Japanese census data, the population of Kihoku has decreased steadily since the 1950s.

Historical population
Year	Pop.	±%
1960	22,963	—
1970	16,788	−26.9%
1980	15,602	−7.1%
1990	14,174	−9.2%
2000	13,080	−7.7%
2010	11,633	−11.1%
2020	9,682	−16.8%

== History ==
The area of Kihoku was part of ancient Iyo Province. During the Edo period, the area was part of the holdings of Uwajima Domain ruled by the Date clan from their seat at Uwajima Castle. The villages of Yoshida and Asahi (旭村) were established with the creation of the modern municipalities system on October 1, 1889. Asahi was raised to town status on November 10, 1941, and was renamed Chikanaga (近永町). Chikanaga merged with the neighboring villages of Yoshifuji, Aiji, Izumi and Mishima to form the town of Hiromi (広見町) on March 31, 1955. On January 1, 2005, Hiromi and the village of Hiyoshi (日吉村) merged to form the town of Kihoku.

== Government ==
Kihoku has a mayor-council form of government with a directly elected mayor and a unicameral town council of 12 members. Kihoku, together with Uwajima and Matsuno, contributes four members to the Ehime Prefectural Assembly.

In terms of national politics, Kihoku is part of Ehime 3rd district of the lower house of the Diet of Japan. Prior to 2022, the town was part of Ehime 4th district.

== Economy ==
Forestry and agriculture are the main industries in Kihoku; however, forestry is in decline. Agriculture is dominated by rice cultivation. Additional products include Shiitake mushrooms, chestnuts, yuzu, chickens, bancha tea, wasabi, melons, strawberries, Japanese yams, cucumbers, turmeric, milk, miso, trout, fish products, crabs, wood products and pottery.

Kihoku residents are especially proud of their pheasant meat, which is a town delicacy. In addition to pheasant meat, pheasant sake is also produced. One of the main highlights of the Dechikonka festival is the massive pheasant nabemono, or pheasant stew, which is made for the festival and given away.

== Education ==
Kihoku has six public elementary schools and two public middle schools operated by the town government. The town has two public high schools operated by the Ehime Prefectural Board of Education.

== Transportation ==
=== Railways ===
Shikoku Railway Company - Yodo Line

- Izume - Chikanaga - Fukata

=== Highways ===
- National Route 197
- National Route 320
- National Route 381
- National Route 441

== Local attractions ==
- Jōmon Ruins — The remains of a 3,000-year-old Jōmon Period community are located near the eastern section of the Hiromi River. The ruins are composed of a small formation of stones, which are protected by an enclosure and have been designated as a historical site.
- Former Grounds of Tomyoji Temple — The site of the former grounds of Tomyoji Temple. The temple was first established in 1330 by a monk of the Tendai school of Buddhism as a training ground for monks and priests. It burned down during Toyotomi Hideyoshi's conquest of the area in 1588. Tomyoji Temple was later rebuilt at the foot of the mountain, where it stands today. Stonework and landscaping from the original temple still remain. There is a museum on the former grounds, which discusses the history of the temple and presents artifacts discovered during excavation of the area.
- Morinosankakuboushi — A roadside station in Hiromi with a large statue of an oni, named "Onioumaru (鬼王丸)". The shops sell seasonal produce as well as local specialities and products such as miso paste, pheasant, and boar curry. Hosts farmer's markets and other local events. There is also a restaurant that serves pheasant and other dishes.
- Narukawa Valley — A valley in the southwestern part of the town popular for its beautiful nature. The area offers a multitude of activities, including camping, fishing and hiking. In summer there is a sōmen noodle shop. There is also a hotel that serves pheasant dishes, and an onsen.
- Yasumoridō Sōmennagashi —"Yasumori River Sōmen Restaurant" operates from the middle of July to the end of August each summer. The primary attraction here is the nagashi sōmen restaurant, where clumps of sōmen are sent flowing down a metal trough for customers to pluck out with their chopsticks. The noodles are then dipped in a sauce seasoned with yuzu, green onions, sesame, and other ingredients. Also at the restaurant are the Yasumorishōnyu Cave, a small cave which is very cool even during the hottest time of the year, and a small pond stocked with numerous trout for fishing.
- Yumesanchi — A roadside station in Hiyoshi with a large statue of a demon, named "Yukihime (柚鬼媛)", who is Onioumaru's mother. Sells locally grown rice, vegetables, local souvenirs, and food products. Hosts farmer's markets and other local events. There is also a restaurant and bakery.
- Buzaemon Museum — A museum covering the history of Buzaemon, who led a successful peasant uprising in 1793.

=== Events ===
- Buzaemon Furusato Festival — The largest festival held in Hiyoshi. Takes place in mid-August to commemorate a local revolt in 1793 and its leader, Buzaemon. A costumed procession travels through the town to reenact the revolt, and the festival involves bon odori dancing, taiko drumming, and fireworks.
- Dechikonka — The town's main annual festival. In the town's old dialect it means "Won't you come out?" The festival usually takes place on the second weekend of October, starting off with taiko performances Saturday evening. On Sunday there are various dance and musical performances on a bandstand by local groups, as well as a performance by a nationally known singer or entertainer. As in most Japanese festivals there are also numerous vendors and stalls selling a variety of food and other products. Pheasant hotpot (kijinabe) is made in bulk and handed out for free.
- Kawanobori Ekiden — "River-climbing Relay," an annual event at the beginning of August where teams of runners race up the Hiromi River. Although running in the shallows is permitted, runners must land in the water with every step, making the race very slippery and difficult. There is also a "tetsujin," "iron-man," race for individual participants.

== Notable people from Kihoku ==
- Tadashi Hyōdō, one of the first female pilots in Japan, and the first Japanese woman to attain a pilot's license.
