= Matsuno, Ehime =

Matsuno 松野町
- Town
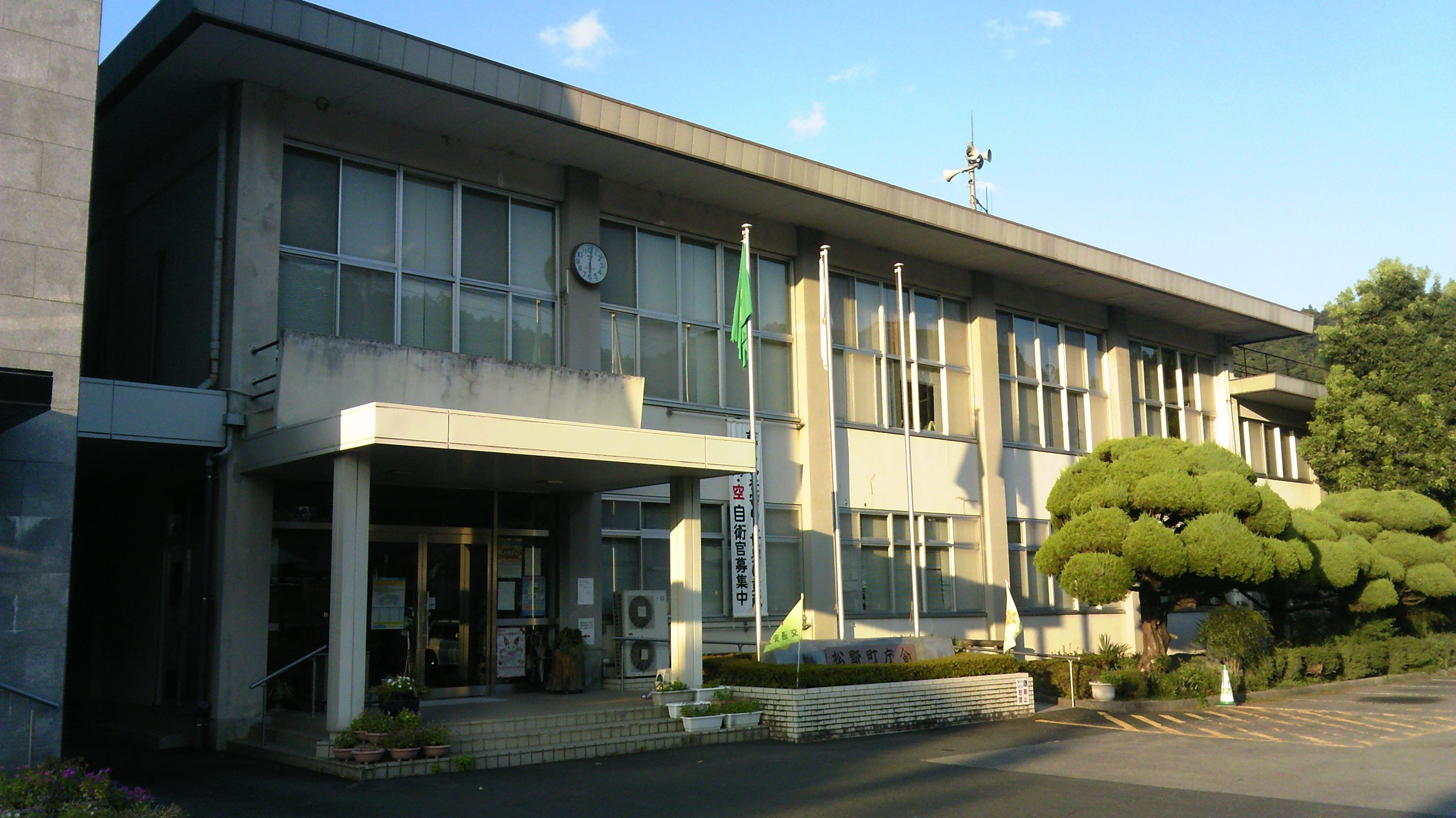
- Matsuno town office

- Flag Chapter
- Interactive map of Matsuno
- Location in Japan
- Coordinates: 33°14′N 132°43′E
- Country: Japan
- Region: Shikoku
- Prefecture: Ehime
- District: Kitauwa

Government
  - Mayor: Hiroshi Sakamoto

Area
  - Total: 98.45 km^{2} (38.01 sq mi)

Population (August 31, 2022)
  - Total: 3,693
  - Density: 37.51/km^{2} (97.15/sq mi)
- Time zone: UTC+09:00 (JST)
- City hall address: 343 Matsumaru, Matsuno-chō, Kitauwa-gun, Ehime-ken 798-2192
- Website: Official website
- Symbols
- Flower: Calanthe orchid (海老根, Ebine)
- Tree: Hinoki cypress (桧, Hinoki)

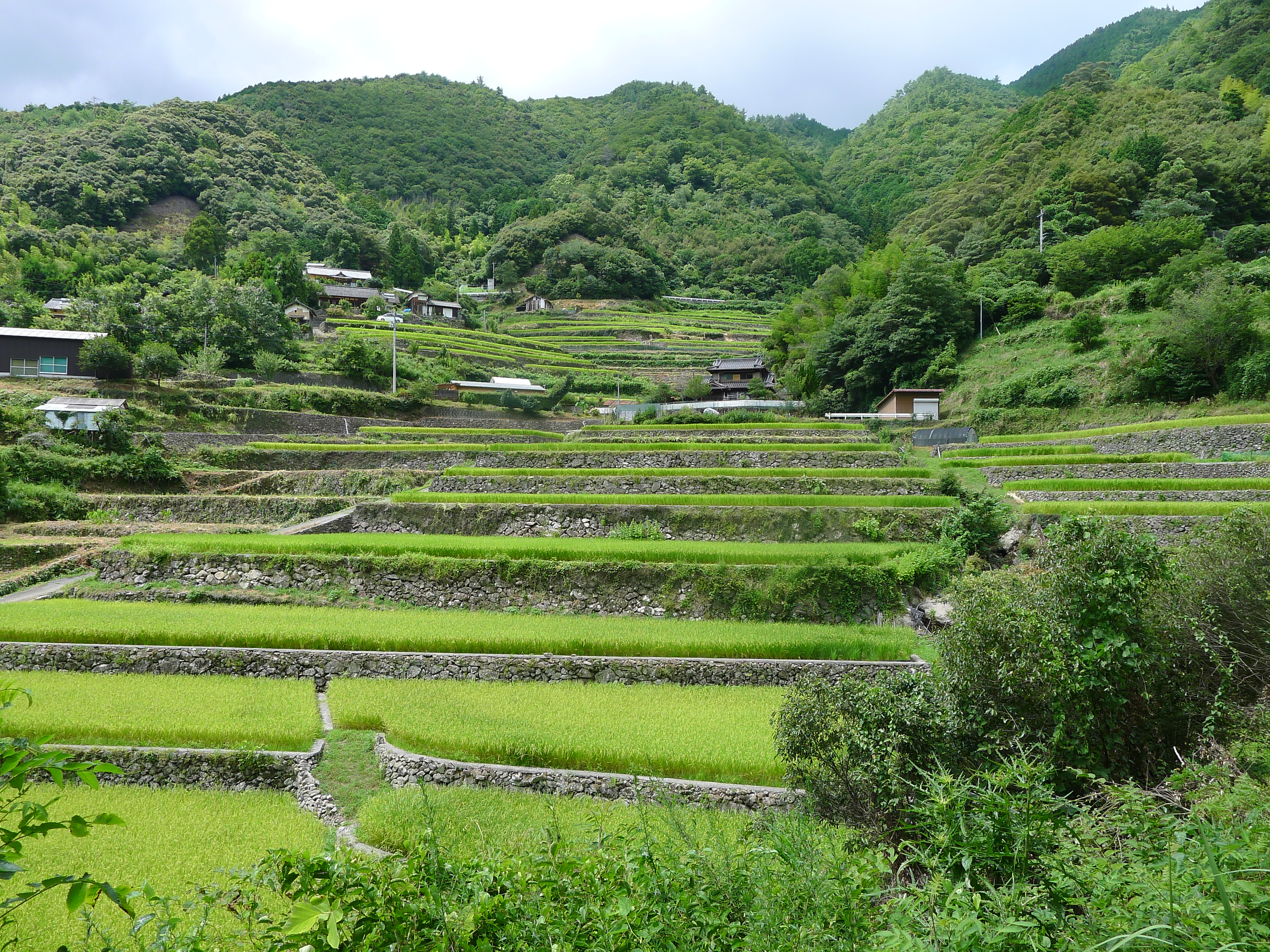
Okuuchi Rice Terraces

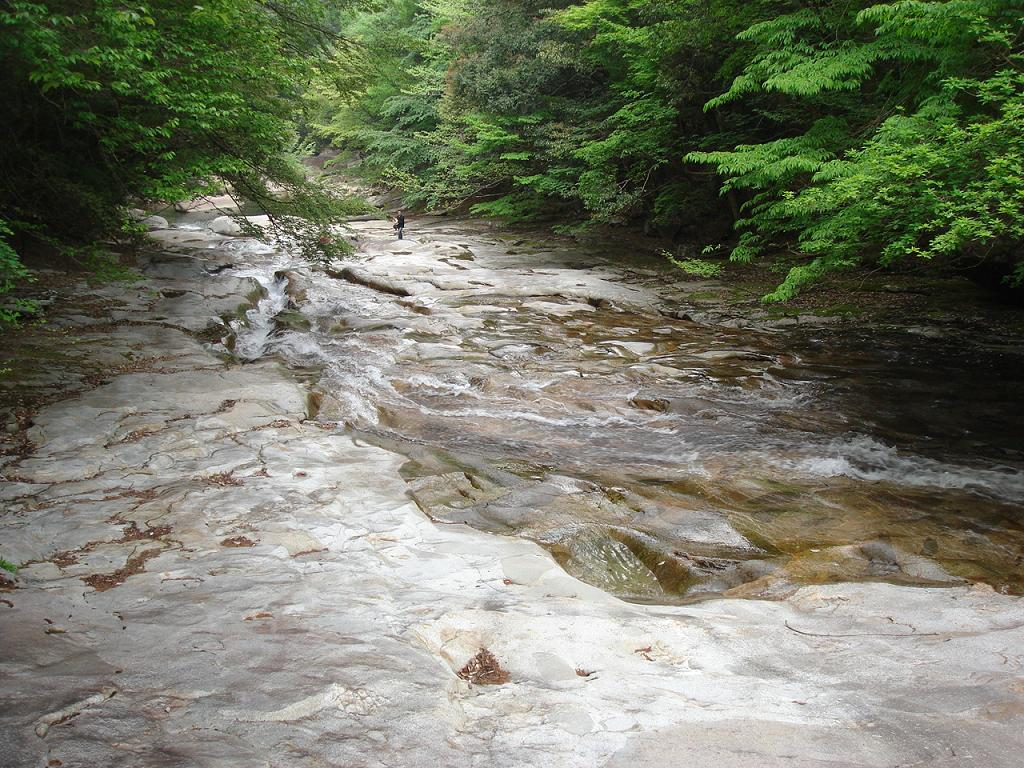
Nametoko Ravine

Matsuno (松野町, Matsuno-chō) is a town located in Kitauwa District, Ehime Prefecture, Japan. As of 1 September 2022, the town had an estimated population of 3,693 in 1978 households, and a population density of 38 persons per km². The total area of the town is 98.45 square kilometres (38.01 sq mi).

== Geography ==
Matsuno is located in mountainous southwestern Ehime Prefecture, on the middle reaches of the Hiromi River, one of the tributaries of the Shimanto River. Forests occupy 84% of the total area. Although located due east of Uwajima across Mount Onigajo, due to lack of roads, it is not possible to go directly to Uwajima from Matsuno without going through Kihoku. A small portion of the town is within the borders of the Ashizuri-Uwakai National Park.

=== Surrounding municipalities ===
Ehime Prefecture

- Kihoku
- Uwajima

Kōchi Prefecture

- Shimanto (city)
- Shimanto (town)

=== Climate ===
Matsuno has a humid subtropical climate (Köppen Cfa) characterized by warm summers and cool winters with light snowfall. The average annual temperature in Matsuno is 14.5 °C. The average annual rainfall is 2010 mm with September as the wettest month. The temperatures are highest on average in January, at around 25.0 °C, and lowest in January, at around 3.9 °C.

== Demographics ==
Per Japanese census data, the population of Matsuno peaked around the year 1950 and has declined by roughly 65 percent in the decades since.

Historical population
Year	Pop.	±%
1920	7,403	—
1930	7,655	+3.4%
1940	7,752	+1.3%
1950	9,857	+27.2%
1960	9,475	−3.9%
1970	6,195	−34.6%
1980	5,912	−4.6%
1990	5,325	−9.9%
2000	4,906	−7.9%
2010	4,377	−10.8%
2020	3,674	−16.1%

== History ==
The area of Matsuno was part of ancient Iyo Province. During the Edo period, the area was part of the holdings of Uwajima Domain ruled by the Date clan from their seat at Uwajima Castle. The villages of Meiji (明治村) and Yoshinobu (吉野生村) within Kitauwa District were established with the creation of the modern municipalities system on October 1, 1889. Meiji was elevated to town status on November 10, 1940 and renamed Matsumaru (松丸町). Matsumaru merged with Yoshinobu on March 31, 1955 to form the town of Matsuno. Proposals to merge with neighboring Kihoku and/or Uwajima were shelved in 2010 after a highly contentious referendum, leaving Matsuno is as the least populous town in Ehime.

== Government ==
Matsuno has a mayor-council form of government with a directly elected mayor and a unicameral town council of seven members. Matsuno, together with Uwajima and Kihoku, contributes four members to the Ehime Prefectural Assembly.

In terms of national politics, Matsuno is part of Ehime 3rd district of the lower house of the Diet of Japan. Prior to 2022, the town was part of Ehime 4th district.

== Economy ==
Matsuno's economy is centered on forestry and to a lesser extent, horticulture. Matsuno is known for its peach production, but not on a large scale. There are many river terraces formed by undulating rivers, and there is little flat land.

== Education ==
Matsuo has two public elementary schools and one public middle school operated by the town government. The town does not have a high school.

== Transportation ==
=== Railways ===
Shikoku Railway Company - Yodo Line

- Matsuchi - Yoshinobu - Matsumaru

=== Highways ===
- National Route 381
- National Route 441

== Local attractions ==
The town is known for its annual half-marathon. The total area is 98.50 km^{2}.
