= Yodo Line =

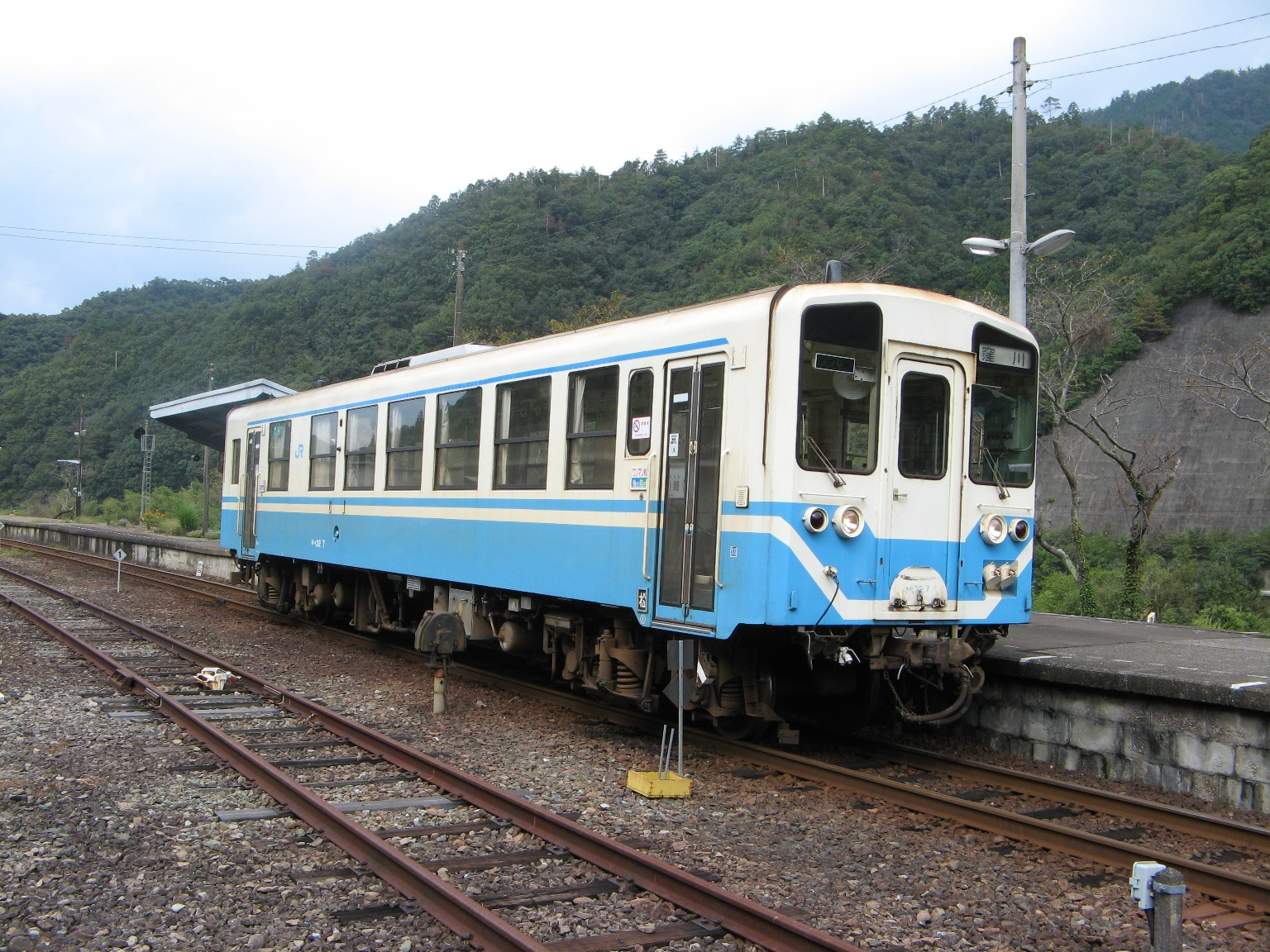
- JR Shikoku KiHa 32 series DMU at Ekawasaki Station

Overview
- Status: In operation
- Owner: JR Shikoku
- Locale: Kōchi, Ehime Prefectures
- Termini: Wakai; Kita-Uwajima
- Stations: 20

Service
- Type: Heavy rail
- Operator(s): JR Shikoku
- Rolling stock: KiHa 32 series, KiHa 31 series, KiHa 185 series DMU

History
- Opened: 1914; 112 years ago

Technical
- Line length: 76.3 km (47.4 mi)
- Number of tracks: Entire line single tracked
- Character: Rural
- Track gauge: 1,067 mm (3 ft 6 in)
- Old gauge: 762 mm (2 ft 6 in)
- Electrification: None
- Operating speed: 85 km/h (53 mph)
Route map

The Yodo Line (予土線, Yodo-sen) is a railway line in Shikoku, Japan, operated by Shikoku Railway Company (JR Shikoku). It connects Kubokawa Station, Shimanto, Takaoka District in Kōchi Prefecture and Uwajima in Ehime Prefecture. Its name comes from the ancient provinces of Iyo (伊予) (now Ehime Prefecture) and Tosa (土佐) (now Kōchi Prefecture), which the line connects.

== Route Description ==
The Yodo line is a quiet, rural single track line with passing places at some stations. The line, which is also known as Shimanto Green Line, is one of the most scenic in Japan running adjacent to the picturesque Shimanto River inland until Ekawasaki. It then winds its way across Ehime Prefecture to Uwajima.

Kubokawa Station on the Dosan Line serves as the departure point for nearly all trains heading west. The first part of the line, to Kawaoku Junction just after Wakai, is not owned by JR but by the Tosa Kuroshio Railway. This section makes up a part of the Tosa Kuroshio Railway Nakamura Line, not a JR line and therefore attracts an additional fare. Passengers, especially those using the Seishun 18 Kippu, are reminded of this by conductor announcements.

After Wakai, the Nakamura Line turns off and the Yodo Line officially begins. The Yodo line ends at a junction with the Yosan Line just before Kita-Uwajima and trains continue on the Yosan Line into Uwajima.

== Services ==
The Yodo Line has only one sort of service, local trains that stop at every station.

In April 2020 there were five trips in each direction between Kubokawa and Uwajima and an additional three trips each way between Uwajima and Ekawasaki & Chikanaga.

Most services are wanman (driver-only) operated.

== Scenic Trains ==
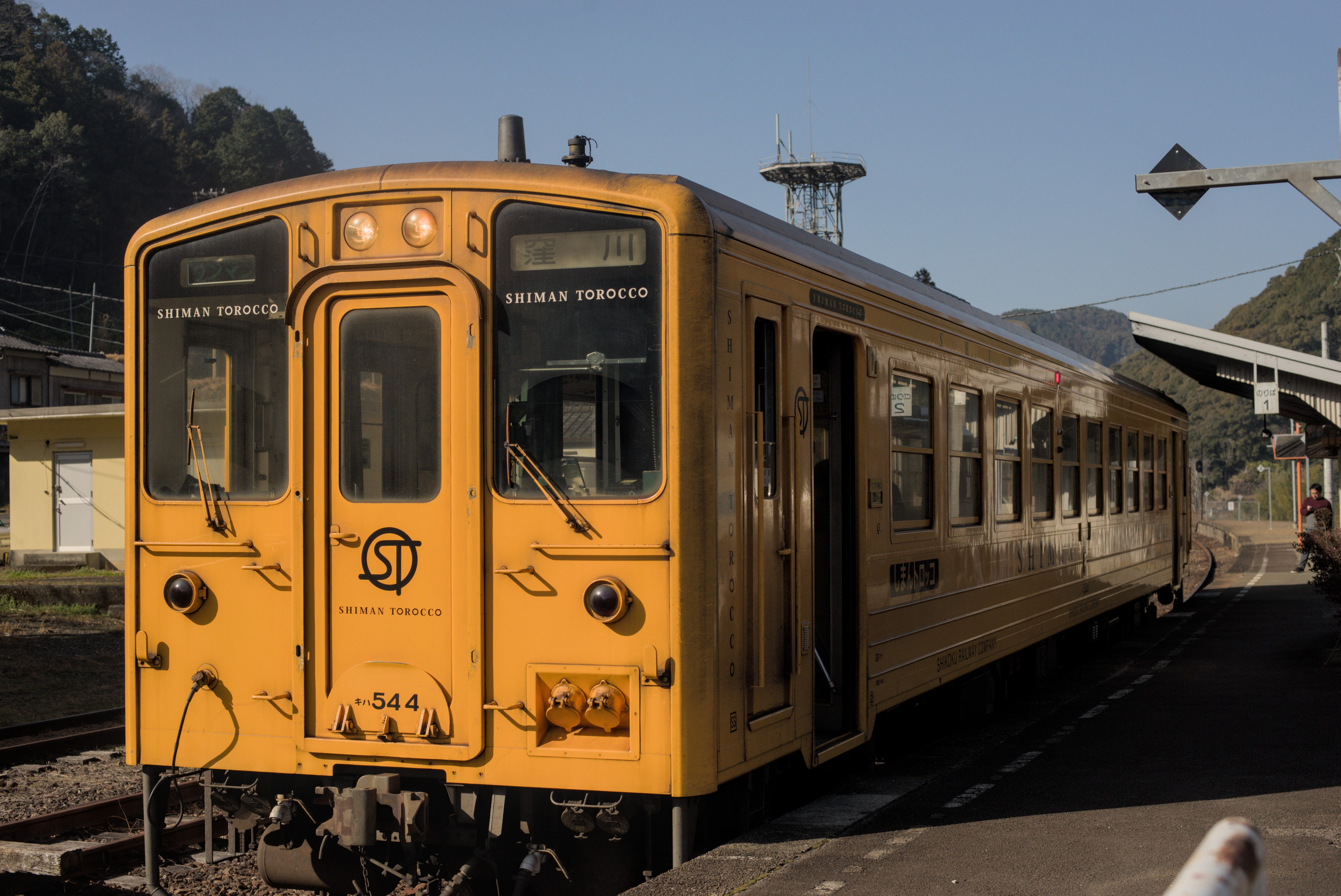
The Shiman Torocco train (without open air car).

There are three tourist trains that run along the Yodo Line:

- Shiman Torocco, designed by Eiji Mitooka, consists of two cars, one of them open air.
- Kaiyodo Hobby Train, created together with the toy figure manufacturing company of the same name.
- Tetsudo Hobby Train, modeled after the first generation shinkansen, and featuring vintage seats from a scrapped 0-series Shinkansen.

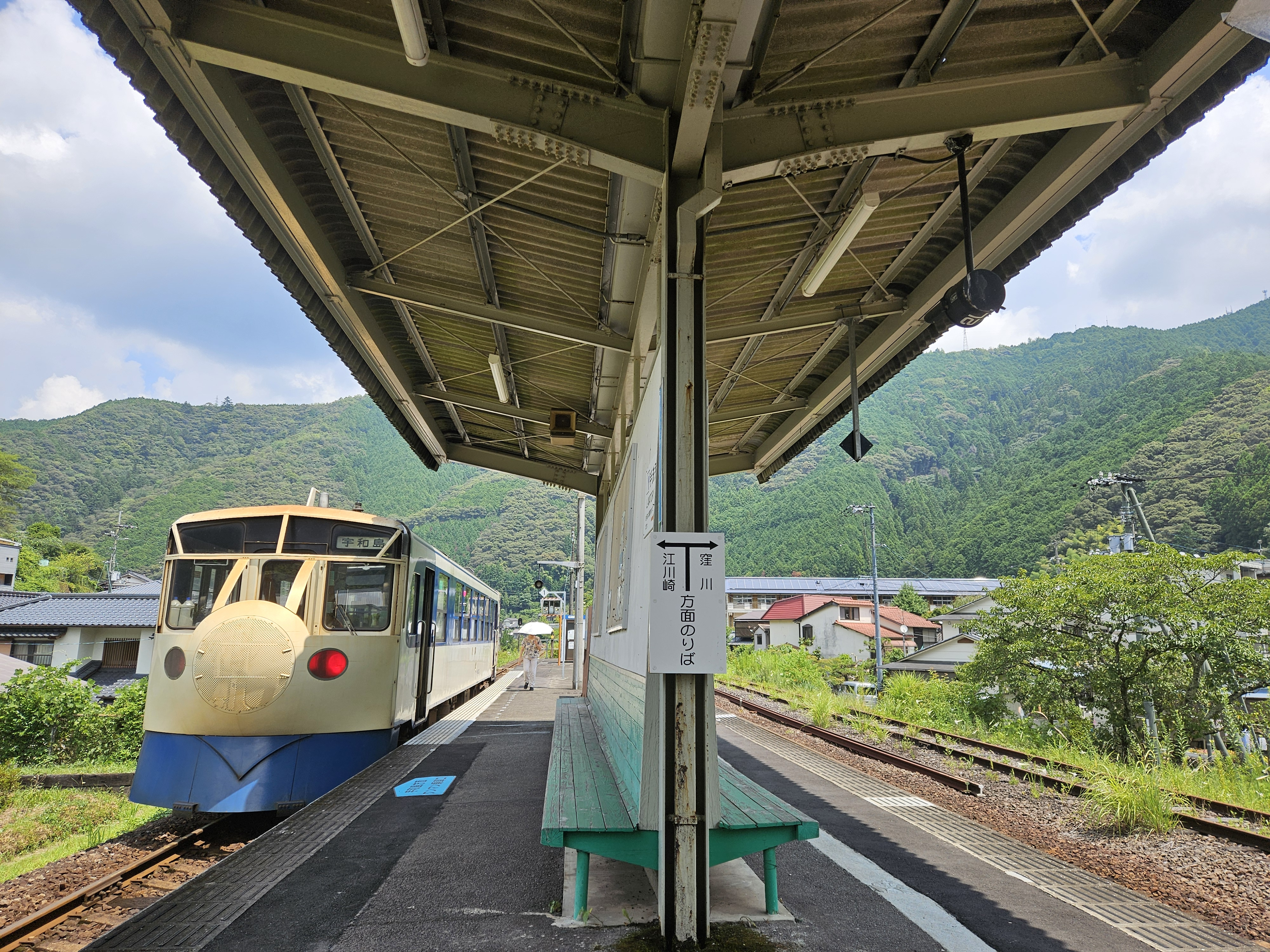
The Tetsudo Hobby Train.

== Stations ==
- All trains run through to Kubokawa on the Dosan Line and Uwajima on the Yosan Line.
- All trains on the Yodo Line are local trains and stop at all stations.
- None of the intermediate stations along the line have a staffed ticket office.
- Trains can pass one another at stations marked "◇" and "^" and cannot pass at those marked "｜".

Station No.	Station	Japanese	Distance (km)		Transfers		Location	
Station No.	Station	Japanese	Between stations	From Wakai	Transfers		Location	
TK26	Kubokawa	窪川	-	4.4	Dosan Line (K26)	◇	Shimanto, Takaoka District	Kōchi
Via the Tosa Kuroshio Railway Nakamura Line
TK27 G27	Wakai	若井	4.4	0.0	Tosa Kuroshio Railway Nakamura Line (TK27) (for Nakamura)	｜	Shimanto, Takaoka District	Kōchi
	Kawaoku Junction	川奥信号場	-	(3.6)	Official branch point for Nakamura Line and Yodo Line	◇	Kuroshio, Hata District	Kōchi
G28	Iejigawa	家地川	5.8	5.8		｜	Shimanto, Takaoka District	Kōchi
G29	Utsuigawa	打井川	4.9	10.7		｜	Shimanto, Takaoka District	Kōchi
G30	Tosa-Taishō	土佐大正	6.9	17.6		◇	Shimanto, Takaoka District	Kōchi
G31	Tosa-Shōwa	土佐昭和	8.9	26.5		｜	Shimanto, Takaoka District	Kōchi
G32	Tōkawa	十川	4.5	31.0		｜	Shimanto, Takaoka District	Kōchi
G33	Hage	半家	7.9	38.9		｜	Shimanto	Kōchi
G34	Ekawasaki	江川崎	3.8	42.7		◇	Shimanto	Kōchi
G35	Nishigahō	西ヶ方	2.7	45.4		｜	Shimanto	Kōchi
G36	Matsuchi	真土	5.9	51.3		｜	Matsuno, Kitauwa District	Ehime
G37	Yoshinobu	吉野生	1.7	53.0		◇	Matsuno, Kitauwa District	Ehime
G38	Matsumaru	松丸	2.3	55.3		｜	Matsuno, Kitauwa District	Ehime
G39	Izume	出目	3.5	58.8		｜	Kihoku, Kitauwa District	Ehime
G40	Chikanaga	近永	1.6	60.4		◇	Kihoku, Kitauwa District	Ehime
G41	Fukata	深田	2.1	62.5		｜	Kihoku, Kitauwa District	Ehime
G42	Ōuchi	大内	2.9	65.4		｜	Uwajima	Ehime
G43	Futana	二名	1.5	66.9		｜	Uwajima	Ehime
G44	Iyo-Miyanoshita	伊予宮野下	2.2	69.1		◇	Uwajima	Ehime
G45	Muden	務田	0.9	70.0		｜	Uwajima	Ehime
G46	Kita-Uwajima	北宇和島	6.3	76.3	Yosan Line (U27) (for Matsuyama)	◇	Uwajima	Ehime
Through to Uwajima via the Yosan Line
G47	Uwajima	宇和島	1.5	77.8		^	Uwajima	Ehime

== History ==
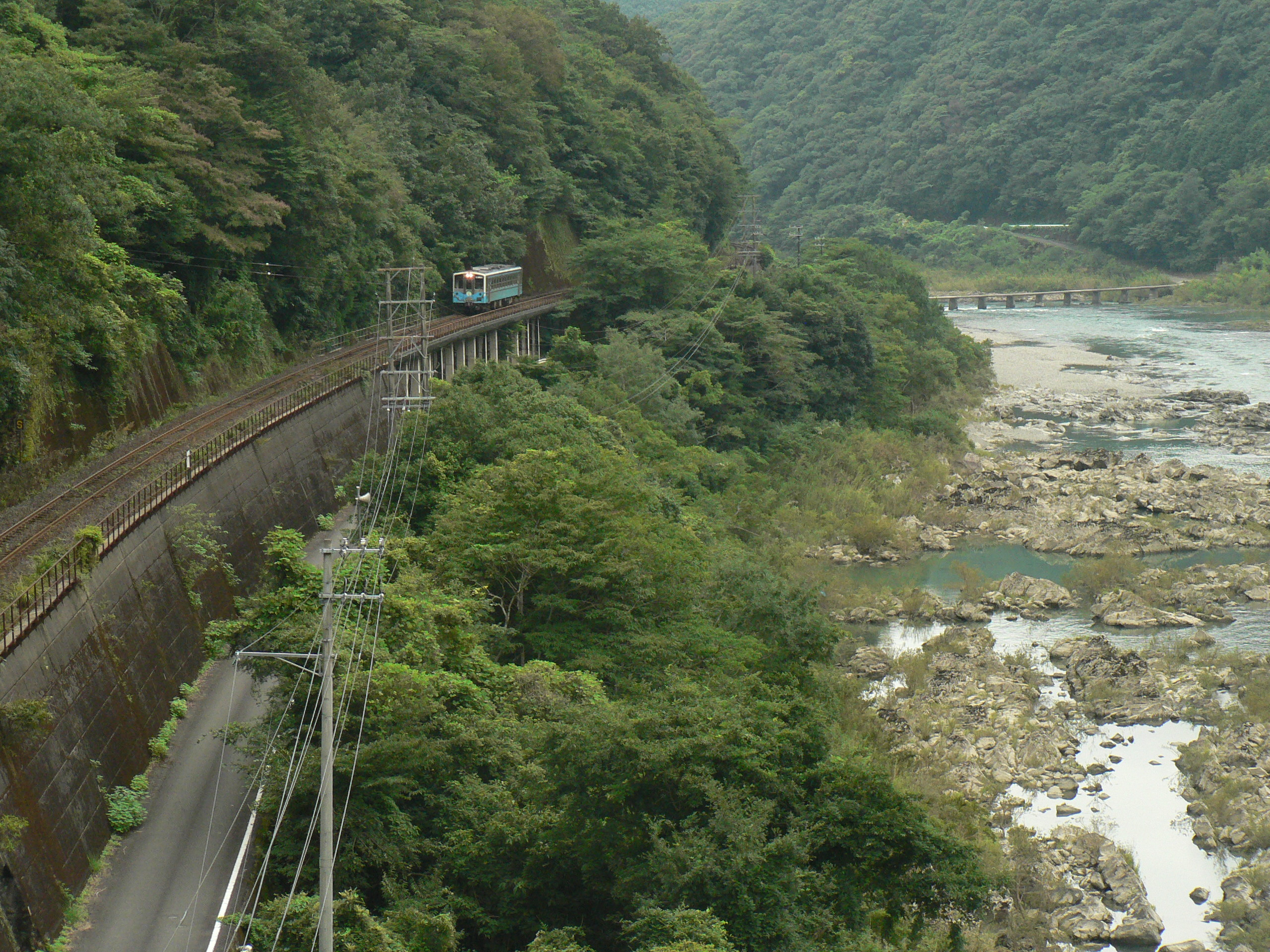
Trains follow the Shimanto River between Kubokawa and Ekawasaki

In 1914, the Uji Light Railway Co. opened a 762 mm (2 ft 6 in) gauge line 18 km between Uwajima and Chikanaga. In 1923, the line was extended 7 km from Chikanaga to Yoshino. In 1931 the Uwajima Railway began operating a single gasoline-powered locomotive.

The Uwajima Railway was nationalised by Japanese Government Railways in 1933, becoming the Uwajima Line; Miyanoshita Station was renamed Iyo-Miyanoshita Station, Nakano became Futana, and Yoshino was renamed Yoshinobu.

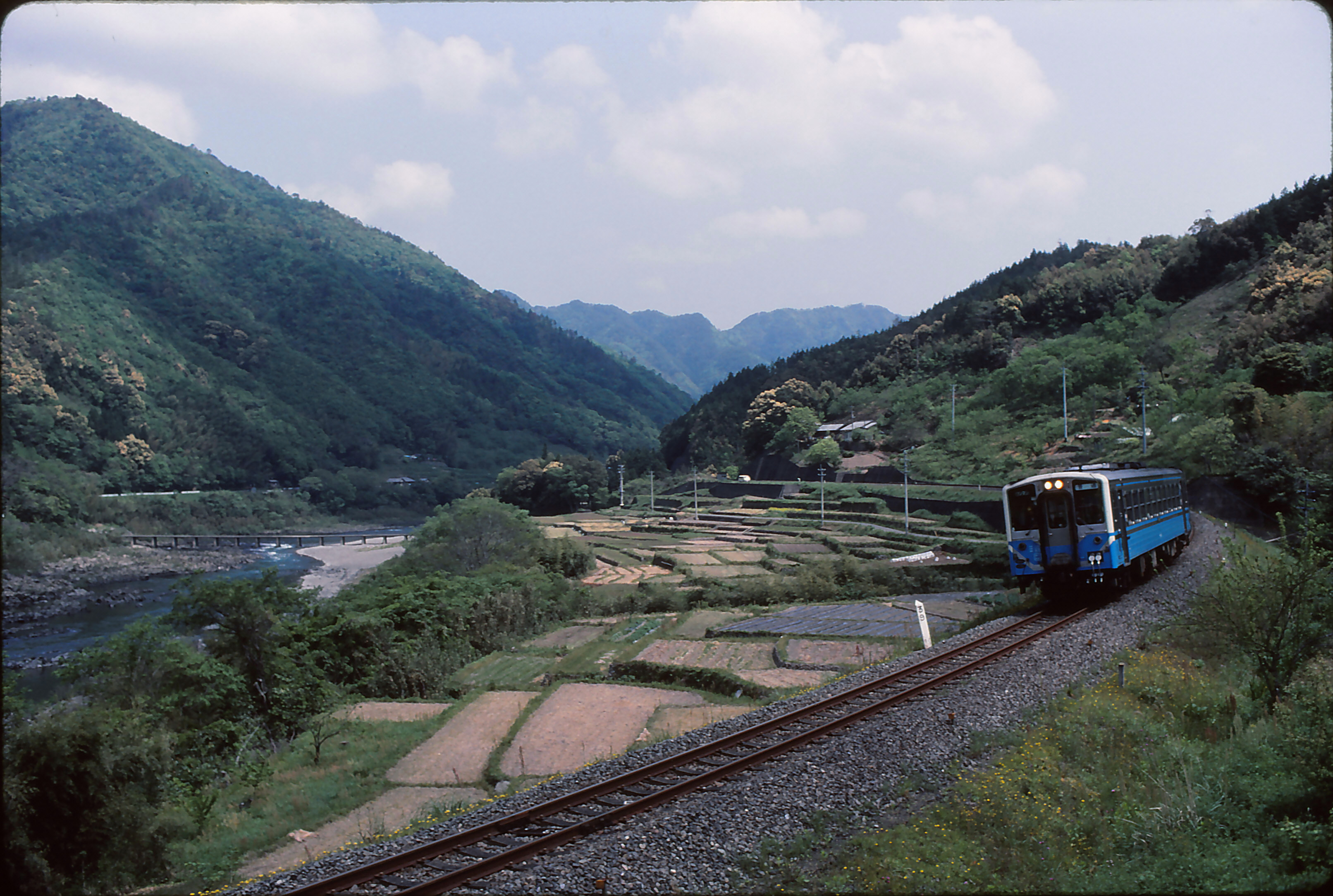
Yodo Line between Tōkawa and Hage Stations

In 1941, the line was re-gauged to 1,067 mm (3 ft 6 in), the section between Uwajima and Muden replaced by a new route, Kita-Uwajima became the line's starting point and Takagushi and Mitsuma stations on the old section were closed.

The 10 km Yoshinobu - Ekawasaki section opened in 1953, and the 43 km Ekawasaki - Wakai section opened in 1974, linking to the Dosan Line with the line renamed as the Yodo Line. In the same year, CTC signalling was commissioned, and freight operations ceased.

== Gallery ==
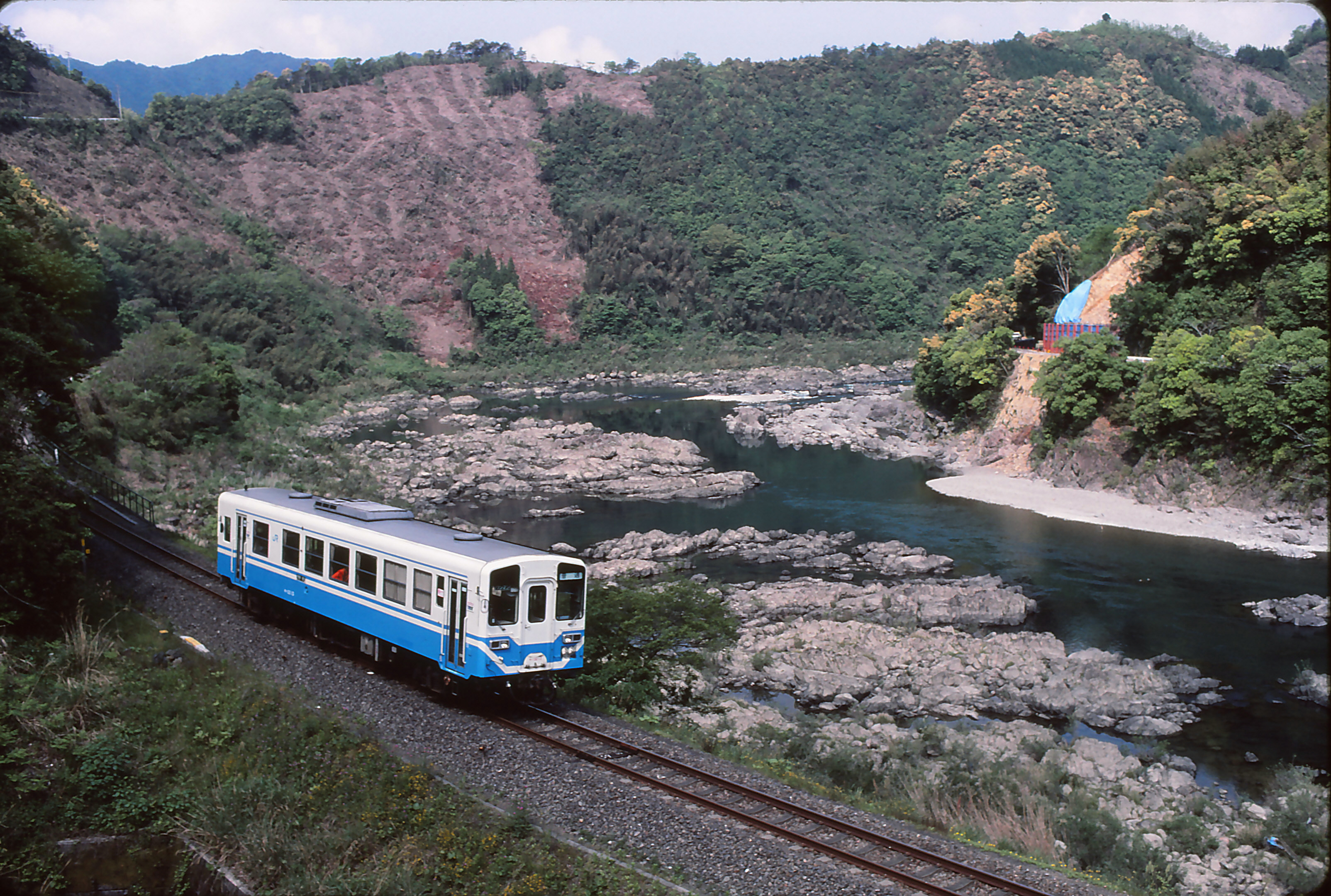

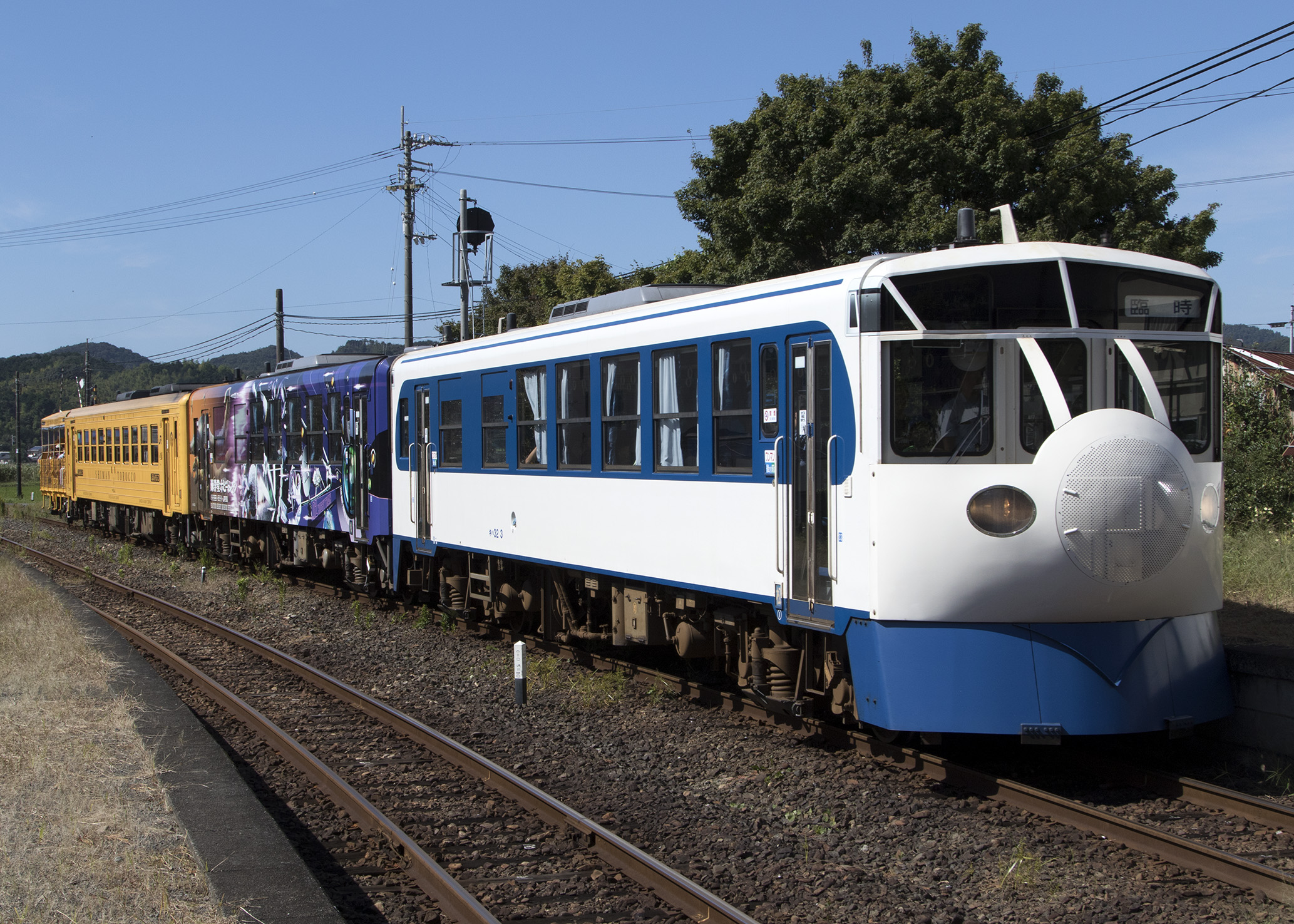

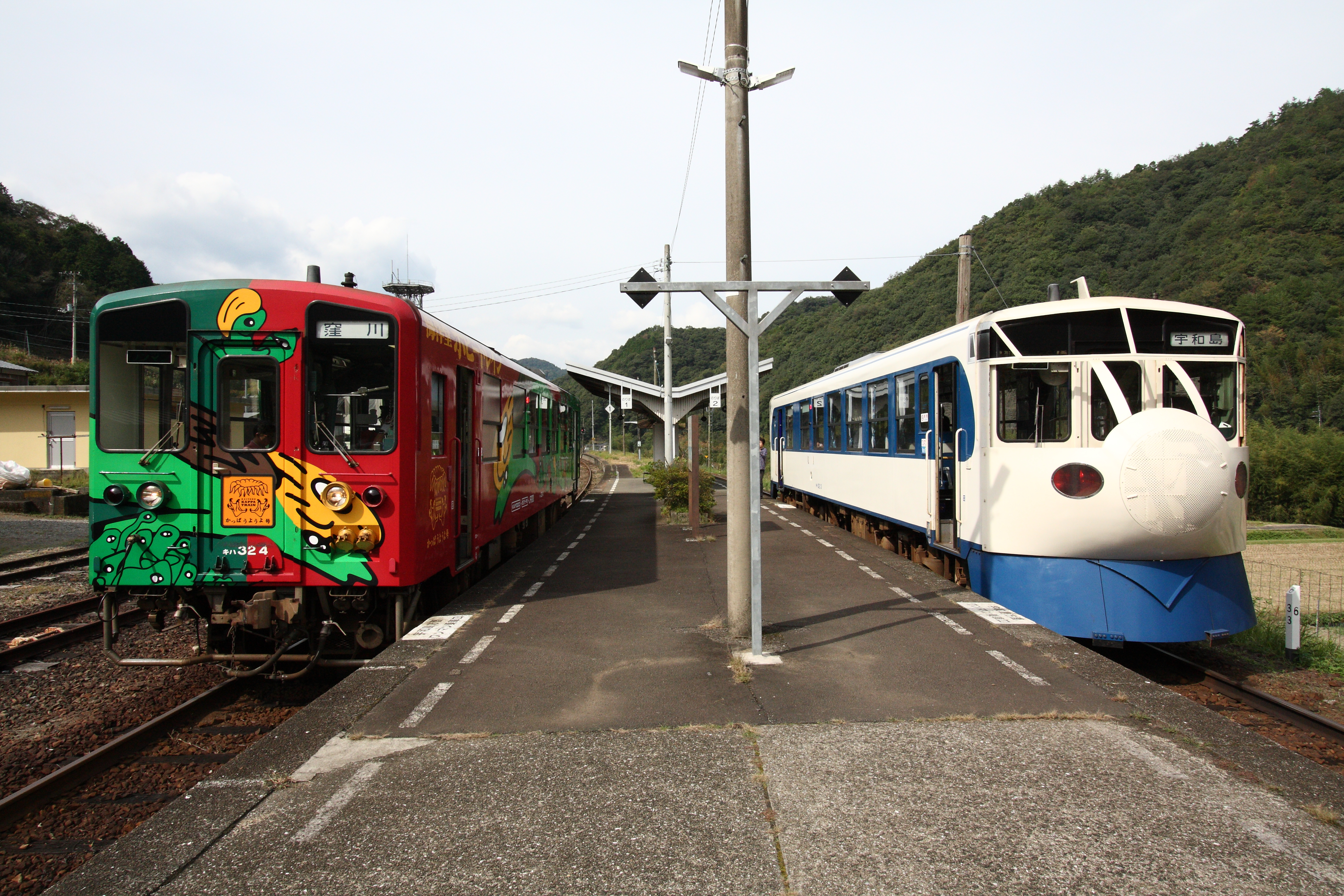

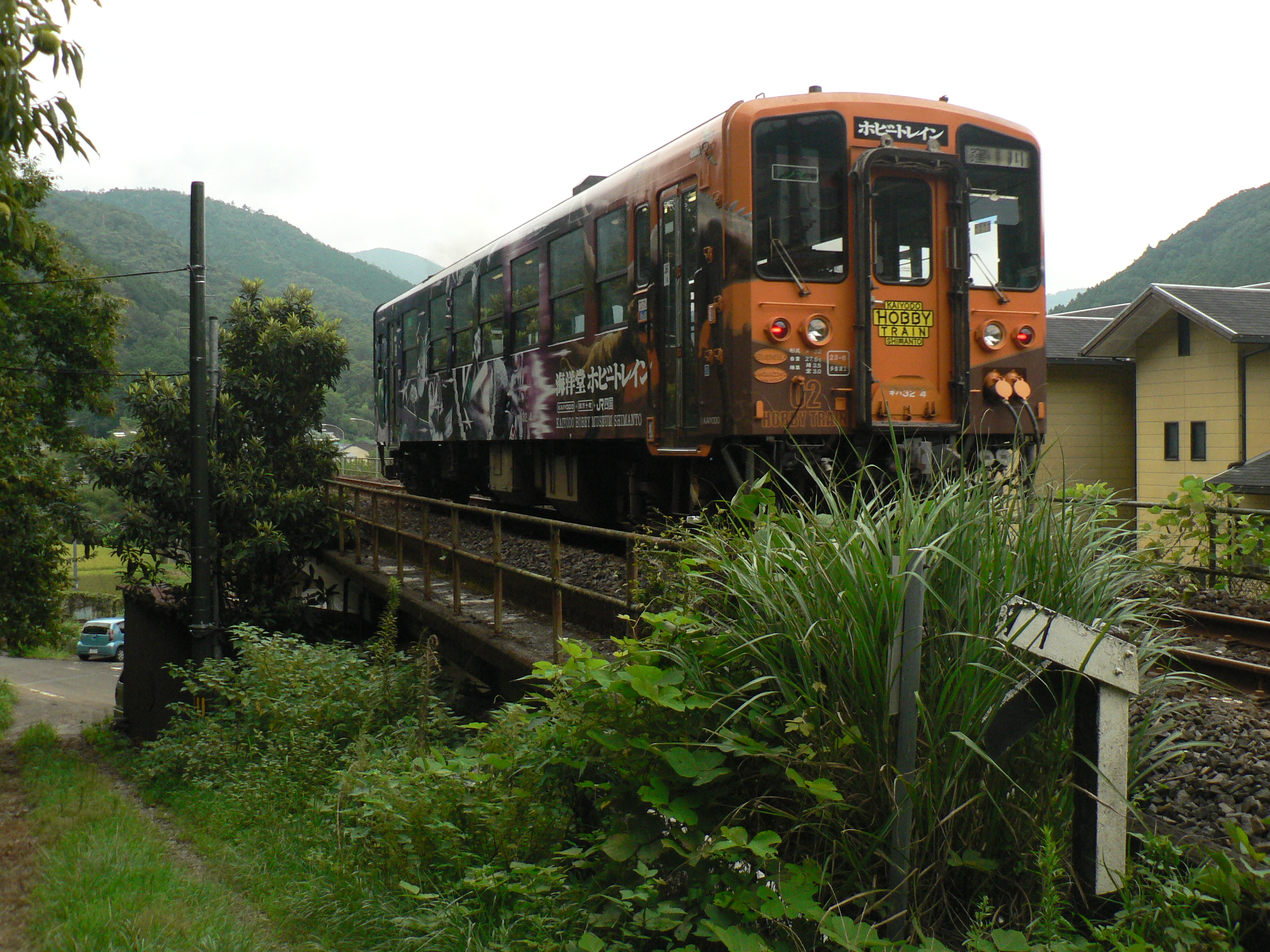

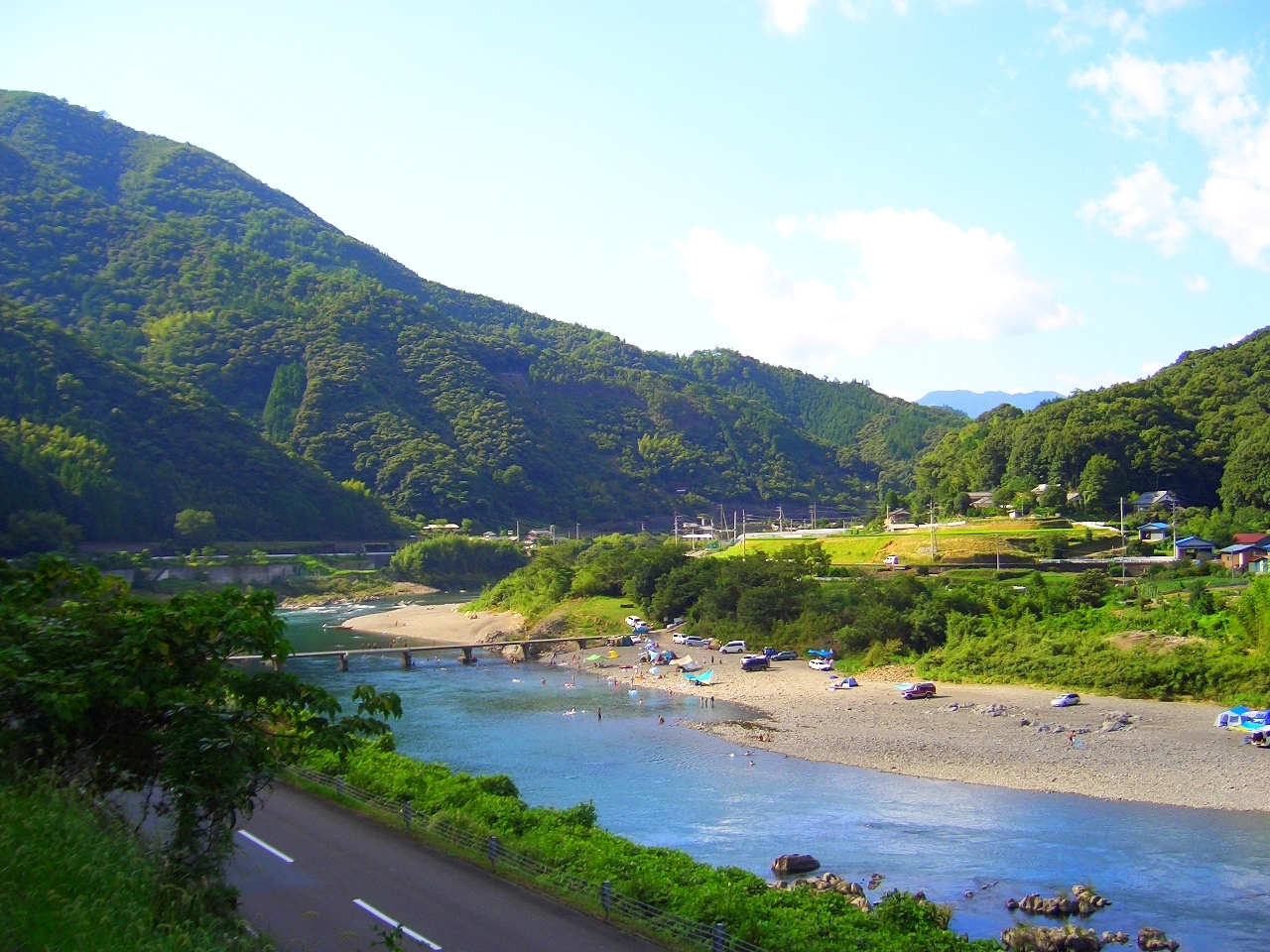

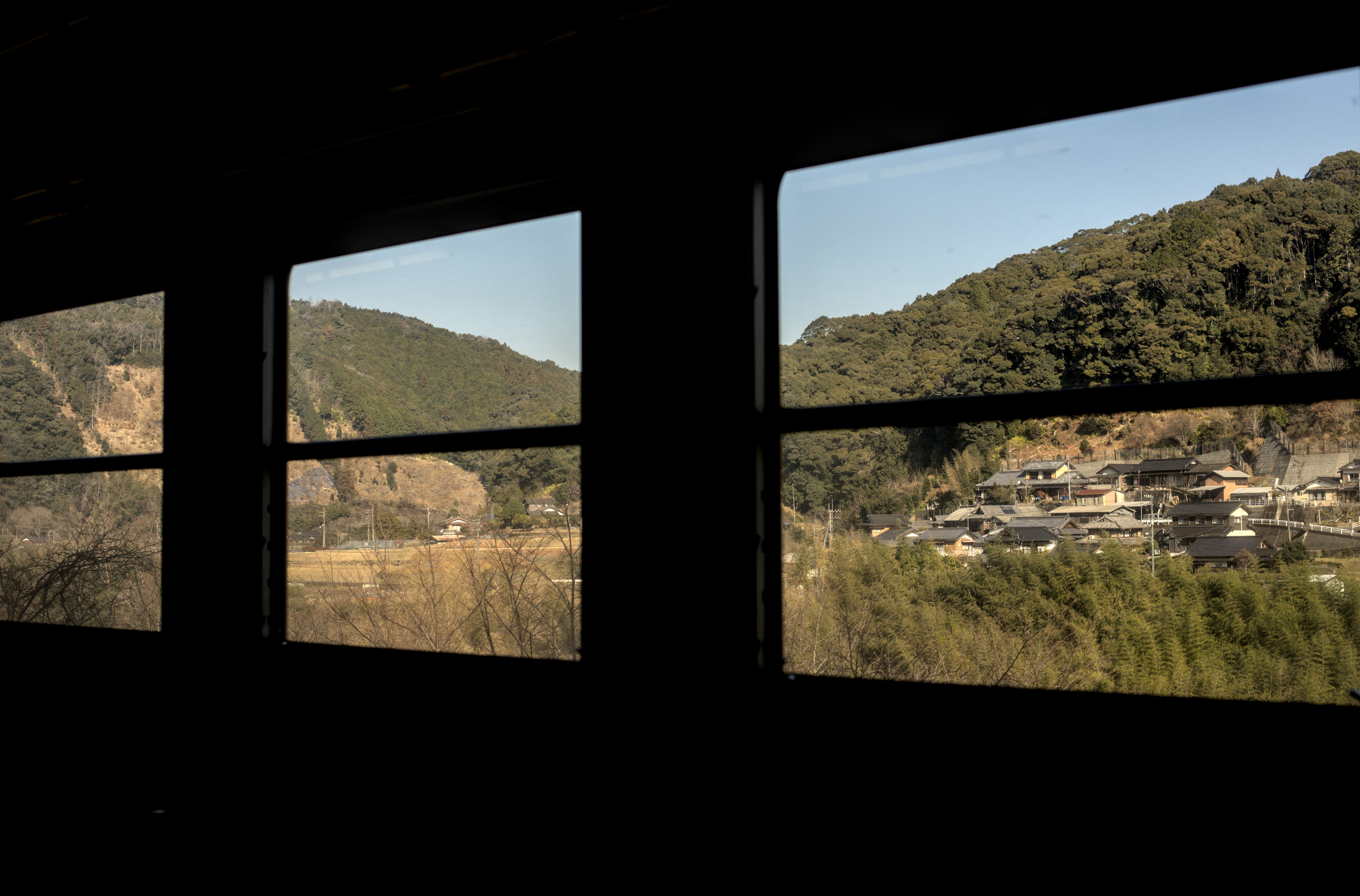
Winter view on the Yodo Line 2026
