= Chikanaga Station =

Railway station in Kihoku, Ehime Prefecture, Japan

G40 Chikanaga Station 近永駅
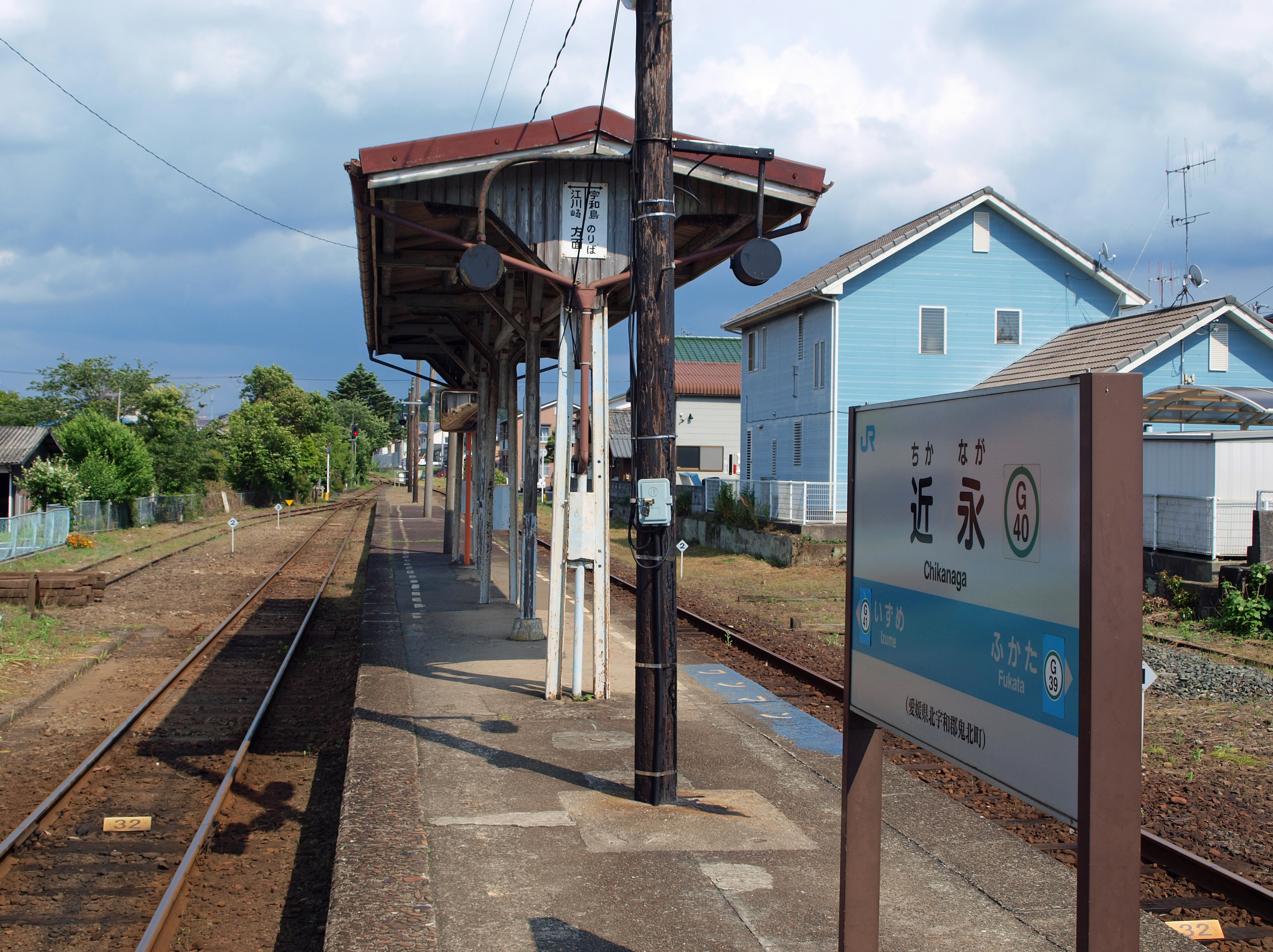
- Platform of Chikanaga Station in 2010

General information
- Location: Chikanaga, Kihoku-chō, Kitauwa-gun, Ehime-ken 798-2101; Japan
- Coordinates: 33°15′20″N 132°40′33″E
- Operator: JR Shikoku
- Line: ■ Yodo Line
- Distance: 60.4 km from Wakai
- Platforms: 1 island platform
- Tracks: 2

Construction
- Parking: Available
- Cycle facilities: Bike shed
- Accessible: No - steps needed to reach platform

Other information
- Status: Kan'i itaku station
- Station code: G40

History
- Opened: 18 October 1914
Location
- Location within Japan

Chikanaga Station (近永駅, Chikanaga-eki) is a railway station on the Yodo Line in Kihoku, Kitauwa District, Ehime Prefecture, Japan. It is operated by JR Shikoku and has the station number "G40".

== Lines ==
The station is served by JR Shikoku's Yodo Line and is located 60.4 km from Wakai.

== Layout ==
The station consists of an island platform served by two tracks. By the side of one track, a station building is located with a waiting and ticket window operated by a kan'i itaku contractor. The island platform is reached by crossing one track along a paved walkway and then climbing up some steps. Parking lots, a bike shed and a public telephone call box are located outside the building.

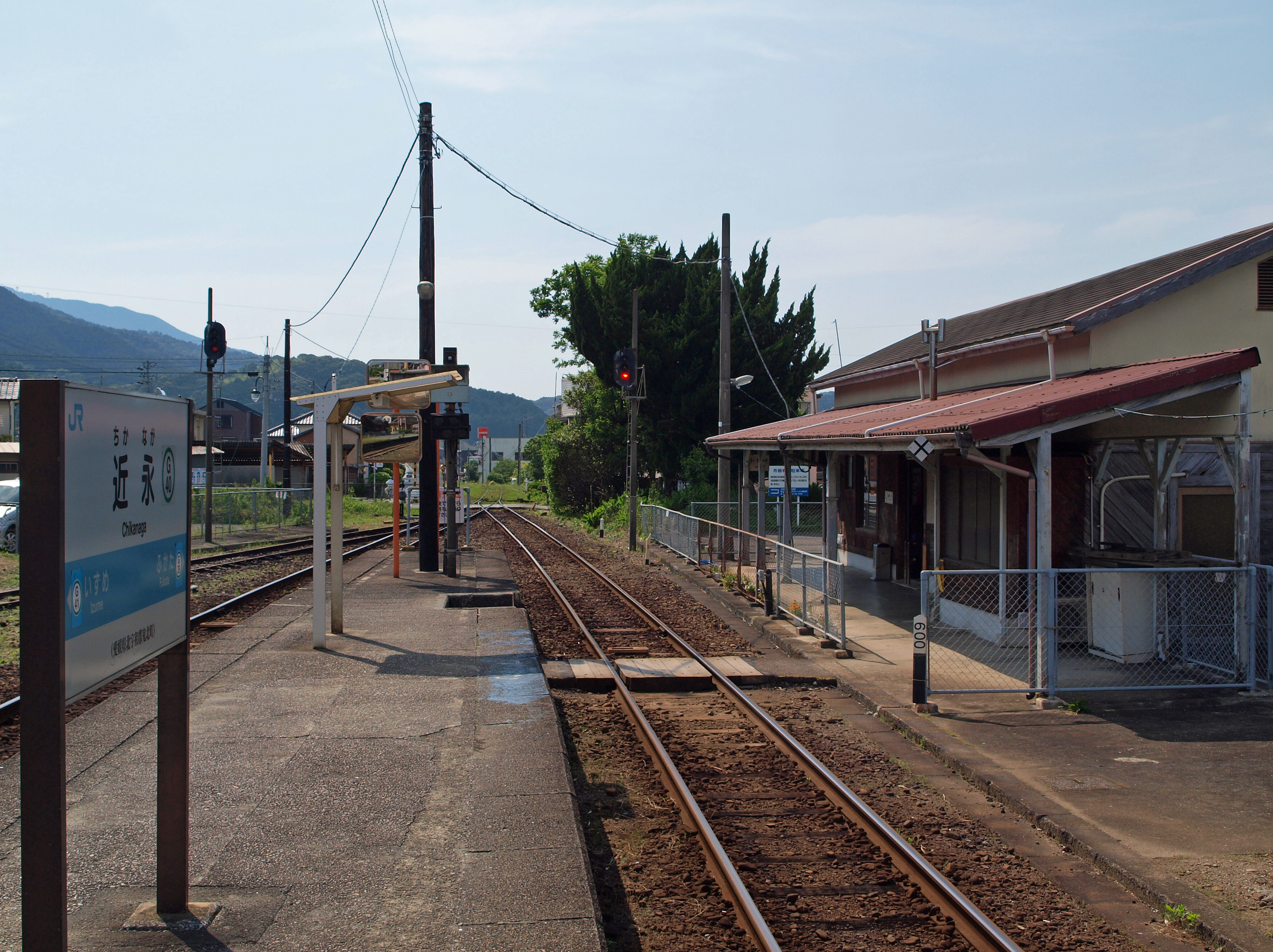
View of station looking in the direction of Fukata. In the centre can be seen the path used to cross the track to access the platform from the station building.

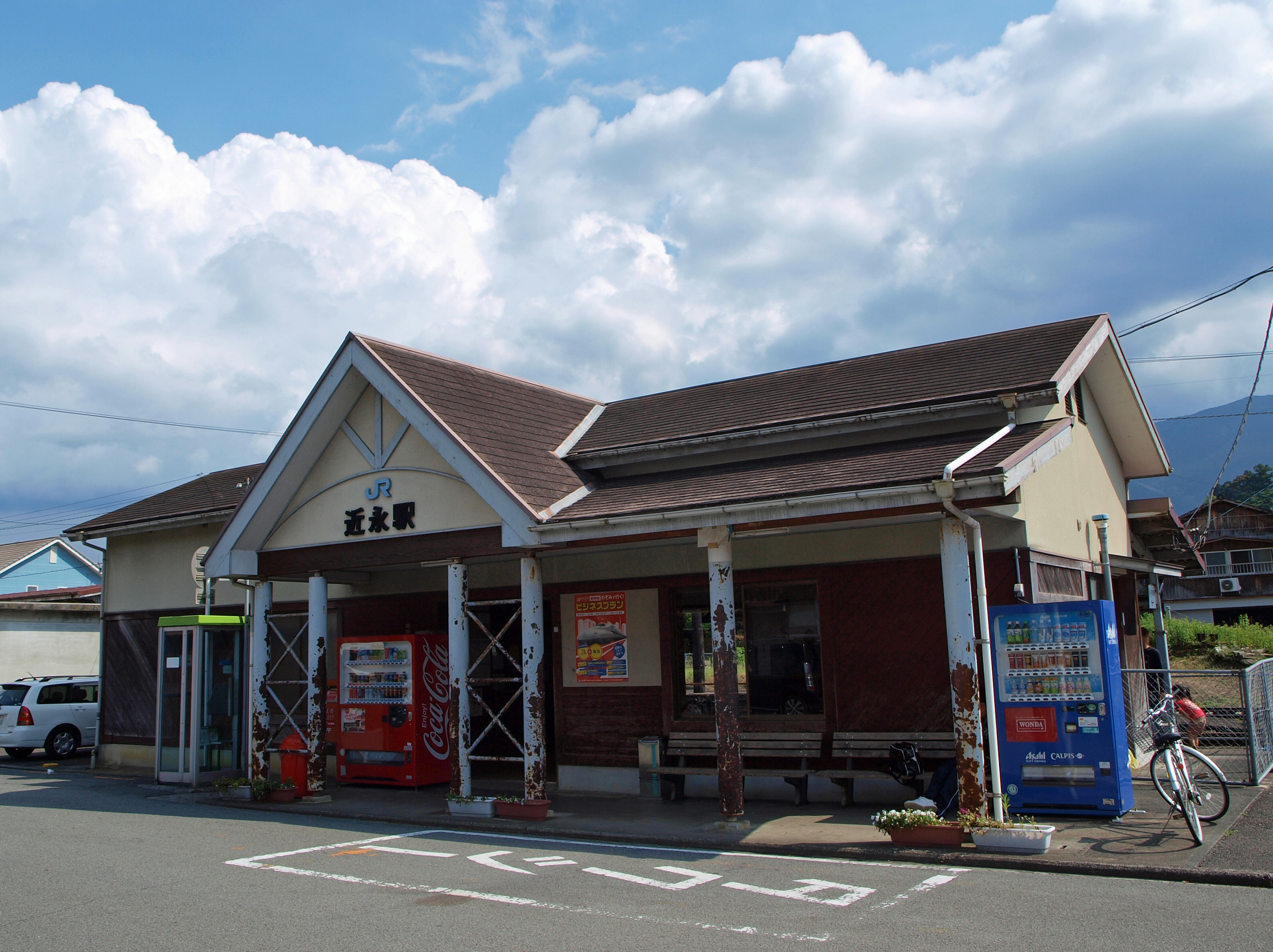
View of the station building facade

== Adjacent stations ==
«	Service	»
Yodo Line
Izume	-	Fukata

== History ==
The station opened on 18 October 1914 as the terminus of a narrow-gauge line from Uwajima owned by the Uwajima Railway (宇和島鉄道). It became a through-station on 12 December 1923 when the line was extended to Yoshino (later renamed Yoshinobu). With the nationalization of the Uwajima Railway on 1 August 1933, the station came under the control of Japanese Government Railways (JGR), later becoming Japanese National Railways (JNR). Subsequently, with the privatization of JNR on 1 April 1987, control passed to JR Shikoku.

== See also ==
- List of railway stations in Japan
