= Wakai Station =

Railway station in Shimanto, Kōchi Prefecture, Japan

G27 Wakai Station 若井駅
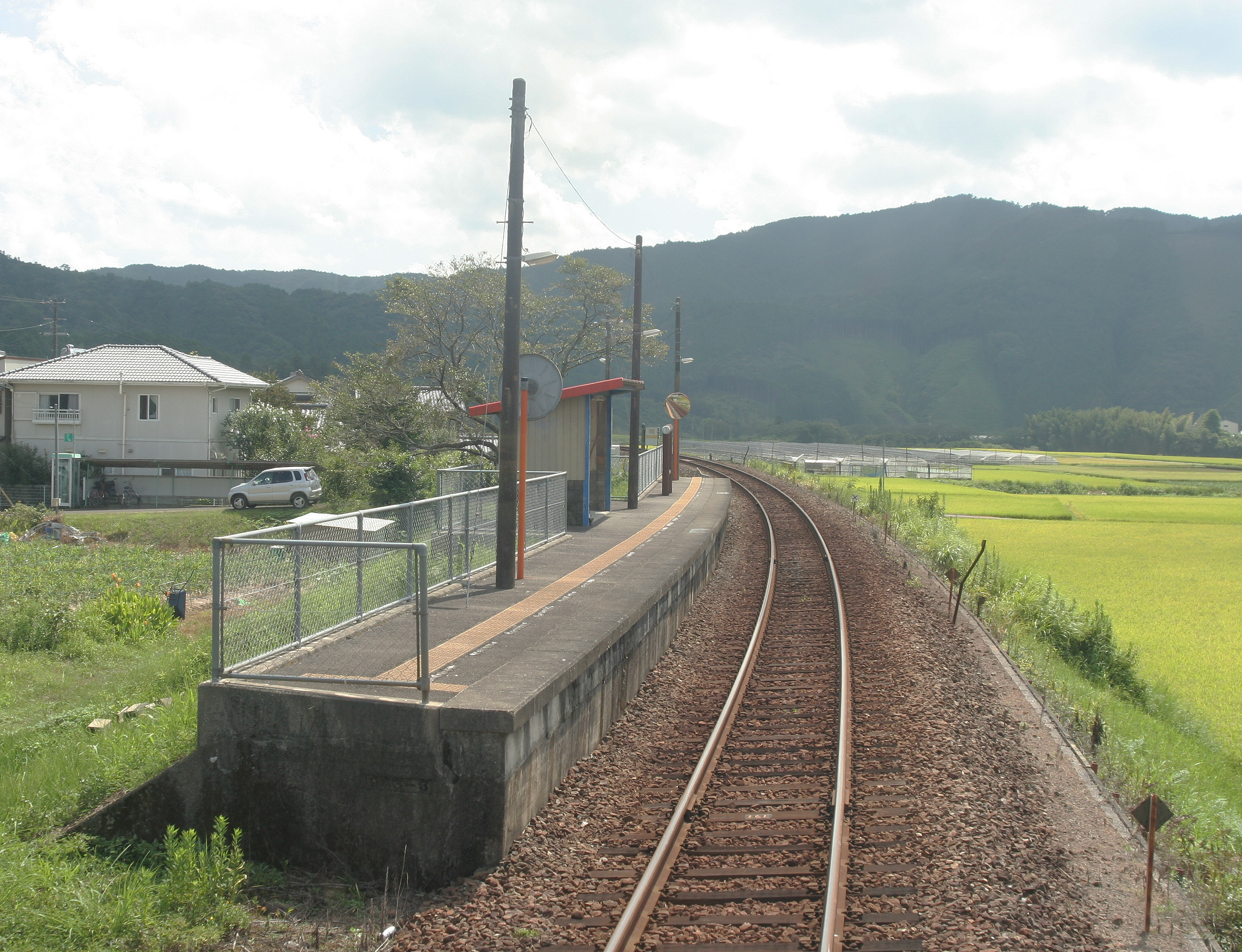
- A view of the platform of Wakai station in September 2007

General information
- Location: Wakai, Shimanto Town, Takaoka District; Kōchi Prefecture 786-0068; Japan
- Coordinates: 33°11′17″N 133°06′21″E
- Operator: JR Shikoku; Tosa Kuroshio Railway
- Lines: Yodo Line; ■ Tosa Kuroshio Railway Nakamura Line
- Distance: 4.4 km (2.7 mi) from Kubokawa
- Platforms: 1 side platform
- Tracks: 1

Construction
- Accessible: No - steps lead up to platform

Other information
- Status: Unstaffed
- Station code: TK27, G27

History
- Opened: 18 December 1963; 62 years ago

Passengers
- FY2018: 17

Services
| Preceding station | JR Shikoku | Following station |
|---|---|---|
| Iejigawa G28 towards Uwajima | Yodo Line | Kubokawa Terminus |
Location
- Location within Kochi Prefecture Location within Japan

Wakai Station (若井駅, Wakai-eki) is a junction passenger railway station located in the town of Shimanto, Takaoka District, Kōchi Prefecture, Japan. It is operated the third-sector Tosa Kuroshio Railway, for which it is station number "TK27" and is also used by the Shikoku Railway Company (JR Shikoku), for which it has the station number "G27".

== Lines ==
Wakai Station is the nominal terminus of the 77.8 kilometer JR Shikoku Yodo Line to Uwajima Station, although most trains continue past Wakai to terminate at Kubokawa Station. It is also served by the Tosa Kuroshio Railway Nakamura Line and is 4.4 kilometers from the terminus of that line at Kubokawa Station.

== Layout ==
The station has one side platform serving one track, located on an embankment. At an unstaffed station, there is a waiting area on the platform, but no station building. As mentioned above, it is a jointly used station under the jurisdiction of Tosa Kuroshio Railway, and the station name sign is Tosa Kuroshio Railway specification.

== Adjacent stations ==
| « | Service | » |
Tosa Kuroshio Railway
Nakamura Line
| Kubokawa | Local | Kaina |

== Kawaoku S.B. ==
Kawaoku S.B. Kawaoku Shingōjō (川奥信号場) is a junction of Tosa Kuroshio Railway Nakamura Line and Shikoku Railway Company Yodo Line in Kawaoku, Kuroshio, Hata District, Kōchi .

The Yodo Line track divides from Nakamura Line at this junction. The track between this junction and Wakai Station is shared by two lines. The shared track and the junction are possessed by Tosa Kuroshio Railway.

=== Structure ===
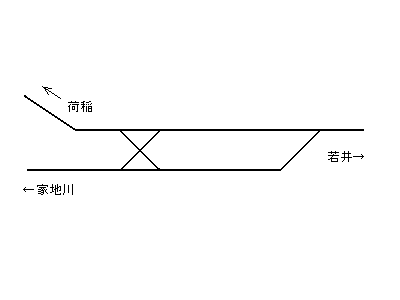
Junction diagram 若井:Wakai (Nakamura Line and Yodo Line) 荷稲:Kaina (Nakamura Line) 家地川:Iejigawa (Yodo Line)

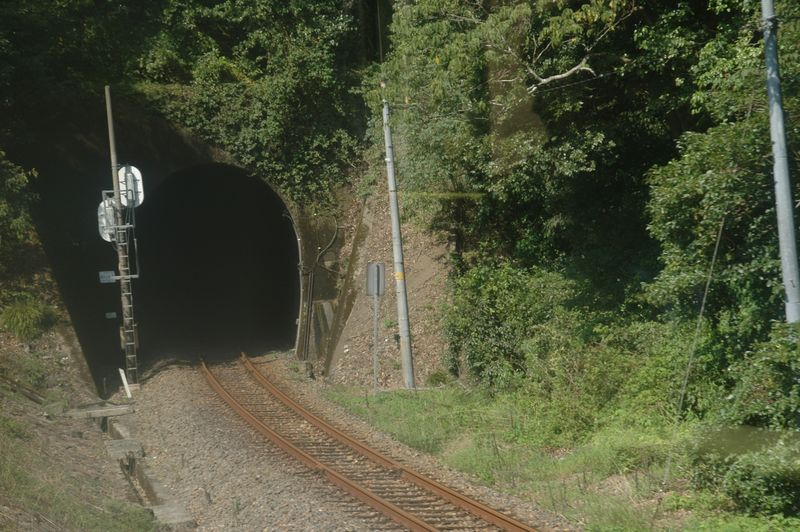
Spiral Loop for Kaina Station (Photo from Yodo Line train. 2005.9.19)

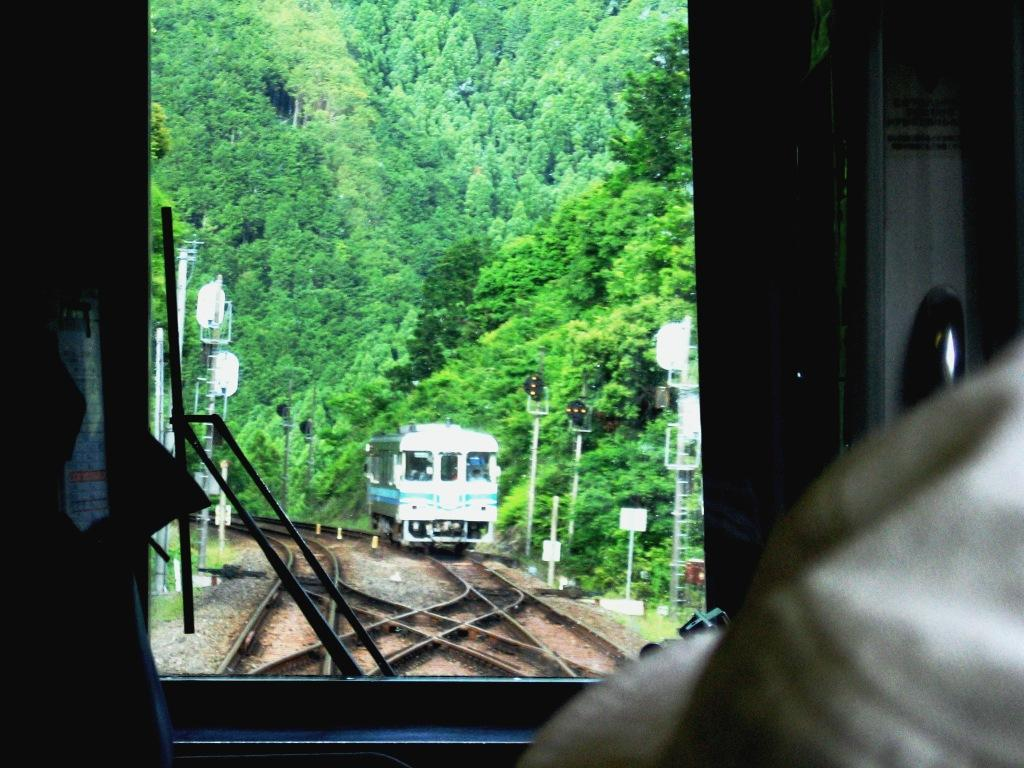
Train for Nakamura staying at the S.B. (photo from Nanpu for Okayama)

This S.B. is about 3.6 km far from Wakai Station. This S.B. is on the way of spiral of Nakamura Line between Wakai and Kaina.

Trains of both lines can pass.

One track is straightened so that the trains of Nakamura Line including limited express Nanpū can pass the S.B. without slowing down.

=== History ===
- 1 March 1974 Yodo Line and this S.B. opened.
- 1 April 1987 Both line and the S.B. were inherited by Shikoku Railway Company.
- 1 April 1988 Nakamura Line and the S.B. were inherited by Tosa Kuroshio Railway.

== Surrounding area ==
- Kotohime Hachiman Shrine
- Japan National Route 381
- Shimanto River

== See also ==
- List of railway stations in Japan
