= List of mergers in Kōchi Prefecture =

Here is a list of mergers in Kōchi Prefecture, Japan since the Heisei era.

== Mergers from April 1, 1999 to Present ==
- On October 1, 2004 - the former town of Ino absorbed the village of Gohoku (both from Agawa District), and the village of Hongawa (from Tosa District) to create the new town of Ino (in Agawa District).
- On January 1, 2005 - the villages of Kagami and Tosayama (both from Tosa District) were merged into the expanded city of Kōchi.
- On February 1, 2005 - the villages of Hayama and Higashitsuno (both from Takaoka District) were merged to create the town of Tsuno.
- On April 10, 2005 - the city of Nakamura was merged with the village of Nishitosa (from Hata District) to create the city of Shimanto.
- On August 1, 2005 - the town of Ikegawa, and the village of Agawa (both from Agawa District), and the village of Niyodo (from Takaoka District) were merged to create the town of Niyodogawa (in Agawa District).
- On January 1, 2006 - the village of Ōnomi (from Takaoka District) was merged into the expanded town of Nakatosa.
- On March 1, 2006 - the towns of Akaoka, Kagami, Noichi and Yasu, and the village of Yoshikawa (all from Kami District) were merged to create the city of Kōnan.
- On March 1, 2006 - the towns of Kahoku and Tosayamada, and the village of Monobe (all from Kami District) were merged to create the city of Kami. Kami District was dissolved as a result of this merger.
- On March 20, 2006 - the town of Kubokawa (from Takaoka District), the town of Taishō, and the village of Towa (from Hata District) were merged to create the town of Shimanto (in Takaoka District).
- On March 20, 2006 - the towns of Ōgata and Saga (both from Hata District) were merged to create the town of Kuroshio.
- On January 1, 2008 - the town of Haruno (from Agawa District) was merged into the expanded city of Kōchi.
