= Nishitosa, Kōchi =

Dissolved municipality in Kochi prefecture, Japan

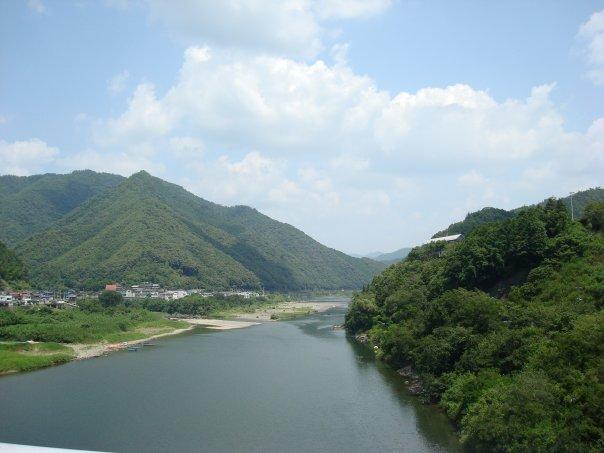

Nishitosa (西土佐村, Nishitosa-mura) is a village located in Hata District, Kōchi, Japan.

On April 10, 2005, Nishitosa, along with the city of Nakamura, was merged to create the city of Shimanto.

== Geography ==
The population of Nishitosa was 3,492 people as of May 31, 2008. The total area was 248.00 km^{2} (96 sq mi). It is approximately 124 km (77 mi) from the capital city of Kōchi. As per a 2010 Natural Census, a total area of 7105 square kilometers, Kochi is the largest prefecture of the four on Shikoku Island and 18th largest in Japan. 84% of this land area is covered in forest, with a population of 764,456.

== Access ==
The main train station, Ekawasaki station on the JR Shikoku Yodo Line, sees only a few local trains each day. There are two other smaller stations, Nishigahō Station and Hage Station.

It is accessible from Ehime prefecture and the town of Shimanto by route 381 and from Nakamura via route 441. It is roughly 3 hours by car to Kōchi city.

There is also a limited bus service, centered on Ekawasaki Station.

== Temperature ==
In the summer, the temperatures reach an average of 32 °C in the day and about 26 °C at night. In Kōchi, typhoon season lasts from July until September. In the winter, temperatures average 13 °C in the daytime and 5 °C at night. It occasionally snows in the winter and many people use kerosene heaters to keep warm.

== Tourism ==
The area is known for the views of the Shimanto river, said to be the cleanest river in Japan, and for the ayu fish. Tourists flock to the area in the summer for camping and canoeing.

The area is also good for firefly viewing. In June, there is a firefly festival, and fireflies can easily be seen from many of the "chinkabashi" (Low water crossing).

== Wildlife ==
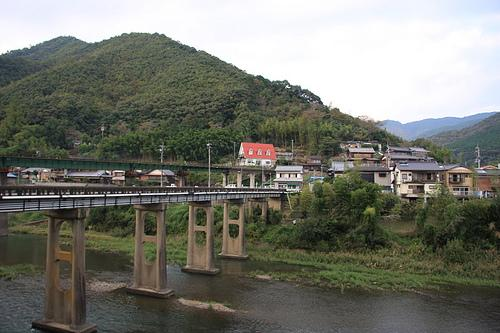

Wild boars, deer, tanuki, rabbits and monkeys are frequently seen in the area. Deer in particular are a pest to farmers, and can be seen on many of the roads at night.

== Education ==
Prior to April 2012, there were seven elementary schools, one junior high school, one high school and three nursery schools in the former village's area. However, due to falling student numbers, the elementary schools merged into one school, Nishitosa Elementary School, and one of the nursery schools closed. Currently, the junior high school, elementary school, and two nursery schools are visited regularly by one resident ALT, as part of the JET Programme. The high school is visited by a separate, privately contracted ALT.
