= Tosa-Taishō Station =

Railway station in Shimanto, Kōchi Prefecture, Japan

G30 Tosa-Taishō Station 土佐大正駅
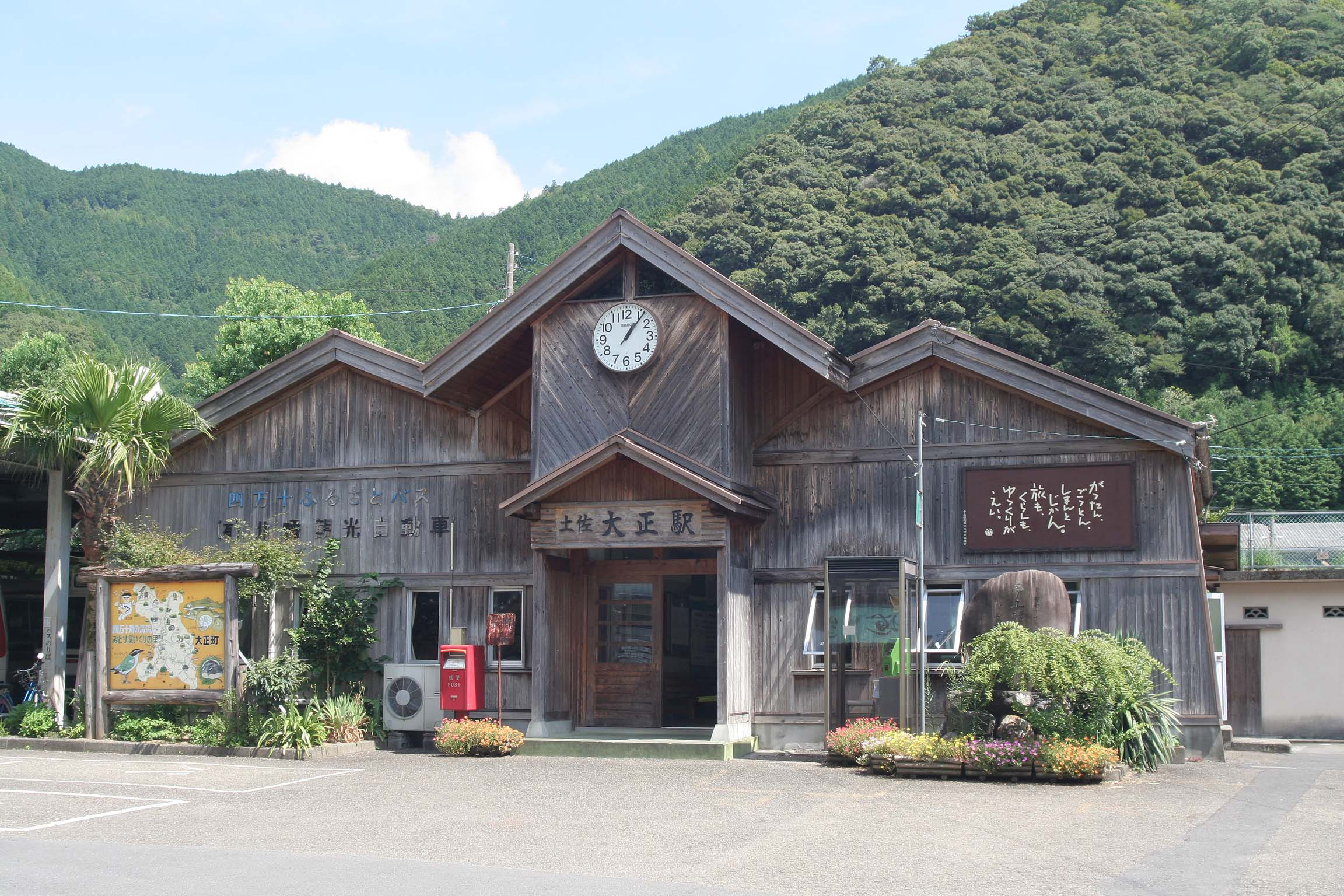
- Facade of Tosa-Taishō Station in 2007

General information
- Location: Taishō, Shimanto-chō, Takaoka-gun, Kōchi-ken 786-0301; Japan
- Coordinates: 33°11′41″N 132°58′33″E
- Operator: JR Shikoku
- Line: ■ Yodo Line
- Distance: 17.6 km from Wakai
- Platforms: 1 island platform
- Tracks: 2
- Connections: Bus stop

Construction
- Parking: Available
- Cycle facilities: No bike shed
- Accessible: No - steps lead up to platform

Other information
- Status: Staffed (Kan'i itaku station)
- Station code: G30

History
- Opened: 1 March 1974

Passengers
- FY2018: 30

Services
Preceding station	JR Shikoku	Following station
Tosa-Shōwa G31 towards Uwajima	Yodo Line	Utsuigawa G29 towards Kubokawa
Location
- Location within Kochi Prefecture Location within Japan

Tosa-Taishō Station (土佐大正駅, Tosa-Taishō-eki) is a passenger railway station located in the town of Shimanto, Takaoka District, Kōchi, Japan. It is operated by Shikoku Railway Company (JR Shikoku). The station bears the number "G30".

== Lines ==
The station is served by JR Shikoku's Yodo Line and is 17.6 kilometers from the starting point of then line at Wakai.

== Layout ==
The station building is built of timber in the style of a mountain lodge. There is a ticket window, waiting area and a shop. A tunnel and a flight of steps lead from the station to an island platform serving two tracks. Parking is available on a paved compound beside the track. A bus company maintains an office in the station premises and there is a bus depot next to the building.

== History ==
The station opened on 1 March 1974 under the control of Japanese National Railways. After the privatization of JNR on 1 April 1987, control of the station passed to JR Shikoku.

== Surrounding area ==
- The station is located in the centre of the former town of Taishō which was merged into the town of Shimanto in 2006.
- Shimanto River - runs next to Taisho near the station.
- National Route 381 - runs through Taisho between the station and the river.
- Old Takeuchi Family Residence - half a kilometer from the station. It is an example of a traditional mountain village farmhouse of thatch and timber construction which has been listed as an Important Cultural Property.
- Mutemuka Brewery (無手無冠) - a sake brewery which also produces a shōchū made from chestnuts.
- Todoroki Park (轟公園) - a local recreation area with a windmill made of stone.
- River Park Todoroki (轟公園) - a campsite by the Shimanto River.
- Shimanto Taishō Road Station - a service station along National Route 381.

== See also ==
- List of railway stations in Japan
