= List of cities in Kōchi Prefecture by population =

The following list sorts all cities (including towns) in the Japanese prefecture of Kōchi with a population of more than 5,000 according to the 2020 Census. As of October 1, 2020, 18 places fulfill this criterion and are listed here. This list refers only to the population of individual cities, towns and villages within their defined limits, which does not include other municipalities or suburban areas within urban agglomerations.

== List ==
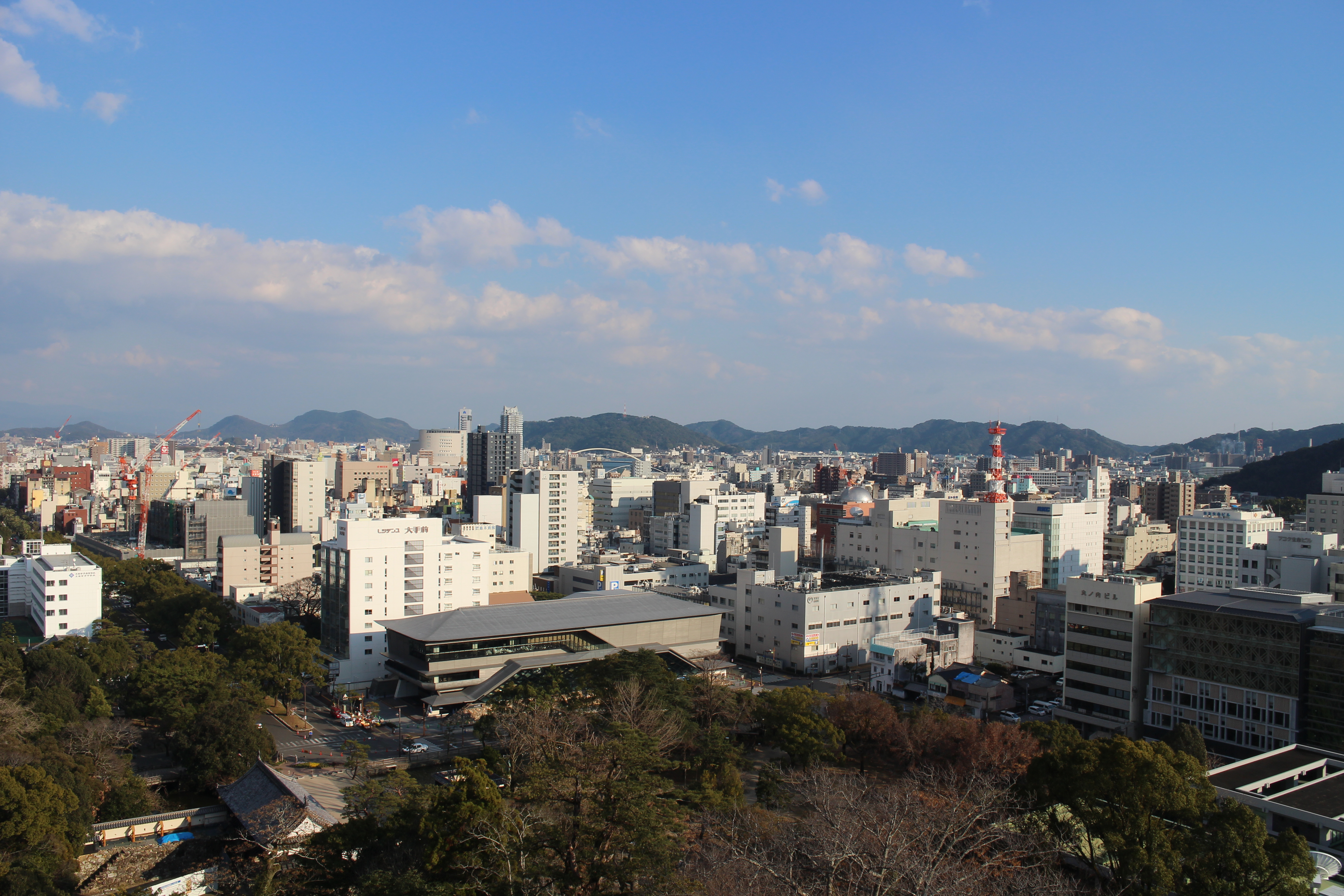
01.Kōchi

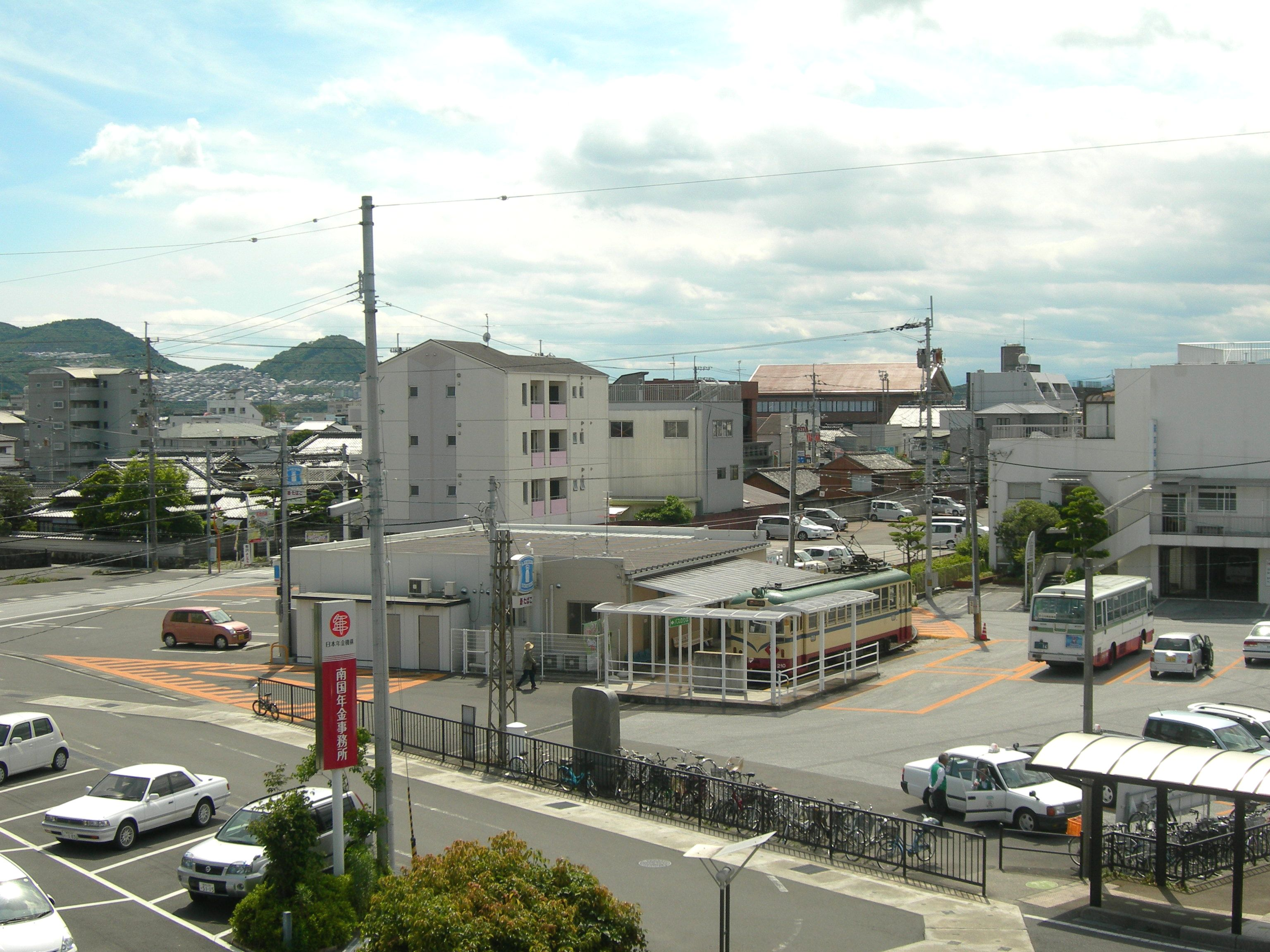
02.Nankoku

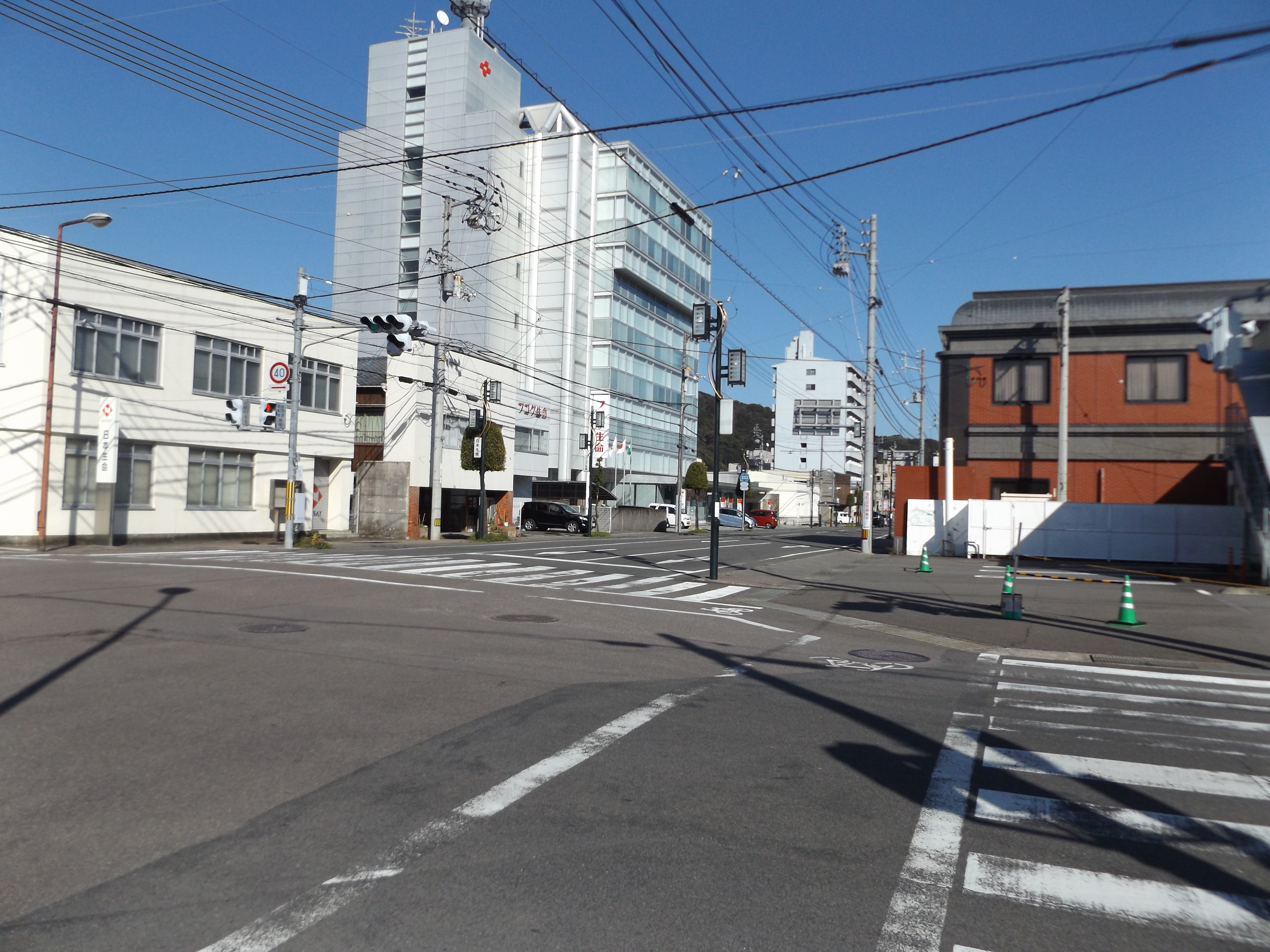
03.Shimanto

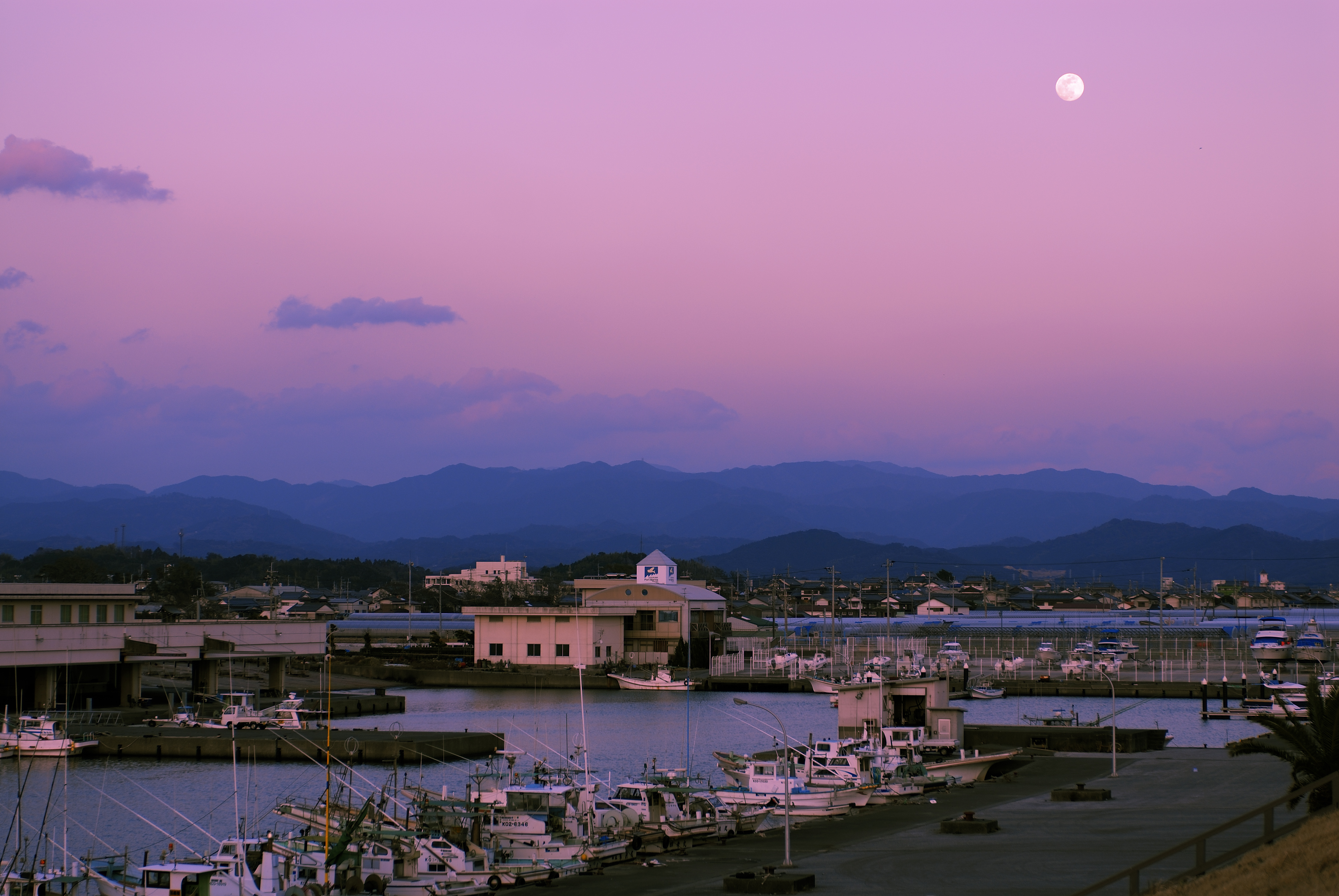
04.Kōnan

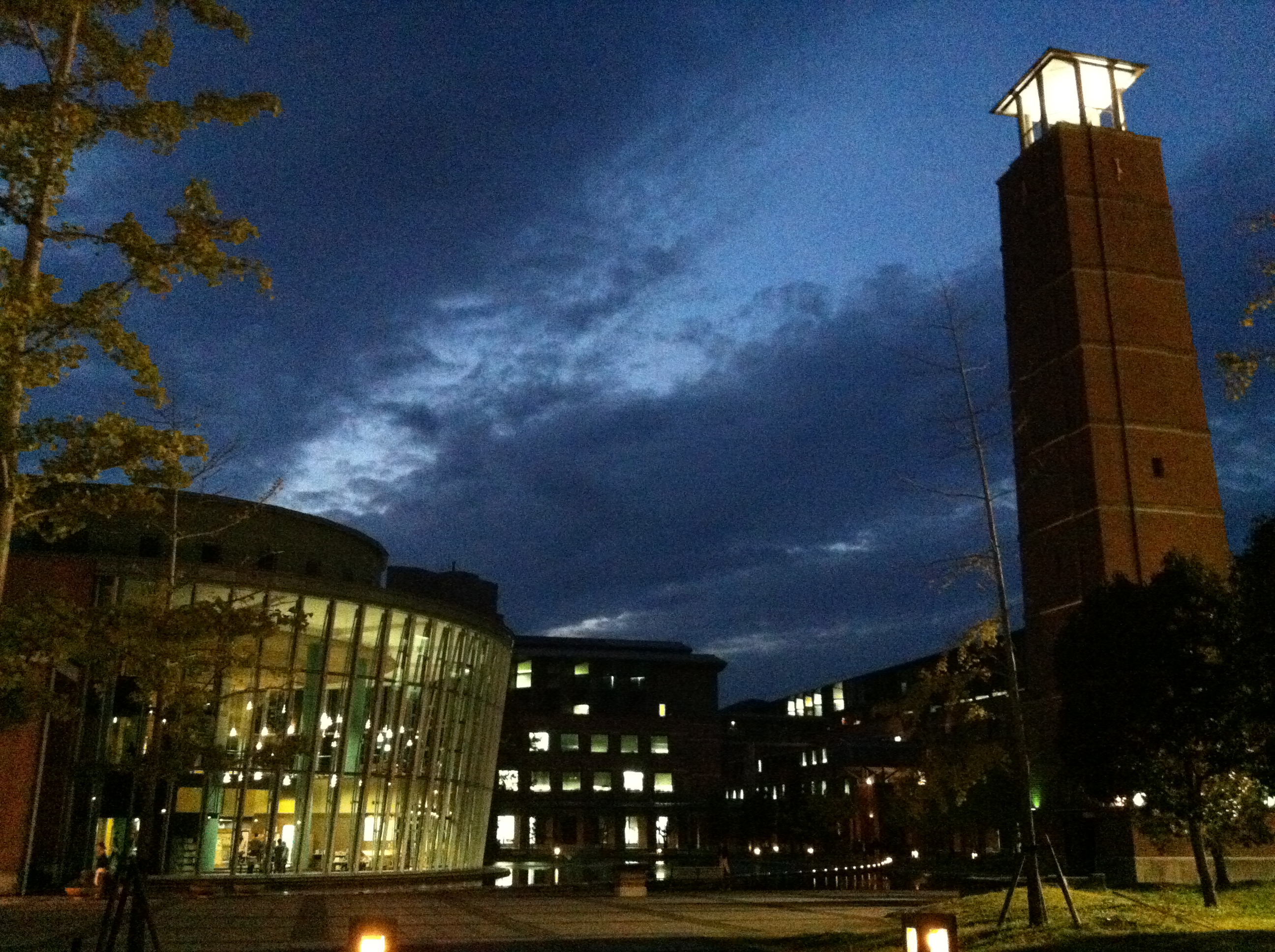
05.Kami

The following table lists the 18 cities and towns in Kōchi with a population of at least 5,000 on October 1, 2020, according to the 2020 Census. The table also gives an overview of the evolution of the population since the 1995 census.

Rank (2020)	Name	Status	2020	2015	2010	2005	2000	1995
1	Kōchi	City	326,814	337,190	343,393	348,990	348,979	339,864
2	Nankoku	City	46,702	47,982	49,472	50,758	49,965	48,245
3	Shimanto	City	32,719	34,313	35,933	37,917	38,784	38,991
4	Kōnan	City	32,229	32,961	33,830	33,541	32,659	31,481
5	Kami	City	26,556	27,513	28,766	30,257	31,175	31,023
6	Tosa	City	25,762	27,038	28,686	30,011	30,338	30,723
7	Ino	Town	21,394	22,767	25,062	27,068	28,729	30,079
8	Susaki	City	20,603	22,606	24,698	26,039	27,569	28,742
9	Sukumo	City	19,044	20,907	22,610	24,397	25,970	25,919
10	Aki	City	16,258	17,577	19,547	20,348	21,321	22,377
11	Shimanto	Town	15,596	17,325	18,712	20,527	21,844	23,081
12	Tosashimizu	City	12,388	13,778	16,029	17,281	18,512	19,582
13	Sakawa	Town	12,336	13,114	13,951	14,447	14,777	15,148
14	Muroto	City	11,744	13,524	15,210	17,490	19,472	21,430
15	Kuroshio	Town	10,275	11,217	12,366	13,437	14,208	15,024
16	Nakatosa	Town	6,002	6,840	7,605	8,320	8,722	9,321
17	Tsuno	Town	5,297	5,794	6,407	6,862	7,258	7,554
18	Ochi	Town	5,191	5,795	6,374	6,952	7,411	7,803
