= Tosa-Shōwa Station =

Railway station in Shimanto, Kōchi Prefecture, Japan

G31 Tosa-Shōwa Station 土佐昭和駅
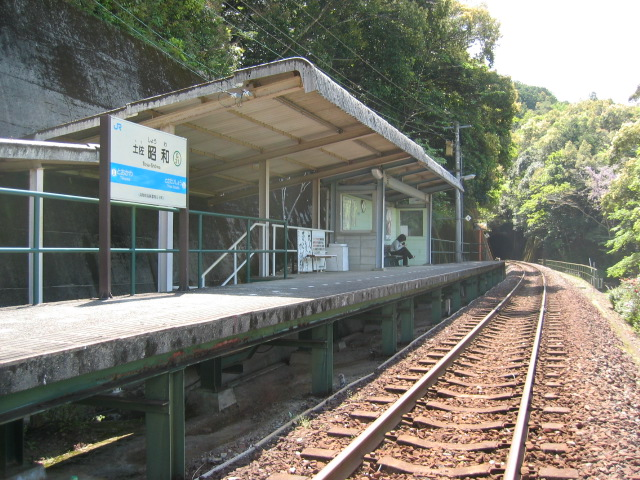
- Platform of Tosa-Shōwa Station in 2006, looking in the direction of Tosa-Taishō

General information
- Location: Shōwa, Shimanto-chō, Takaoka-gun, Kōchi-ken 786-0511; Japan
- Coordinates: 33°13′11″N 132°53′51″E
- Operator: JR Shikoku
- Line: ■ Yodo Line
- Distance: 26.5 km from Wakai
- Platforms: 1 side platform
- Tracks: 1
- Connections: Bus stop

Construction
- Parking: Available
- Cycle facilities: Bike shed
- Accessible: No - steps lead up to platform

Other information
- Status: Unstaffed
- Station code: G31

History
- Opened: 1 March 1974

Passengers
- FY2018: 2

Services
| Preceding station | JR Shikoku | Following station |
|---|---|---|
| Tōkawa G32 towards Uwajima | Yodo Line | Tosa-Taishō G30 towards Kubokawa |
Location
- Location within Kochi Prefecture Location within Japan

Tosa-Shōwa Station (土佐昭和駅, Tosa-Shōwa-eki) is a passenger railway station located in the town of Shimanto, Takaoka District, Kōchi, Japan. It is operated by Shikoku Railway Company (JR Shikoku). It has the station number "G31".

== Lines ==
The station is served by JR Shikoku's Yodo Line, and is 26.5 kilometers from the starting point of the line at Wakai Station.

== Layout ==
Tosa-Shōwa Station consists of a side platform serving a single track which is mounted on an embankment above the level of the town. From the access road, a tunnel goes through the embankment and emerges at a concrete ramp which leads to a flight of steps connecting to the platform on the opposite side of the track. A shelter is provided on the platform for waiting passengers. At the base of the embankment next to the entrance tunnel, a bike shed and limited parking is provided. An unstaffed tourist information centre nearby also serves as a waiting room. The station is not wheelchair accessible.

== History ==
The station opened on 1 March 1974 under the control of Japanese National Railways. After the privatization of JNR on 1 April 1987, control of the station passed to JR Shikoku.

== Surrounding area ==
- Shimanto Municipal Showa Junior High School
- Shimanto Town Showa Elementary School
- Japan National Route 381
- Shimanto River

== See also ==
- List of railway stations in Japan
