= Yoshinobu Station =

Railway station in Matsuno, Ehime Prefecture, Japan

G37 Yoshinobu Station 吉野生駅
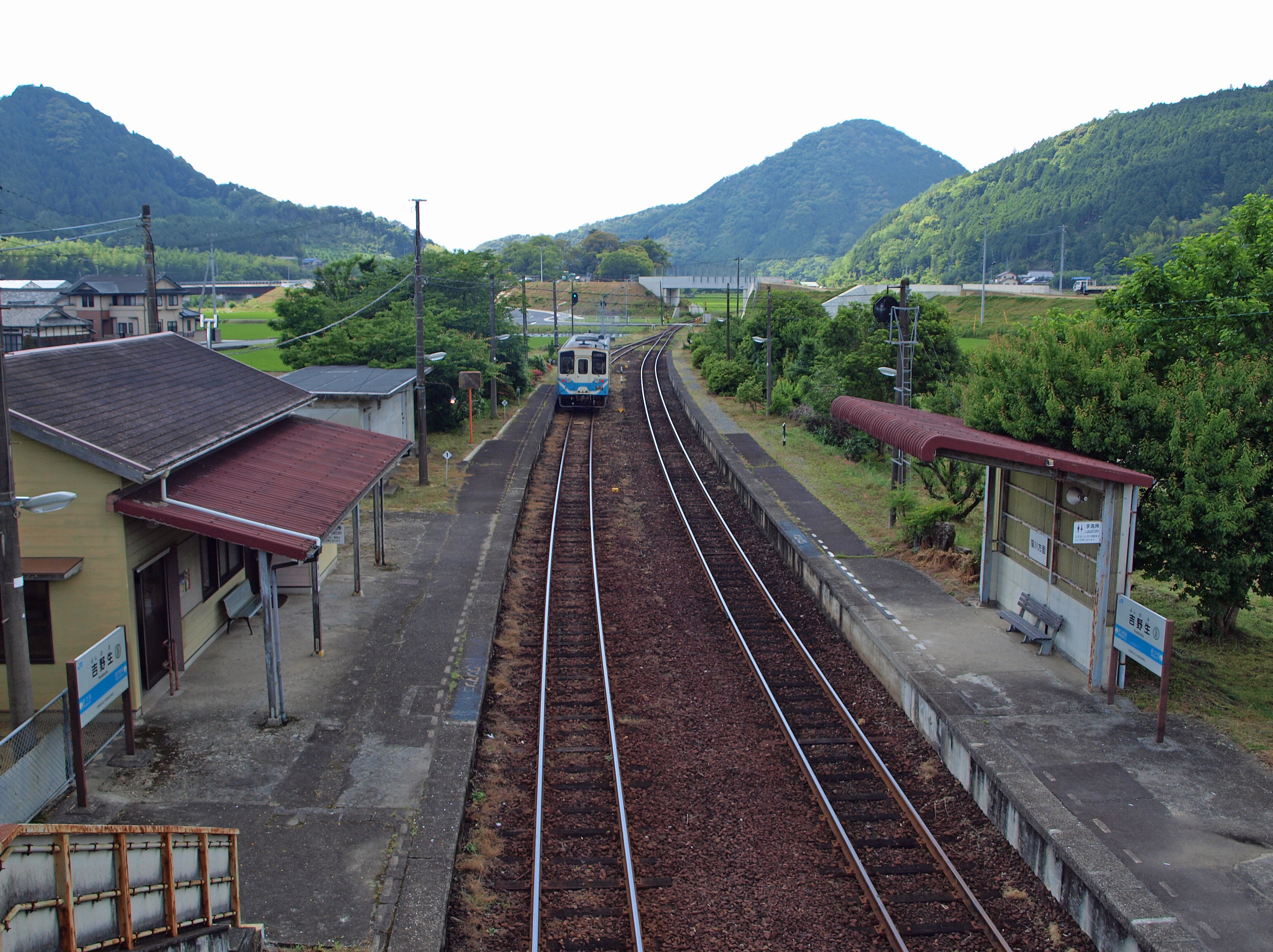
- Yoshinobu Station in 2010

General information
- Location: Yoshino, Matsuno-chō, Kitauwa-gun, Ehime-ken 798-2111; Japan
- Coordinates: 33°13′28.3″N 132°43′45.3″E
- Operator: JR Shikoku
- Line: ■ Yodo Line
- Distance: 53.0 km to Wakai
- Platforms: 2 side platforms
- Tracks: 2

Construction
- Parking: Available
- Cycle facilities: Available but no bike shed
- Accessible: No - overhead bridge to access one platform

Other information
- Status: unstaffed
- Station code: G37

History
- Opened: 12 December 1923

Passengers
- FY2018: 28
Location
- Location within Ehime Prefecture Location within Japan

Yoshinobu Station (吉野生駅, Yoshinobu-eki) is a passenger railway station located in the town of Matsuno, Kitauwa District, Ehime Prefecture, Japan. It is operated by JR Shikoku and has the station number "G37".

== Lines ==
The station is served by JR Shikoku's Yodo Line, and is 53.0 kilometers from the starting point of the line at Wakai.

== Layout ==
The station consists of two opposed side platforms serving two tracks. One platform is connected to a station building which is unstaffed and serves as a waiting room. An overhead bridge leads across the tracks to the other platform which has a passenger shelter.

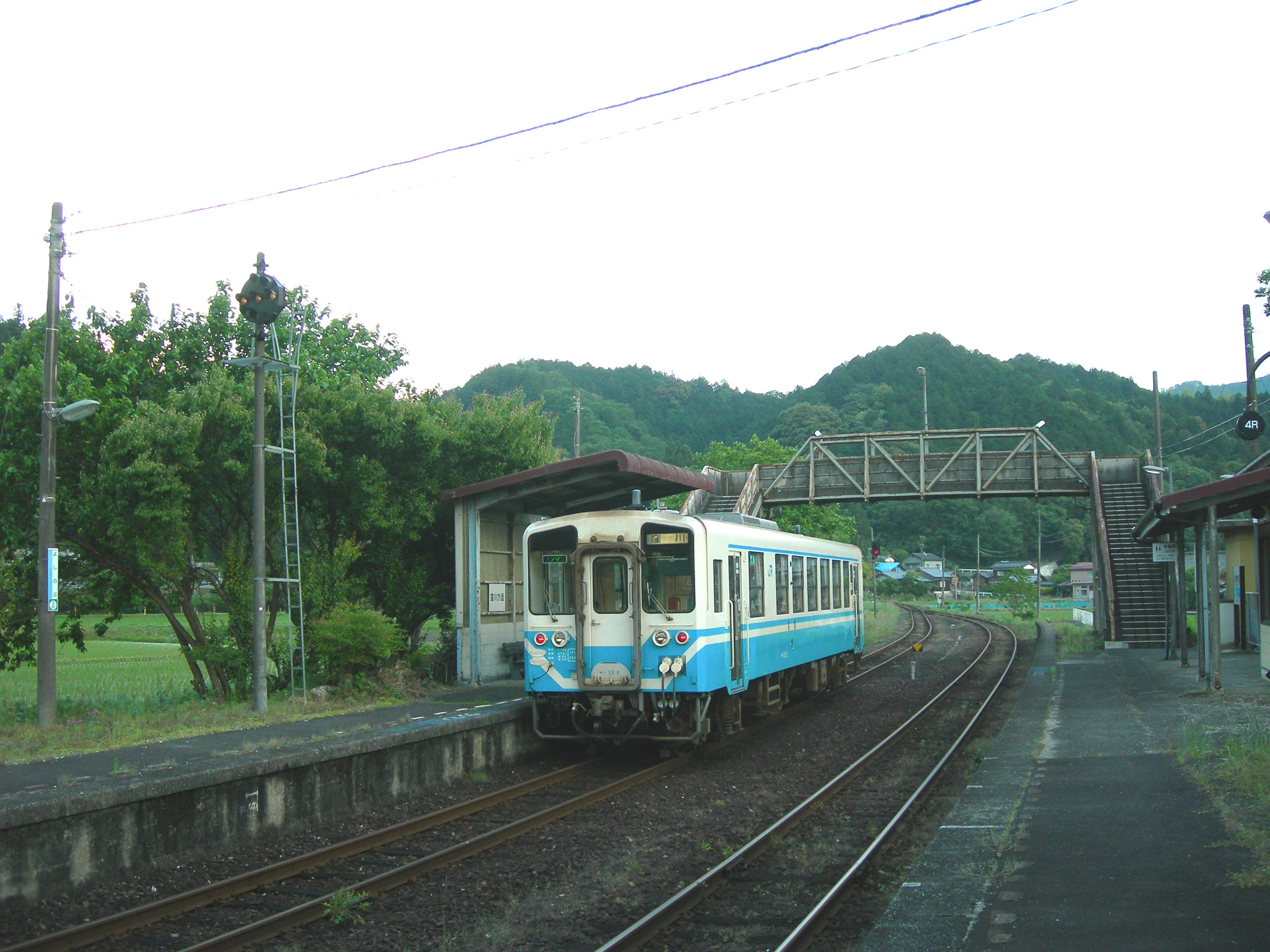
View of the overhead bridge linking the two platforms.

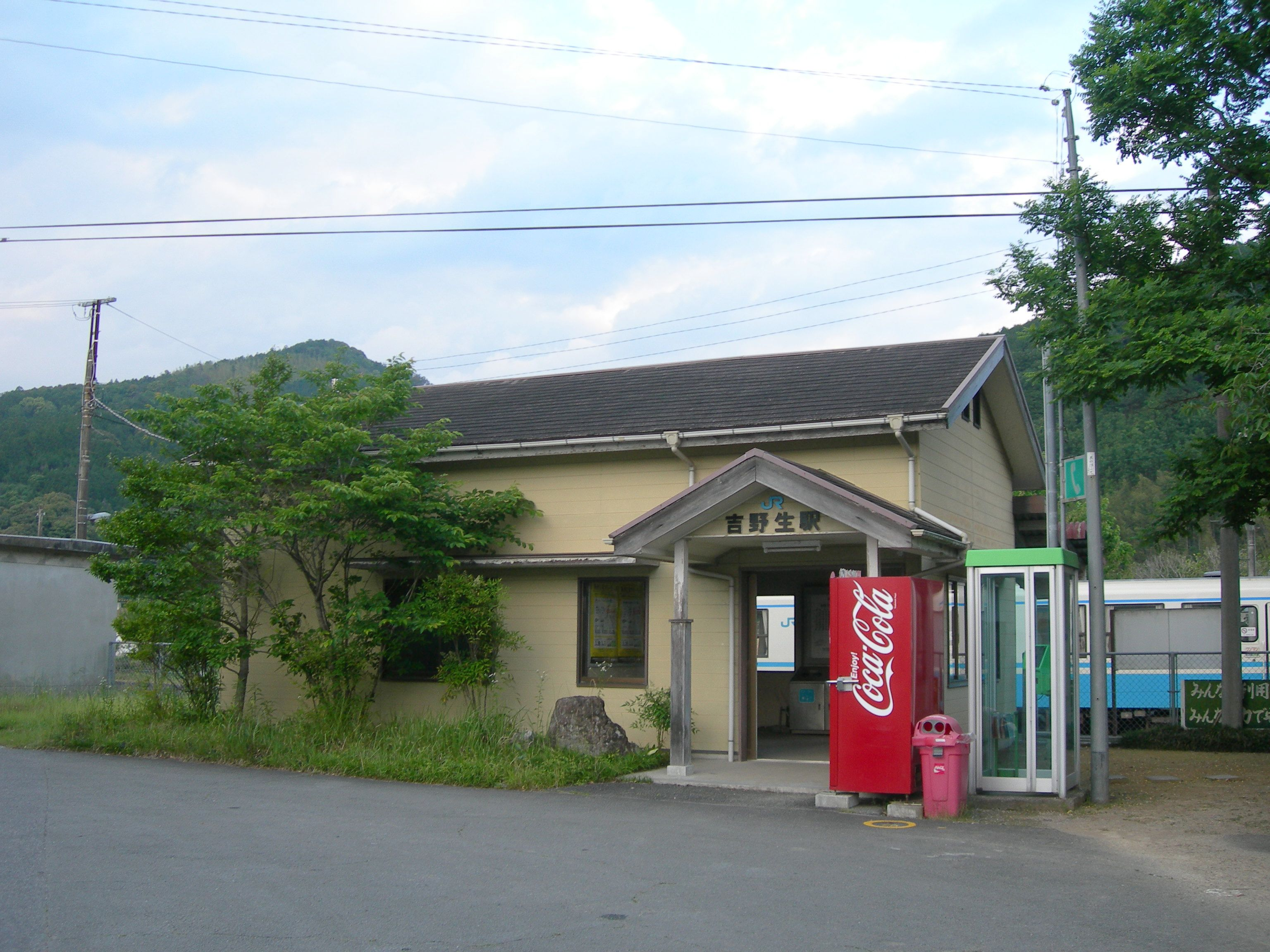
View of the entrance to the station building.

== Adjacent stations ==
«	Service	»
JR Shikoku
Yodo Line
Matsuchi	-	Matsumaru

== History ==
The station opened on 12 December 1923 when a narrow gauge line owned by the Uwajima Railway (宇和島鉄道) from Uwajima to Chikanaga was extended. The station became the new terminus and was given the name Yoshino Station (吉野駅, Yoshinobu-eki). With the nationalization of Uwajima Railway on 1 August 1933, the station came under the control of Japanese Government Railways (JGR), later corporatised as Japan National Railways (JNR) and was renamed Yoshinobu Station (吉野生駅, Yoshinobu-eki). On 26 March 1953, it became a through-station when the line was extended to Ekawasaki.With the privatization of JNR on 1 April 1987, control passed to JR Shikoku.

== Surrounding area ==
- former Yoshinobu town hall
- Hiromi River

== See also ==
- List of railway stations in Japan
