= Tōkawa Station =

Railway station in Shimanto, Kōchi Prefecture, Japan

G32 Tōkawa Station 十川駅
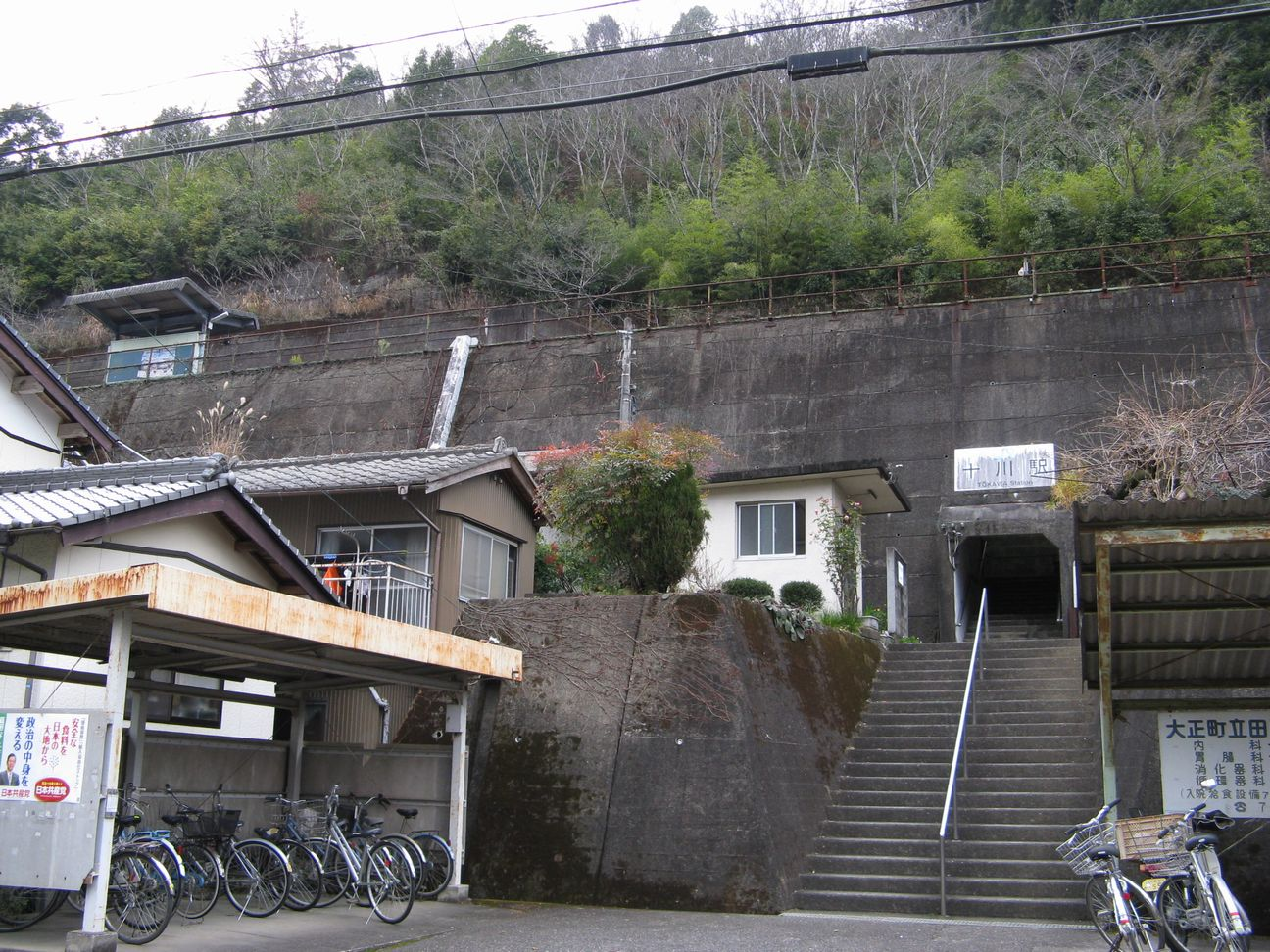
- Tōkawa Station

General information
- Location: Tōkawa, Shimanto-chō, Takaoka-gun, Kōchi-ken 786-0504; Japan
- Coordinates: 33°14′05″N 132°51′21″E
- Operator: JR Shikoku
- Line: ■ Yodo Line
- Distance: 31.0 km from Wakai
- Platforms: 1 island platform

Other information
- Status: Unstaffed
- Station code: G32

History
- Opened: 1 March 1974

Passengers
- FY2018: 20

Services
Preceding station	JR Shikoku	Following station
Hage G33 towards Uwajima	Yodo Line	Tosa-Shōwa G31 towards Kubokawa
Location
- Location within Kochi Prefecture Location within Japan

Tōkawa Station (十川駅, Tōkawa-eki) is a passenger railway station located in the town of Shimanto, Takaoka District, Kōchi, Japan. It is operated by Shikoku Railway Company (JR Shikoku).

== Lines ==
Tōkawa Station is served by the Yodo Line, and is numbered "G32".

== Layout ==
The station consists of a single island platform located on the side of a hill. The island platform is accessed by means of a stairs from underneath, There is no station building, but only a weather shelter on the platform itself. The station is unattended.

== History ==
The station opened on 1 March 1974. With the privatization of JNR on 1 April 1987, the station came under the control of JR Shikoku.

== Surrounding area ==
- Shimanto Town Hall - Towa Branch (Former Towa Village Office)
- Shimanto Municipal Sogawa Elementary School
- Shimanto Municipal Sogawa Junior High School

== See also ==
- List of railway stations in Japan
- Togawa Station, a station in Aomori Prefecture with the same Japanese name
