= Harnischia simantocedea =

Scientific classification
- Kingdom: Animalia
- Phylum: Arthropoda
- Clade: Pancrustacea
- Class: Insecta
- Order: Diptera
- Family: Chironomidae
- Genus: Harnischia
- Species: H. simantocedea

Binomial name
- Harnischia simantocedea Sasa, Suzuki & Tetsuo Sakai, 1998

Species of fly

Harnischia simantocedea is a genus of non-biting midges in the subfamily Chironominae of the bloodworm family Chironomidae. The genus was first described in 1998 by Manabu Sasa, Hiroshi Suzuki and Tetsuo Sakai. The type specimen was collected near the mouth of the Shimanto River.
