= Harnischia =

- Harnischia curtilamellata

Scientific classification
- Kingdom: Animalia
- Phylum: Arthropoda
- Clade: Pancrustacea
- Class: Insecta
- Order: Diptera
- Family: Chironomidae
- Tribe: Chironomini
- Genus: Harnischia; Kieffer, 1921

Type species
- Harnischia fuscimana Kieffer, 1921

Genus of flies

Harnischia is a genus of non-biting midges in the subfamily Chironominae of the bloodworm family Chironomidae. The genus was first described in 1921 by Jean-Jacques Kieffer.

== Species ==
The following species are recognised in the genus Harnischia:

- Harnischia albimanus Harnisch, 1923
- Harnischia angularis Albu & Botnariuc, 1966
- Harnischia atrophus (Kieffer, 1913)
- Harnischia biwacurtus Kawai, Okamoto & Imabayashi, 2002
- Harnischia bulbosa Mukherjee & Hazra, 2023
- Harnischia burganadzae (Chernovsky, 1949)
- Harnischia cultriata Wang, 1999
- Harnischia curtilamellata (Malloch, 1915)
- Harnischia daitoheia Sasa & Suzuki, 2001
- Harnischia disseta Zhang & Ferrington, 2017
- Harnischia falcata (Thienemann & Kieffer, 1916)
- Harnischia fuscimana Kieffer, 1921
- Harnischia ginzandeeus Sasa & Suzuki, 2001
- Harnischia hamata Wang, Zheng & Ji, 1993
- Harnischia inawacedea Sasa, Kitami & Suzuki, 2000
- Harnischia incidata Townes, 1945
- Harnischia japonica Hashimoto, 1984
- Harnischia lacteiforceps (Kieffer, 1923)
- Harnischia lacustris (Haliday, 1840)
- Harnischia latidentata (Konstantinov, 1948)
- Harnischia longispuria Wang, Zheng & Ji, 1993
- Harnischia minuta Dutta & Chaudhuri, 1996
- Harnischia mutila (Goetghebuer, 1921)
- Harnischia ohmuraensis Kobayashi & Suzuki, 1999
- Harnischia orissae (Kieffer, 1913)
- Harnischia parallela Yan & Wang, 2016
- Harnischia sibacedea Sasa, Sumita & Suzuki, 1999
- Harnischia simantocedea Sasa, Suzuki & Sakai, 1998
- Harnischia tenuitubercula Chaudhuri & Chattopadhyay, 1990
- Harnischia turgidula Wang, Zheng & Ji, 1993
- Harnischia westenbergi (Kruseman, 1939)
