= Ekawasaki Station =

Railway station in Shimanto, Kōchi Prefecture, Japan

G34 Ekawasaki Station 江川崎駅
- Ekawasaki Station in 2026

General information
- Location: Nishitosaekawasaki, Shimanto-shi, Kōchi-ken 787-1601; Japan
- Coordinates: 33°10′40″N 132°47′00″E
- Operator: JR Shikoku
- Line: ■ Yodo Line
- Distance: 42.7 km from Wakai
- Platforms: 1 island platform
- Tracks: 2

Construction
- Parking: Available
- Cycle facilities: Bike shed
- Accessible: Yes - paved path across track to platform

Other information
- Status: Kan'i itaku station
- Station code: G34

History
- Opened: 26 March 1953

Passengers
- FY2018: 46

Services
Preceding station	JR Shikoku	Following station
Nishigahō G35 towards Uwajima	Yodo Line	Hage G33 towards Kubokawa
Location
- Location within Kochi Prefecture Location within Japan

Ekawasaki Station (江川崎駅, Ekawasaki-eki) is a passenger railway station located in the Nishitosaekawasaki neighborhood of the city of Shimanto, Kōchi Prefecture, Japan. It is operated by JR Shikoku and has the station number "G34".

== Lines ==
The station is served by JR Shikoku's Yodo Line, and is 42.7 kilometers from the starting point of the line at Wakai.

== Layout ==
The station consists of an island platform serving two tracks. A paved concrete path leads from the platform across one track to a station building which serves as a waiting room. There was originally a JR Shikoku operated ticket counter but this was closed in 2010. Subsequently, Ekawasaki became a Kan'i itaku station. A tourist information centre with a restaurant and shop is located next to the station building. Nearby is a bike shed. Parking for cars is available on the forecourt of the station.

== History ==
The station opened on 26 March 1953 under the control of Japanese National Railways. After the privatization of JNR on 1 April 1987, control of the station passed to JR Shikoku.

== Surrounding area ==
- Shimanto Furusato Information Center
- Shimanto River
- Japan National Route 381
- Japan National Route 441

== See also ==
- List of railway stations in Japan
