= Shimanto, Kōchi (town) =

Shimanto 四万十町
- Town
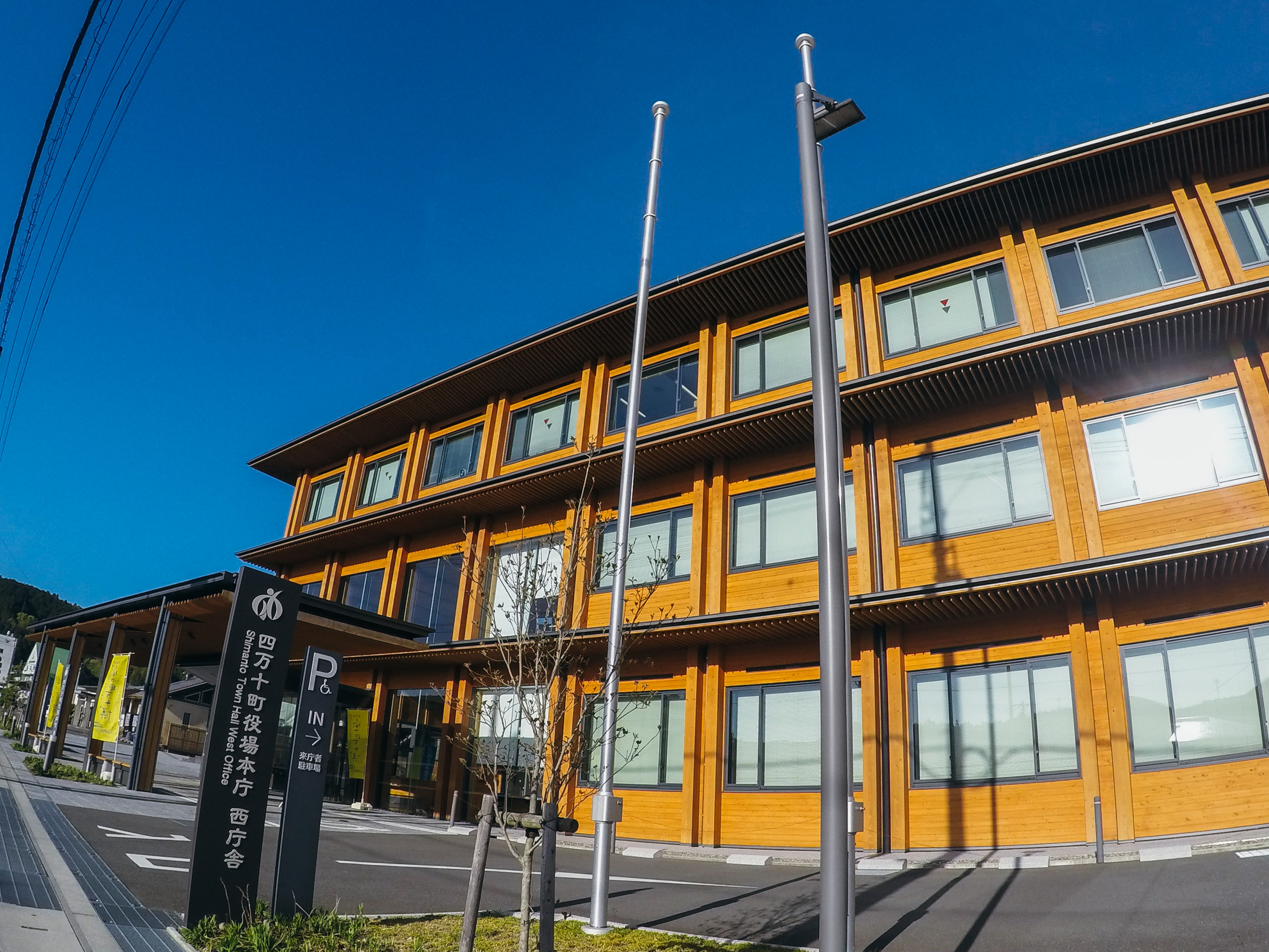
- Shimanto town hall

- Flag Chapter
- Location of Shimanto in Kōchi Prefecture

- Location in Japan
- Coordinates: 33°13′N 133°8′E
- Country: Japan
- Region: Shikoku
- Prefecture: Kōchi
- District: Takaoka

Area
  - Total: 642.30 km^{2} (247.99 sq mi)

Population (July 31, 2015)
  - Total: 15,917
  - Density: 24.781/km^{2} (64.183/sq mi)
- Time zone: UTC+09:00 (JST)
- City hall address: 16-17 Kotohira-cho, Shimanto-chō, Takaoka-gun, Kōchi-ken 786-8501
- Climate: Cfa
- Website: Official website

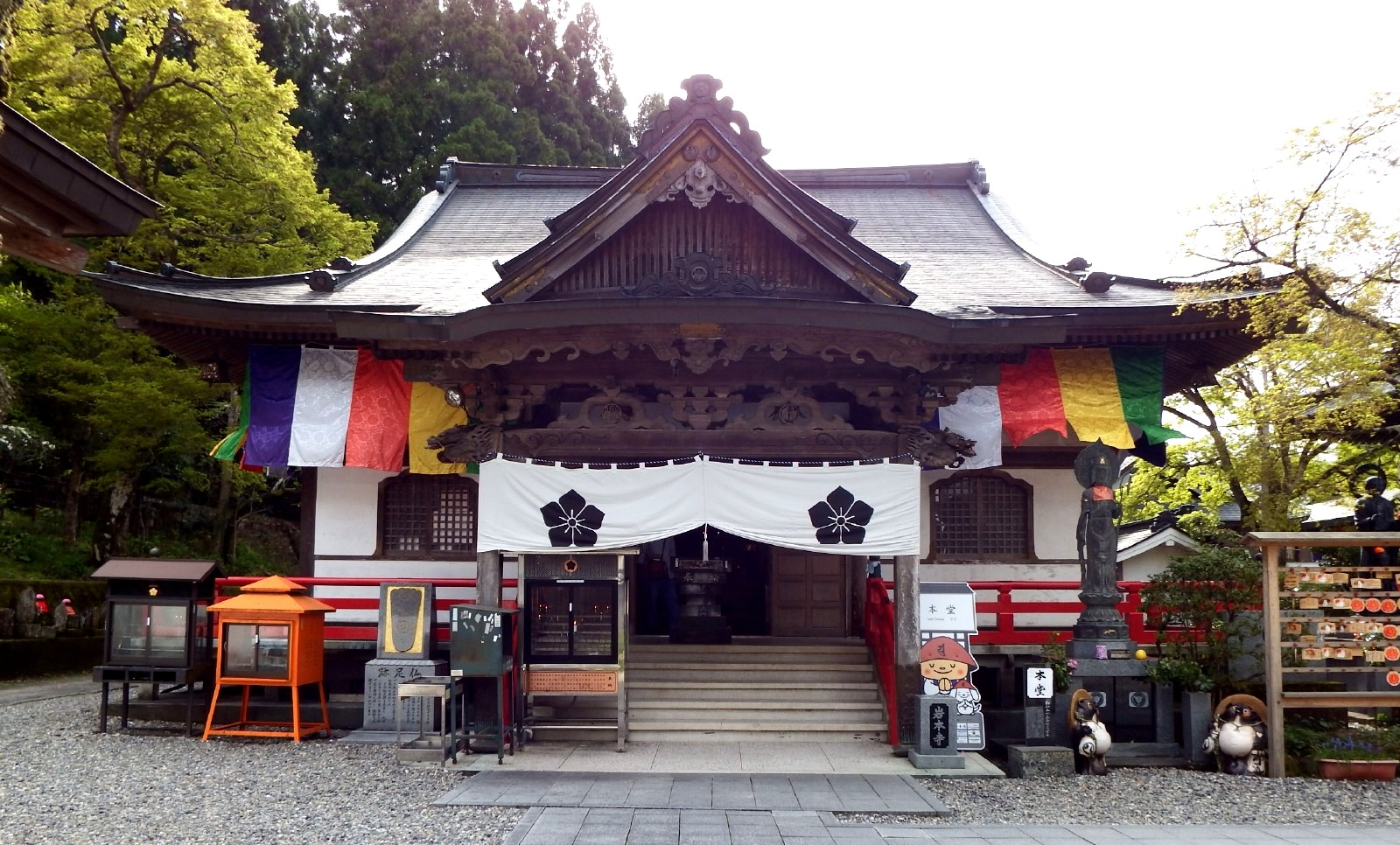
Iwamoto-ji

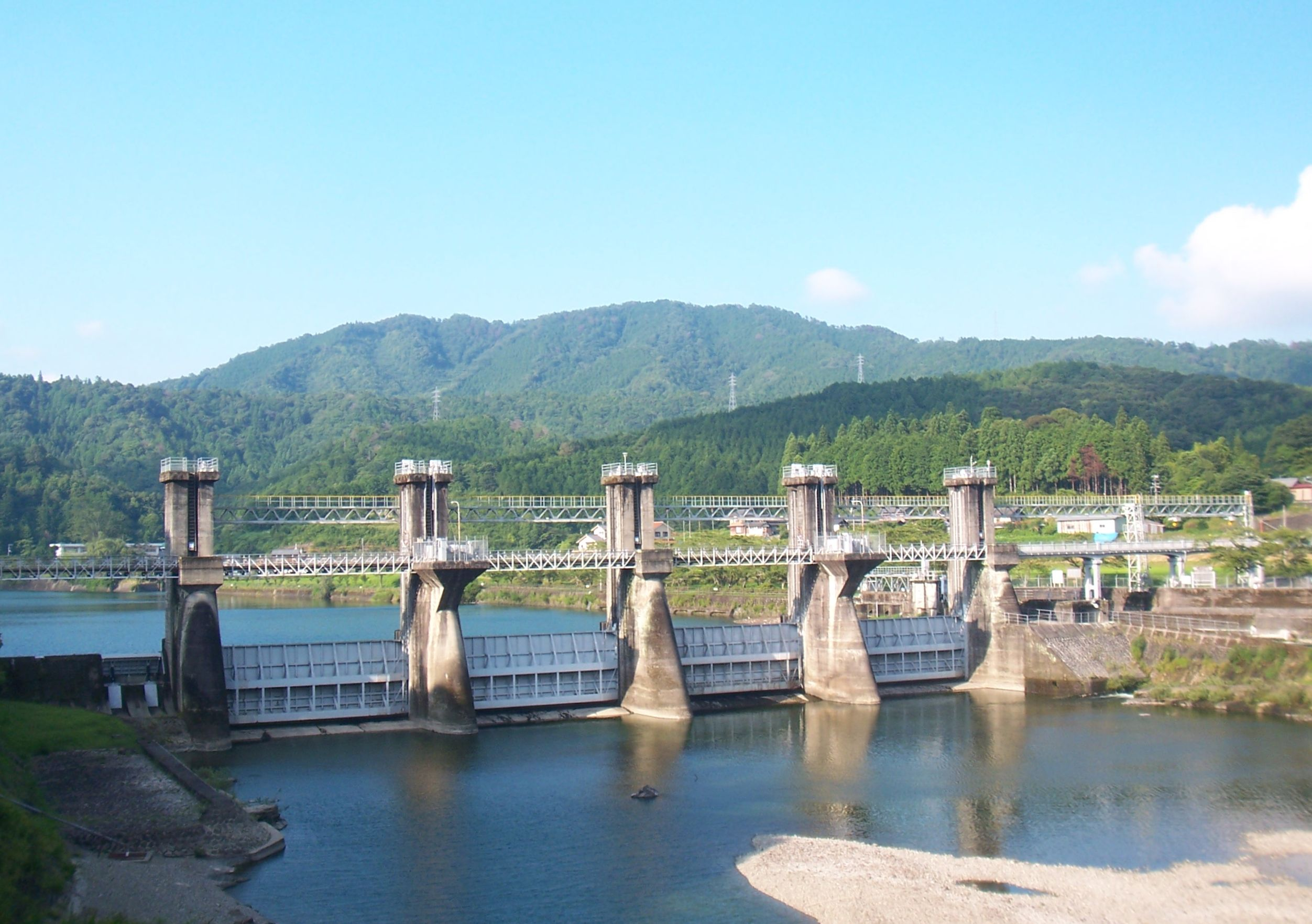
Iejigawa Dam

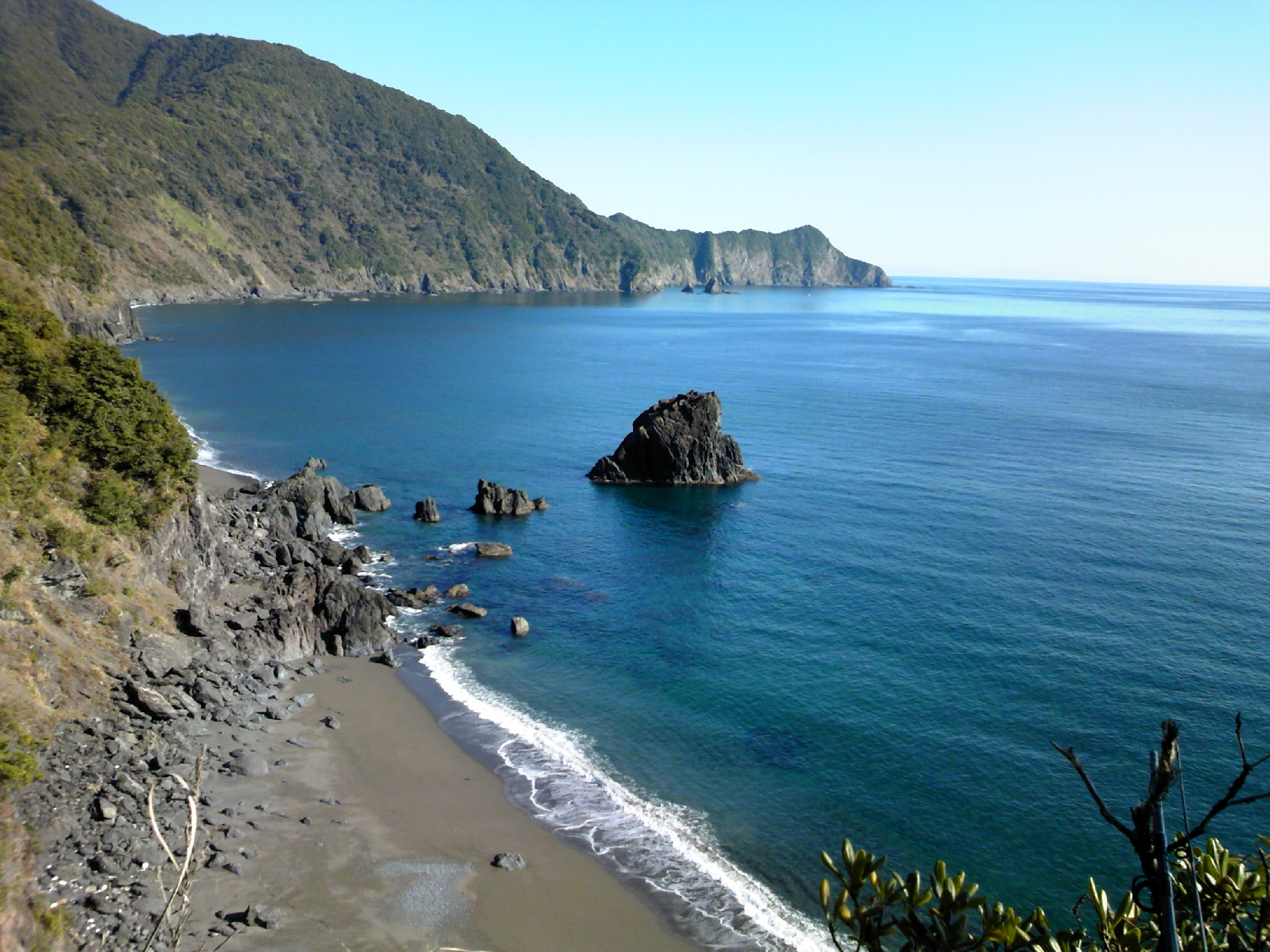
Coastline of Shimanto town

Shimanto (四万十町, Shimanto-chō) is a town located in Takaoka District, Kōchi Prefecture, Japan. As of 31 July 2022, the town had an estimated population of 15‚917 in 8196 households, and a population density of 25 persons per km^{2}. The total area of the town is 642.30 square kilometres (247.99 sq mi).

== Geography ==
Shimanto Town is located in southwestern Kōchi Prefecture on the island of Shikoku. It is on the middle reaches of the Shimanto River, and faces the Pacific Ocean (Tosa Bay) to the east, and borders Ehime Prefecture across the Shikoku Mountains to the northwest.

=== Neighbouring municipalities ===
Ehime Prefecture

- Kihoku
- Matsuno

Kōchi Prefecture

- Kuroshio
- Nakatosa
- Shimanto City
- Tsuno
- Yusuhara

=== Climate ===
Shimanto has a humid subtropical climate (Köppen climate classification Cfa) with hot, humid summers and cool winters. There is significant precipitation throughout the year, especially during June and July. The average annual temperature in Shimanto is 15.0 °C (59.0 °F). The average annual rainfall is 3,251.0 mm (127.99 in) with September as the wettest month. The temperatures are highest on average in August, at around 25.9 °C (78.6 °F), and lowest in January, at around 4.2 °C (39.6 °F). The highest temperature ever recorded in Shimanto was 38.8 °C (101.8 °F) on 11 August 2013; the coldest temperature ever recorded was −8.9 °C (16.0 °F) on 4 February 1999.

Climate data for Kubokawa, Shimanto (1991−2020 normals, extremes 1977−present)
| Month | Jan | Feb | Mar | Apr | May | Jun | Jul | Aug | Sep | Oct | Nov | Dec | Year |
|---|---|---|---|---|---|---|---|---|---|---|---|---|---|
| Record high °C (°F) | 21.2 (70.2) | 24.2 (75.6) | 27.0 (80.6) | 31.2 (88.2) | 33.0 (91.4) | 33.6 (92.5) | 38.0 (100.4) | 38.8 (101.8) | 36.4 (97.5) | 31.6 (88.9) | 26.5 (79.7) | 22.1 (71.8) | 38.8 (101.8) |
| Mean daily maximum °C (°F) | 10.6 (51.1) | 11.9 (53.4) | 15.2 (59.4) | 19.9 (67.8) | 23.9 (75.0) | 26.1 (79.0) | 30.4 (86.7) | 31.0 (87.8) | 28.0 (82.4) | 23.6 (74.5) | 18.2 (64.8) | 12.8 (55.0) | 21.0 (69.7) |
| Daily mean °C (°F) | 4.2 (39.6) | 5.3 (41.5) | 8.8 (47.8) | 13.6 (56.5) | 18.1 (64.6) | 21.4 (70.5) | 25.4 (77.7) | 25.9 (78.6) | 22.7 (72.9) | 17.2 (63.0) | 11.4 (52.5) | 6.1 (43.0) | 15.0 (59.0) |
| Mean daily minimum °C (°F) | −1.1 (30.0) | −0.3 (31.5) | 2.9 (37.2) | 7.6 (45.7) | 12.9 (55.2) | 17.7 (63.9) | 21.7 (71.1) | 22.2 (72.0) | 18.9 (66.0) | 12.4 (54.3) | 6.1 (43.0) | 0.7 (33.3) | 10.1 (50.3) |
| Record low °C (°F) | −8.5 (16.7) | −8.9 (16.0) | −7.0 (19.4) | −2.5 (27.5) | 2.5 (36.5) | 8.4 (47.1) | 14.1 (57.4) | 13.7 (56.7) | 7.3 (45.1) | 0.2 (32.4) | −3.9 (25.0) | −8.9 (16.0) | −8.9 (16.0) |
| Average precipitation mm (inches) | 84.7 (3.33) | 115.8 (4.56) | 207.1 (8.15) | 253.9 (10.00) | 308.7 (12.15) | 425.8 (16.76) | 377.9 (14.88) | 415.9 (16.37) | 524.8 (20.66) | 281.4 (11.08) | 158.3 (6.23) | 96.9 (3.81) | 3,251 (127.99) |
| Average precipitation days (≥ 1.0 mm) | 7.2 | 8.2 | 11.1 | 10.5 | 10.9 | 15.2 | 13.4 | 13.5 | 14.0 | 9.5 | 8.1 | 7.5 | 129.1 |
| Mean monthly sunshine hours | 173.8 | 166.1 | 188.6 | 190.4 | 186.8 | 123.8 | 168.6 | 191.5 | 140.2 | 168.9 | 160.9 | 172.4 | 2,035.8 |
Source: Japan Meteorological Agency

== Demographics ==
Per Japanese census data, the population of Shimanto in 2020 is 15,607 people. Shimanto has been conducting censuses since 1920.

Historical population
| Year | Pop. | ±% |
|---|---|---|
| 1920 | 30,170 | — |
| 1925 | 30,409 | +0.8% |
| 1930 | 31,106 | +2.3% |
| 1935 | 31,316 | +0.7% |
| 1940 | 31,871 | +1.8% |
| 1945 | 39,935 | +25.3% |
| 1950 | 41,264 | +3.3% |
| 1955 | 41,912 | +1.6% |
| 1960 | 38,584 | −7.9% |
| 1965 | 33,520 | −13.1% |
| 1970 | 29,062 | −13.3% |
| 1975 | 26,969 | −7.2% |
| 1980 | 26,438 | −2.0% |
| 1985 | 25,622 | −3.1% |
| 1990 | 24,226 | −5.4% |
| 1995 | 23,081 | −4.7% |
| 2000 | 21,844 | −5.4% |
| 2005 | 20,527 | −6.0% |
| 2010 | 18,712 | −8.8% |
| 2015 | 17,325 | −7.4% |
| 2020 | 15,607 | −9.9% |
Shimanto population statistics

== History ==
As with all of Kōchi Prefecture, the area of Shimanto Town was part of ancient Tosa Province. During the Edo period, the area was part of the holdings of Tosa Domain ruled by the Yamauchi clan from their seat at Kōchi Castle. Following the Meiji restoration, the village of Kubokawa was established within Takaoka District, Kōchi with the creation of the modern municipalities system on October 1, 1889, and was raised to town status on February 11, 1926. Likewise, the village of Higashi-Kamiyama (東上山村) was established within Hata District, Kōchi, was renamed Taishō village on January 1, 1914, and was raised to town status on August 1, 1947. The town of Shimanto was formed on March 20, 2006, from the merger of the towns of Kubokawa and Taishō, and the village of Towa.

== Government ==
Shimanto has a mayor-council form of government with a directly elected mayor and a unicameral town council of 18 members. Shimanto, together with Nakatosa, Yusuhara and Tsuno, contributes two members to the Kōchi Prefectural Assembly. In terms of national politics, the town is part of Kōchi 2nd district of the lower house of the Diet of Japan.

== Economy ==
The local economy is dominated by agriculture, forestry and commercial fishing, and tourism. The town is one of the largest producers of ginger in Japan.

== Education ==
Shimanto Town has 12 public elementary schools and three public middle schools operated by the town government, and two public high schools operated by the Kōchi Prefectural Board of Education.

== Transportation ==
=== Railway ===
Shikoku Railway Company - Dosan Line

- Kageno - Rokutanji - Niida - Kubokawa

Shikoku Railway Company - Yodo Line

- Kubokawa - Wakai - Iejigawa - Utsuigawa - Tosa-Taishō - Tosa-Shōwa - Tōkawa

Tosa Kuroshio Railway - Nakamura Line

- Kubokawa - Wakai

=== Highways ===
- Kōchi Expressway
- National Route 56
- National Route 381
- National Route 439

== Sister cities ==
- Gochang County, South Korea, friendship city since April 2, 2012

== Local attractions ==
- Iwamoto-ji, 37th temple on the Shikoku Pilgrimage

== Noted people from Shimanto Town ==
- Tani Tateki, general, Imperial Japanese Army
