= Hage Station =

Railway station in Shimanto, Kōchi Prefecture, Japan

G33 Hage Station 半家駅
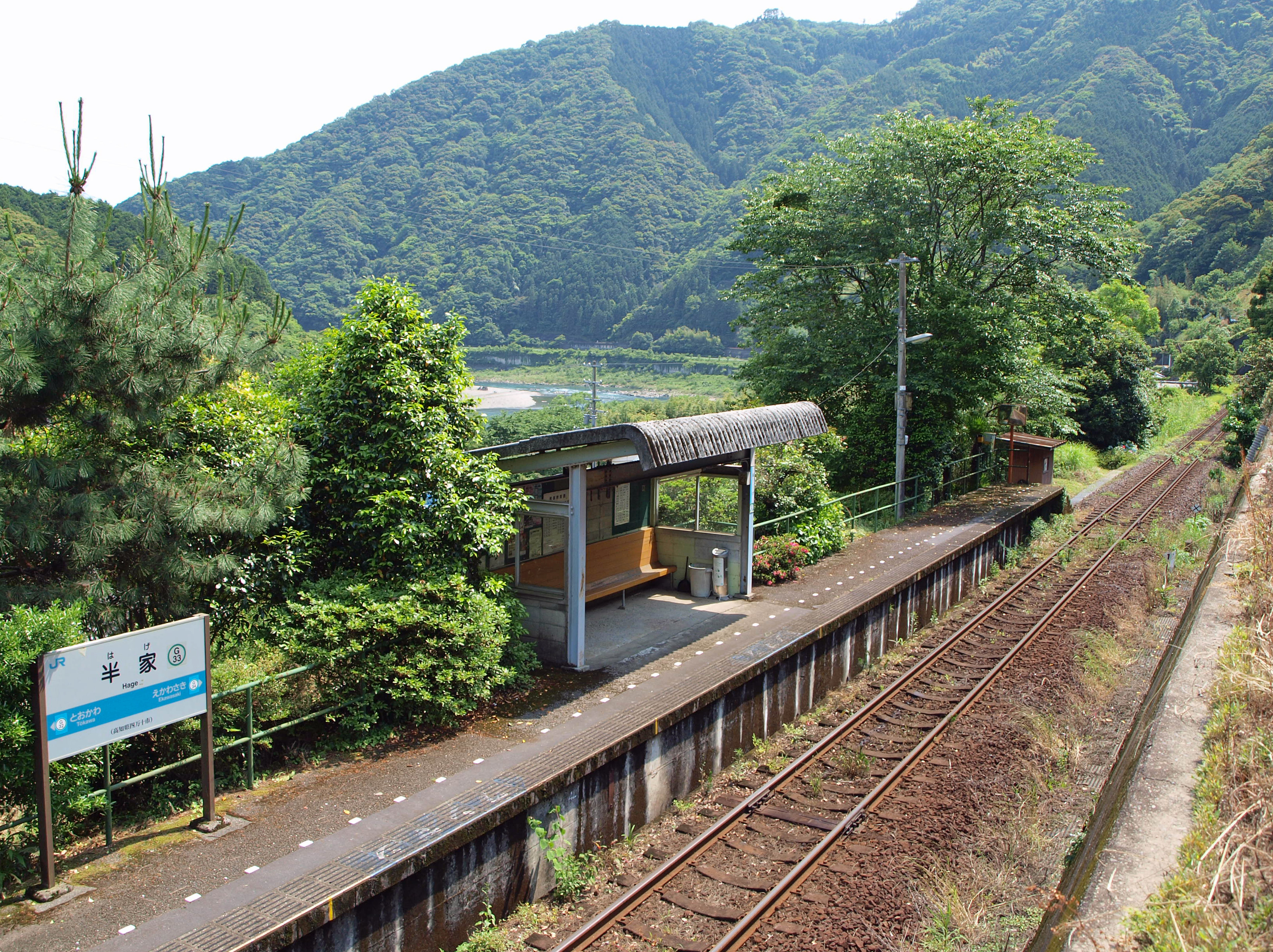
- Platform of Hage Station in 2010

General information
- Location: Nishitosahage, Shimanto-shi, Kōchi-ken 786-1606; Japan
- Coordinates: 33°12′06″N 132°47′29″E
- Operator: JR Shikoku
- Line: ■ Yodo Line
- Distance: 38.9 km from Wakai
- Platforms: 1 side platform
- Tracks: 1
- Connections: Bus stop

Construction
- Parking: Available
- Cycle facilities: Bike shed
- Accessible: No - steps lead up to platform

Other information
- Status: Unstaffed
- Station code: G33

History
- Opened: 1 March 1974

Passengers
- FY2018: 6
Location
- Location within Kochi Prefecture Location within Japan

Hage Station (半家駅, Hage-eki) is a passenger railway station located in the Nishitosahage neighborhood of the city of Shimanto, Kōchi Prefecture, Japan. It is operated by JR Shikoku and has the station number "G33".

== Lines ==
The station is served by JR Shikoku's Yodo Line, and is 38.9 kilometers from the starting point of the line at Wakai.

== Layout ==
The track runs along a hillside. There is no station building and the station is unstaffed. From the main road, National Route 381, a flight of steps leads up to a single side platform. A shelter is provided for waiting passengers. At the base of the stairs and across the road, there are some parking slots, a bike shed, and a public telephone call box.

== Adjacent stations ==
«	Service	»
JR Shikoku
Yodo Line
Tōkawa	-	Ekawasaki

== History ==
The station opened on 1 March 1974 under the control of Japanese National Railways. After the privatization of JNR on 1 April 1987, control of the station passed to JR Shikoku.

== Surrounding area ==
- Shimanto Municipal Honmura Elementary School
- Japan National Route 441

== See also ==
- List of railway stations in Japan
