= Matsuchi Station =

Railway station in Matsuno, Ehime Prefecture, Japan

G36 Matsuchi Station 真土駅
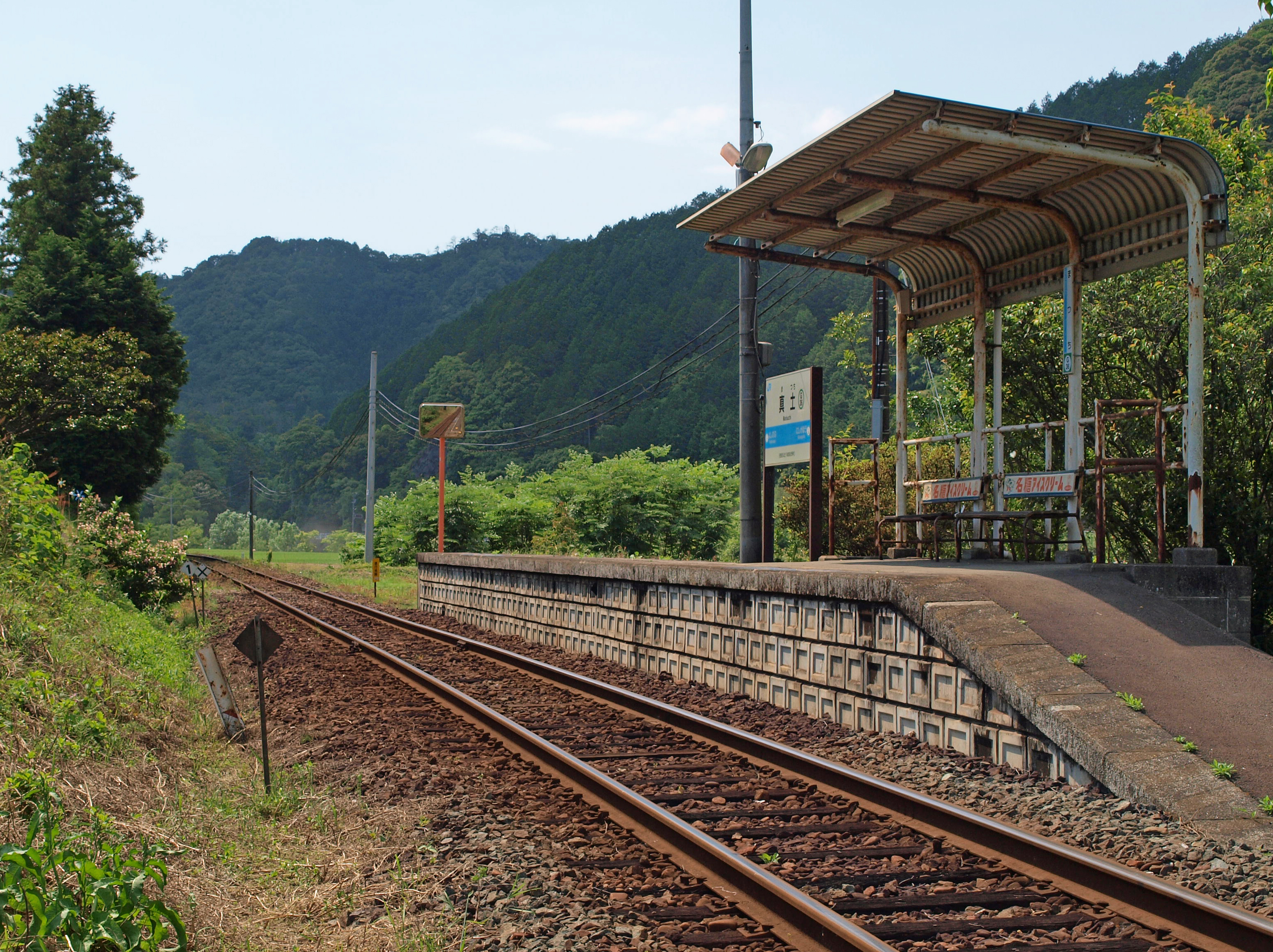
- Platform of Matsuchi Station in 2010

General information
- Location: Warabio, Matsuno-chō, Kitauwa-gun, Ehime-ken 798-2112; Japan
- Coordinates: 33°13′26.6″N 132°44′42.7″E
- Operator: JR Shikoku
- Line: ■ Yodo Line
- Distance: 51.3 km from Wakai
- Platforms: 1 side platform
- Tracks: 1

Construction
- Parking: Available
- Cycle facilities: Bike shed
- Accessible: Yes - ramp leads up to platform

Other information
- Status: unstaffed
- Station code: G36

History
- Opened: 1 October 1960

Passengers
- FY2018: 6
Location
- Location within Ehime Prefecture Location within Japan

Matsuchi Station (真土駅, Matsuchi-eki) is a passenger railway station located in the town of Matsuno, Kitauwa District, Ehime Prefecture, Japan. It is operated by JR Shikoku and has the station number "G36".

== Lines ==
The station is served by JR Shikoku's Yodo Line, and is 51.3 kilometers from the starting point of the line at Wakai.

== Layout ==
The station consists of a side platform serving a single track. A shelter is provided for passengers on the platform. Immediately behind the platform is an enclosed waiting room and a toilet shed. A ramp leads up from the access road to the platform. Next to the ramp is a bike shed and a public telephone call box. The station is wheelchair accessible.

== Adjacent stations ==
| « | Service | » |
JR Shikoku
Yodo Line
| Nishigahō | - | Yoshinobu |

== History ==
The station opened on 01 October 1960 under the control of Japanese National Railways. After the privatization of JNR on 1 April 1987, control of the station passed to JR Shikoku.

== Surrounding area ==
- Hiromi River

== See also ==
- List of railway stations in Japan
