= Nakamura, Kōchi =

Former city in Kōchi, Japan

Nakamura (中村市, Nakamura-shi) was a city located in Kōchi Prefecture, Japan. The city was in the southwestern part of Kōchi and known for its shrine. The city was elevated from town status on March 31, 1954. It is on the banks of the Shimanto-gawa, the last free flowing river in Japan.

As of 2003, the city had an estimated population of 34,366 and the density of 89.38 persons per km^{2}. The total area was 384.50 km^{2}.

On April 10, 2005, Nakamura, along with the village of Nishitosa (from Hata District), was merged to create the city of Shimanto.
