= Nishigahō Station =

Railway station in Shimanto, Kōchi Prefecture, Japan

G35 Nishigahō Station 西ヶ方駅
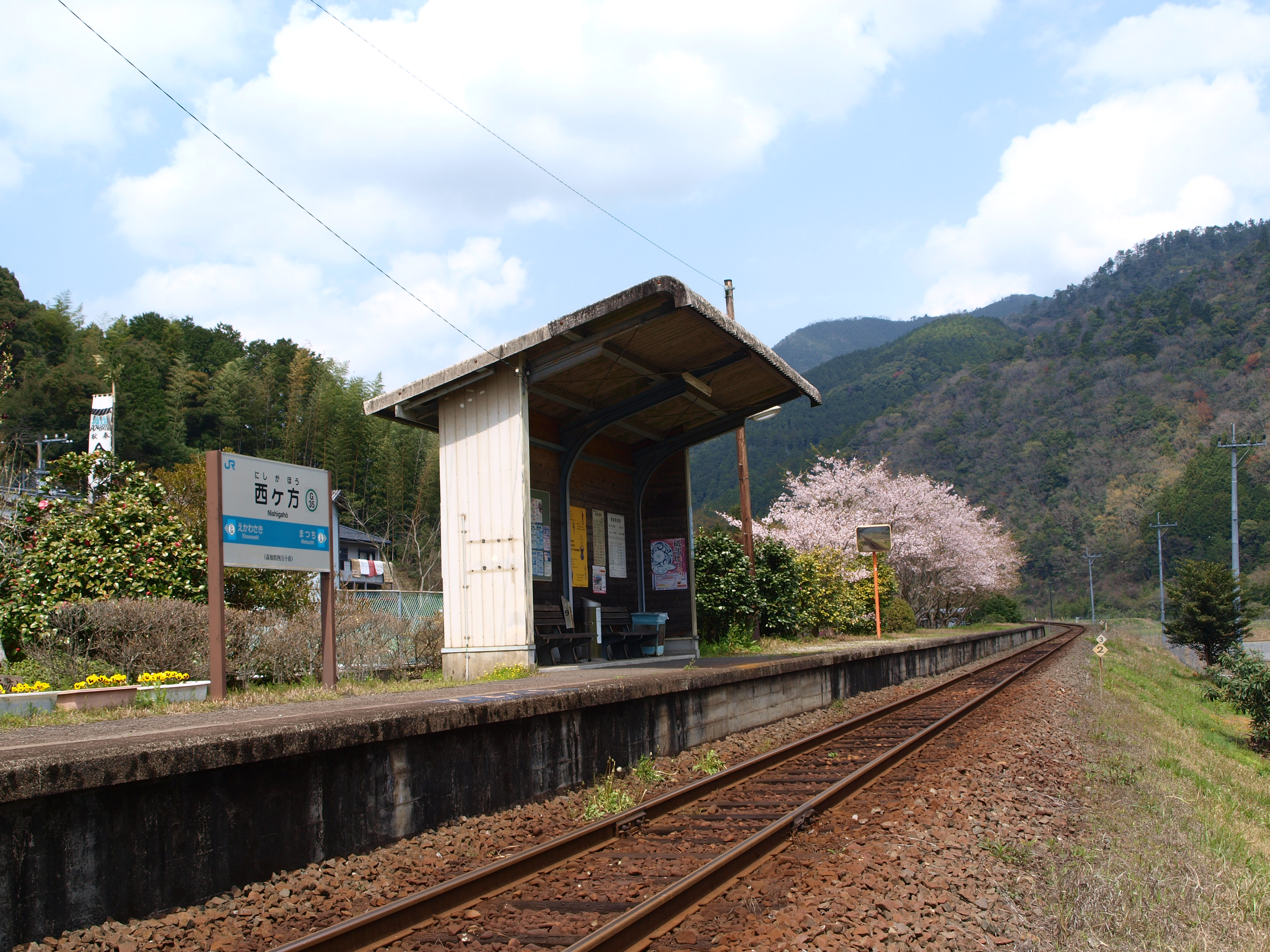
- Platform of Nishigahō Station in 2010

General information
- Location: Nishitosanishigahō, Shimanto-shi, Kōchi-ken 787-1602; Japan
- Coordinates: 33°11′14″N 132°46′02″E
- Operator: JR Shikoku
- Line: ■ Yodo Line
- Distance: 45.4 km from Wakai
- Platforms: 1 side platform
- Tracks: 1

Construction
- Parking: Available
- Cycle facilities: Bike shed
- Accessible: Yes - ramp leads up to platform

Other information
- Status: unstaffed
- Station code: G35

History
- Opened: 26 March 1953

Passengers
- FY2018: 10
Location
- Location within Kochi Prefecture Location within Japan

Nishigahō Station (西ヶ方駅, Nishigahō-eki) is a passengerrailway station located in the city of Shimanto, Kōchi Prefecture, Japan. It is operated by JR Shikoku and has the station number "G35".

== Lines ==
Nishigahō Station is served by JR Shikoku's Yodo Line, and is 45.4 kilometers from the starting point of then line at Wakai.

== Layout ==
The station, which is unstaffed, consists of a side platform serving a single track. There is no station building, only a shelter for waiting passengers. A ramp leads up from the access road to the platform. There is a toilet building next to the ramp and a bike shed is located across the access road.

== Adjacent stations ==
«	Service	»
JR Shikoku
Yodo Line
Ekawasaki	-	Matsuchi

== History ==
The station opened on 26 March 1953 under the control of Japanese National Railways. After the privatization of JNR on 1 April 1987, control of the station passed to JR Shikoku.

== Surrounding area ==
- Shimanto Municipal Nishigakata Elementary School
- Hiromi River

== See also ==
- List of railway stations in Japan
