= Hata District, Kōchi =

District in Kōchi Prefecture, Japan

Coordinates: 32.889°N 132.844°E

Hata (幡多郡, Hata-gun) is a district located in Kōchi Prefecture, Japan.

As of the Shimanto merger but with 2003 population statistics, the district has an estimated population of 22,402 and a density of 59.4 persons per km^{2}. The total area is 376.77 km^{2}.

== Towns and villages ==
- Kuroshio
- Ōtsuki
- Mihara

== Mergers ==
- On April 10, 2005 the old city of Nakamura, and the village of Nishitosa merged to form the new city of Shimanto.
- On March 20, 2006 the towns of Taishō and Towa merged with the town of Kubokawa, from Takaoka District, to form the new town of Shimanto, in Takaoka District.
- On March 20, 2006 the towns of Ōgata and Saga merged to form the new town of Kuroshio.
