= Kubokawa, Kōchi =

Dissolved municipality in Kōchi prefecture, Japan

Kubokawa (窪川町, Kubokawa-chō) was a town located in Takaoka District, Kōchi Prefecture, Japan.

As of 2003, the town had an estimated population of 14,385 and a density of 51.73 persons per km^{2}. The total area was 278.08 km^{2}.

On March 20, 2006, Kubokawa, along with the towns of Taishō and Towa (both Hata District), was merged to create the town of Shimanto (in Takaoka District) and no longer exists as in independent municipality.
