= Tōwa, Kōchi =

Dissolved municipality in Kōchi prefecture, Japan

Tōwa (十和村, Tōwa-son) was a village located in Hata District, Kōchi Prefecture, Japan.

As of 2003, the village had an estimated population of 3,399 and a density of 20.64 persons per km^{2}. The total area was 164.66 km^{2}.

On March 20, 2006, Tōwa, along with the town of Kubokawa (from Takaoka District), and the town of Taishō (also from Hata District), was merged to create the town of Shimanto (in Takaoka District) and no longer exists as in independent municipality.
