= Ōnomi, Kōchi =

Dissolved municipality in Kōchi prefecture, Japan

Coordinates: 33.336°N 133.141°E

Ōnomi (大野見村, Ōnomi-son) was a village located in Takaoka District, Kōchi Prefecture, Japan.

As of 2003, the village had an estimated population of 1,602 and a density of 15.95 persons per km^{2}. The total area was 100.41 km^{2}.

On January 1, 2006, Ōnomi was merged into the expanded town of Nakatosa.
