= Taishō, Kōchi =

Dissolved municipality in Kōchi prefecture, Japan

Taishō (大正町, Taishō-chō) was a town located in Hata District, Kōchi Prefecture, Japan.

As of 2003, the town had an estimated population of 3,240 and a density of 16.26 persons per km^{2}. The total area was 199.32 km^{2}.

On March 20, 2006, Taishō, along with the town of Kubokawa (from Takaoka District), and the town of Towa (also from Hata District), was merged to create the town of Shimanto (in Takaoka District) and no longer exists as in independent municipality.
