= Shimanto, Kōchi (city) =

Shimanto 四万十市
- City
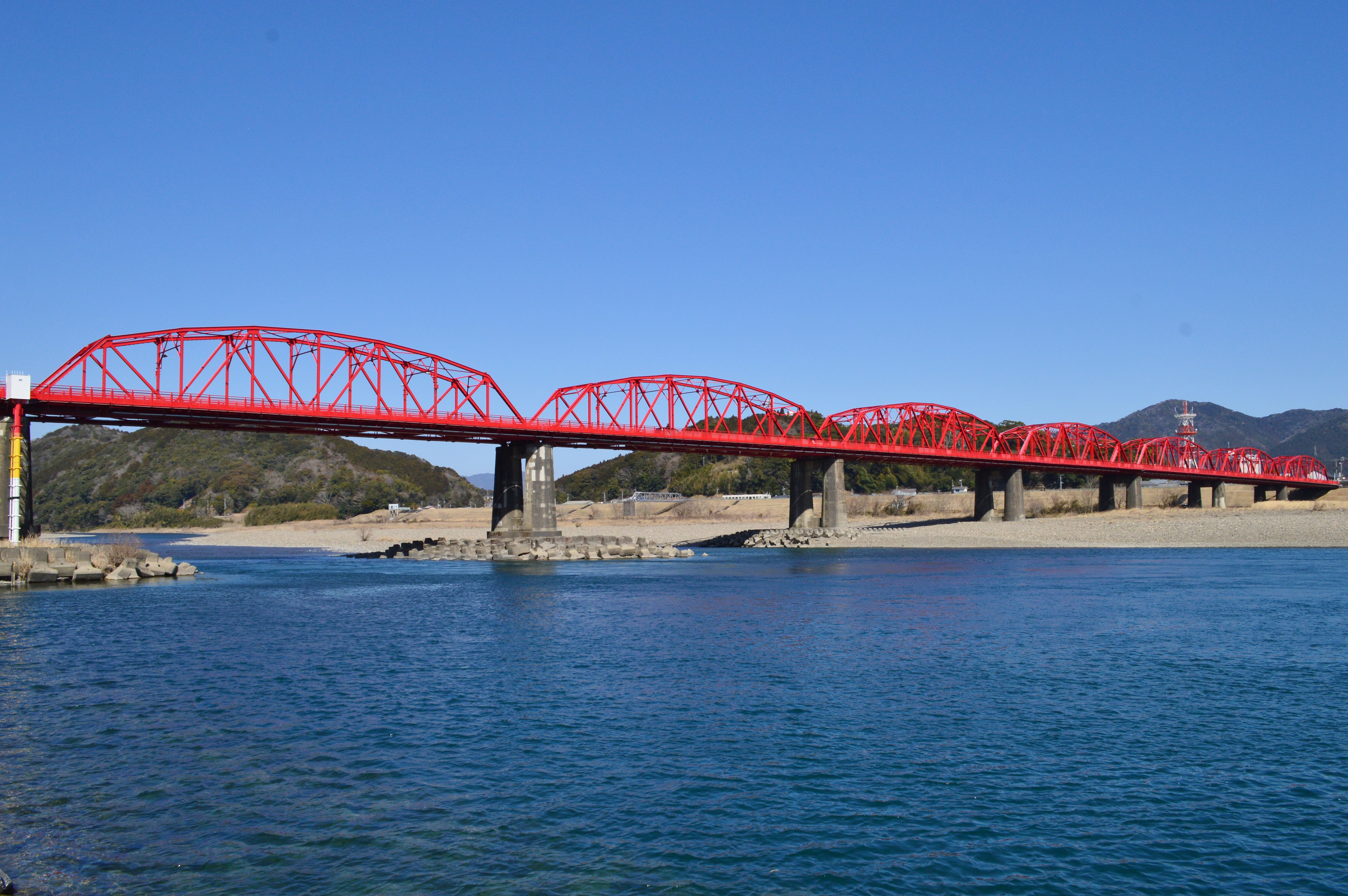
- Shimanto River

- Flag Emblem

- Location of Shimanto in Kōchi Prefecture

- Location in Japan
- Coordinates: 33°0′N 132°56′E
- Country: Japan
- Region: Shikoku
- Prefecture: Kōchi

Government
  - Mayor: Genichirō Yamashita (from 15 May, 2025)

Area
  - Total: 632.29 km^{2} (244.13 sq mi)

Population (31 July 2022)
  - Total: 32,593
  - Density: 51.548/km^{2} (133.51/sq mi)
- Time zone: UTC+09:00 (JST)
- City hall address: 4-10 Nakamura Ōhashi-dōri, Shimanto-shi, Kōchi-ken 783-8501
- Climate: Cfa
- Website: Official website
- Symbols
- Bird: Common kingfisher
- Fish: Ayu
- Flower: Wisteria
- Tree: Willow

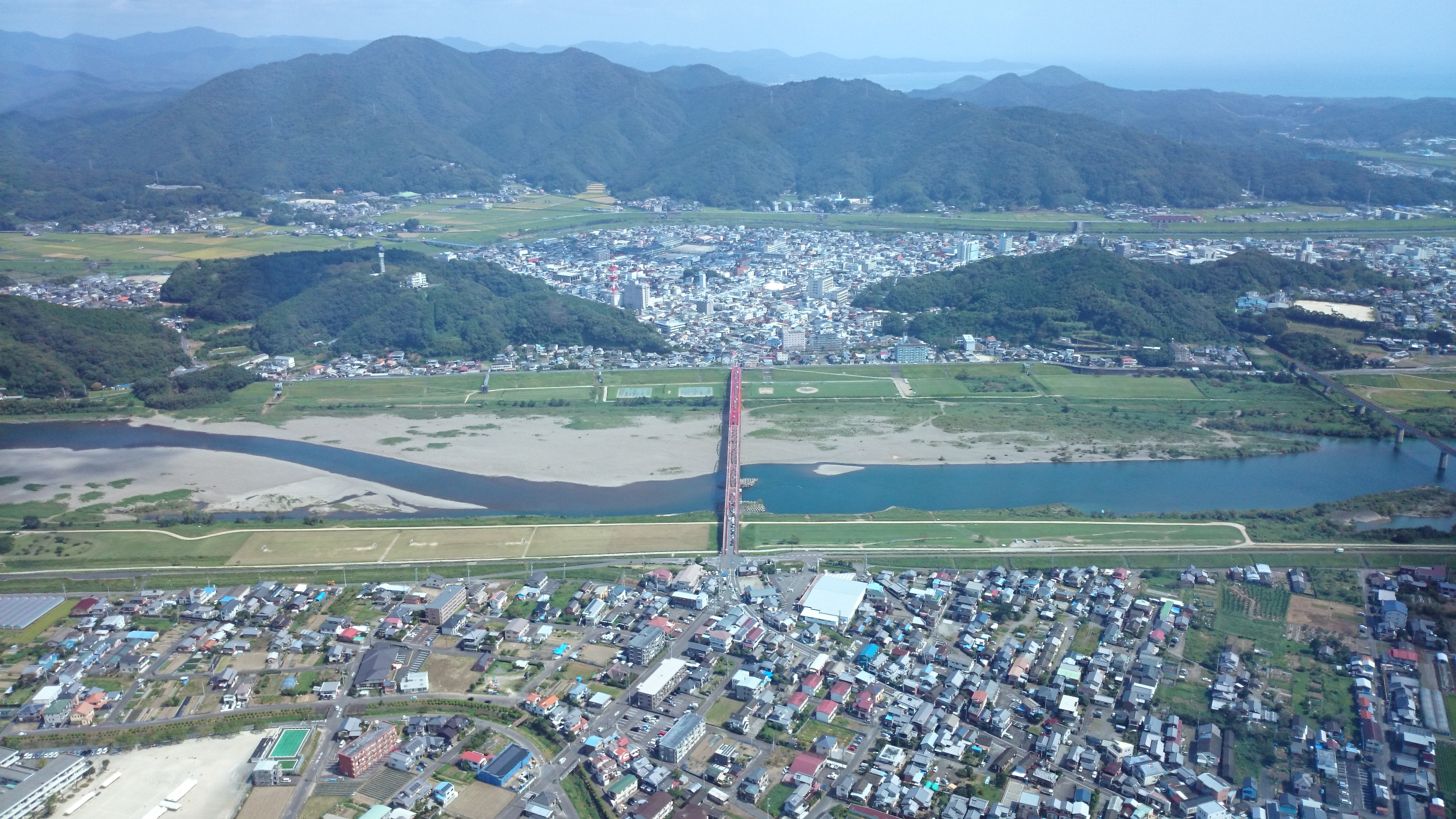
View of Shimanto city

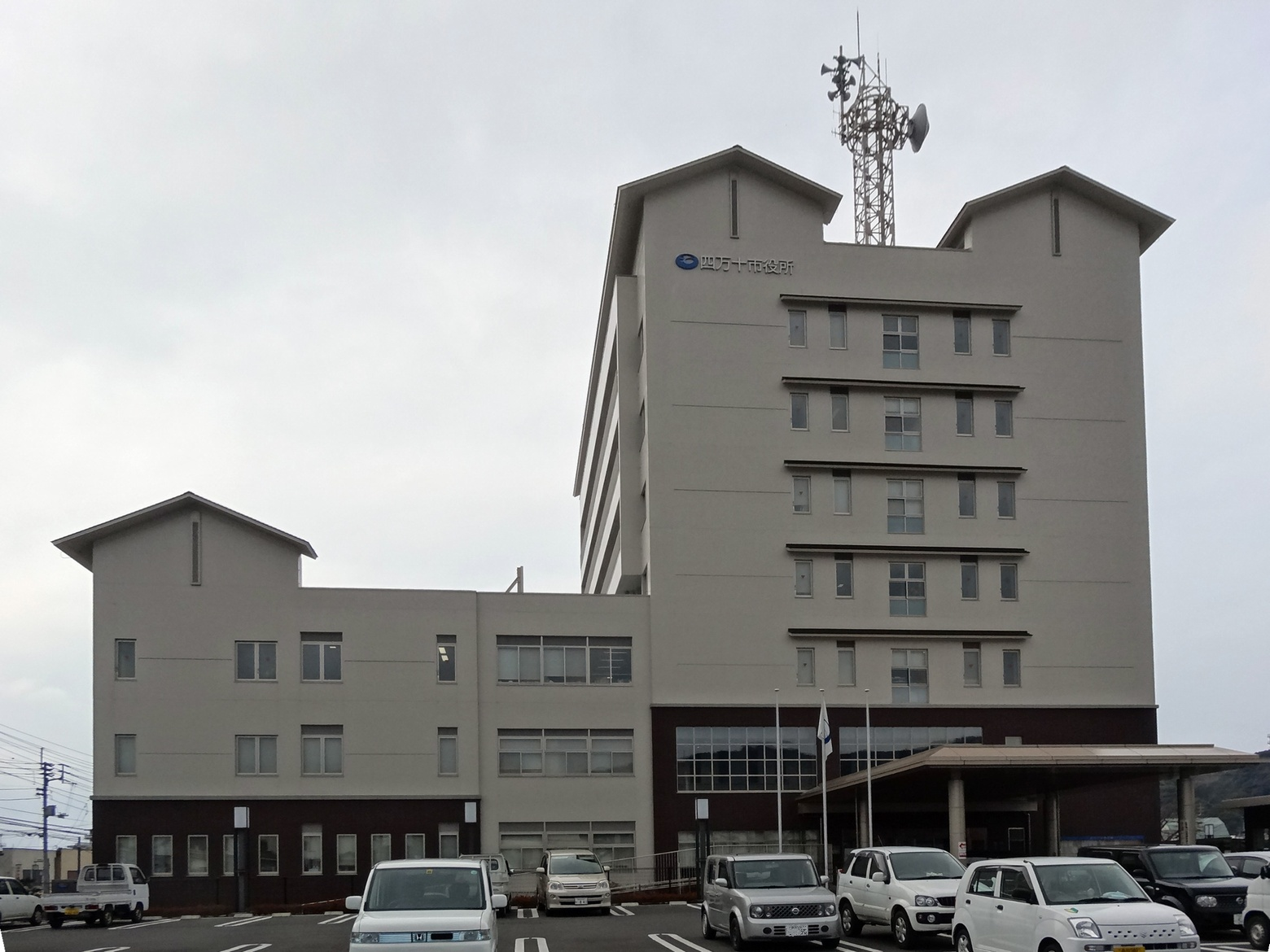
Shimanto City Hall

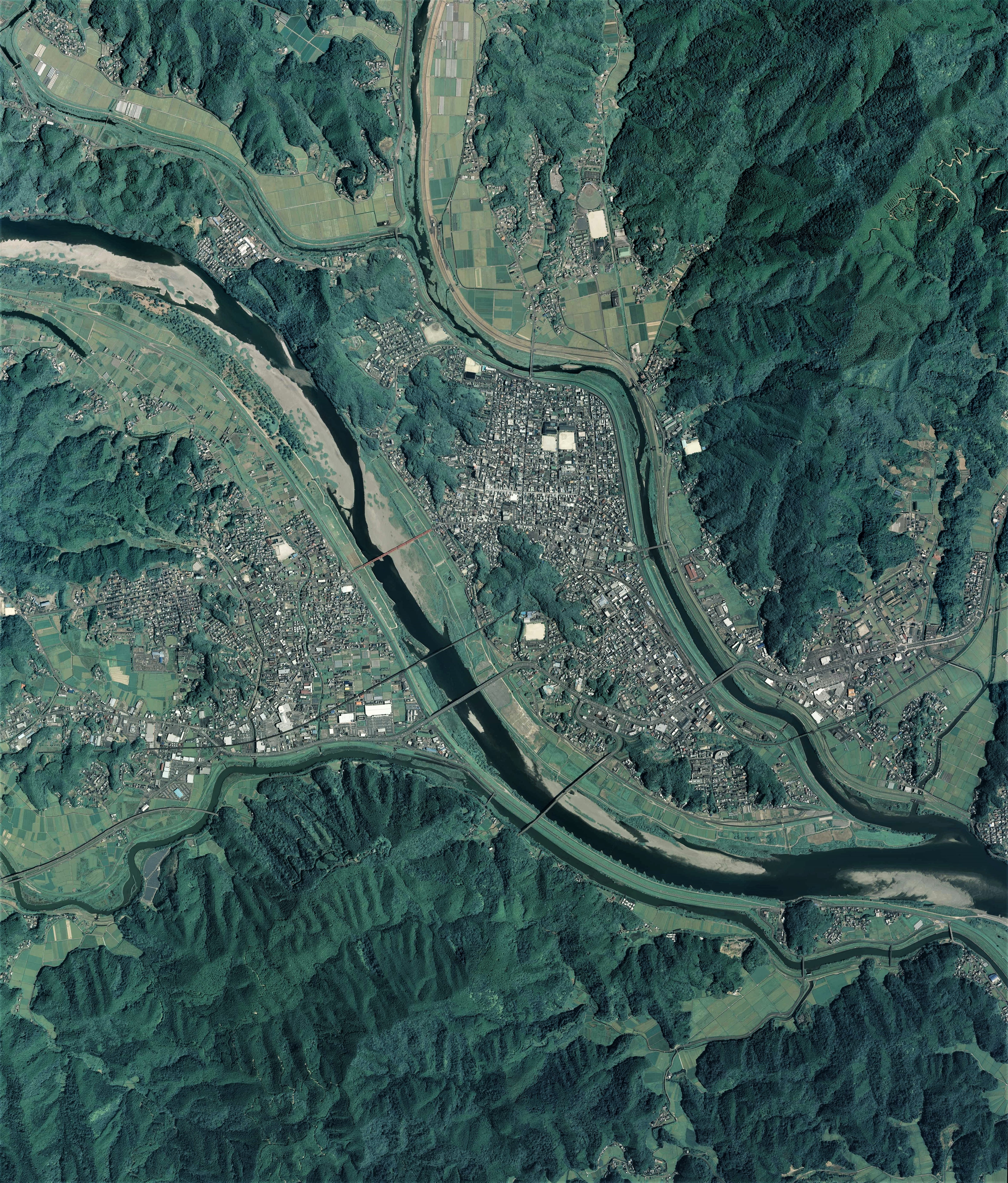
Aerial view of Nakamura neighborhood of Shimanto

Shimanto (四万十市, Shimanto-shi) is a city in southwestern Kōchi Prefecture, Japan. As of 31 July 2022, the city had an estimated population of 32,593 in 16635 households, and a population density of 52 persons per km^{2}. The total area of the city is 632.29 square kilometres (244.13 sq mi).

== Geography ==
Shimanto is located in southwestern Kōchi Prefecture. Both the Shimanto River and the Ushirogawa River run through the city. River levels often rise in summer and autumn due to the rainy season and seasonal typhoons. Shimanto's population is spread across a large area, broken up by rivers, mountains and uninhabited or sparsely inhabited areas.

=== Neighbouring municipalities ===
- Ehime Prefecture
  - Matsuno
  - Uwajima
- Kōchi Prefecture
  - Kuroshio
  - Mihara
  - Shimanto
  - Sukumo
  - Tosashimizu

=== Climate ===
Shimanto has a wet subtropical climate (Köppen climate classification Cfa) with hot humid summers and cool to cold winters. Humidity levels are high during the hot summer months. Snow is rare and occurs only once or twice in a year. Rainfall is significant throughout the year, but heavier during the rainy season in June and July, and also in September, when a large number of typhoons hit Japan.

On August 12, 2013, Shimanto recorded a temperature of 41.0 °C (105.8 °F), the highest ever recorded in Japan, until that was broken by a reading of 41.1 °C (106.0 °F), recorded in both Kumagaya and Hamamatsu, on July 23, 2018, and August 17, 2020, respectively.

Climate data for Nakamura, Shimanto (1991−2020 normals, extremes 1976−present)
Month	Jan	Feb	Mar	Apr	May	Jun	Jul	Aug	Sep	Oct	Nov	Dec	Year
Record high °C (°F)	21.4 (70.5)	24.4 (75.9)	27.4 (81.3)	30.5 (86.9)	34.0 (93.2)	35.1 (95.2)	39.5 (103.1)	40.1 (104.2)	36.9 (98.4)	33.4 (92.1)	28.0 (82.4)	23.4 (74.1)	40.1 (104.2)
Mean daily maximum °C (°F)	11.6 (52.9)	13.0 (55.4)	16.3 (61.3)	21.1 (70.0)	25.1 (77.2)	27.1 (80.8)	31.5 (88.7)	32.4 (90.3)	29.4 (84.9)	24.7 (76.5)	19.2 (66.6)	13.8 (56.8)	22.1 (71.8)
Daily mean °C (°F)	5.9 (42.6)	7.1 (44.8)	10.5 (50.9)	15.2 (59.4)	19.4 (66.9)	22.6 (72.7)	26.6 (79.9)	27.3 (81.1)	24.1 (75.4)	18.8 (65.8)	13.1 (55.6)	7.8 (46.0)	16.5 (61.8)
Mean daily minimum °C (°F)	0.7 (33.3)	1.7 (35.1)	4.8 (40.6)	9.5 (49.1)	14.3 (57.7)	18.7 (65.7)	22.8 (73.0)	23.4 (74.1)	20.2 (68.4)	14.0 (57.2)	7.9 (46.2)	2.7 (36.9)	11.7 (53.1)
Record low °C (°F)	−6.9 (19.6)	−10.4 (13.3)	−4.5 (23.9)	−0.7 (30.7)	3.9 (39.0)	10.7 (51.3)	14.2 (57.6)	16.0 (60.8)	9.7 (49.5)	2.4 (36.3)	−2.3 (27.9)	−5.3 (22.5)	−10.4 (13.3)
Average precipitation mm (inches)	91.3 (3.59)	116.9 (4.60)	189.9 (7.48)	212.5 (8.37)	262.8 (10.35)	418.2 (16.46)	317.6 (12.50)	335.5 (13.21)	438.7 (17.27)	260.1 (10.24)	137.4 (5.41)	97.2 (3.83)	2,877.9 (113.30)
Average precipitation days (≥ 1.0 mm)	8.4	8.8	11.4	10.4	10.6	15.0	12.4	12.5	13.1	9.0	8.2	8.1	127.9
Mean monthly sunshine hours	170.8	164.2	186.0	194.5	189.3	126.2	185.3	206.8	155.6	173.7	162.0	169.2	2,083.6
Source: Japan Meteorological Agency

Climate data for Ekawasaki, Shimanto (1991−2020 normals, extremes 1977−present)
Month	Jan	Feb	Mar	Apr	May	Jun	Jul	Aug	Sep	Oct	Nov	Dec	Year
Record high °C (°F)	21.7 (71.1)	24.9 (76.8)	27.5 (81.5)	31.5 (88.7)	34.3 (93.7)	36.5 (97.7)	39.8 (103.6)	41.0 (105.8)	37.3 (99.1)	33.2 (91.8)	29.7 (85.5)	23.8 (74.8)	41.0 (105.8)
Mean daily maximum °C (°F)	10.2 (50.4)	11.7 (53.1)	15.5 (59.9)	20.9 (69.6)	25.2 (77.4)	27.4 (81.3)	31.6 (88.9)	32.7 (90.9)	29.2 (84.6)	24.0 (75.2)	18.1 (64.6)	12.4 (54.3)	21.6 (70.9)
Daily mean °C (°F)	4.9 (40.8)	5.9 (42.6)	9.3 (48.7)	14.2 (57.6)	18.7 (65.7)	22.1 (71.8)	26.1 (79.0)	26.7 (80.1)	23.4 (74.1)	17.8 (64.0)	12.1 (53.8)	6.8 (44.2)	15.7 (60.2)
Mean daily minimum °C (°F)	0.5 (32.9)	1.0 (33.8)	4.0 (39.2)	8.5 (47.3)	13.3 (55.9)	18.3 (64.9)	22.3 (72.1)	22.9 (73.2)	19.7 (67.5)	13.8 (56.8)	7.9 (46.2)	2.6 (36.7)	11.2 (52.2)
Record low °C (°F)	−6.0 (21.2)	−7.0 (19.4)	−5.0 (23.0)	−1.7 (28.9)	3.4 (38.1)	8.9 (48.0)	14.6 (58.3)	14.9 (58.8)	9.4 (48.9)	2.7 (36.9)	−1.8 (28.8)	−6.9 (19.6)	−7.0 (19.4)
Average precipitation mm (inches)	71.2 (2.80)	94.2 (3.71)	151.3 (5.96)	166.6 (6.56)	204.9 (8.07)	355.2 (13.98)	347.5 (13.68)	316.8 (12.47)	361.6 (14.24)	168.5 (6.63)	103.1 (4.06)	83.1 (3.27)	2,423.7 (95.42)
Average precipitation days (≥ 1.0 mm)	9.6	9.4	11.9	10.2	10.1	14.4	12.6	11.7	11.6	8.5	8.7	9.8	128.5
Mean monthly sunshine hours	139.2	145.7	173.2	185.7	183.6	120.2	171.0	192.3	144.6	166.1	146.7	131.5	1,909.3
Source: Japan Meteorological Agency

== Demographics ==
Per Japanese census data, the population of Shimanto in 2020 is 32,694 people. Shimanto has been conducting censuses since 1960.

Historical population
Year	Pop.	±%
1960	47,420	—
1965	42,667	−10.0%
1970	39,379	−7.7%
1975	39,614	+0.6%
1980	40,315	+1.8%
1985	40,609	+0.7%
1990	40,066	−1.3%
1995	38,991	−2.7%
2000	38,784	−0.5%
2005	37,917	−2.2%
2010	35,933	−5.2%
2015	34,313	−4.5%
2020	32,694	−4.7%
Shimanto population statistics

== History ==
As with all of Kōchi Prefecture, the area of Shimanto City was part of ancient Tosa Province. During the Kofun period and Nara period, the area of western Tosa was called "Hata" and was ruled by the Hata Kuni no miyatsuko. The Hata clan dominated the area well into the Heian period. During the Kamakura period much of the area became part of a vast shōen landed estate controlled by the Kujō family of aristocrats from Kyoto. Kujō Michiie left the estate to his third son, Ichijō Sanetsune, who was the founding father of Ichijō family. During the Onin War, the kanpaku Ichijō Norifusa fled Kyoto in 1468 and settled in Nakamura, in what is now Shimanto. He remodeled the village on Kyoto, giving rise to the nickname of "the little Kyoto of Tosa", During the Sengoku period, the Ichijō were defeated by the Chōsokabe clan at the 1575 Battle of Shimantogawa. Following the establishment of the Tokugawa shogunate, the area was part of the holdings of Tosa Domain ruled by the Yamauchi clan from their seat at Kōchi Castle, with Nakamura becoming the seat of a 30,000 koku subsidiary domain until 1689. In this year, the head of the Nakamura fief was punished for the offence of turning down a post on the Tokugawa Junior Council. The local castle was destroyed, the fief's finances were confiscated, retainers were stripped of their incomes, and the samurai dwellings were destroyed, forcing them to scatter and become farmers or merchants. The Nakamura area lost a great deal of wealth and independence, and became a minor rural region.

Following the Meiji restoration, the village of Nakamura was established within Hata District, Kōchi with the creation of the modern municipalities system on October 1, 1889, and was raised to town status on November 10, 1898. The area was almost entirely destroyed by the 1946 Nankai earthquake, as a result of which very few historical buildings remain. Photographs of the area after the earthquake can be seen in the city museum. On March 31, 1954, Nakamura merged with ten neighboring villages and was raised to city status. The city of Shimanto was established on April 10, 2005, from the merger of the city of Nakamura, and the village of Nishitosa (from Hata District).

== Government ==
Shimanto has a mayor-council form of government with a directly elected mayor and a unicameral city council of 20 members. Shimanto contributes two members to the Kōchi Prefectural Assembly. In terms of national politics, the city is part of Kōchi 2nd district of the lower house of the Diet of Japan.

=== Districts ===
Shimanto city is divided into thirteen districts.

- Ekawasaki (江川崎地区)
- Gudō (具同地区)
- Higashi-nakasuji (東中筋地区)
- Higashiyama (東山地区)
- Nakamura (中村地区)
- Nakasuji (中筋地区)
- Okawasuji (大川筋地区)
- Shimoda (下田地区)
- Toyama (富山地区)
- Tsuō (津大地区)
- Ushirogawa (後ろ川地区)
- Warabioka (蕨岡地区)
- Yatsuka (八束地区)

The largest district is Nakamura, with a population of 9,352 residents as of November 2013. The smallest is Toyama, with 882 residents.

== Economy ==
The local economy is dominated by agriculture, forestry and commercial fishing, and tourism.

== Education ==
Shimanto City has 13 public elementary schools and four public middle schools operated by the town government, and one public middle school and three public high schools operated by the Kōchi Prefectural Board of Education. The prefecture also operates one special education school for the handicapped.

== Sister cities ==
The following cities were twinned with Nakamura before it became part of Shimanto.

=== Domestic ===
- (Japan) Betsukai, Hokkaido
- (Japan) Shionoe, Kagawa

=== International ===
- Bozhou, Anhui, China

== Transportation ==
=== Railway ===
Shikoku Railway Company - Yodo Line

- Hage - Ekawasaki - Nishigahō

Tosa Kuroshio Railway Nakamura Line

- Nakamura - Kotsuka

Tosa Kuroshio Railway Sukumo Line

- Gudō - Kunimi - Arioka

=== Highway ===
- National Route 56
- National Route 439
- National Route 441

== Notable people from Shimanto ==
- Masato Honda (1962-), saxophone player, composer, and multi-instrumentalist well known for being T-Square saxophonist from 1991 until 1997.
- Shūsui Kōtoku (1871-1911), radical journalist who played a key role in introducing anarchism to Japan in the early 20th century, executed for treason
- Torahiko Miyahata (1903-1988), freestyle swimmer who represented Japan in the 1924 Summer Olympics
- Mayo Okamoto (1974-), pop singer-songwriter, whose 1995 debut single "Tomorrow" reached number 1 on the Oricon weekly single charts
