= Nakatosa =

Nakatosa 中土佐町
- Town
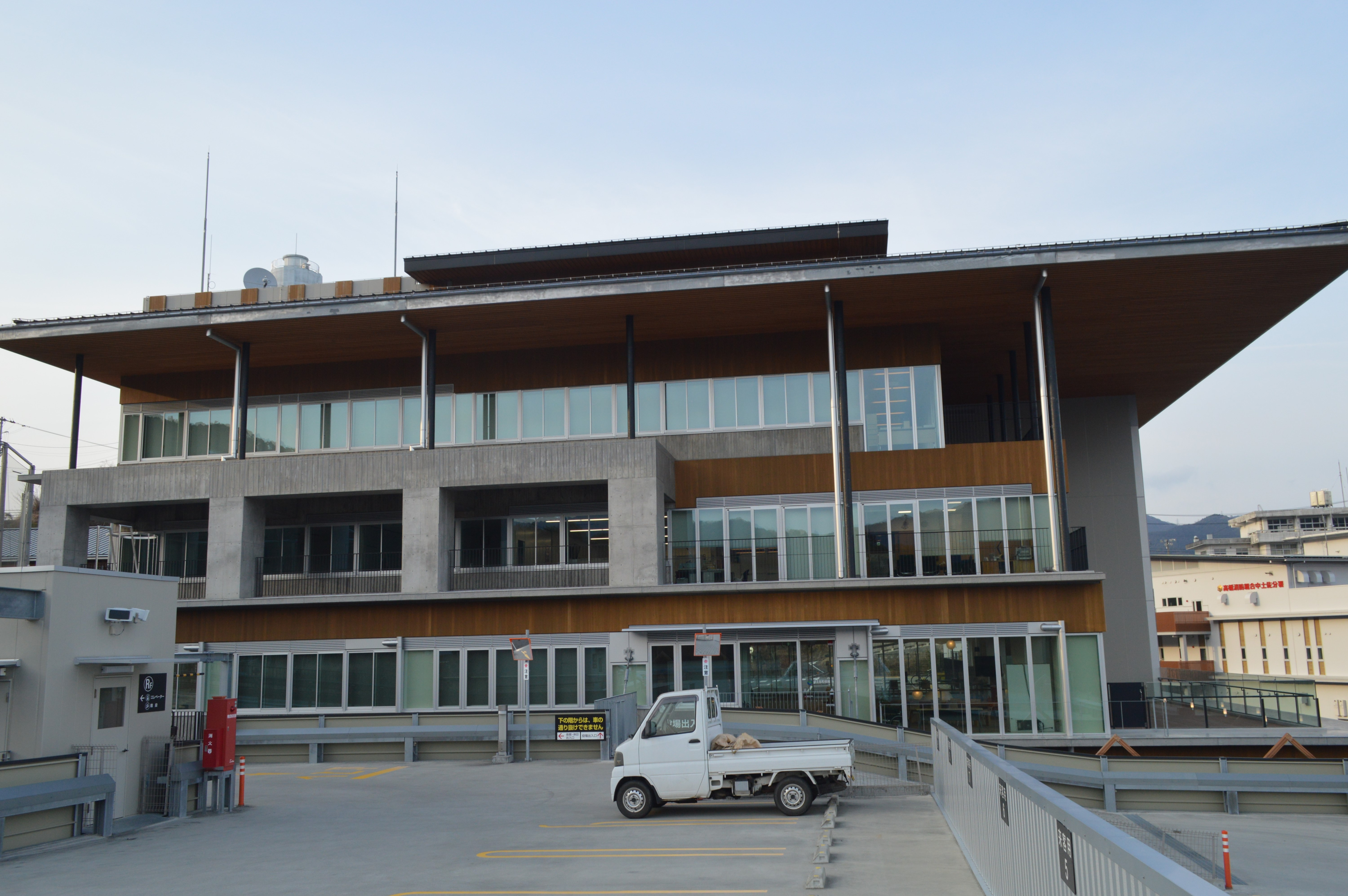
- Nakatosa town office

- Flag Chapter
- Location of Nakatosa in Kōchi Prefecture

- Location in Japan
- Coordinates: 33°19′40″N 133°13′40″E
- Country: Japan
- Region: Shikoku
- Prefecture: Kōchi
- District: Takaoka

Area
  - Total: 193.20 km^{2} (74.59 sq mi)

Population (July 31, 2022)
  - Total: 6,200
  - Density: 32/km^{2} (83/sq mi)
- Time zone: UTC+09:00 (JST)
- City hall address: 6663-1 Kure, Nakatosa-chō, Takaoka-gun, Kōchi-ken 789-1301
- Website: Official website
- Symbols
- Bird: Blue rock thrush
- Flower: Chrysanthemum japonense
- Tree: Magnolia compressa

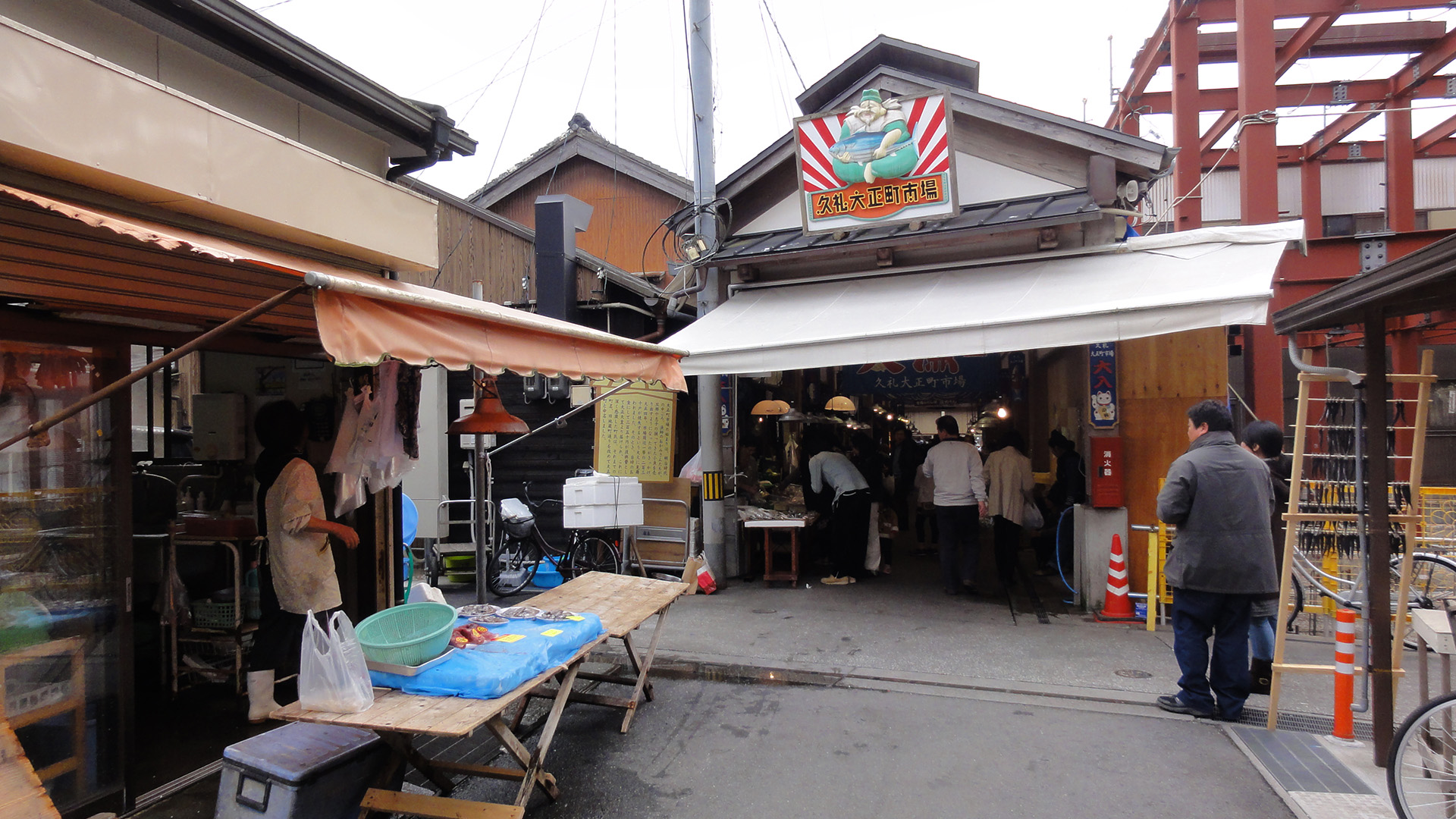
Kure Tasho-machi market

Nakatosa (中土佐町, Nakatosa-chō) is a town located in Takaoka District, Kōchi Prefecture, Japan. As of 31 July 2022, the town had an estimated population of 6,200 in 3363 households and a population density of 14 persons per km^{2}. The total area of the town is 193.20 square kilometres (74.59 sq mi).

== Geography ==
Nakatosa is located in the central part of Kōchi Prefecture, on the island of Shikoku, facing the Pacific Ocean to the east.

=== Neighbouring municipalities ===
Kōchi Prefecture

- Shimanto
- Susaki
- Tsuno

=== Climate ===
Nakatosa has a humid subtropical climate (Köppen Cfa) characterized by warm summers and cool winters with light snowfall. The average annual temperature in Nakatosa is 15.6 °C. The average annual rainfall is 2533 mm with September as the wettest month. The temperatures are highest on average in August, at around 25.3 °C, and lowest in January, at around 5.5 °C.

== Demographics ==
Per Japanese census data, the population of Nakatosa has decreased steadily since the 1950s.

Historical population
Year	Pop.	±%
1920	11,888	—
1930	12,562	+5.7%
1940	12,922	+2.9%
1950	16,146	+24.9%
1960	14,184	−12.2%
1970	11,311	−20.3%
1980	10,753	−4.9%
1990	9,852	−8.4%
2000	8,722	−11.5%
2010	7,605	−12.8%
2020	6,002	−21.1%

== History ==
As with all of Kōchi Prefecture, the area of Nakatosa was part of ancient Tosa Province. During the Edo period, the area was part of the holdings of Tosa Domain ruled by the Yamauchi clan from their seat at Kōchi Castle. The villages of Kure (久礼) and Kaminokae (上ノ加江) and Nishibun (西分村) were established with the creation of the modern municipalities system on October 1, 1889. They were subsequently elevated to town status on June 12, 1901, and January 1, 1915, and merged on July 1, 1957, to form the town of Naktosa. On January 1, 2006, the village of Ōnomi, from Takaoka District, was merged into Nakatosa.

== Government ==
Nakatosa has a mayor-council form of government with a directly elected mayor and a unicameral town council of six members. Nakatosa, together with the municipalities of Shimanto, Tsuno and Yusuhara, contributes two members to the Kōchi Prefectural Assembly. In terms of national politics, the town is part of Kōchi 2nd district of the lower house of the Diet of Japan.

== Economy ==
The local economy is centered on horticulture and greenhouse farming, with commercial fishing playing a smaller role.

== Education ==
Nakatosa has two public elementary schools and three public middle schools operated by the town government. The town does not have a high school.

== Transportation ==
=== Railway ===
Shikoku Railway Company – Dosan Line

- Tosa-Kure

=== Highways ===
- Kōchi Expressway
- National Route 56}
