= Takaoka District, Kōchi =

District in Kōchi Prefecture, Japan

Coordinates: 33.337°N 133.08°E

Takaoka (高岡郡, Takaoka-gun) is a district located in Kōchi Prefecture, Japan.

As of the Shimanto merger but with 2003 population statistics, the district has an estimated population of 68,854 and a density of 45.1 persons per km^{2}. The total area is 1,527.65 square kilometres (589.83 sq mi).

== Towns and villages ==
- Nakatosa
- Ochi
- Sakawa
- Shimanto
- Tsuno
- Yusuhara
- Hidaka

== Geography ==
As with the majority of Kochi, the terrain in Takaoka is mostly mountainous. The Shimanto River, that disperses further west in the Hata district, has its source in Tsuno.

== Transport ==
Like most rural areas in Kochi, transport is limited for residents and visitors without private vehicles. The JR Dosan line that runs from Kochi passes through Hidaka, Sakawa and Kure (Nakatosa) on the way to Kubokawa (Shimanto Town). The other.

Local buses do operate within areas of Takaoka, such as a regular but infrequent set of routes servicing Sakawa, Ochi and Niyodogawa.

== Mergers ==
- On 1 February 2005 the villages of Hayama and Higashitsuno merged to form the new town of Tsuno.
- On 1 August 2005 the village of Niyodo merged with the town of Ikegawa, and the village of Agawa, both from Agawa District, to form the new town of Niyodogawa, in Agawa District.
- On 1 January 2006 the village of Ōnomi merged into the town of Nakatosa.
- On 20 March 2006 the town of Kubokawa merged with the towns of Taishō and Towa, both from Hata District, to form the new town of Shimanto, in Takaoka District.
