= Japan National Route 381 =

Road in Japan

National Route 381
- 国道381号
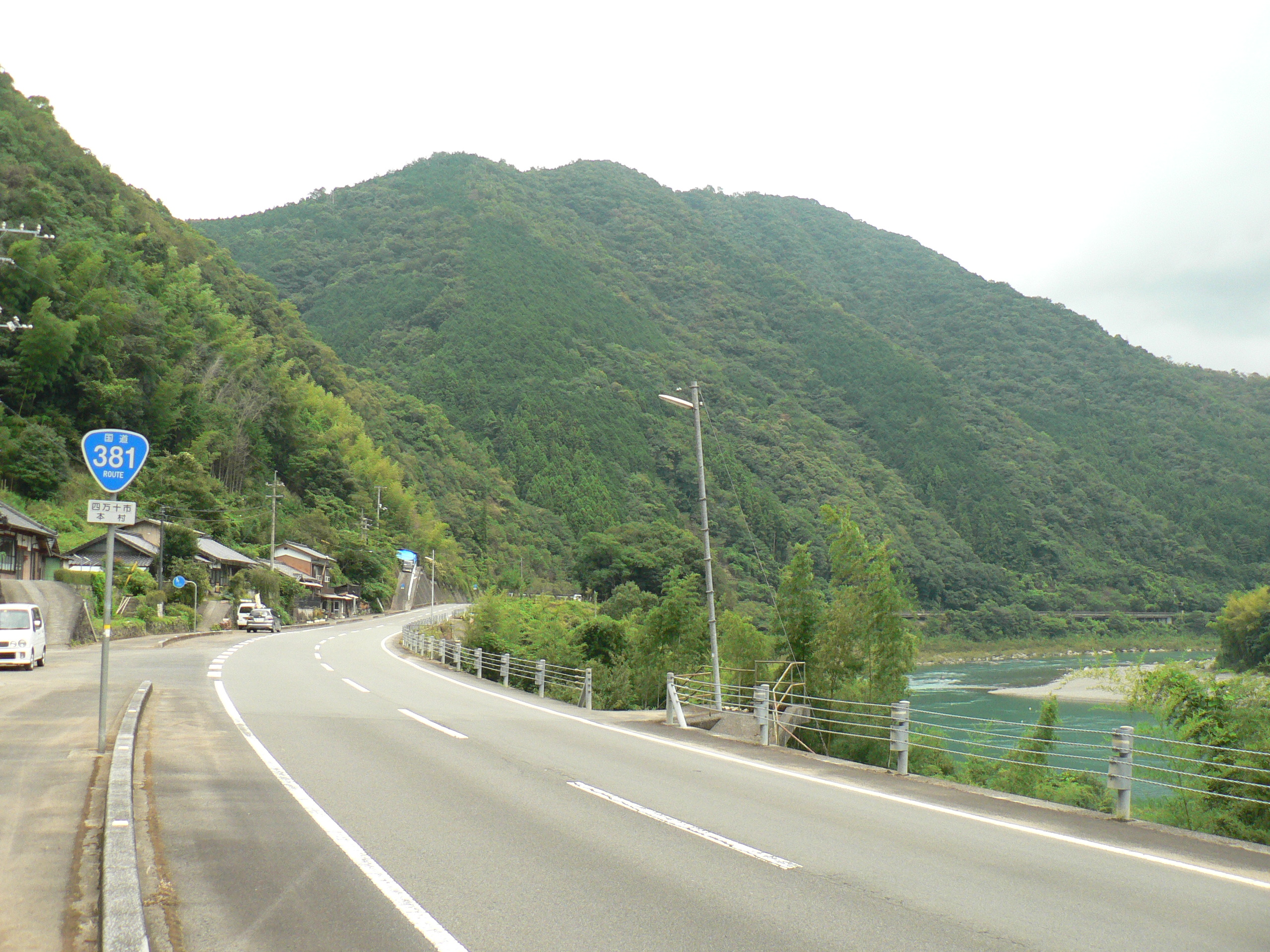

Route information
- Length: 115.6 km (71.8 mi)

Location
- Country: Japan

Highway system
- National highways of Japan; Expressways of Japan
← National Route 380	→ National Route 382

National Route 381 is a national highway of Japan connecting Susaki, Kōchi and Uwajima, Ehime on the island of Shikoku, with a total length of 115.6 km (71.83 mi).
