= Shimanto River =

River in Shikoku, Japan

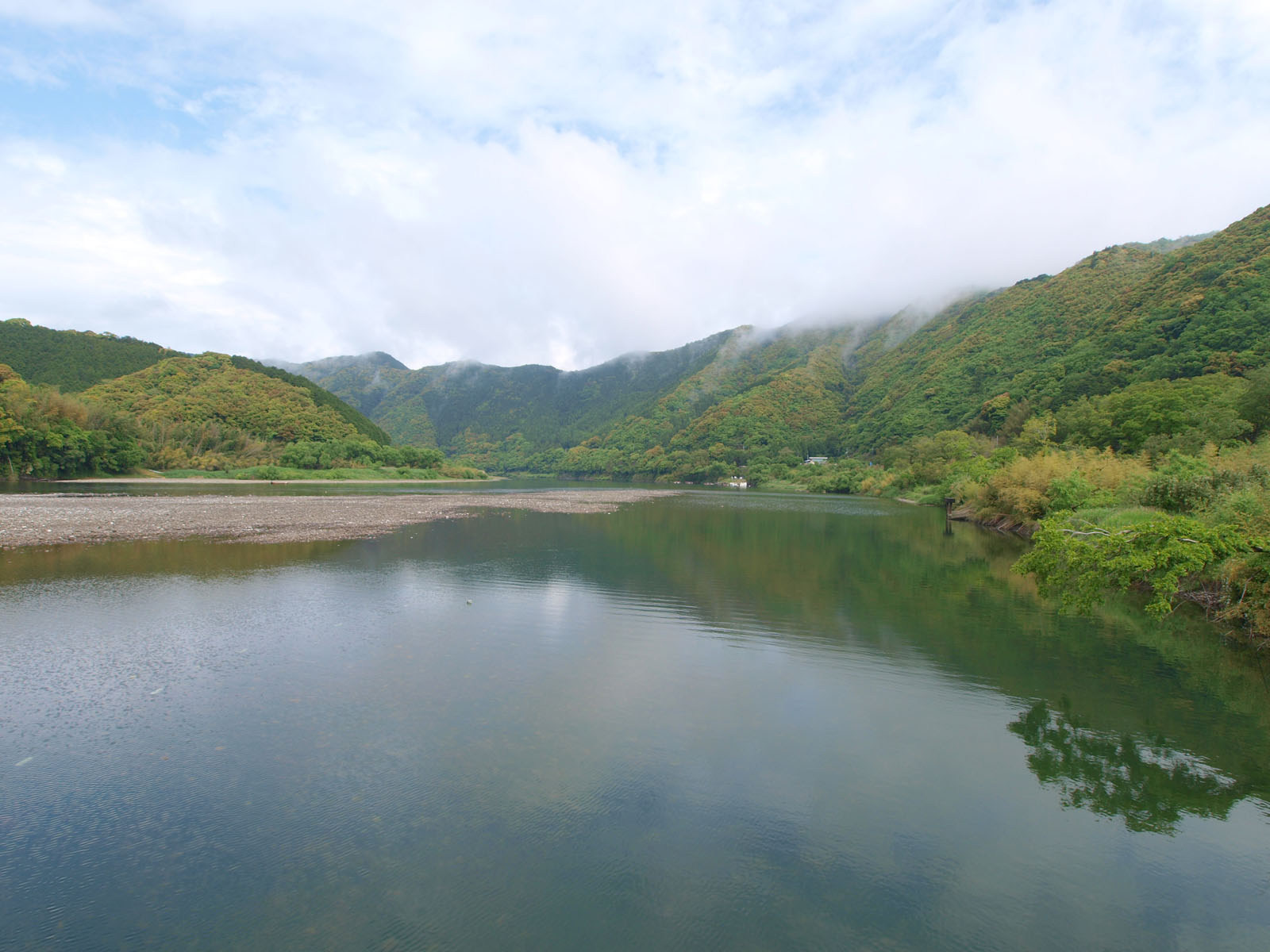
- The Shimanto River

- Native name: 四万十川 (Japanese)

Location
- Country: Japan

Physical characteristics
- Mouth
  - location: 32°56′02″N 132°59′45″E
- Length: 196 km (122 mi)

The Shimanto River (四万十川, Shimanto-gawa) is a Class A river in western Kōchi Prefecture, Japan. 196 km (122 mi) in length, it has a watershed of 2,270 km^{2} (880 sq mi).

== Fisheries ==
Since the river is remote from major cities and does not have any dams, it is sometimes referred to as "the last clear stream of Japan". Fishing and production of nori is a thriving industry along the river.

== Lack of dams ==
Due to lack of damming of the river, it has been named one of the "Three Free-Flowing Rivers in Japan", along with the Nagara River in Gifu Prefecture and the Kakita River in Shizuoka Prefecture.

== Sinking bridges ==
The river also has 47 chinkabashi (沈下橋, sinking bridges), including those on its tributaries. Chinkabashi are low-water crossings constructed without parapets in order not to be washed away by floods. The prefecture decided to preserve them as cultural heritage.

== See also ==
- Yoshino River, which has similar low water crossings
