= Mihara, Kōchi =

Mihara 三原村
- Village
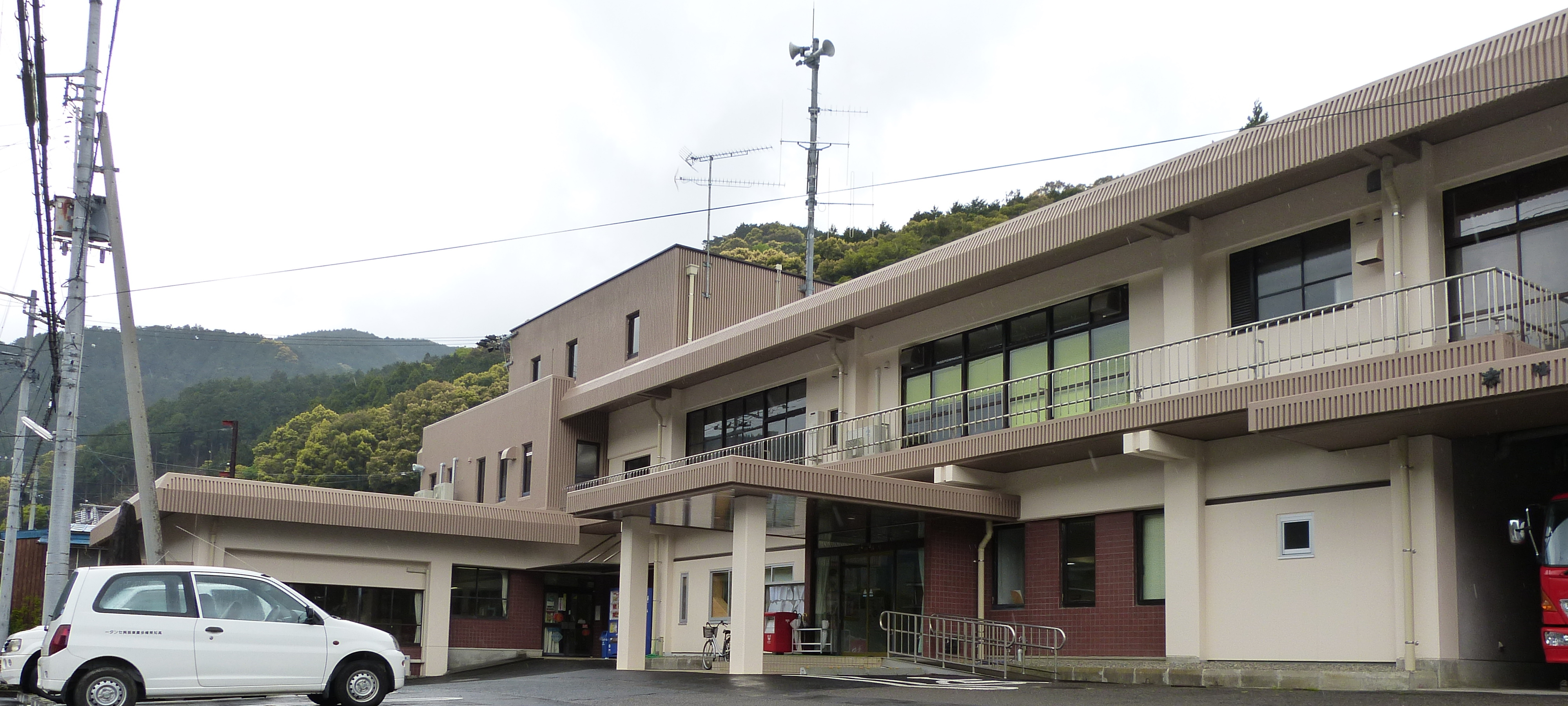
- Mihara village hall

- Flag Chapter
- Interactive map of Mihara
- Location in Japan
- Coordinates: 32°54′N 132°51′E
- Country: Japan
- Region: Shikoku
- Prefecture: Kōchi
- District: Hata

Government
  - Village Mayor: Tano Masatoshi
  - Deputy Mayor: Yano Tatsuyuki

Area
  - Total: 85.37 km^{2} (32.96 sq mi)

Population (April, 2025)
  - Total: 1,340
  - Density: 15.7/km^{2} (40.7/sq mi)
- Time zone: UTC+09:00 (JST)
- City hall address: 346 Kurusuno, Mihara-mura, Hata-gun, Kōchi-ken 787-0892
- Website: Official website
- Symbols
- Bird: Copper pheasant
- Flower: Rhododendron
- Tree: Chamaecyparis obtusa

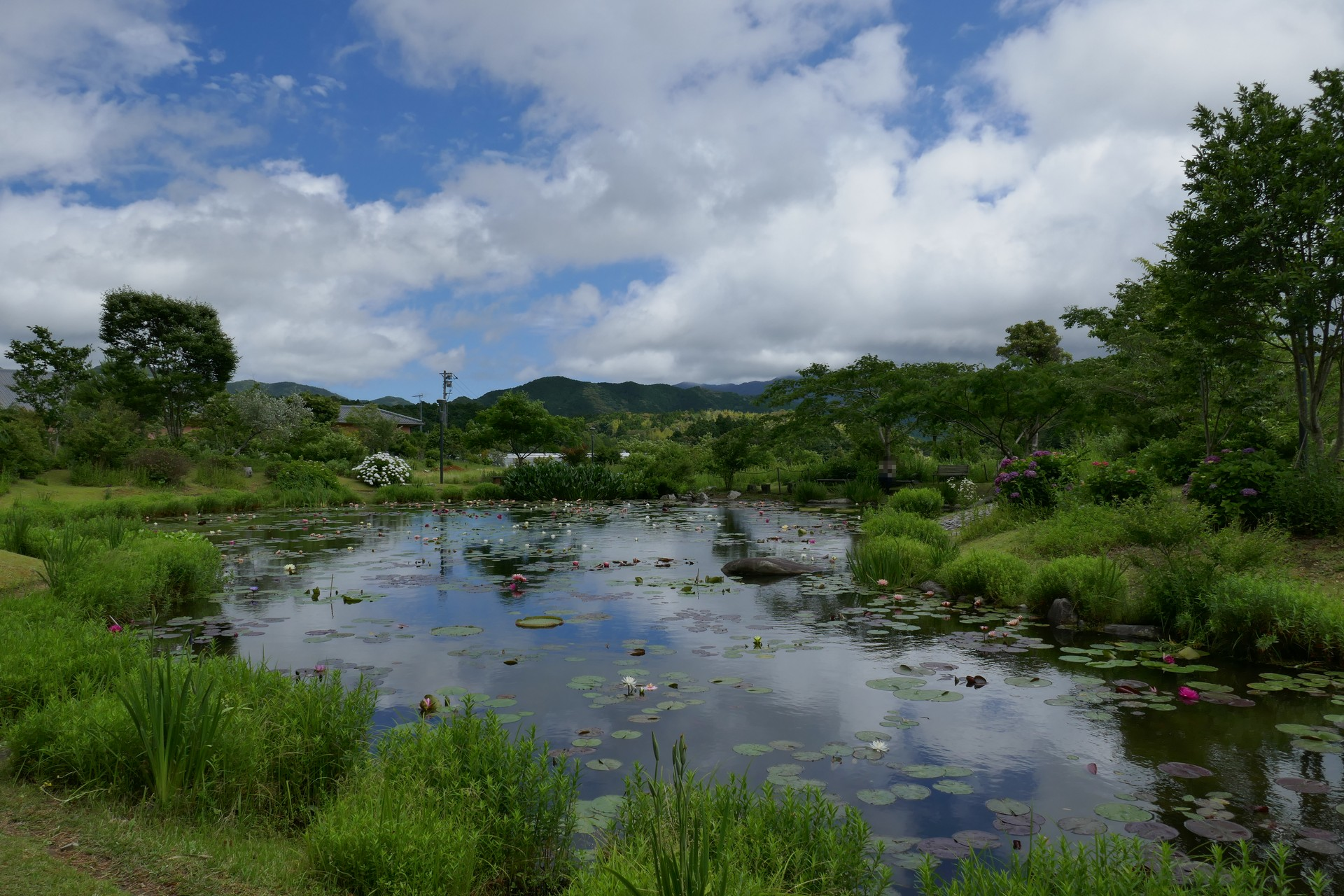
Hoshigaoka Park

Mihara (三原村, Mihara-mura) is a village located in Hata District, Kōchi Prefecture, Japan. As of 30 April 2025, the village had an estimated population of 1340 in 751 households and a population density of 17 persons per km^{2}. The total area of the village is 39.60 square kilometres (15.29 sq mi).

== Geography ==
Mihara is located in a mountainous region in western Kōchi Prefecture on the island of Shikoku. It is approximately 153 km from the Kōchi prefectural capital, Kōchi city. Surrounded by mountains of 450 to 850 meters, it is located independently of the neighboring three cities of Nakamura, Sukumo, and Tosashimizu. Most of the village is forest, and villages and cultivated land are scattered along the Shimonokae River and its tributaries.

=== Neighboring municipalities ===
Kōchi Prefecture

- Shimanto city
- Sukumo
- Tosashimizu

=== Climate ===
Mihara has a humid subtropical climate (Köppen Cfa) characterized by warm summers and cool winters with light snowfall. The average annual temperature in Mihara is 16.7 °C. The average annual rainfall is 2074 mm with September as the wettest month. The temperatures are highest on average in January at around 21.6 °C, and lowest in January, at around 7.0 °C.

=== Hamlets ===
Mihara is separated in different hamlets. The most populated places are Yunoki and Miyanokawa

- Shitagiri
- Kamenokawa
- Hirono
- Yunoki
- Miyanokawa
- Kurusuno
- Minao
- Yoshii
- Shimonagatani
- Kamishimonagatani
- Ōkamiuchi
- Naruyama
- Hoshigaoka

== Demographics ==
Per Japanese census data, the population of Mihara has decreased steadily since the 1960s.

Historical population
Year	Pop.	±%
1920	2,759	—
1930	2,865	+3.8%
1940	2,913	+1.7%
1950	3,665	+25.8%
1960	3,351	−8.6%
1970	2,427	−27.6%
1980	2,195	−9.6%
1990	2,005	−8.7%
2000	1,871	−6.7%
2010	1,681	−10.2%
2020	1,437	−14.5%
2025	1,354	−5.8%

== History ==
As with all of Kōchi Prefecture, the area of Mihara was part of ancient Tosa Province. During the Edo period, the area was part of the holdings of Tosa Domain ruled by the Yamauchi clan from their seat at Kōchi Castle. The village of Mihara was established with the creation of the modern municipalities system on October 1, 1889.

== Government ==
Mihara has a mayor-council form of government with a directly elected mayor and a unicameral village council of eight members. Mihara, together with Sukumo and Ōtsuki, contributes two members to the Kōchi Prefectural Assembly. In terms of national politics, the village is part of Kōchi 2nd district of the lower house of the Diet of Japan.

== Economy ==
The local economy is centered on forestry and agriculture. Mihara Village is surrounded by dense mountain forests and clear, pristine rivers providing ideal conditions for farming and agriculture. As a result, Mihara Village has become well known for its superior rice and vegetable produce.

== Education ==
Mihara has one public elementary school and one public middle school operated by the village government. The village does not have a high school.

== Transportation ==
=== Railway ===
Mihara has no passenger railway service. The nearest station is Hirata Station on the Tosa Kuroshio Railway Sukumo Line in the neighboring city of Sukumo.

=== Highway ===
Mihara is not on any national highway or expressway.

== Local attractions ==
Doburoku - Doburoku is a type of undistllled rice wine which is creamy in texture with a unique flavor and very potent. Although Doburoku is not exclusive to the village, Mihara is one of the few places that still produce doburoku. In addition, there is a Doburoku Festival held annually in Mihara on the 3rd of November.

Tosa Suzuri Factory - Mihara is also home to the Tosa Suzuri Factory. Suzuri (硯) is the Japanese word for the inkstone used for Japanese calligraphy or shodō (書道). Tosa Ink stones have a strong reputation nationwide for producing a high quality Ink and are sought after by calligraphers all over Japan.

Hoshigaoka Park - Hoshigaoka park is one of the main places for tourism in the village. It is home to many different endangered species of flowers such as himenobotan (Osbeckia chinensis). Other flowers you can see there are water lilies, golden lace (Patrinia scabiosifolia) and many more. Blue bees (Thyreus decorus) have been seen to appear here in the summer.

== Festivals ==
Mihara has many different traditional festivals throughout the year. There are autumn festivals danced every year which include their own village dance.

=== Doburoku Festival ===
The Doburoku festival is Mihara's most popular festival that attracts thousands of people every Autumn on the 3rd of November. It involves many different stores selling their own doburoku and other different stores. There is also a speed drinking competition, a kinako bread store, followed by a mochi throwing event at the end. It is held in the village community centre carpark.

=== Mihara Festival ===
Mihara festival is a summer festival held every year on the 15th of August. Obon dances, yosakoi and other traditional dances are performed by the village people. An amateur arm wrestling competition is held for kids and there is also an exhibit that shows the ぉlocal dam. The festival is concluded with fireworks shot from the junior high school grounds.

=== Souja Festival ===
Souja festival is a traditional autumn festival every year that is held in front of the Gosha shrine. Here, many traditional dances such as sword dances, fan dances and many more, are danced.

=== Hydrangea Festival ===
Every year when hydrangeas are in full bloom, a hydrangea festival is held in the Kamishimonagatani hamlet.

== Notable people from Mihara ==
- Norio Takeuchi, politician
- Nomachi Kazuyoshi, photographer
