= Hirata Station (Kōchi) =

Railway station in Sukumo, Kōchi Prefecture, Japan

Hirata Station 平田駅
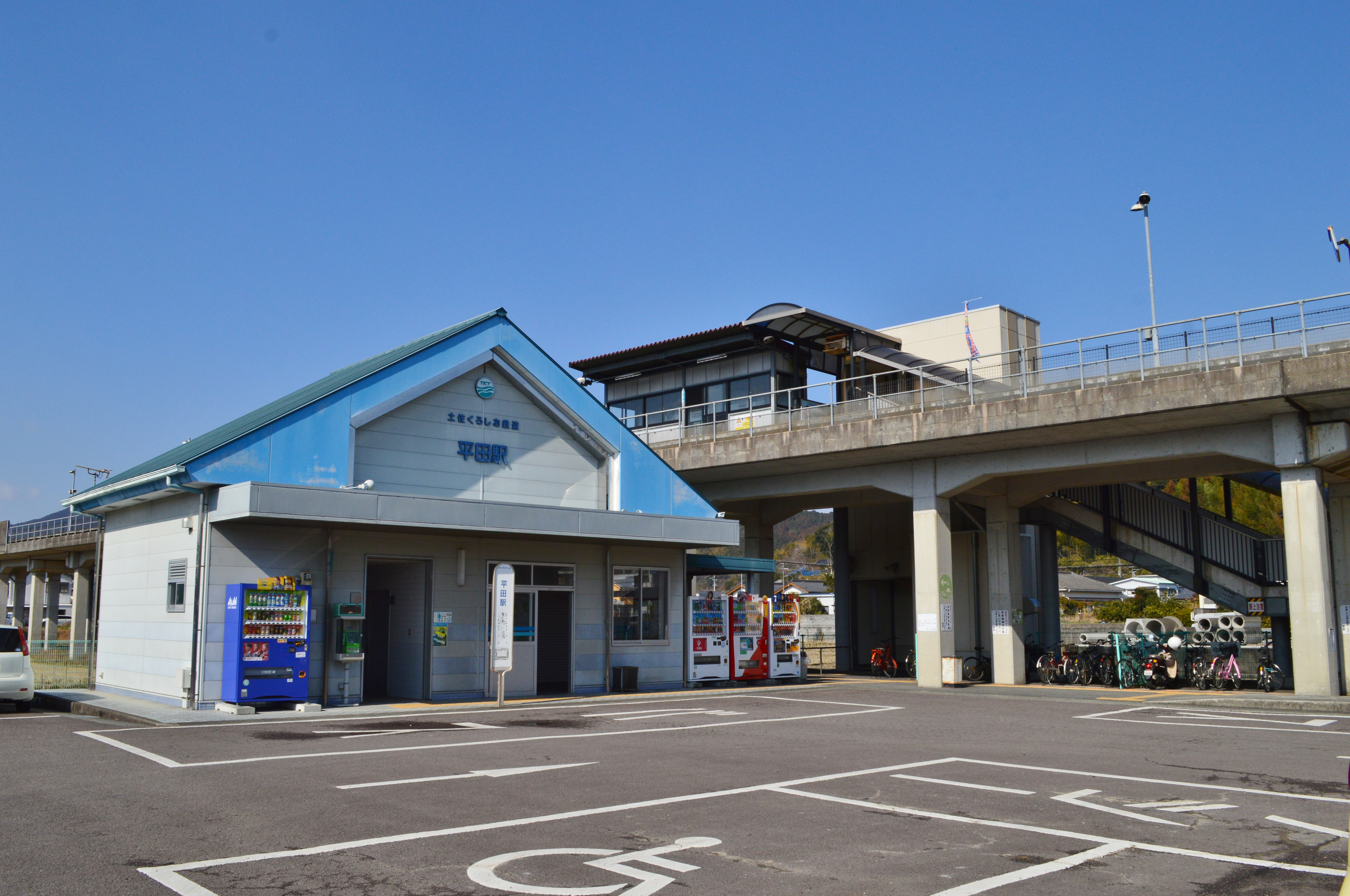
- Hirata Station in 2018

General information
- Location: Hiratacho Henai, Sukumo-shi, Kōchi-ken 788-0783; Japan
- Coordinates: 32°57′20″N 132°47′42″E
- Operator: Tosa Kuroshio Railway
- Line: Sukumo Line
- Distance: 15.3 km from Nakamura
- Platforms: 1 side platform
- Tracks: 1

Construction
- Structure type: Elevated

Other information
- Station code: TK45

History
- Opened: 1 October 1997

Passengers
- FY2019: 101
Location
- Location within Kochi Prefecture Location within Japan

Hirata Station (平田駅, Hirata-eki) is a passenger railway station located in the city of Sukumo, Kōchi Prefecture, Japan. It is operated by the third-sector Tosa Kuroshio Railway and has the station number "TK45".

== Lines and Trains ==
The station is served by the Tosa Kuroshio Railway Sukumo Line, and is located 15.3 km from the starting point of the line at Nakamura. Besides local trains stop, some trains of the JR Nanpū limited express service from Okayama to Kōchi, Nakamura and Sukumo and the Ashizuri from Kōchi to Nakamura and Sukumo also stop at Hirata.

== Layout ==
The station consists of a side platform serving a single elevated track. The station building, which has been built at the base of the elevated structure, is unstaffed and serves only as a waiting room. Access to the platform is by means of a flight of steps and an elevator. An enclosed shelter is provided on the platform for waiting passengers. Parking for cars is available at the station forecourt.

== Adjacent stations ==
«	Service	»
JR Shikoku
Limited Express Services
Nakamura	Nanpū	Sukumo
Nakamura	Ashizuri	Sukumo
Tosa Kuroshio Railway
Sukumo Line
Kōgyōdanchi	Local	Higashi-Sukumo

== History ==
The Tosa Kuroshio Railway opened the station on 1 October 1997 as an intermediate station on the Sukumo Line track which was laid down from Nakamura to Sukumo.

== Passenger statistics ==
In fiscal 2011, the station was used by an average of 156 passengers daily.

== Surrounding area ==
- Enkoji Temple - About 2 km from the station
- Sukumo City Hirata Elementary School
- Sukumo Municipal Hirata Nursery School

== See also ==
- List of railway stations in Japan
