= Kunimi Station =

Kunimi Station is the name of multiple train stations in Japan.

- Kunimi Station (Kōchi) - (国見駅) in Kōchi Prefecture
- Kunimi Station (Miyagi) - (国見駅) in Miyagi Prefecture
