= Arioka Station =

Railway station in Shimanto, Kōchi Prefecture, Japan

Arioka Station 有岡駅
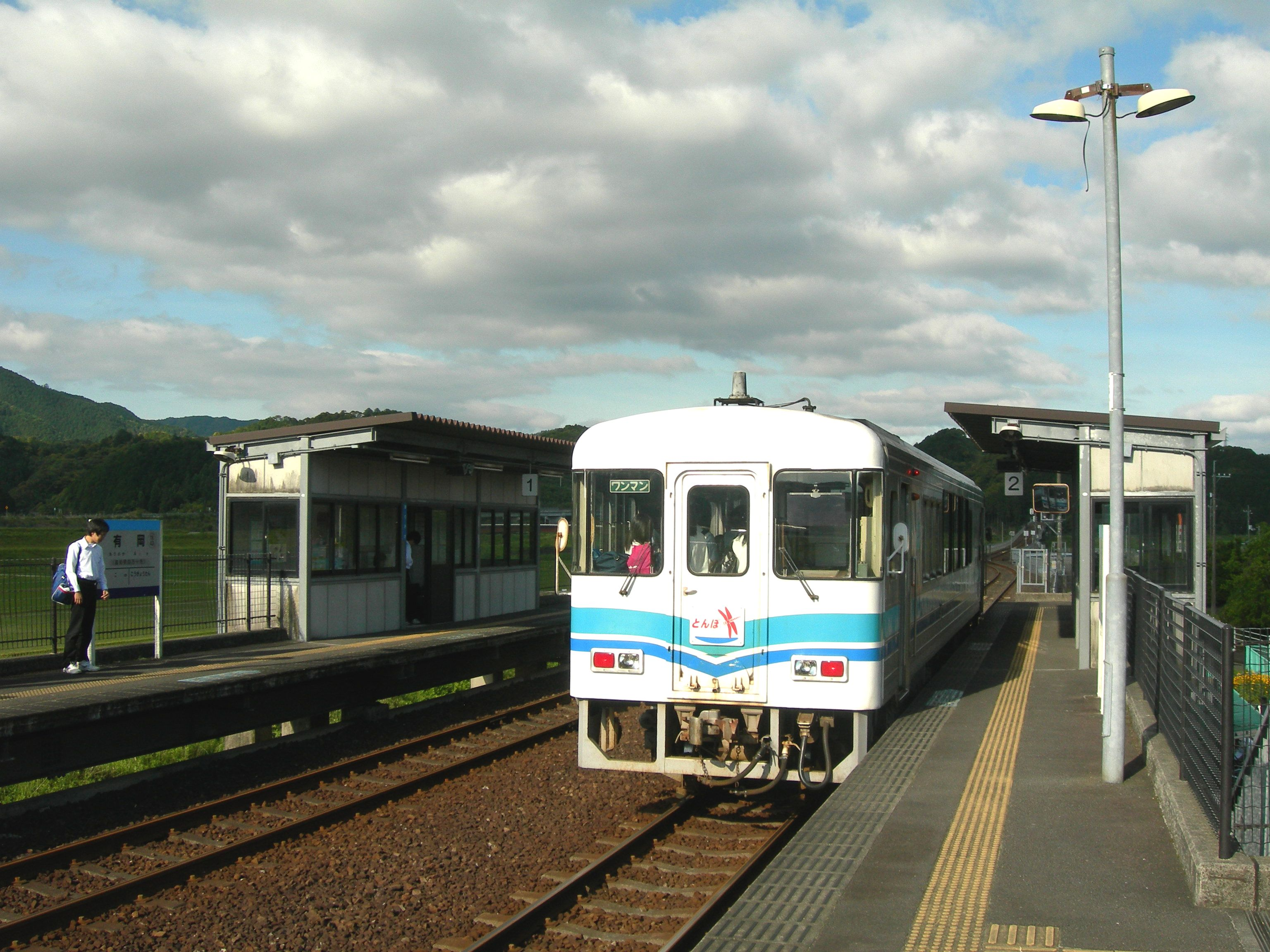
- Arioka Station in 2010

General information
- Location: Arioka, Shimanto-shi, Kōchi-ken 787-0771; Japan
- Coordinates: 32°57′41.21″N 132°49′59.96″E
- Operator: Tosa Kuroshio Railway
- Line: Sukumo Line
- Distance: 11.6 km from Nakamura
- Platforms: 2 side platforms
- Tracks: 2

Construction
- Structure type: Elevated
- Parking: Available
- Cycle facilities: Bike shed

Other information
- Station code: TK43

History
- Opened: 1 October 1997

Passengers
- FY2019: 81
Location
- Location within Kochi Prefecture Location within Japan

Arioka Station (有岡駅, Arioka-eki) is a passenger railway station located in the city of Shimanto, Kōchi Prefecture, Japan. It is operated by the Tosa Kuroshio Railway and has the station number "TK43".

== Lines and Trains ==
The station is served by the Tosa Kuroshio Railway Sukumo Line, and is located 11.2 km from the starting point of the line at Nakamura. Only local trains stop at the station. Some eastbound trains provide a through service beyond Nakamura on the Nakamura Line to Kubokawa.

== Layout ==
The station consists of two opposed side platforms serving two elevated tracks. There is no station building, but enclosed shelters are provided on both platforms for waiting passengers. Access to platforms is by means of separate flights of steps. A bike shed and parking lots for cars are available near the base of the steps.

== Adjacent stations ==
«	Service	»
Sukumo Line
Kunimi	Local	Kōgyōdanchi

== History ==
The Tosa Kuroshio Railway opened the station on 1 October 1997 as an intermediate station on the Sukumo Line track which was laid down from Nakamura to Sukumo.

== Passenger statistics ==
In fiscal 2011, the station was used by an average of 71 passengers daily.

== Surrounding area ==
- Shimanto City Hall Nakasuji Branch Office
- Shimanto Municipal Nakasuji Elementary School
- Shimanto Municipal Nakasuji Junior High School
- Japan National Route 56

== See also ==
- List of railway stations in Japan
