= Gudo (disambiguation) =

Gudo is a former municipality in the district of Bellinzona in the canton of Ticino in Switzerland.

Gudo may also refer to:

- Gudo Visconti, municipality in the Metropolitan City of Milan in the region Lombardy, Italy
- Gudō Station, railway station on the Tosa Kuroshio Railway Sukumo Line in Shimanto, Kōchi Prefecture, Japan
