= Ōtsuki, Kōchi =

Ōtsuki 大月町
- Town
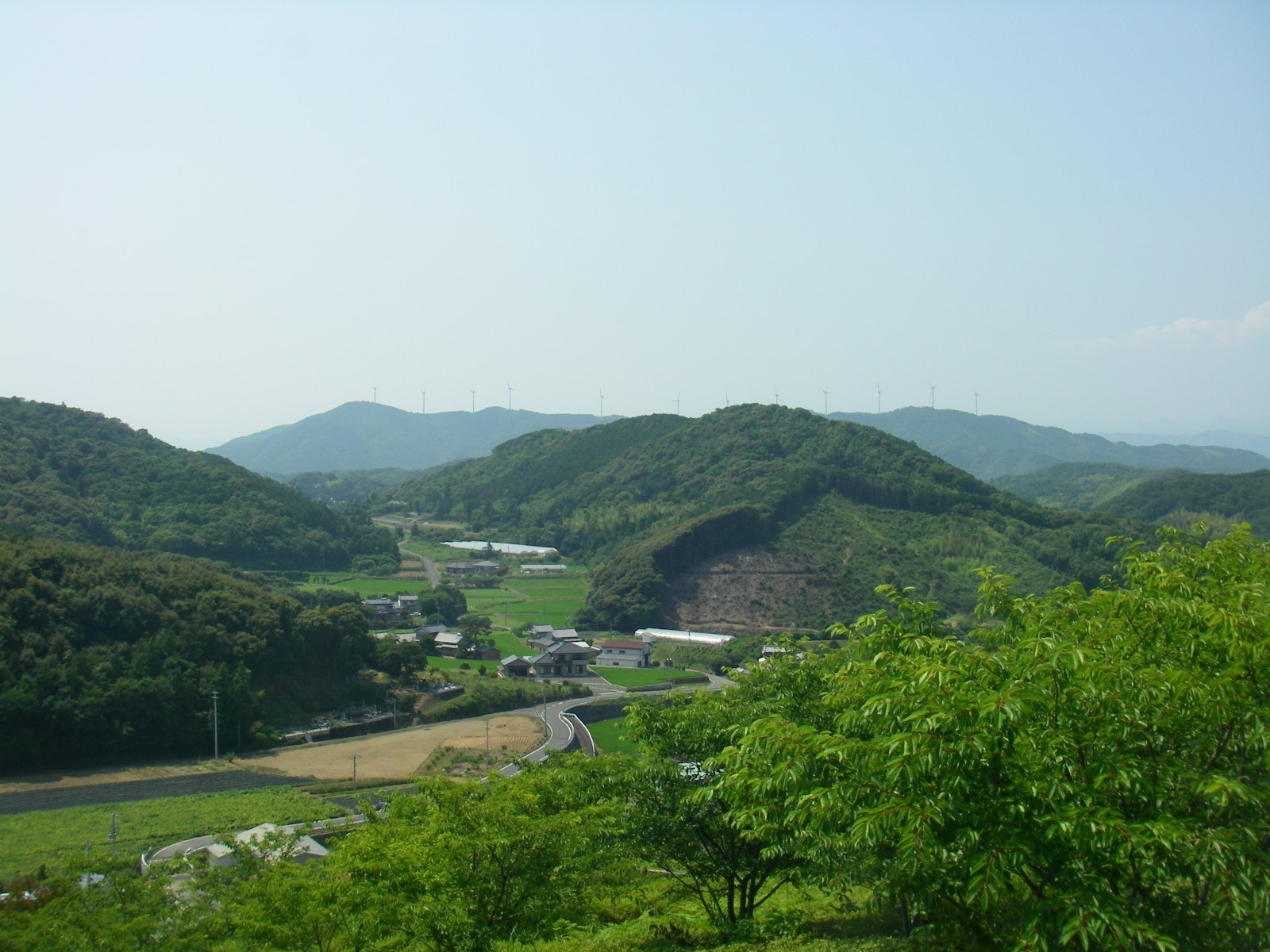
- A view of Otsuki's windmills from the top of Fureai Park

- Flag Seal
- Location of Ōtsuki in Kōchi Prefecture

- Location in Japan
- Coordinates: 32°50′29″N 132°42′25″E
- Country: Japan
- Region: Shikoku
- Prefecture: Kōchi
- District: Hata

Government
  - Mayor: Junichi Okada

Area
  - Total: 102.94 km^{2} (39.75 sq mi)

Population (September 1, 2022)
  - Total: 4,626
  - Density: 44.94/km^{2} (116.4/sq mi)
- Time zone: UTC+09:00 (JST)
- City hall address: 2230 Hiromi, Ōtsuki-chō, Hata-gun, Kōchi-ken 788-0302
- Website: Official website
- Symbols
- Bird: Omizunagidori (Calonectris leucomelas)
- Flower: Crinum (Crinum asiaticum)
- Tree: Ubamegashi (Quercus phillyraeoides)

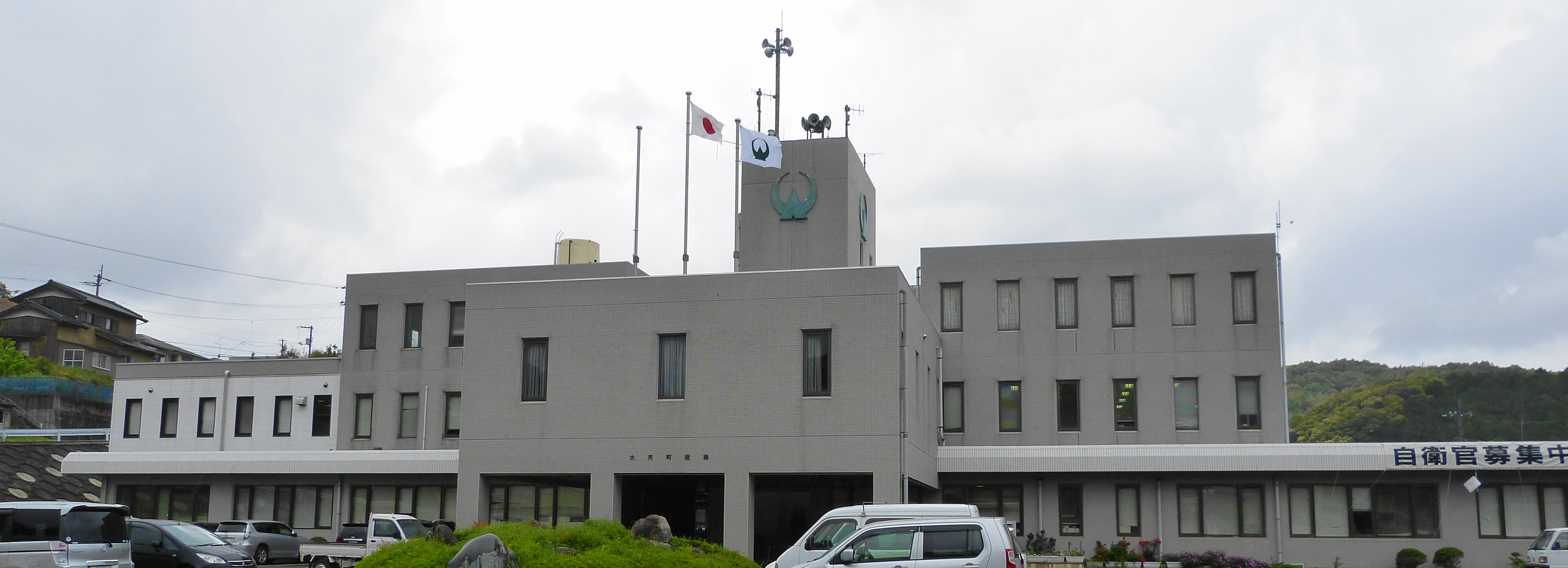
Ōtsuki Town Hall

Ōtsuki (大月町, Ōtsuki-chō) is a town in the Hata District, Kōchi Prefecture, Japan. As of 31 July 2022, the town had an estimated population of 4,626 in 2541 households, and a population density of 45 persons per km^{2}. The total area of the town is 102.94 square kilometres (39.75 sq mi).

== Geography ==
Ōtsuki is located in far southwestern corner of Kōchi Prefecture on the island of Shikoku. It is located approximately 184 km away from downtown Kōchi. Approximately 70% of the town area is heavily wooded mountain forests. Ōtsuki is bordered by Sukumo to the north and Tosashimizu to the east, and faces the Pacific Ocean to the south. The Bungo Channel, which separates Kyushu and Shikoku, runs along the west of Ōtsuki, while the Kuroshio Current brushes up against its south shores. To its south, Ōtsuki has a small collection of islands, including Kashiwajima, Okinojima, and Ugurushima.

=== Neighbouring municipalities ===
Kōchi Prefecture

- Sukumo
- Tosashimizu

=== Seismicity ===
Ōtsuki, along with the coastline along Kochi prefecture, is close to the Nankai Trough, and experiences seismic activity related to the Nankai megathrust earthquakes. These earthquakes typically result in landslides, flooding, and tsunamis, in addition to damage from seismic activity. These earthquakes occur approximately 100–200 years apart, with the most recent earthquake occurring in 1946.

=== Climate ===
Ōtsuki has a humid subtropical climate (Köppen Cfa) characterized by warm summers and cool winters with light snowfall. The average annual temperature in Ōtsuki is 17.0 °C. The average annual rainfall is 2209 mm with September as the wettest month. The temperatures are highest on average in January, at around 26.3 °C, and lowest in January, at around 7.4 °C.

== Demographics ==
Per Japanese census data, the population of Ōtsuki has been decreased steadily since the 1960s.

The Ōtsuki Town Hall displays its demographics on its homepage. These statistics are updated bi-monthly. The population of Ōtsuki peaked at 13,688 in 1960, and has seen a steady yearly decline since. Ōtsuki has issues with rural flight and population decline, much like other parts of rural Japan. As can be seen in the graph provided, the majority of residents in Ōtsuki were between 45 and 84 years of age in 2006. As of August 2014, Ōtsuki contains 2,785 households, with an overall estimated population of 5,719, and a gender ratio of 1.11 females to each male.

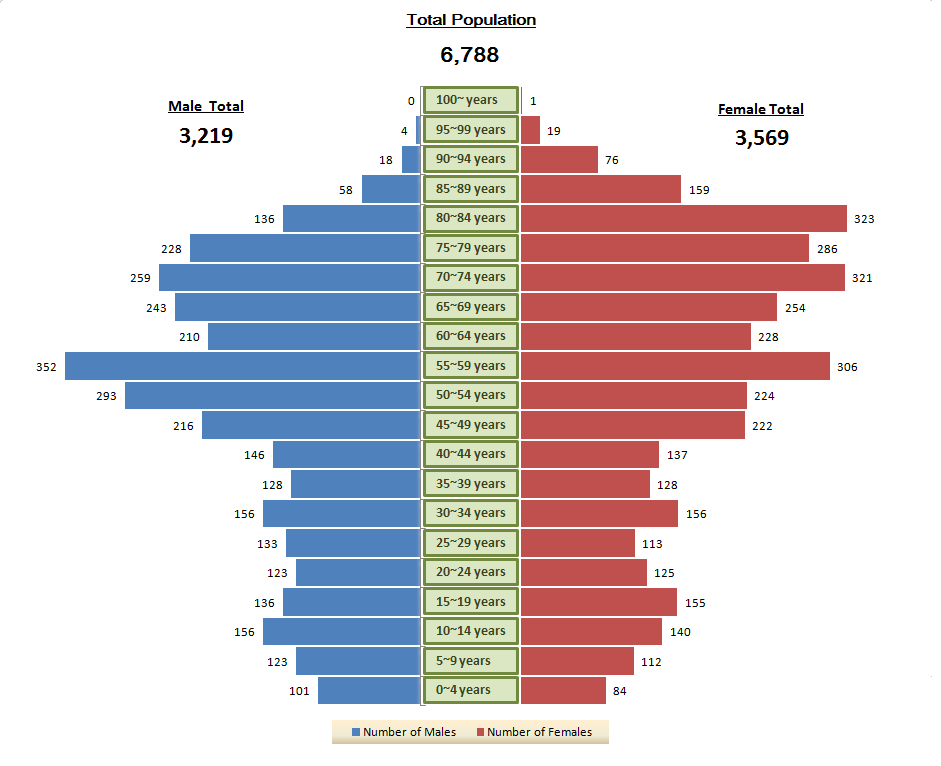
A graph of Ōtsuki's gender distribution by age (Basic Resident Registration results from October 1, 2006).

Historical population
Year	Pop.	±%
1920	11,642	—
1930	11,733	+0.8%
1940	11,224	−4.3%
1950	14,884	+32.6%
1960	13,688	−8.0%
1970	9,341	−31.8%
1980	8,865	−5.1%
1990	7,941	−10.4%
2000	6,956	−12.4%
2010	5,783	−16.9%
2020	4,434	−23.3%
Source: Ōtsuki population statistics (2000-2020)

== History ==
Signs of human presence, including stone knives and tools, date back as far as the Japanese Paleolithic,approximately 20,000 years ago. As with all of Kōchi Prefecture, the area of Ōtsuki was part of ancient Tosa Province. Granite blocks cut from stones in the Kashira Tsudoi (頭集い) area of town were shipped from Ōtsuki and used in the construction of Osaka Castle (大阪城) and Nagoya Castle (名古屋城), in 1585 and 1610 respectively. During the Edo period, the area was part of the holdings of Tosa Domain ruled by the Yamauchi clan from their seat at Kōchi Castle. The village of Okuuchi (奥内村) was established with the creation of the modern municipalities system on October 1, 1889. It was raised to town status on November 3, 1951, changing its name to Ōuchi (大内町). The town of Ōuchi and the village of Tsukinada (月灘村) merged on February 11, 1957, to form the town of Ōtsuki, which took its name from the first kanji of each of its component parts.

== Government ==
Ōtsuki has a mayor-council form of government with a directly elected mayor and a unicameral town council of ten members. Ōtsuki, together with Sukumo and Mihara, contributes two members to the Kōchi Prefectural Assembly. In terms of national politics, the town is part of Kōchi 2nd district of the lower house of the Diet of Japan.

== Economy ==
Ōtsuki has an economy based on developed agriculture, forestry and fishing industries, and the town has invested in renewable energy resources with 12 wind-powered generators installed on Mount Mukuri, with an additional bank of generators on Mount Ōhora scheduled for completion in 2015.

== Education ==
Ōtsuki formerly had nine elementary schools, which were consolidated into one school in 2009, and five middle schools, which were consolidated into one in 2001. Ōtsuki additionally had a campus of the Sukumo High School in town, however it closed as of April 2014.

Ōtsuki has three nursery schools located in Hiromi, Kashiwajima, and Himenoi.

== Transportation ==
=== Railway ===
Ōtsuki does not have any passenger railway service. The nearest station is Sukumo Station in Sukumo

=== Highways ===
National Route 321, also known as Sunny Road (サニーロード) is the main road that connects Ōtsuki to Tosashimizu to the east and Sukumoto the north. Ōtsuki Fureai Park is the town's roadside station. In addition to public bathrooms and parking, and having a bus-stop out front, the station sells local wares and produce, and the restaurant on the second floor offers a wide variety of delicious foods using local ingredients. Developed right in Otsuki, the Ichigōri (苺氷り) available on the first floor is a must-try delicacy for any sweets lover.

== Local attractions ==
Kannon Rock (観音岩, Kannon-iwa)

- A rock that stands 30 meters high above the deep blue ocean and resembles the image of the goddess Kannon. In 1638, during the revolt of Shimabara, it is said that a man named Amenomori Kudayu was sent to quell the uprest but was injured in battle and retreated with his men by ship. His condition deteriorated, and while there were no lighthouses at the time, it is said that the crew headed towards a light that was coming from Kashiwajima. When the ship approached Kannon Rock, Kudayu died from his wounds, and at that moment a beam of light radiated from Kannon Rock. Since then, the rock has been thought to be sacred.

Monkey Park

- The Monkey Park (お猿公園), overlooking the beautiful Ōdō Kaigan, is open year-round. The monkeys are friendly, but care should always be taken when feeding them. Feed is available for ¥200, and the park is closed on Mondays. When Monday is a holiday, the park is instead closed on the next regular weekday.

Oman's Waterfall (お万の滝, Oman no Taki)

- Along the same hiking trail that passes by Kannon Rock is a cliff called Oman Taki. Despite being called a waterfall, there is no running water; locals use the word "taki" (滝, lit. 'waterfall') to mean "cliff". There once was a beautiful blind woman named Oman (お万) who fell in love with a man whose job it was to protect the island (most likely a samurai of higher social class). Oman thought of this man's job as an important role and somewhat became obsessed with him, but when she realized this love could never be, she decided to throw herself from the edge of this cliff and plummeted to her death approximately 120 m to the ocean below. The exact date is unknown, but eventually the cliff came to be known as Oman's Waterfall in memory of this tragic story.

Tsukiyama Shrine (月山神社)

- Tsukiyama Shrine, which has a thousand years of history, is located on Mt. Moritsuki. It is believed to have been a shrine where Kūkai performed ascetic practices. As a former center of Shugendō training, it is visited by a great number of people from all over the country. The coastal area near a temple called "Ōtsukinada" used to be famous for pink corals, and it is believed to be the first place where corals were gathered for living. In recent years parties of pilgrims have been using well-paved roads. However, the local people founded a group called the Association for the Preservation of the Pilgrimage Route to restore such routes to their original state for the first time in 40 years. The routes run through mountains and seacoasts.

=== Beaches and diving ===
Hotel Bellreef Otsuki and Ecology Camp

- Hotel Bellreef Otsuki (ホテルベルリーフ大月) is an ocean-side hotel towards the south end of town. It contains a restaurant, space for large dinner parties, and a Japanese style bath.
- Ecology Camp (大月エコロジーキャンプ場) is located just below Hotel Bellreef. There are rental sites for tents as well as rental cottages, multiple cooking facilities, multiple restrooms, and some convenient vending machines. Sea Kayaks are available for rental and are the highlight of the Ecology Camp experience.

Kashiwajima Island (柏島)

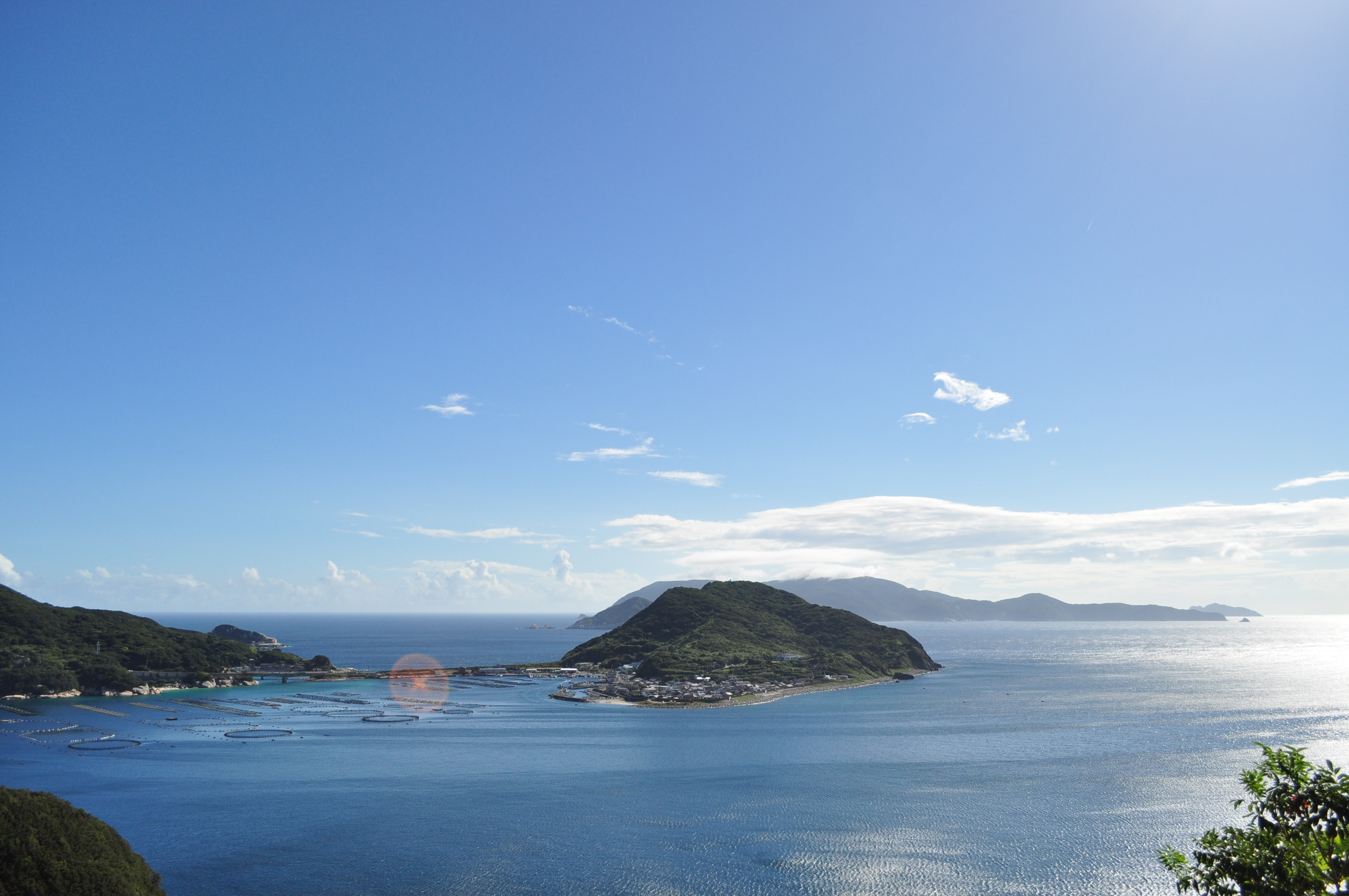
Kashiwajima Island

- Tourists come to Kashiwajima Island to scuba dive. Around 1,000 different kinds of fish, both temperate and tropical, can be found in the waters around Kashiwajima. The island is even said to have one of the world's largest concentrations of reef-building corals. To date, 123 different types of coral have been confirmed within Ōtsuki. Kashiwajima Island can be reached by car.

Kashiwajima Shirahama Beach

- A small yet beautiful white sand beach (白浜) off the road just before Kashiwajima Island. People gather here to sunbathe, BBQ, and swim in the clear water. Thanks to its location, shielded from colder Pacific currents by both the mainland and Kashiwajima Island, the water remains substantially warmer than other beaches along the Pacific Ocean side.

Ryugahama Campgrounds

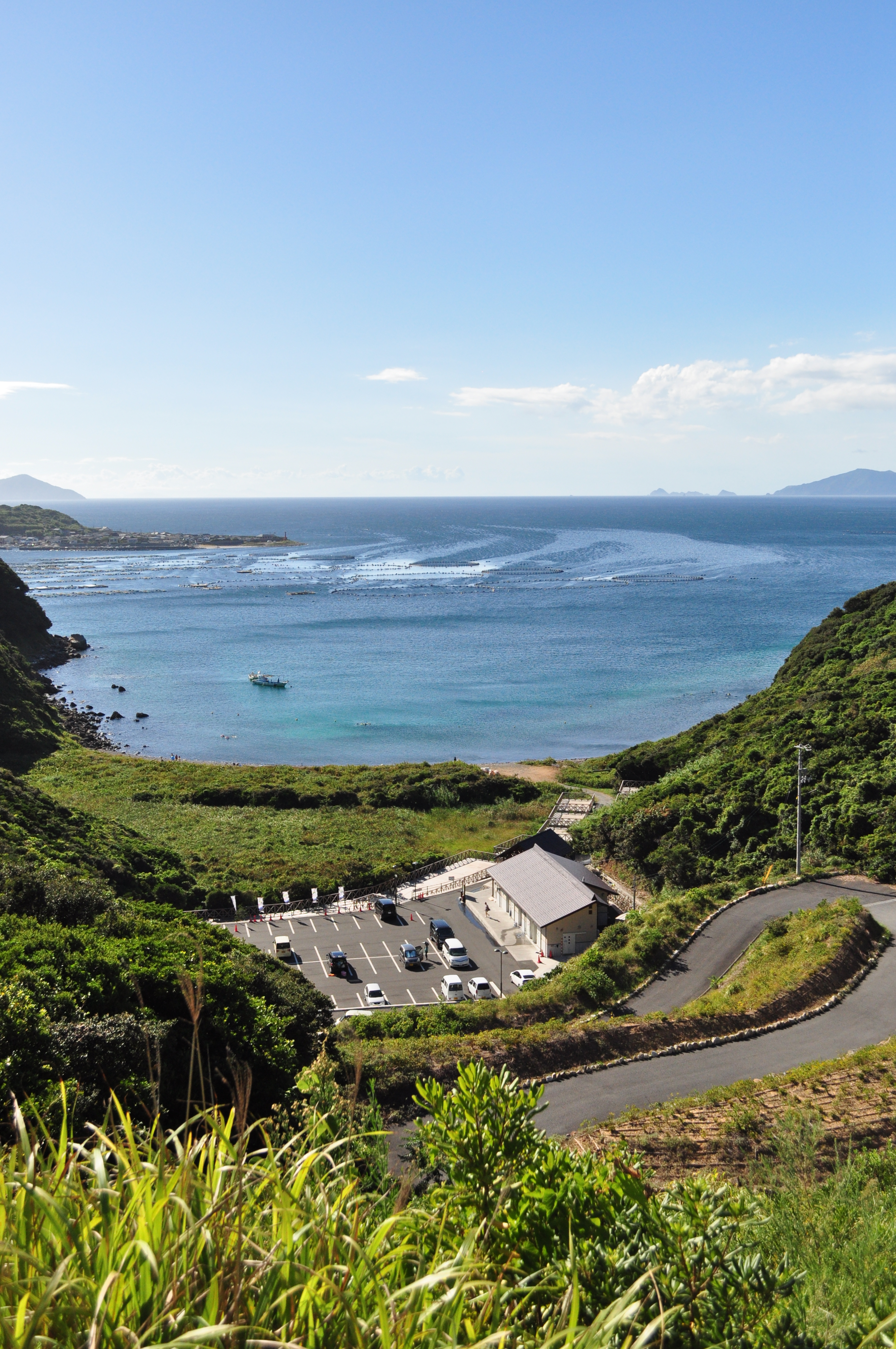
Ryugahama Campgrounds (竜ヶ浜キャンプ場), as seen from the entrance.

- Ryugahama Campgrounds (竜ヶ浜キャンプ場) is a campgrounds near Kashiwajima Island. Although the coast is a stone beach unsuitable for sunbathing, the main attraction is snorkeling in the inlet. There are many types of coral and varieties of fish in very close proximity to the shore. In addition to rental campsites and camp gear, rental snorkeling equipment and other items are available for a reasonable price. The cooking facility has a brick pizza oven in addition to the standard cooking fire enclosures.

=== Festivals ===
One of the town's most unusual traditions, an event called the Mizu Abise (水浴びせ), has its roots in the year 1662. A massive fire occurred in the fishing village of Komame (古満目), and to prevent a similar catastrophe from reoccurring, a ritual to be carried out each new year was prescribed. In the modern day, this ritual is carried out every year on January 2, and includes elders making offerings at several locations in the village while young men sit waiting outside wearing only simple yukatas. When the elders come out, they douse the young men with bucket after bucket of cold sea water, and the procession moves on to the next location of prayer. After 2 to 3 hours of enduring the cold and making prayers to ward off disaster, the event comes to a close as families prepare warm baths to reinvigorate the freezing participants.
