= Kōgyōdanchi Station =

Railway station in Sukumo, Kōchi Prefecture, Japan

Kōgyōdanchi Station 工業団地駅
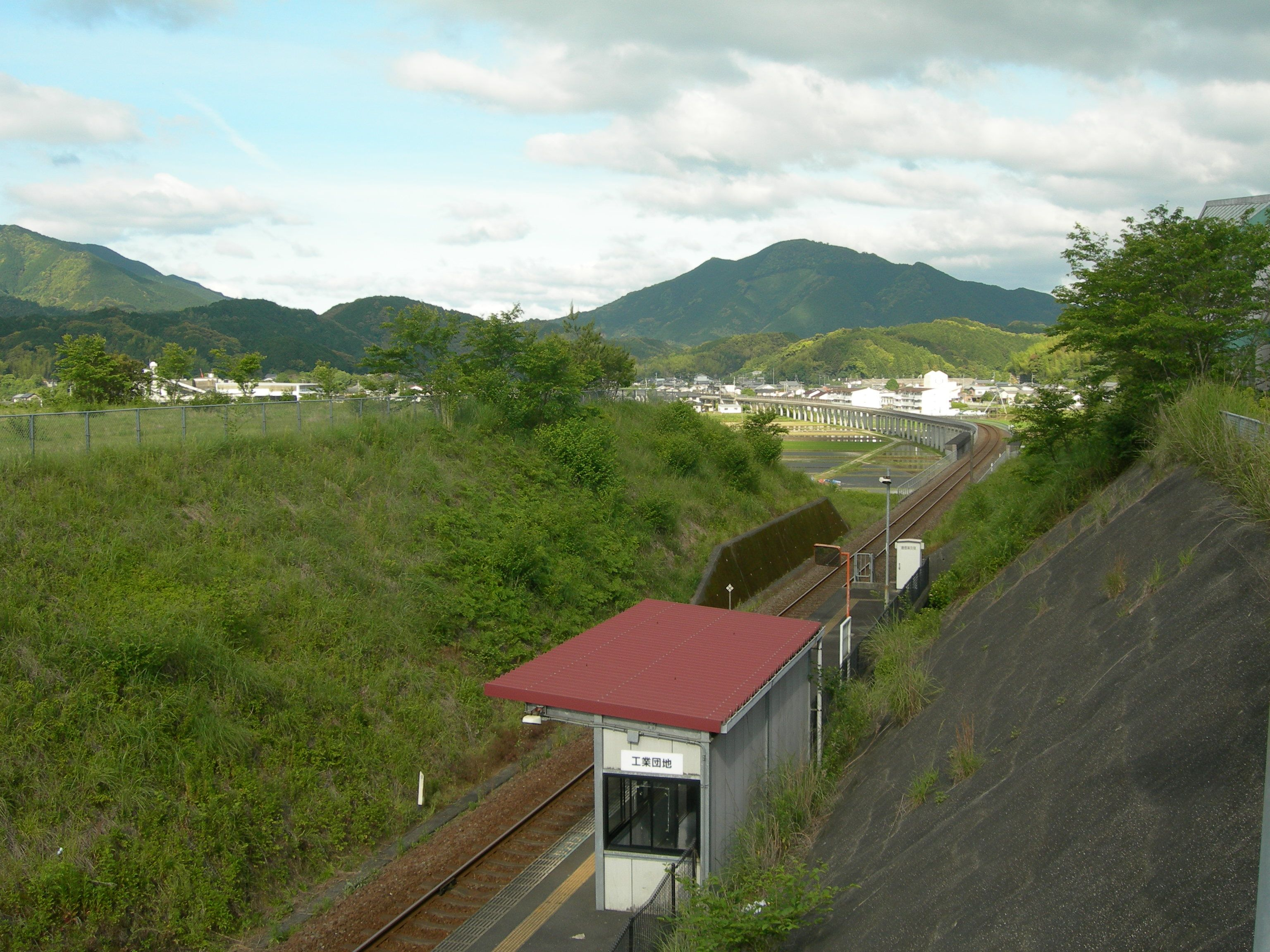
- Kōgyōdanchi Station in 2010

General information
- Location: Hiratacho Henai, Sukumo-shi, Kōchi-ken 788-0783, Japan; Japan
- Coordinates: 32°57′23″N 132°48′07″E
- Operator: Tosa Kuroshio Railway
- Line: Sukumo Line
- Distance: 14.7 km from Nakamura
- Platforms: 1 side platform
- Tracks: 1

Construction
- Structure type: At grade (cutting)
- Cycle facilities: Bike shed
- Accessible: No - steps lead down to platform

Other information
- Station code: TK44

History
- Opened: 1 October 1997

Passengers
- FY2019: 20
Location
- Location within Kochi Prefecture Location within Japan

Kōgyōdanchi Station (工業団地駅, Kōgyōdanchi-eki) is a passenger railway station located in the city of Sukumo, Kōchi Prefecture, Japan. It is operated by the third-sector Tosa Kuroshio Railway and has the station number "TK44".

== Lines and Trains ==
The station is served by the Tosa Kuroshio Railway Sukumo Line, and is located 14.7 km from the starting point of the line at Nakamura. Only local trains stop at the station. Some eastbound trains provide a through service beyond Nakamura on the Nakamura Line to Kubokawa.

== Layout ==
The station consists of a side platform serving a single track set in a cutting. There is no station building, but an enclosed shelter is provided on the platform for waiting passengers. The access road leads to the top of the cutting from where a flight of steps leads down to the platform. Bike sheds are provided at the top of the stairs.

== Adjacent stations ==
«	Service	»
Sukumo Line
Arioka	Local	Hirata

== History ==
The Tosa Kuroshio Railway opened the station on 1 October 1997 as an intermediate station on the Sukumo Line track which was laid down from Nakamura to Sukumo.

== Passenger statistics ==
In fiscal 2011, the station was used by an average of 42 passengers daily.

== Surrounding area ==
- Nakasuji River
- Sukumo Industrial Park
- Kochi Prefectural Sukumo Technical High School
- Sukumo Municipal Higashi Junior High School

== See also ==
- List of railway stations in Japan
