= Higashi-Sukumo Station =

Railway station in Sukumo, Kōchi Prefecture, Japan

Higashisukumo Station 東宿毛駅
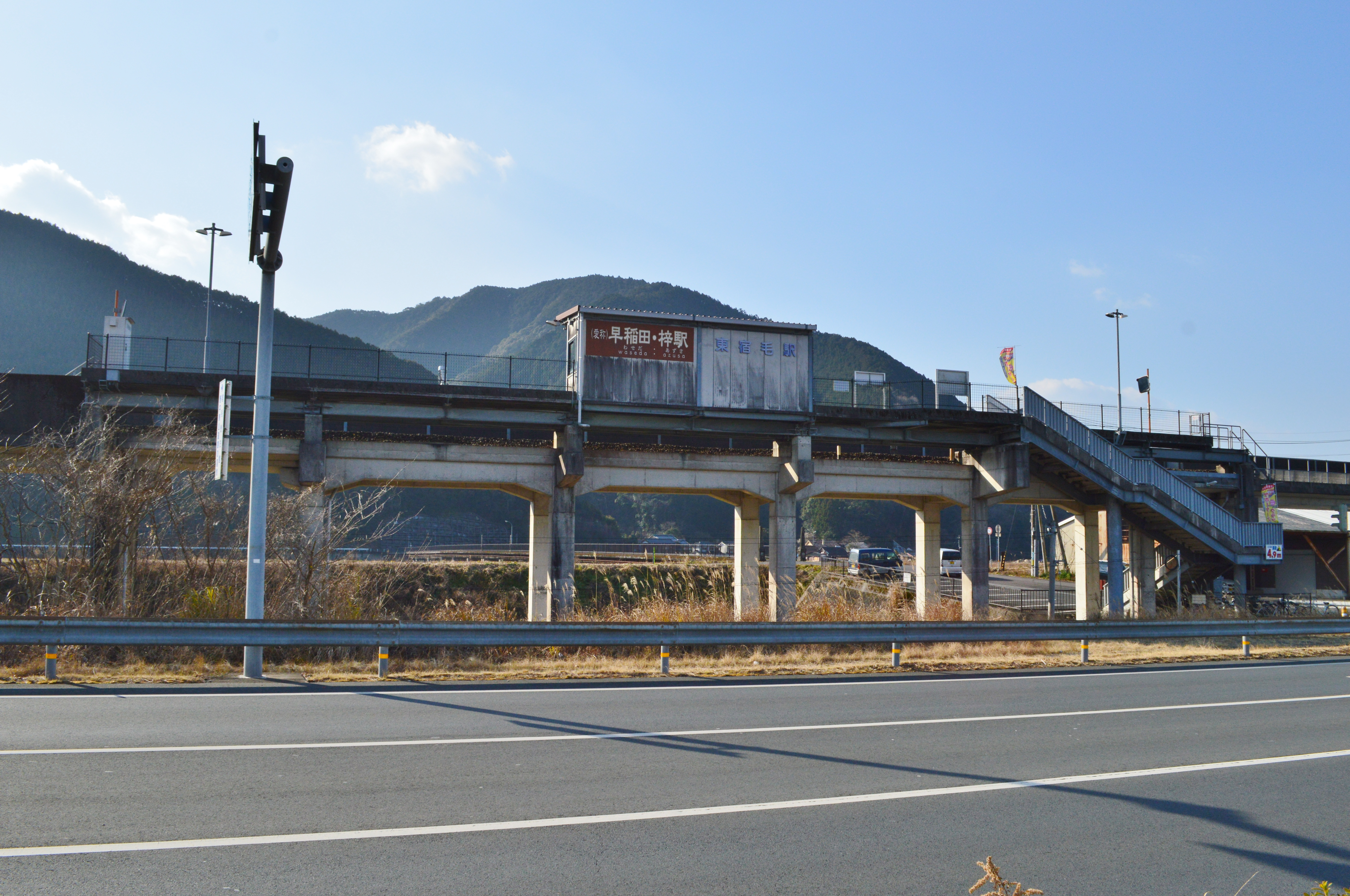
- Higashisukumo Station in 2018

General information
- Location: 8 Chome Chūō, Sukumo-shi, Kōchi-ken 788-0001; Japan
- Coordinates: 32°56′01″N 132°43′43″E
- Operator: Tosa Kuroshio Railway
- Line: Sukumo Line
- Distance: 22.2 km from Nakamura
- Platforms: 1 side platform
- Tracks: 1

Construction
- Structure type: Elevated
- Cycle facilities: Bike shed
- Accessible: No - steps lead down to platform

Other information
- Station code: TK46

History
- Opened: 1 October 1997

Passengers
- FY2019: 24
Location
- Location within Kochi Prefecture Location within Japan

Higashi-Sukumo Station (東宿毛駅, Higashi-Sukumo-eki) is a passenger railway station located in the city of Sukumo, Kōchi Prefecture, Japan. It is operated by the third-sector Tosa Kuroshio Railway and has the station number "TK44".

== Lines and Trains ==
The station is served by the Tosa Kuroshio Railway Sukumo Line, and is located 22.2 km from the starting point of the line at Nakamura. Only local trains stop at the station. Some eastbound trains provide a through service beyond Nakamura on the Nakamura Line to Kubokawa.

== Layout ==
The station consists of a side platform serving a single elevated track. There is no station building, but an enclosed shelter is provided on the platform for waiting passengers. Access to the platform is by means of a flight of steps.

== Adjacent stations ==
| « | Service | » |
Sukumo Line
| Hirata | Local | Sukumo |

== History ==
The Tosa Kuroshio Railway opened the station on 1 October 1997 as an intermediate station on the Sukumo Line track which was laid down from Nakamura to Sukumo.

== Passenger statistics ==
In fiscal 2011, the station was used by an average of 32 passengers daily.

== Surrounding area ==
- Sukumo City Hall
- Sukumo Municipal Sukumo Elementary School

== See also ==
- List of railway stations in Japan
