= Gudō Station =

Railway station in Shimanto, Kōchi Prefecture, Japan

Gudō Station 具同駅
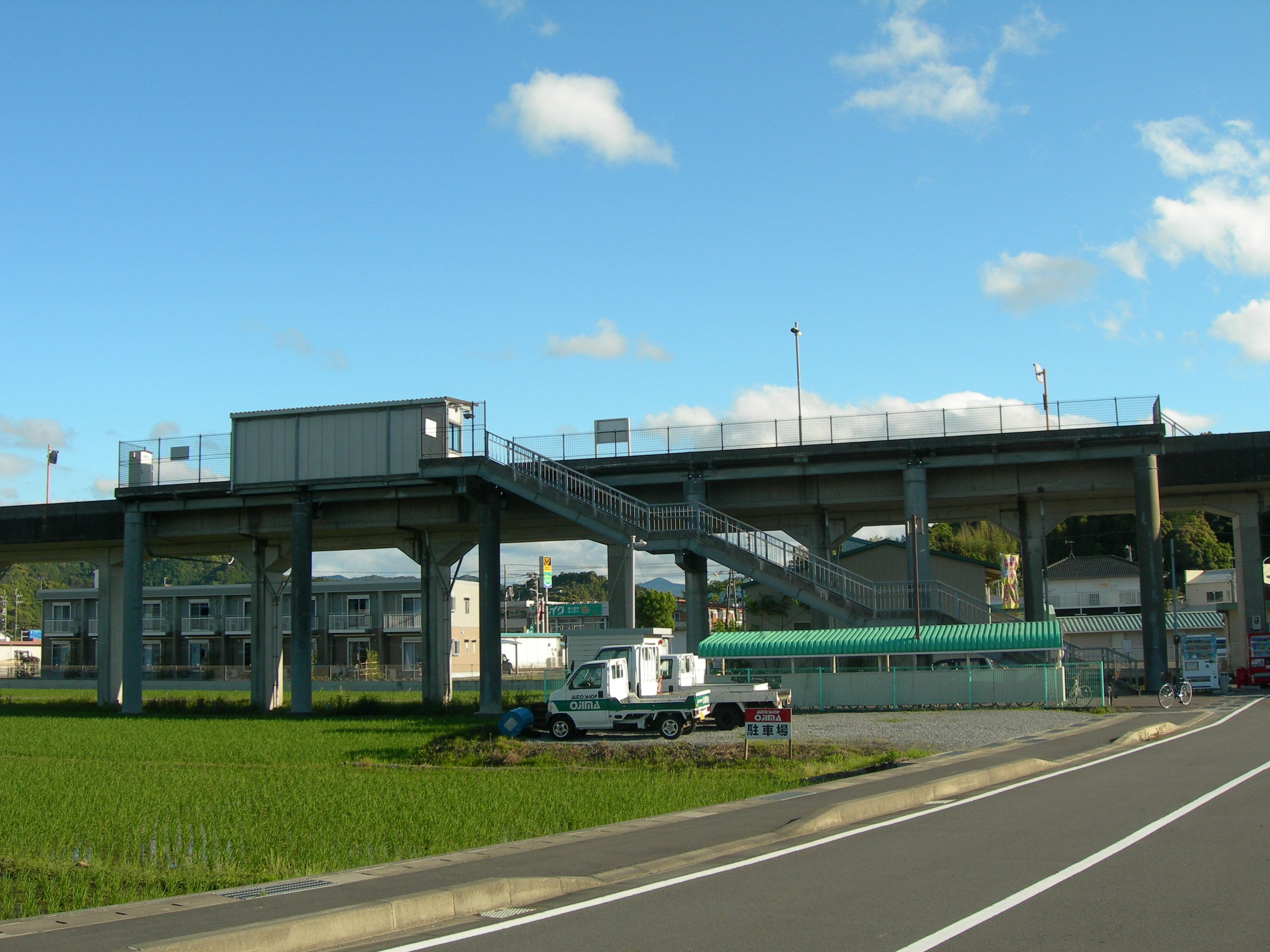
- Gudō Station in 2010

General information
- Location: Gudo, Shimanto-shi, Kōchi-ken 787-0019; Japan
- Coordinates: 32°58′46″N 132°54′54″E
- Operator: Tosa Kuroshio Railway
- Line: Tosa Kuroshio Railway Sukumo Line
- Distance: 3.2 km from Nakamura
- Platforms: 1
- Tracks: 1

Construction
- Structure type: Elevated
- Parking: Available
- Cycle facilities: Bike shed
- Accessible: No - steps to platform

Other information
- Status: Unstaffed
- Station code: TK41

History
- Opened: 1 October 1997

Passengers
- FY2018: 80
Location
- Location within Kochi Prefecture Location within Japan

Gudō Station (具同駅, Gudō-eki) is a passenger railway station located in the city of Shimanto, Kōchi Prefecture, Japan. It is operated by the third-sector Tosa Kuroshio Railway and has the station number "TK41".

== Lines and Trains ==
The station is served by the Tosa Kuroshio Railway Sukumo Line, and is located 3.2 km from the starting point of the line at Nakamura. Only local trains stop at the station. Some eastbound trains provide a through service beyond Nakamura on the Nakamura Line to Kubokawa.

== Layout ==
The station consists of a side platform serving a single elevated track. There is no station building, but an enclosed shelter is provided on the platform for waiting passengers. Access to platform is by means of a flight of steps. A bike shed and parking lots for cars are available near the base of the steps.

== Adjacent stations ==
«	Service	»
Sukumo Line
Nakamura	Local	Kunimi

== History ==
The Tosa Kuroshio Railway opened the station on 1 October 1997 as an intermediate station on the Sukumo Line track which was laid down from Nakamura to Sukumo.

== Passenger statistics ==
In fiscal 2011, the station was used by an average of 91 passengers daily.

== Surrounding area ==
- Shimanto Municipal Gudou Elementary School
- Akamatsu housing complex
- Shimanto Dragonfly Nature Park

== See also ==
- List of railway stations in Japan
