= Sukumo =

Sukumo 宿毛市
- City
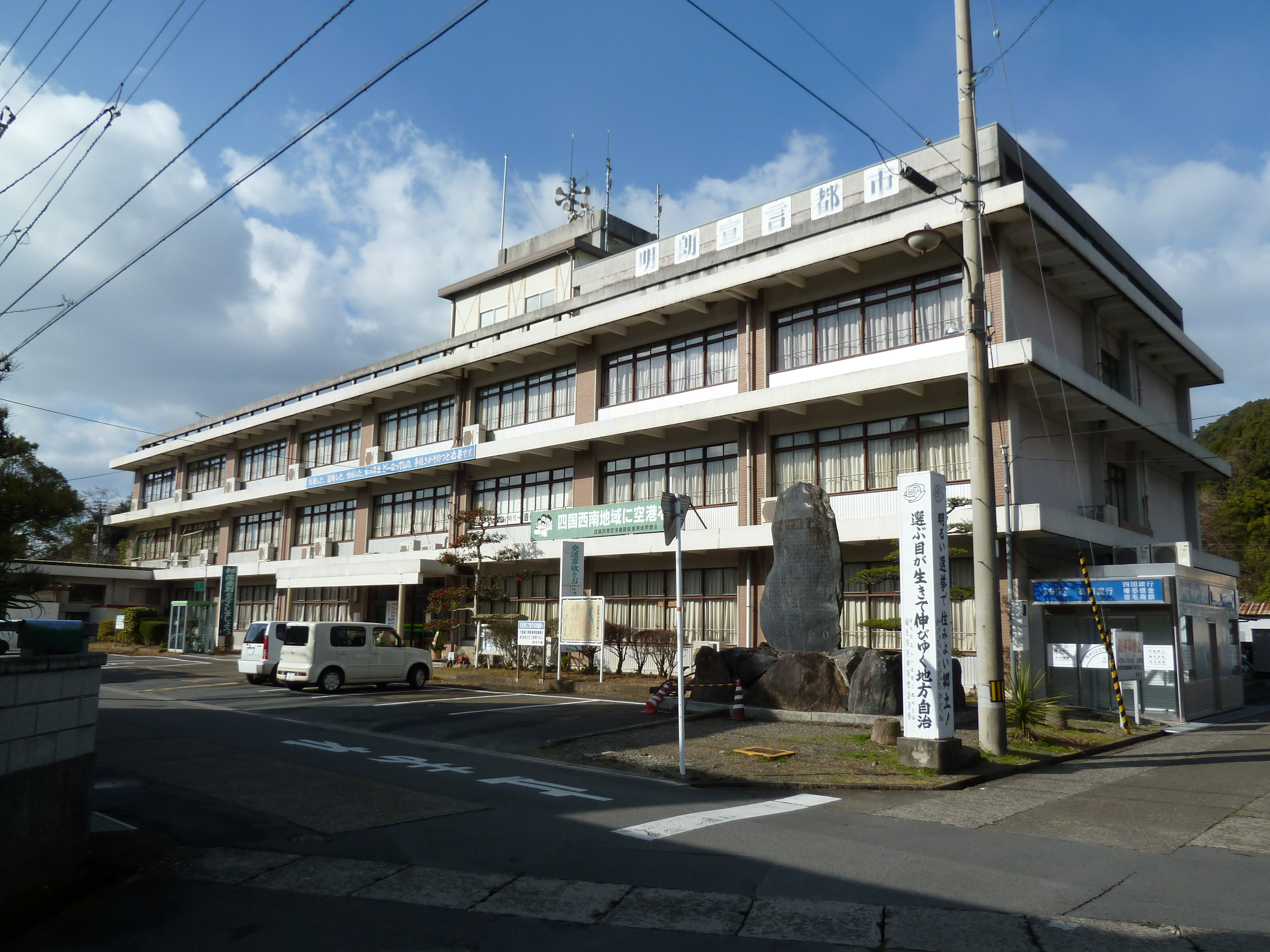
- Sukumo City Hall

- Flag Chapter
- /0/queryThe property query is required; /0/idsThe property ids is required; /0Failed to match at least one schema; /0/titleThe property title is required; /0/serviceDoes not have a value in the enumeration ["page"]; /0Failed to match exactly one schema; /0/geometriesThe property geometries is required; /0/typeDoes not have a value in the enumeration ["GeometryCollection"]; /0/typeDoes not have a value in the enumeration ["MultiPolygon"]; /0/typeDoes not have a value in the enumeration ["Point"]; /0/typeDoes not have a value in the enumeration ["MultiPoint"]; /0/typeDoes not have a value in the enumeration ["LineString"]; /0/typeDoes not have a value in the enumeration ["MultiLineString"]; /0/typeDoes not have a value in the enumeration ["Polygon"]; /0/coordinatesThe property coordinates is required; /0/geometryThe property geometry is required; /0/typeDoes not have a value in the enumeration ["Feature"]; /0/featuresThe property features is required; /0/typeDoes not have a value in the enumeration ["FeatureCollection"]; Location of Sukumo in Kōchi Prefecture

- Location in Japan
- Coordinates: 32°56′N 132°43′E
- Country: Japan
- Region: Shikoku
- Prefecture: Kōchi

Government
  - Mayor: Toshio Okimoto

Area
  - Total: 286.20 km^{2} (110.50 sq mi)

Population (1 August 2022)
  - Total: 19,292
  - Density: 67.407/km^{2} (174.58/sq mi)
- Time zone: UTC+09:00 (JST)
- City hall address: 2-1 Sakura, Sukumo-shi, Kochi-ken 788-8686
- Climate: Cfa
- Website: Official website
- Symbols
- Bird: Zosterops japonicus
- Flower: Orchidaceae
- Tree: Cinnamomum camphora

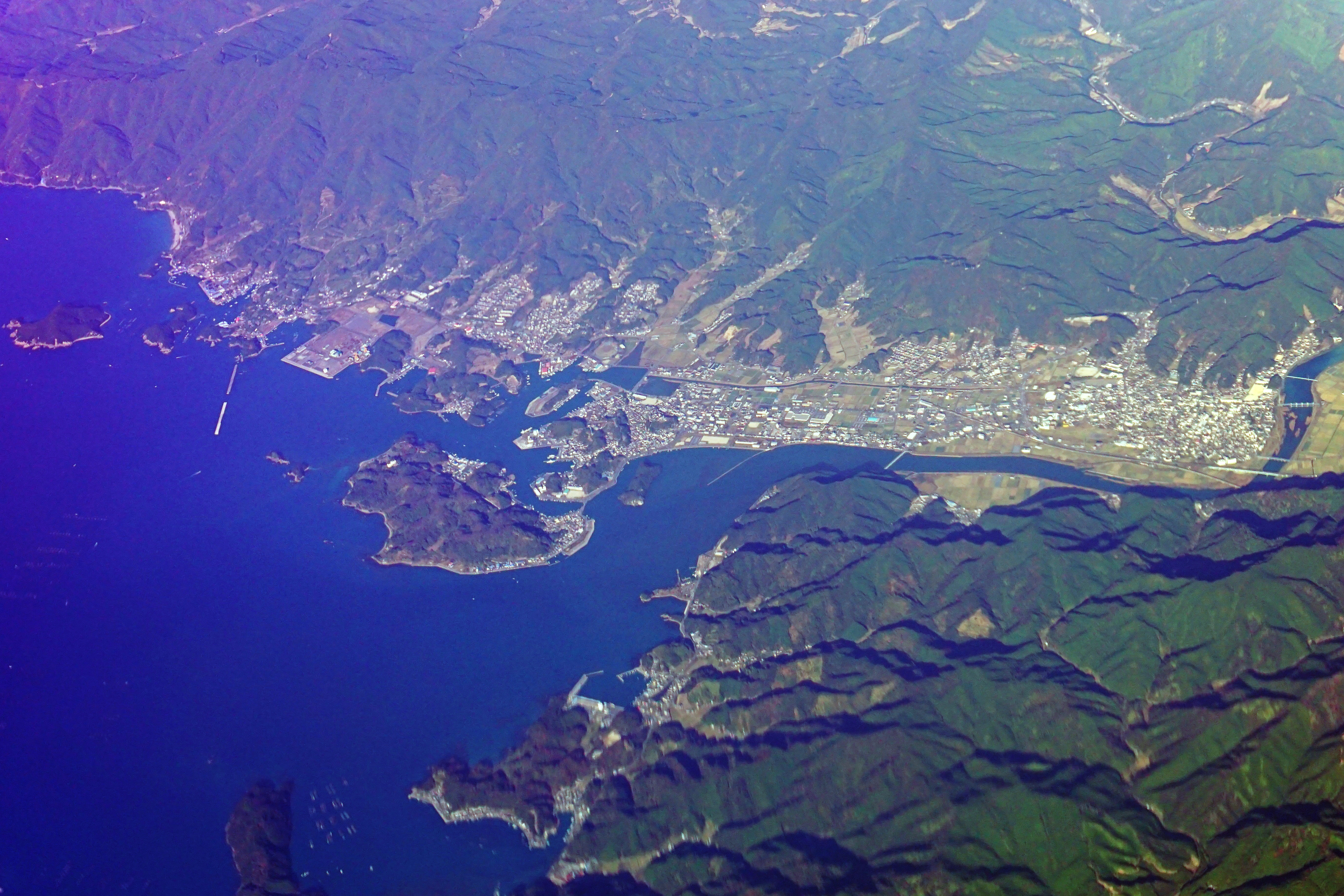
Aerial view of Sukumo Bay

Sukumo (宿毛市, Sukumo-shi) is a city located in Kōchi Prefecture, Japan. As of 31 July 2022, the city had an estimated population of 19,292 in 9,966 households, and a population density of 67 persons per km^{2}. The total area of the city is 286.20 square kilometres (110.50 sq mi).

== Geography ==
Sukumo is located in far western Kochi Prefecture on the island of Shikoku. The islands of Okinoshima and Urugushima are within Sukomo city limits despite being geographically closer to neighboring Ōtsuki; these are the only inhabited islands located fully within the prefecture. Parts of the city are within the borders of the Ashizuri-Uwakai National Park.

=== Neighbouring municipalities ===
Ehime Prefecture

- Ainan
- Uwajima

Kōchi Prefecture

- Mihara
- Ōtsuki
- Shimanto City
- Tosashimizu

=== Climate ===
Sukumo has a humid subtropical climate (Köppen climate classification Cfa) with hot, humid summers and cool winters. There is significant precipitation throughout the year, especially during June and July. The average annual temperature in Sukumo is 17.2 °C (63.0 °F). The average annual rainfall is 2,093.1 mm (82.41 in) with June as the wettest month. The temperatures are highest on average in August, at around 27.4 °C (81.3 °F), and lowest in January, at around 7.4 °C (45.3 °F). The highest temperature ever recorded in Sukumo was 39.5 °C (103.1 °F) on 15 August 2020; the coldest temperature ever recorded was −5.3 °C (22.5 °F) on 27 February 1981.

Climate data for Sukumo (1991−2020 normals, extremes 1943−present)
Month	Jan	Feb	Mar	Apr	May	Jun	Jul	Aug	Sep	Oct	Nov	Dec	Year
Record high °C (°F)	22.4 (72.3)	23.1 (73.6)	26.4 (79.5)	27.8 (82.0)	32.7 (90.9)	33.4 (92.1)	37.3 (99.1)	39.5 (103.1)	35.9 (96.6)	32.4 (90.3)	27.6 (81.7)	24.3 (75.7)	39.5 (103.1)
Mean maximum °C (°F)	17.8 (64.0)	19.4 (66.9)	21.6 (70.9)	25.1 (77.2)	28.7 (83.7)	30.4 (86.7)	34.3 (93.7)	34.9 (94.8)	32.5 (90.5)	28.8 (83.8)	24.0 (75.2)	19.8 (67.6)	35.7 (96.3)
Mean daily maximum °C (°F)	11.6 (52.9)	12.7 (54.9)	15.8 (60.4)	20.1 (68.2)	23.8 (74.8)	25.8 (78.4)	29.7 (85.5)	31.1 (88.0)	28.5 (83.3)	24.2 (75.6)	19.1 (66.4)	14.0 (57.2)	21.4 (70.5)
Daily mean °C (°F)	7.4 (45.3)	8.2 (46.8)	11.2 (52.2)	15.6 (60.1)	19.5 (67.1)	22.6 (72.7)	26.4 (79.5)	27.4 (81.3)	24.6 (76.3)	19.6 (67.3)	14.5 (58.1)	9.4 (48.9)	17.2 (63.0)
Mean daily minimum °C (°F)	3.3 (37.9)	3.8 (38.8)	6.6 (43.9)	11.0 (51.8)	15.4 (59.7)	19.6 (67.3)	23.7 (74.7)	24.4 (75.9)	21.3 (70.3)	15.7 (60.3)	10.3 (50.5)	5.3 (41.5)	13.4 (56.0)
Mean minimum °C (°F)	−1.0 (30.2)	−1.0 (30.2)	0.3 (32.5)	4.1 (39.4)	10.1 (50.2)	15.3 (59.5)	20.4 (68.7)	21.4 (70.5)	16.0 (60.8)	9.7 (49.5)	4.1 (39.4)	0.5 (32.9)	−1.6 (29.1)
Record low °C (°F)	−5.0 (23.0)	−5.3 (22.5)	−3.7 (25.3)	−0.2 (31.6)	5.0 (41.0)	11.3 (52.3)	15.7 (60.3)	16.3 (61.3)	10.0 (50.0)	4.5 (40.1)	−0.1 (31.8)	−3.3 (26.1)	−5.3 (22.5)
Average precipitation mm (inches)	65.1 (2.56)	90.4 (3.56)	135.9 (5.35)	157.0 (6.18)	194.6 (7.66)	328.6 (12.94)	275.1 (10.83)	245.3 (9.66)	254.3 (10.01)	168.3 (6.63)	102.2 (4.02)	76.3 (3.00)	2,093.1 (82.41)
Average snowfall cm (inches)	2 (0.8)	2 (0.8)	0 (0)	0 (0)	0 (0)	0 (0)	0 (0)	0 (0)	0 (0)	0 (0)	0 (0)	trace	4 (1.6)
Average precipitation days (≥ 1.0 mm)	7.2	8.2	10.7	9.4	9.2	13.7	10.8	9.6	11.3	7.8	7.2	6.8	111.9
Average snowy days (≥ 1 cm)	0.5	0.5	0	0	0	0	0	0	0	0	0	0.1	1.1
Average relative humidity (%)	63	63	65	67	72	80	80	78	77	73	70	66	71
Mean monthly sunshine hours	155.8	159.8	184.5	194.4	194.8	134.4	196.6	221.0	173.3	182.2	163.1	153.5	2,115.5
Source: Japan Meteorological Agency

== Demographics ==
Per Japanese census data, the population of Sukumo in 2020 is 19,033 people. Sukumo has been conducting censuses since 1920.

Historical population
Year	Pop.	±%
1920	21,484	—
1925	21,895	+1.9%
1930	22,396	+2.3%
1935	22,995	+2.7%
1940	23,811	+3.5%
1945	30,454	+27.9%
1950	31,606	+3.8%
1955	31,773	+0.5%
1960	30,016	−5.5%
1965	26,992	−10.1%
1970	25,028	−7.3%
1975	25,340	+1.2%
1980	26,080	+2.9%
1985	26,255	+0.7%
1990	25,828	−1.6%
1995	25,919	+0.4%
2000	25,970	+0.2%
2005	24,397	−6.1%
2010	22,610	−7.3%
2015	20,907	−7.5%
2020	19,033	−9.0%
Sukumo population statistics

== History ==
As with all of Kōchi Prefecture, the area of Sukumo was part of ancient Tosa Province. During the Edo period, the area was part of the holdings of Tosa Domain ruled by the Yamauchi clan from their seat at Kōchi Castle, and Sukumo itself was a castle town centered on an outlying fortification of the domain. Following the Meiji restoration, the village of Sukumo within Hata District, Kōchi with the creation of the modern municipalities system on April 1, 1889. It was elevated to town status on December 20, 1899. On March 31, 1954, Tsukumo merged with the neighboring town of Kozukuchi and the villages of Hashigama, Hirata, Yamana, and Okinoshima to form the city of Sukumo.

== Government ==
Sukumo has a mayor-council form of government with a directly elected mayor and a unicameral city council of 14 members. Sukumo, together with Ōtsuki and Mihara contributes two members to the Kōchi Prefectural Assembly. In terms of national politics, the city is part of Kōchi 2nd district of the lower house of the Diet of Japan.

== Economy ==
Sukumo is a regional commercial center, with a local economy is dominated by agriculture, forestry and commercial fishing.

== Education ==
Sukumo City has eight public elementary schools and six public middle schools operated by the city government, and two public high schools operated by the Kōchi Prefectural Board of Education. Kōchi Prefecture and Ehime Prefecture also jointly one middle and one high school.

== Transportation ==
=== Railway ===
Tosa Kuroshio Railway Sukumo Line

- Kōgyōdanchi - Hirata - Higashi-Sukumo - Sukumo

=== Highway ===
- National Route 56
- National Route 321

== Local attractions ==
- Enkōji, the 39th temple in the Shikoku Pilgrimage
- Sukumo Shell Mound, a National Historic Site

== Noted people from Sukumo ==
- Azusa Ono, intellectual, jurist and politician during the Meiji era.
- Hayashi Yūzō, politician and cabinet minister in the pre-war Empire of Japan.

== Gallery ==
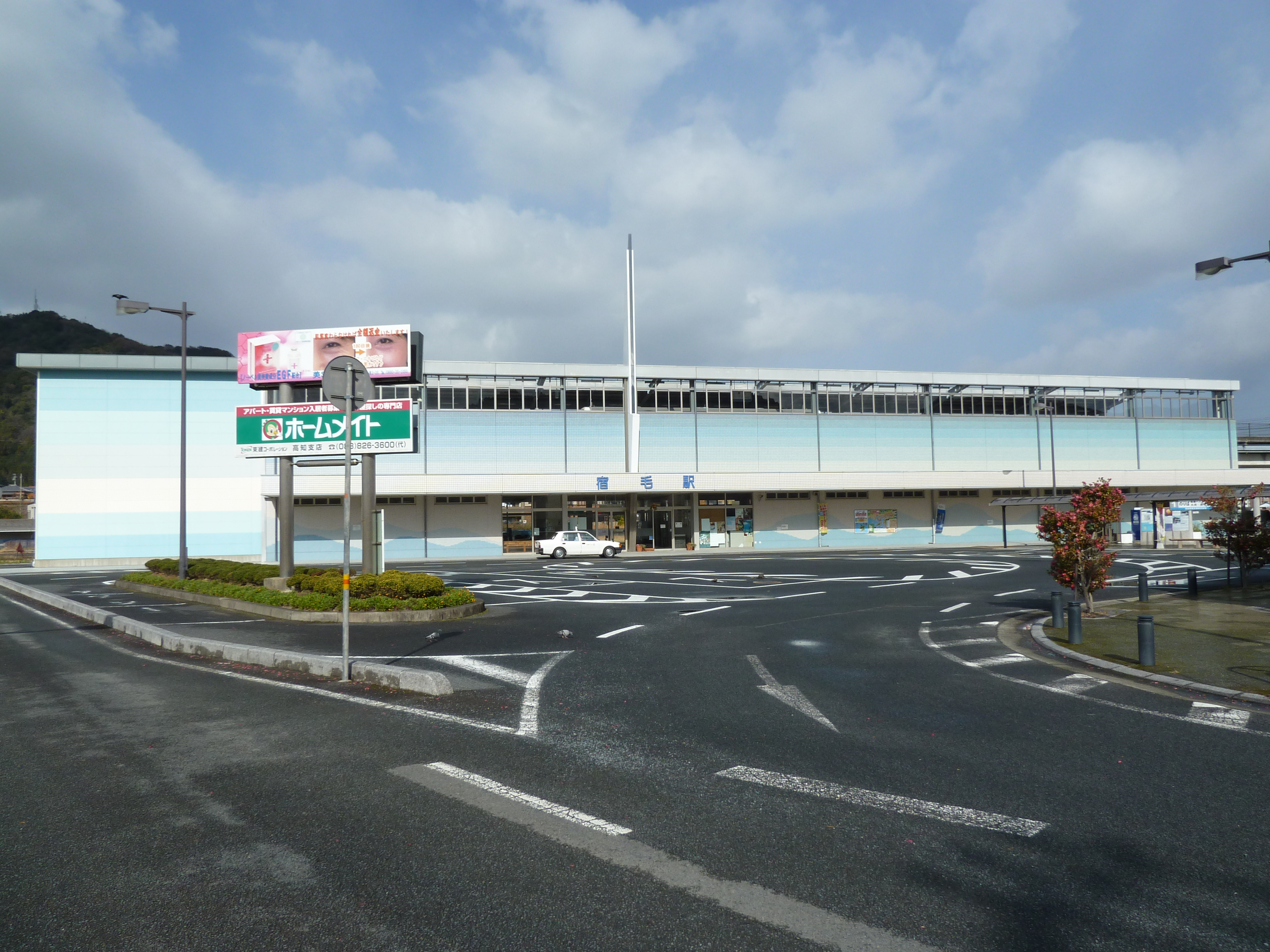
Sukumo station

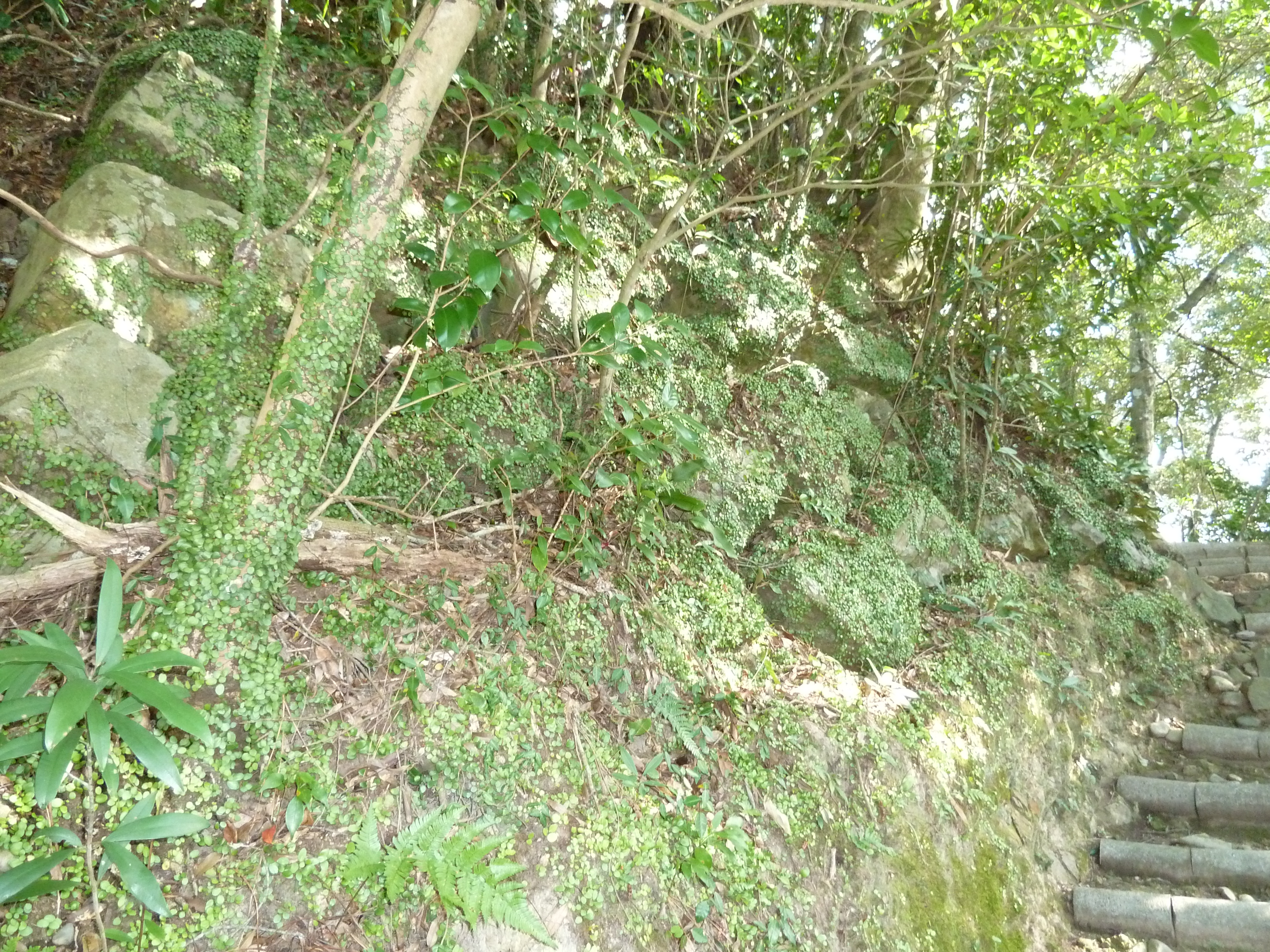
Stone wall of Sukumo castle

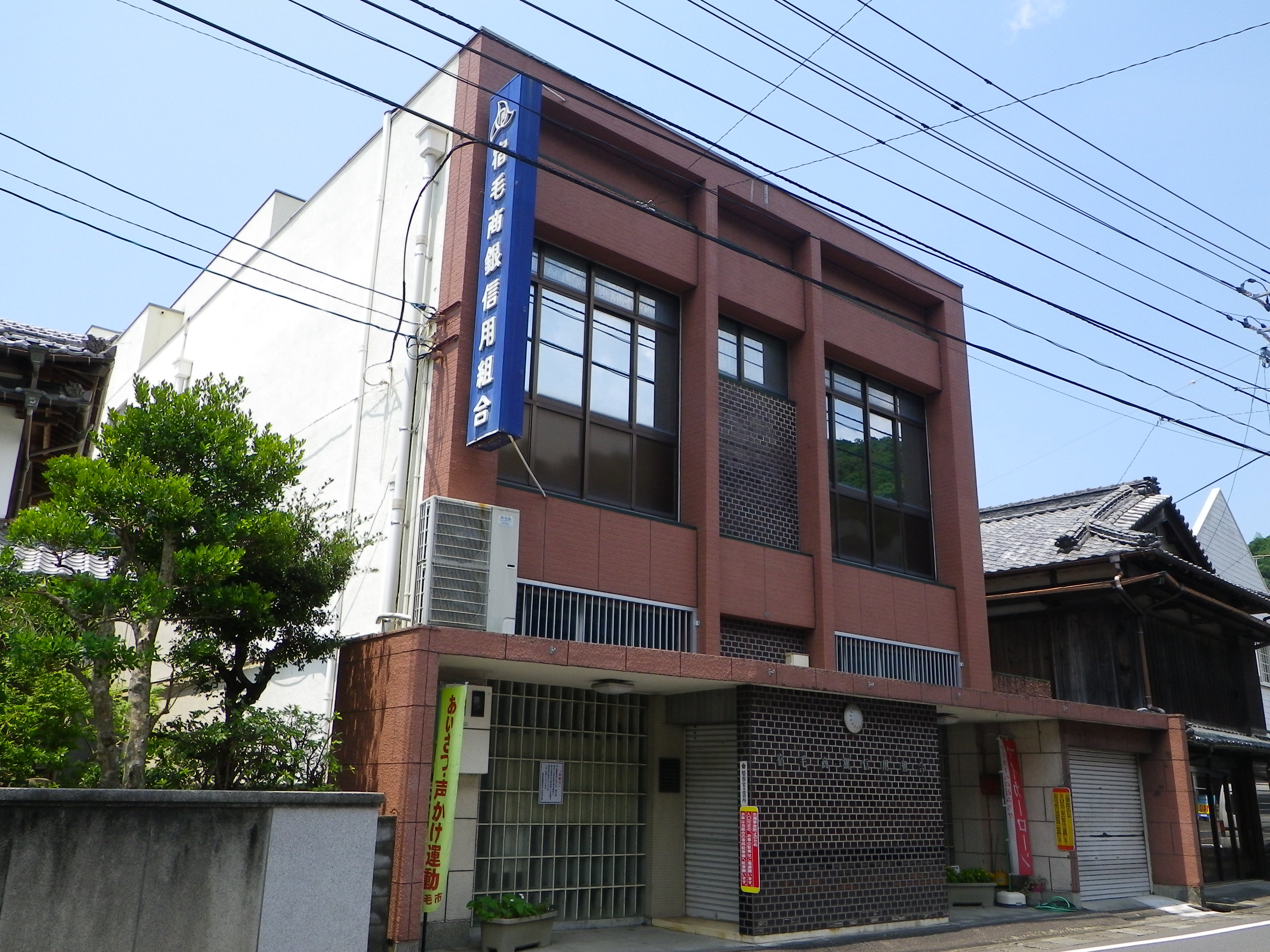
Sukumo Credit union

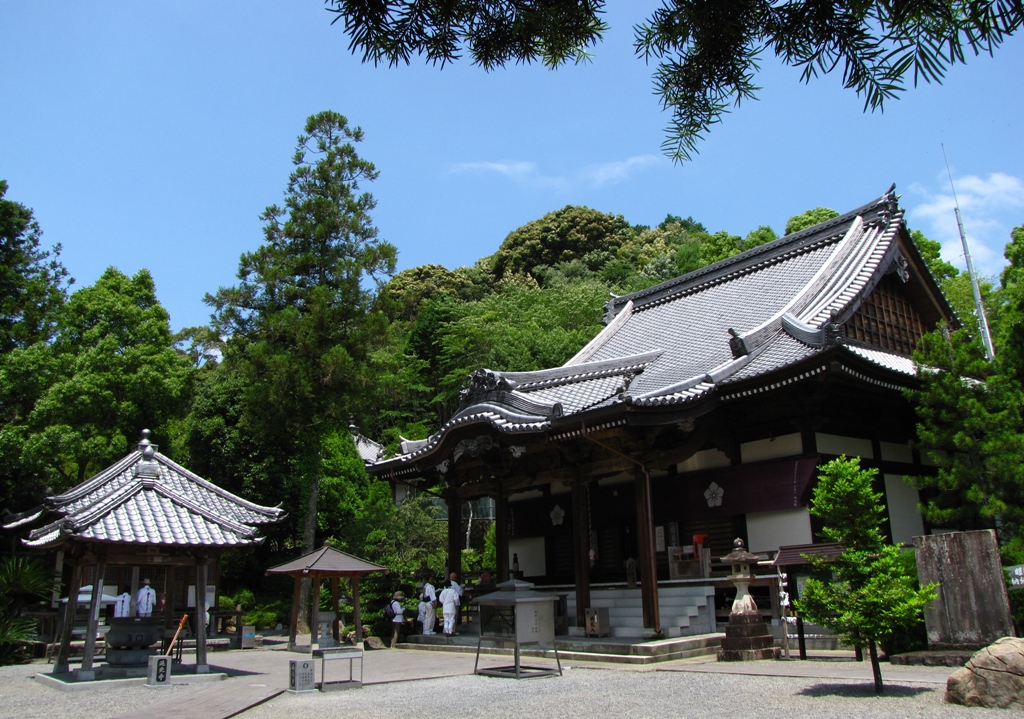
Enkō-ji
