= Enkōji =

Buddhist temple in Kōchi Prefecture, Japan

Coordinates: 32.961306°N 132.774056°E

Enkōji 延光寺
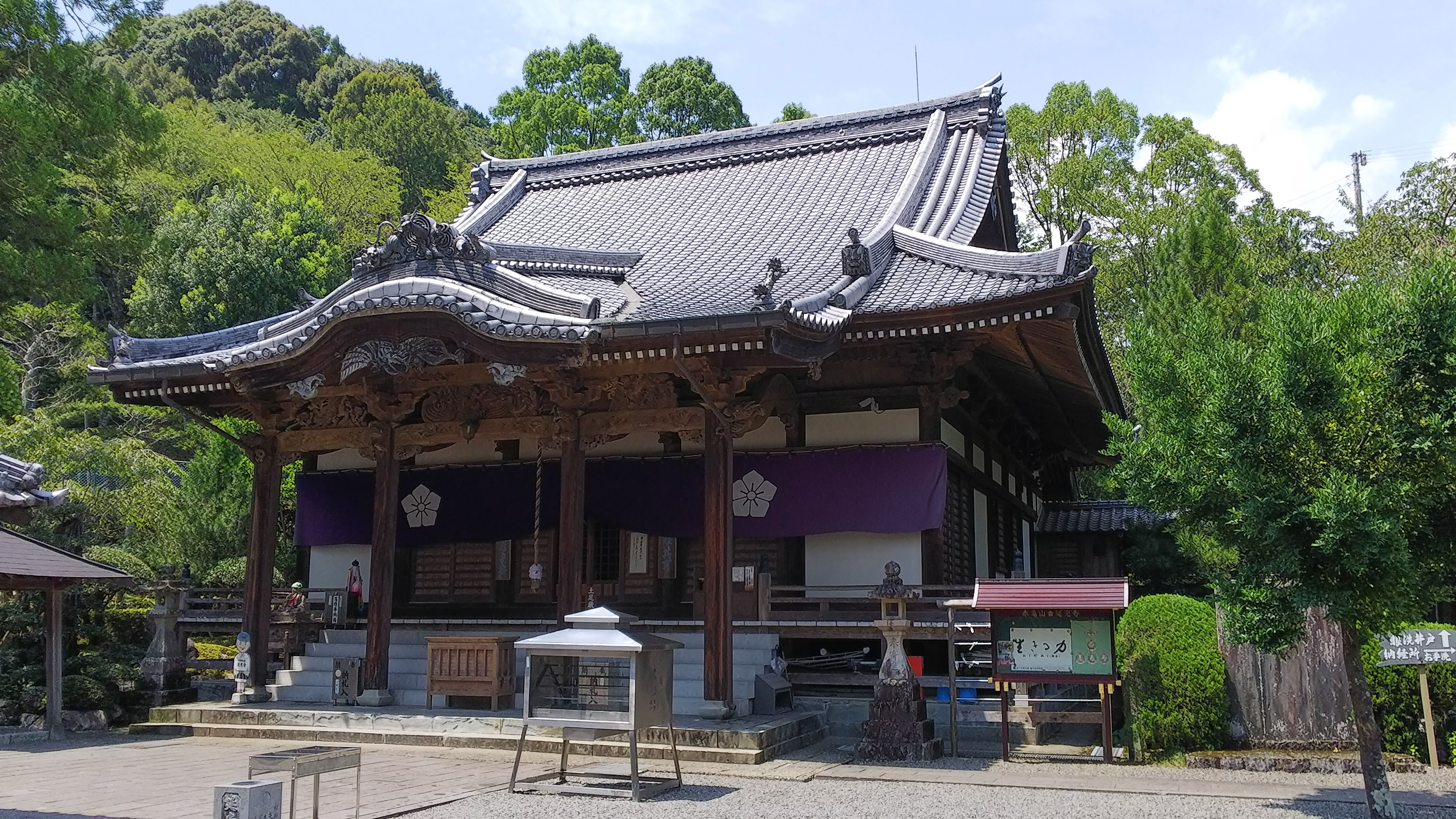
- Hondō of Enkōji

Religion
- Affiliation: Shingon, Chisan sect
- Deity: Yakushi Nyorai

Location
- Location: Sukumo, Kōchi-ken
- Country: Japan
- Interactive map of Enkōji 延光寺

Architecture
- Founder: Gyōki
- Completed: 724

Enkōji (延光寺) is a Chisan Shingon temple in Sukumo, Kōchi Prefecture, Japan. Temple 39 on the Shikoku 88 temple pilgrimage, the main image is of Yakushi Nyorai, the Buddha of healing and medicine. The temple is said to have been founded by Gyōki in the first year of the Jinki era.

== History ==
Gyōki founded Enkōji in 724 after receiving an imperial command by Emperor Shōmu who had an interest in establishing a system of provincial temples in Japan. Gyōki carved a wooden statue of the deity Yakushi Nyorai which he designated as a honzon of the temple. In 911, a red turtle (赤亀, shakki) climbed up to the temple grounds from the sea carrying a Buddhist temple bell on its back. Statues of this turtle can now be seen throughout the temple grounds along with images of the various deities that represent Enkōji. Enkōji can also be referred to as Shakkizan (赤亀山) and Jisannin (寺山院).

== Buildings ==
- Hondō, early Jinki period
- Sanmon: Niōmon (仁王門)
- Shōrō
- Gomadō (護摩堂): Shrine within the temple grounds to conduct Goma rituals to ask for blessing from deities. Goma is conducted by burning cedar sticks available for purchase next to the gomadō.
- Eye cleansing well (根洗いの井戸)： It is said that in 795, Kōbō-Daishi (弘法大師) used a Khakkhara to break open the ground and pull water up to the surface of the earth to save the nearby villagers suffering from severe droughts. The remaining hole has been turned into a well, and is now known as the “eye cleansing well”.
- Red turtle and bell statue (赤亀と梵鐘の像)
- Japanese rock garden
- Japanese pond and stream garden (池泉式庭園): Traditional Japanese garden style that has a pond and stream as the center point of the garden. At Enkōji, a statue of a turtle emerging from the pond is the main attraction of this garden.

== Treasures ==
- Bronze bell (銅鐘) (911) (Important Cultural Property): 33 cm tall, 25.2 cm circumference, 23.5 cm diameter (at the mouth of the bell). The oldest Buddhist temple bell in all of Kochi Prefecture.
- Wooden Yakushi Nyorai, Nikkō bosatsu, and Gakkō bosatsu statues (Sukumo City Designated Tangible Cultural Property ICP)
- Chinese juniper tree (Sukumo City Designated Natural Monument ICP): Estimated 400 years old. Designated an ICP by Sukumo City on July 24, 1963.

== Gallery ==
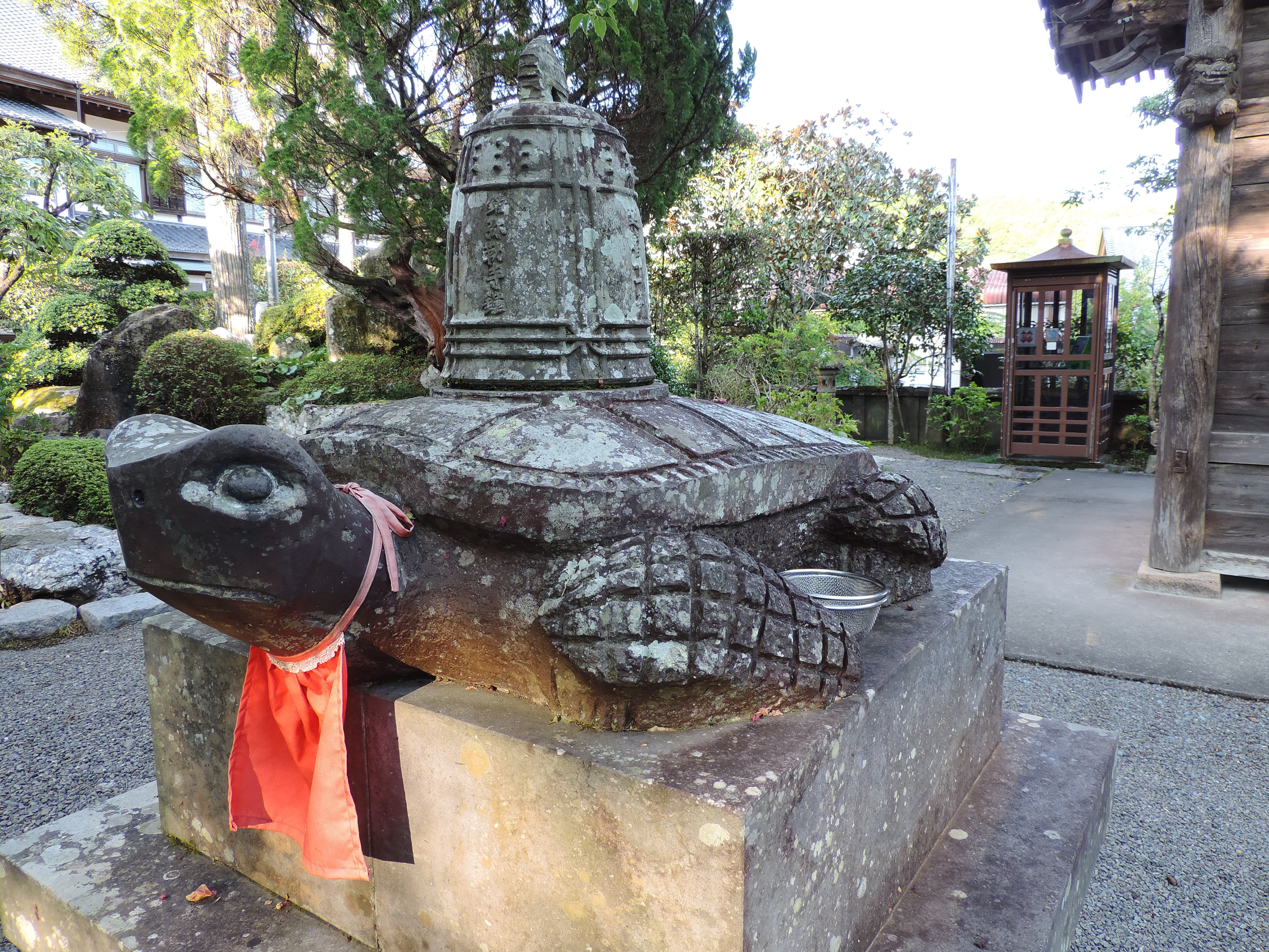
Statue of a red turtle carrying a bell on its back

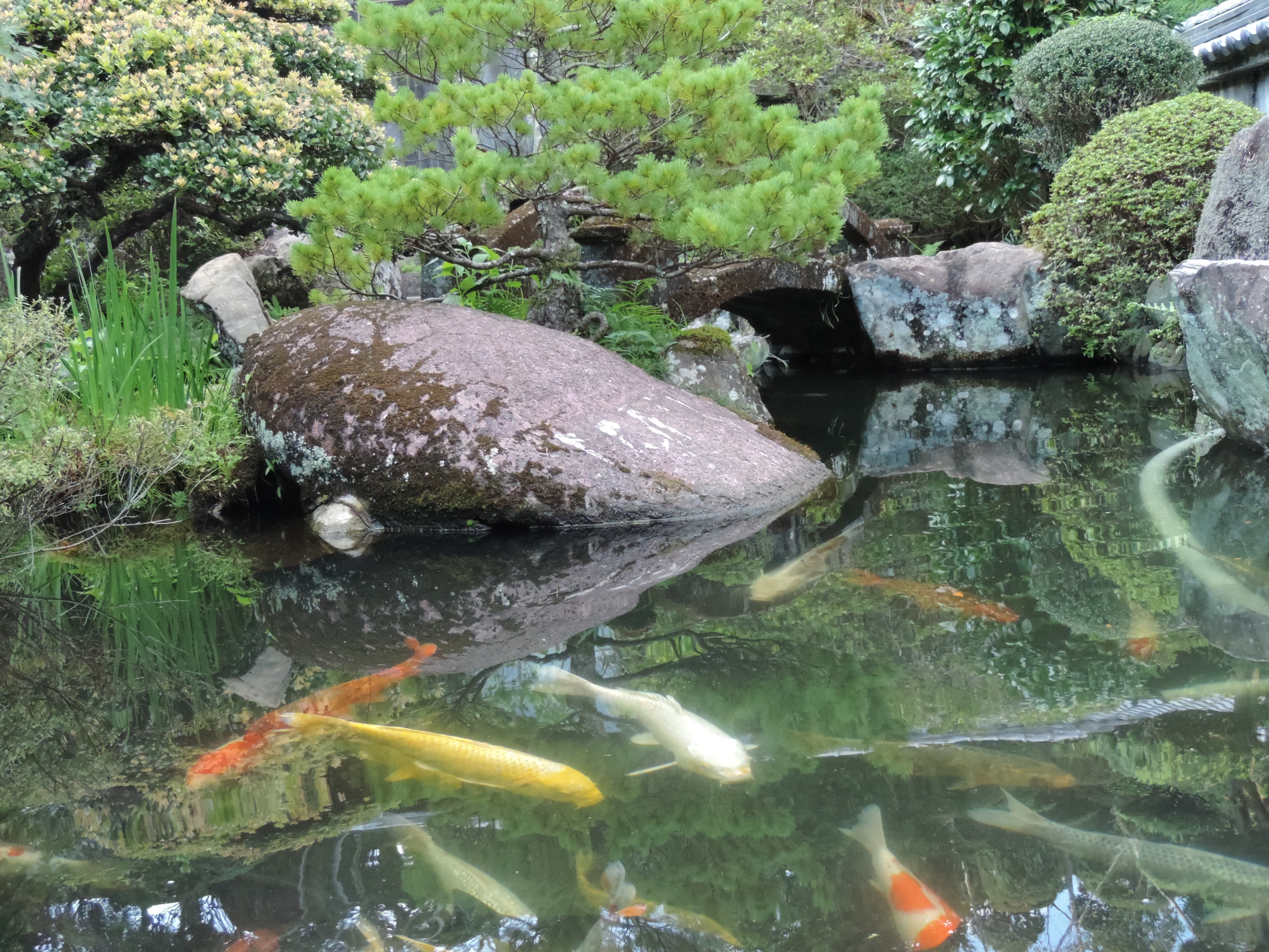
Statue of a red turtle emerging from a pond

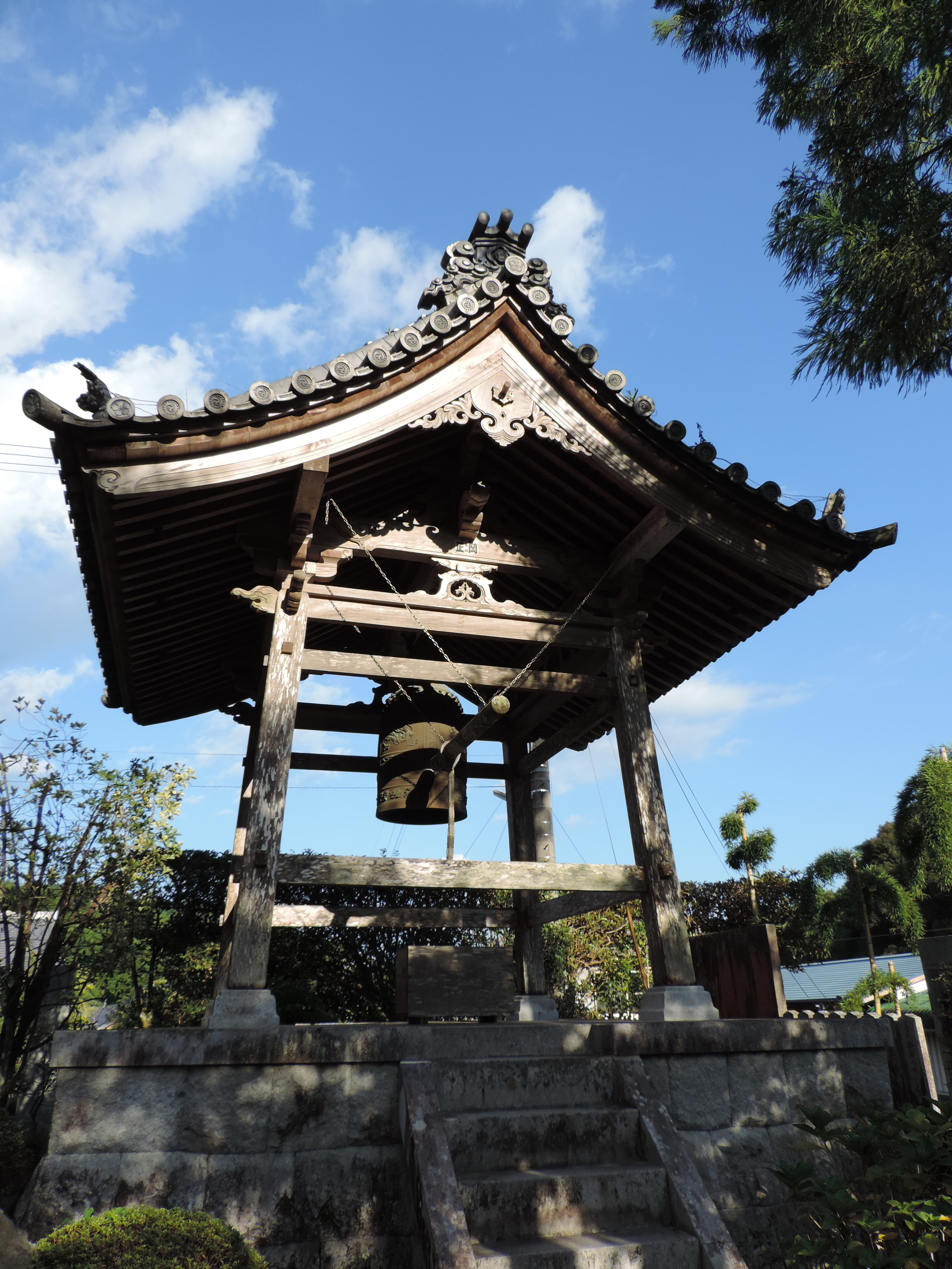
Shōrō next to the entrance of Enkōji

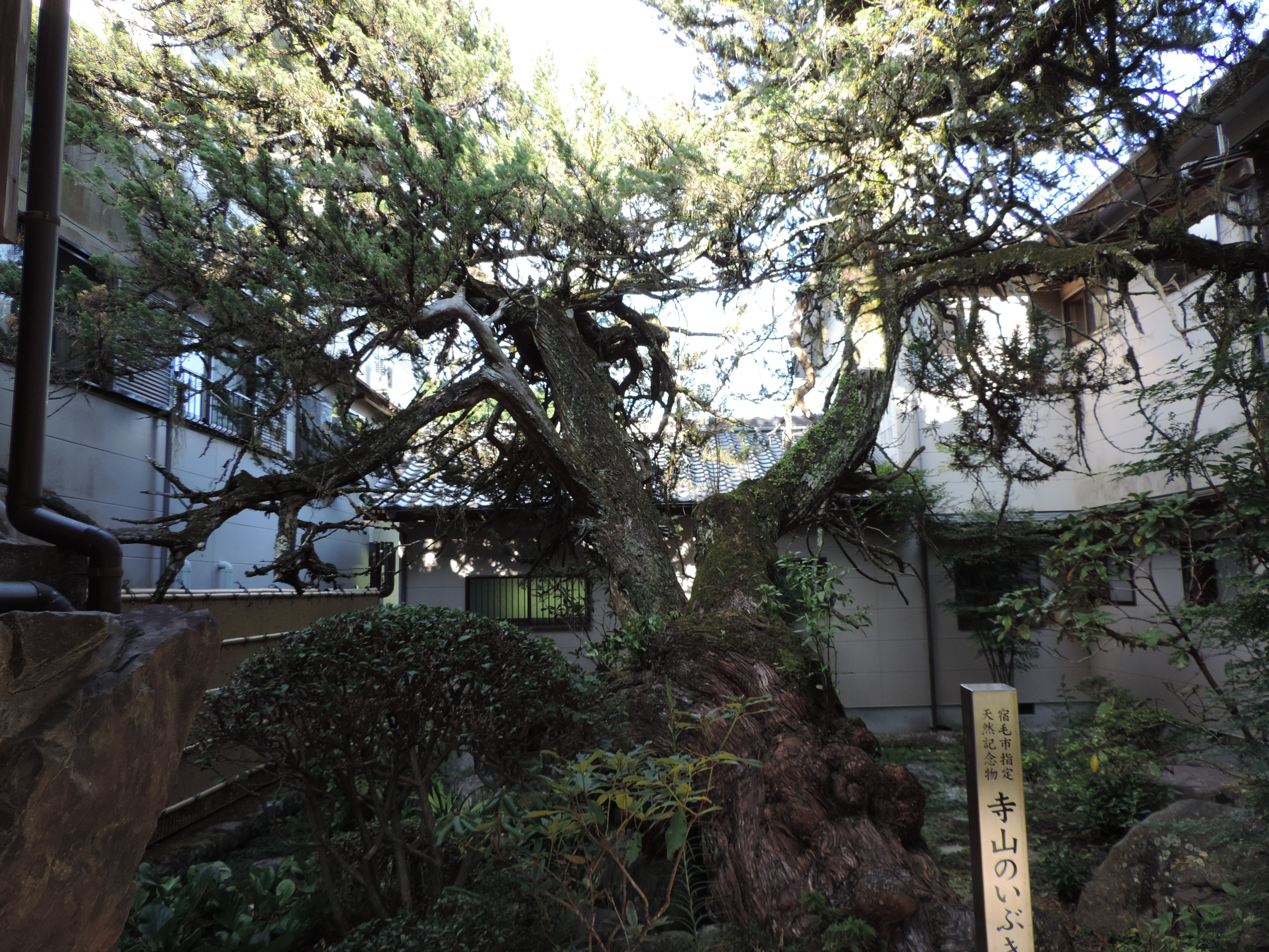
400-year-old juniper tree designated a Natural Monument of the community

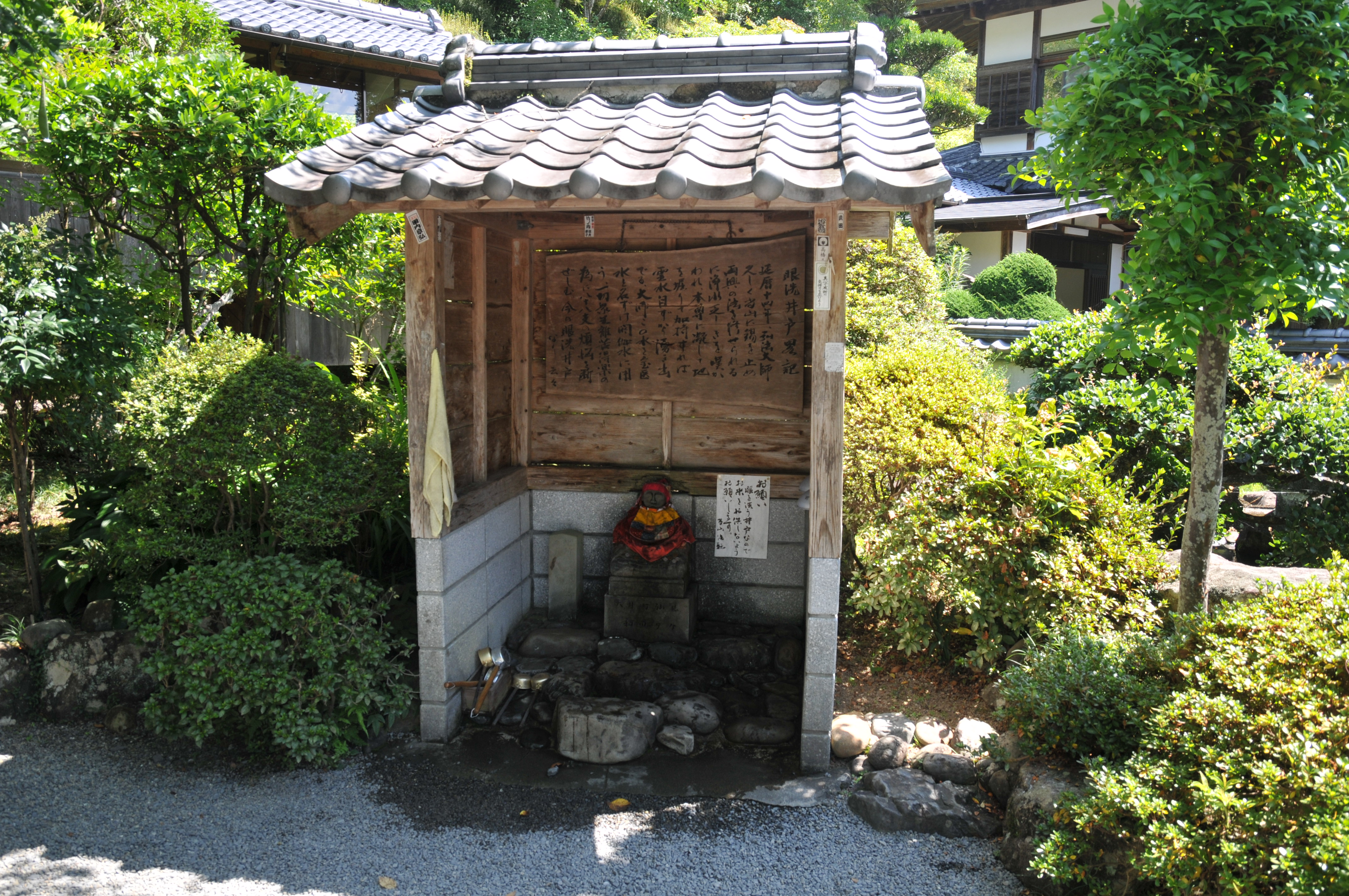
Eye cleansing well

== See also ==
- Shikoku 88 Temple Pilgrimage
