= Sukumo Line =

Railway line in Kochi Prefecture, Japan

Tosa Kuroshio Railway Sukumo Line
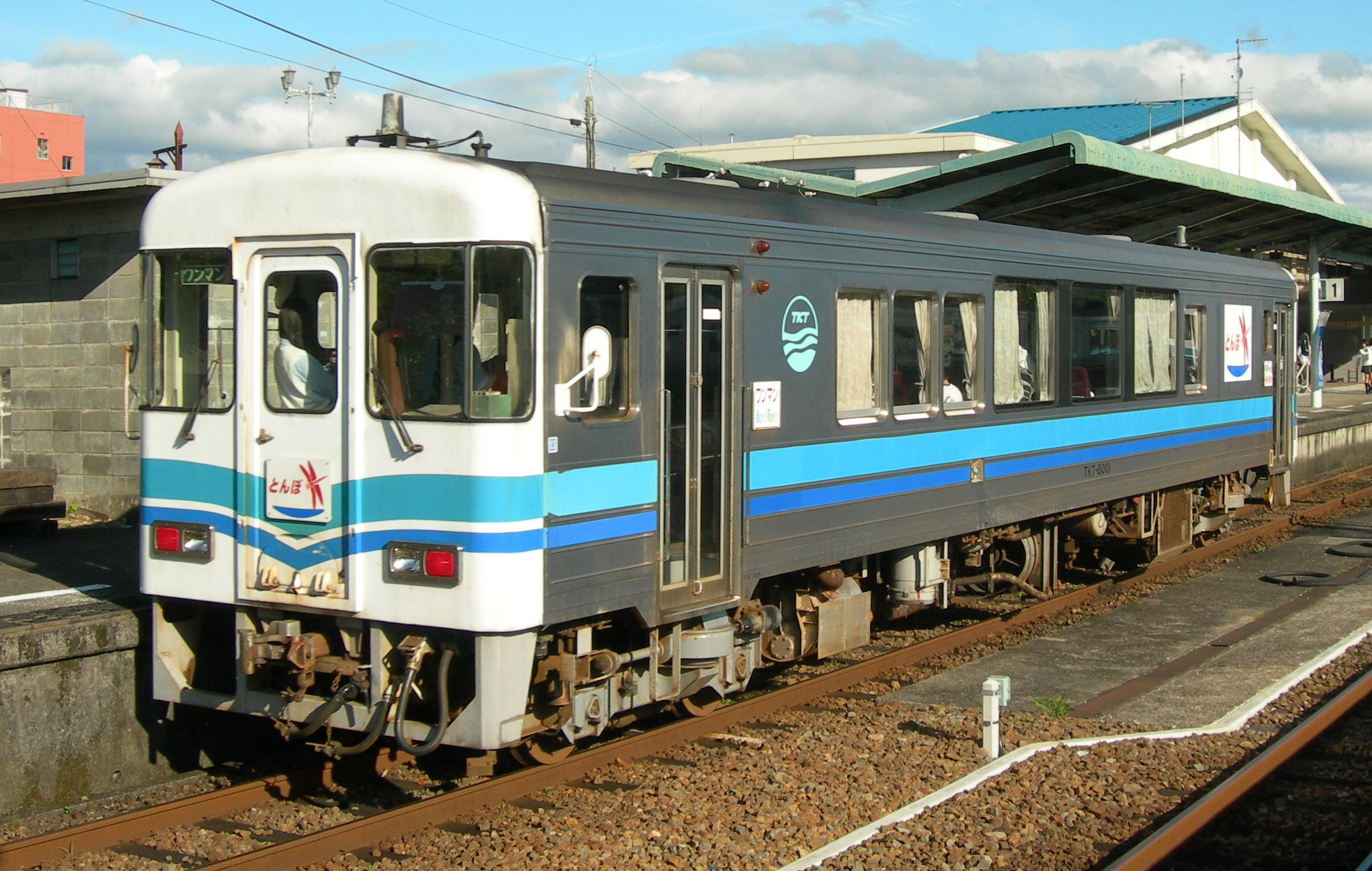
- A Tosa Kuroshio Railway DMU at Nakamura Station, May 2010

Overview
- Native name: 土佐くろしお鉄道宿毛線
- Status: Operational
- Owner: Tosa Kuroshio Railway
- Locale: Kōchi Prefecture
- Termini: Nakamura; Sukumo
- Stations: 8

Service
- Type: Regional rail
- Operator(s): Tosa Kuroshio Railway
- Rolling stock: TKT-8000 series DMU, JR Shikoku 2000 series DMU, JR Shikoku 2700 series DMU

History
- Opened: 1 October 1997; 28 years ago

Technical
- Line length: 23.6 km (14.7 mi)
- Number of tracks: Entire line single tracked
- Character: Rural
- Track gauge: 1,067 mm (3 ft 6 in)
- Minimum radius: 350 m
- Electrification: None
- Operating speed: 120 km/h (75 mph)

The Tosa Kuroshio Railway Sukumo Line (土佐くろしお鉄道宿毛線, Tosa Kuroshio Railway Sukumo-sen) is a 23.6 km Japanese railway line operated by the third-sector railway operator Tosa Kuroshio Railway. It connects Nakamura Station in the city of Shimanto with Sukumo Station in the city of Sukumo in Kōchi Prefecture.

== Stations ==
No.	Name	Japanese	Distance (km)	Transfers	Location	
TK40	Nakamura	中村	0.0	Tosa Kuroshio Railway Nakamura Line (TK40)	Shimanto	Kōchi Prefecture
TK41	Gudō	具同	3.2		Shimanto	Kōchi Prefecture
TK42	Kunimi	国見	6.2		Shimanto	Kōchi Prefecture
TK43	Arioka	有岡	11.6		Shimanto	Kōchi Prefecture
TK44	Kōgyōdanchi	工業団地	14.7		Sukumo	Kōchi Prefecture
TK45	Hirata	平田	15.3		Sukumo	Kōchi Prefecture
TK46	Higashi-Sukumo	東宿毛	22.2		Sukumo	Kōchi Prefecture
TK47	Sukumo	宿毛	23.6		Sukumo	Kōchi Prefecture

== History ==
The Tosa Kuroshio Railway was established on 8 May 1986 for the purpose of resuming construction of the Sukumo and Asa lines, which had been planned by JNR but abandoned. The company acquired a license to operate the Sukumo Line in February 1987, and commenced construction of the line, which opened on 1 October 1997.

== See also ==
- List of railway lines in Japan
