= Sukumo Station =

Railway station in Sukumo, Kōchi Prefecture, Japan

Sukumo Station 宿毛駅
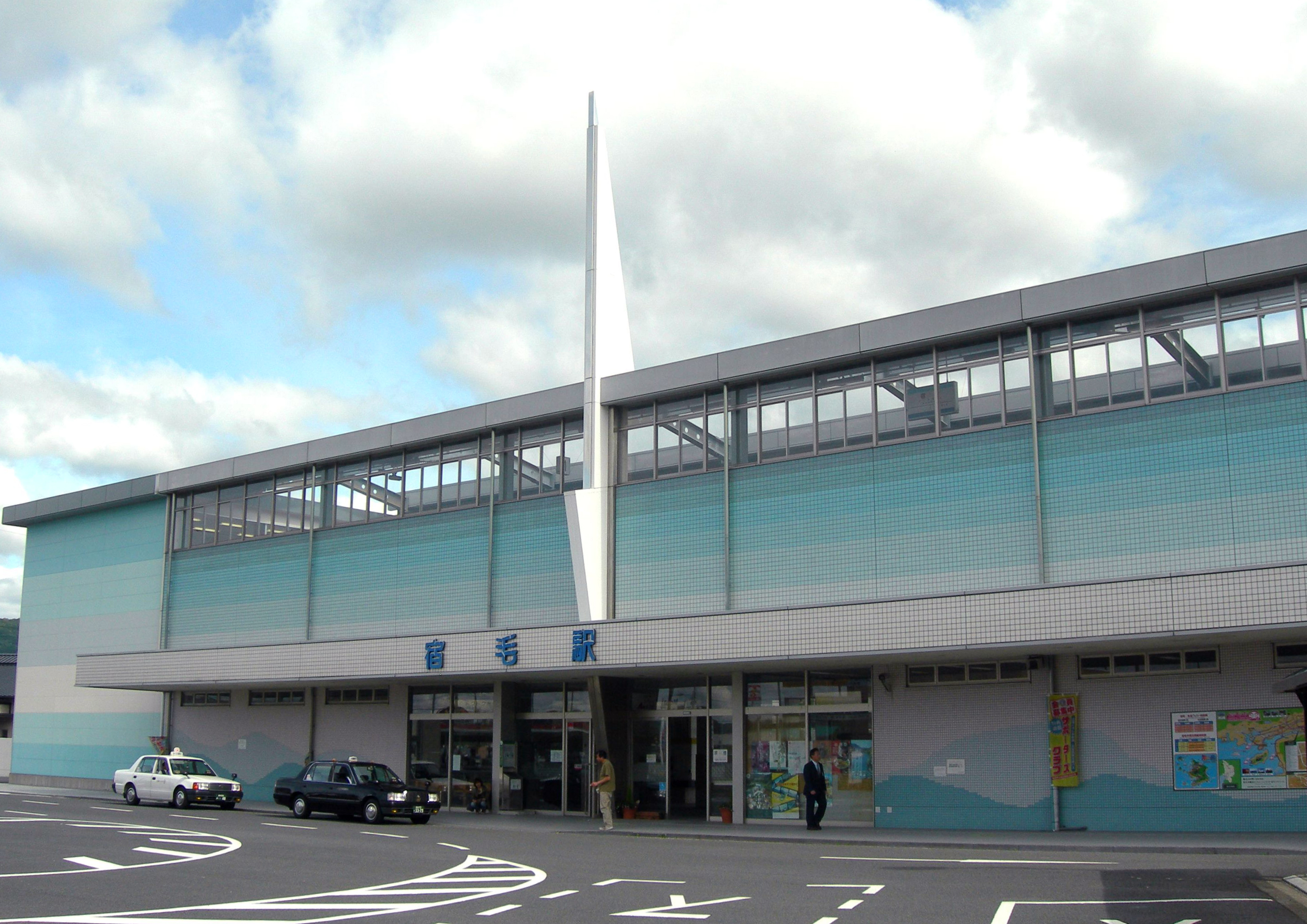
- Sukumo Station, May 2010

General information
- Location: 1–703 Ekimae-chō, Sukumo, Kōchi-shi, Kōchi-ken 788-0010; Japan
- Coordinates: 32°55′57″N 132°42′49″E
- Operator: Tosa Kuroshio Railway
- Line: Tosa Kuroshio Railway Sukumo Line
- Distance: 23.6 km from Nakamura
- Platforms: 2 bay platforms
- Connections: Bus stop

Other information
- Station code: TK47

History
- Opened: 1 October 1997

Passengers
- FY2019: 413
Location
- Location within Kochi Prefecture Location within Japan

Sukumo Station (宿毛駅, Sukumo-eki) is a passenger railway station located in the city of Sukumo, Kōchi Prefecture, Japan. It is operated by the third-sector Tosa Kuroshio Railway. and has the station number "TK47".

== Lines ==
Sukumo Station is a terminus of the Tosa Kuroshio Railway Sukumo Line, and is located 23.6 km from the opposing terminus of the line at Nakamura Station.

== Station layout ==
The elevated station consists of two bay platforms serving two terminating tracks. Stairs and an elevator connect the platforms to the station office on the ground floor. This station has a Midori no Madoguchi staffed ticket office.

== Adjacent stations ==
«	Service	»
Tosa Kuroshio Railway
Sukumo Line
Higashi-Sukumo	-	Terminus

== History ==
The station opened on 1 October 1997.

Services between Sukumo and Nakamura were suspended from 2 March 2005 following a collision. Local services only were resumed from 7 April 2005 between Higashi-Sukumo and Nakamura, and limited express services were restored from 13 June 2005. The line from Sukumo reopened on 1 November 2005.

== Surrounding area ==
- National Route 56
- National Route 321
- Sukumo Shell Mound

== See also ==
- List of railway stations in Japan
