= Tosa-Irino Station =

Railway station in Kuroshio, Kōchi Prefecture, Japan

Tosa-Irino Station 土佐入野駅
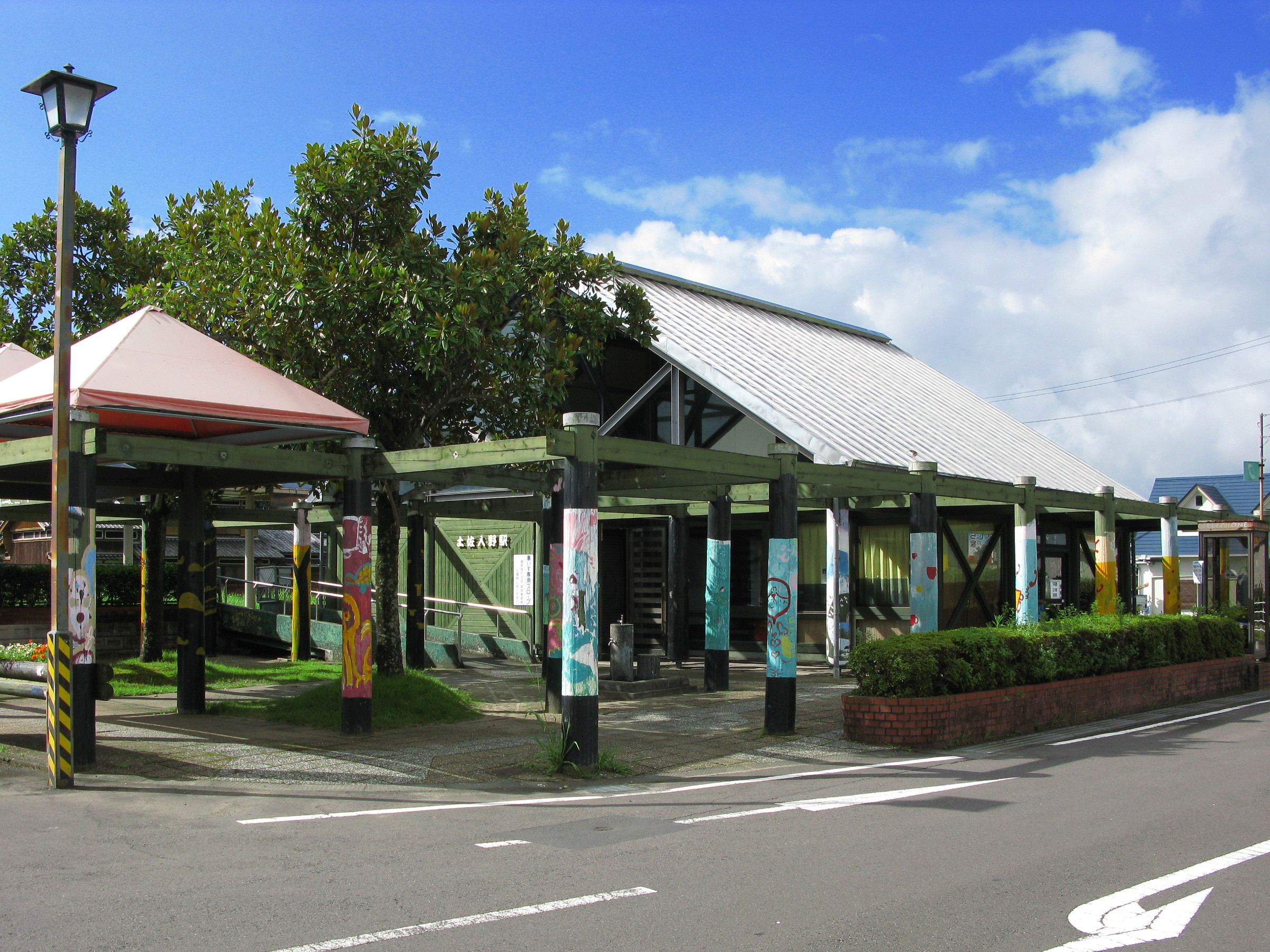
- Entrance of Tosa-irino Station

General information
- Location: Irino, Kuroshio-chō, Hata-gun, Kōchi-ken 789-1931; Japan
- Coordinates: 33°01′26″N 133°00′42″E
- Operator: Tosa Kuroshio Railway
- Line: Tosa Kuroshio Railway Nakamura Line
- Distance: 34.3 km from Kubokawa
- Platforms: 1
- Tracks: 1
- Connections: bus

Construction
- Parking: Available
- Cycle facilities: Bike shed
- Accessible: Yes

Other information
- Status: unstaffed
- Station code: TK37

History
- Opened: 1 October 1970

Passengers
- FY2018: 159 daily
Location
- Location within Kochi Prefecture Location within Japan

Tosa-Irino Station (土佐入野駅, Tosa-Irino-eki) is a passenger railway station located in the town of Kuroshio, Hata District, Kōchi Prefecture, Japan. It is operated by the Tosa Kuroshio Railway and has the station number "TK37".

== Lines and services ==
Tosa-Irino station is served by the Tosa Kuroshio Railway Nakamura Line, and is located 34.3 km from the starting point of the line at Kubokawa.

The station is also served by JR Shikoku Ashizuri limited express services from Nakamura and Sukumo to Kōchi and Nanpū limited express services Nakamura and Sukumo to Okayama.

== Layout ==
The station consists of a lodge type building with a side platform serving one track. The building has a waiting area, ticket vending machines, a cafe and a convenience store. A bus shelter is at the station entrance. Car parks and bicycle sheds are to one side of the station. A wheelchair ramp leads from the station entrance to the platform.

== Adjacent stations ==
«	Service	»
Tosa Kuroshio Railway
Nakamura Line
Ukibuchi	-	Nishi-Ōgata

== History ==
The station opened on 1 October 1970 under the control of Japanese National Railways (JNR). After the privatization of JNR, control of the station passed to Tosa Kuroshio Railway on 1 April 1988.

== Passenger statistics ==
In fiscal 2011, the station was used by an average of 262 passengers daily.

== Surrounding area ==
- The station is located in the urban centre of Ōgata which is part of the town of Kuroshio.
- Kuroshio town office - just down the road about 160 m away.
- National Route 56 - runs parallel to the track nearby and through the urban centre of Ogata.
- Irino fishing port (入野漁港) - point of departure for whale watching excursions.
- Tosa Southwest Large Scale Park, Ogata section (土佐西南大規模公園,大方町) - a recreational area with many sport facilities such as a gymnasium and tennis courts.
- Seaside art gallery (砂浜美術館) - an open-air art gallery set on a beach.

== See also ==
- List of railway stations in Japan
