= Kaina Station =

Railway station in Kuroshio, Kōchi Prefecture, Japan

Kaina Station 荷稲駅
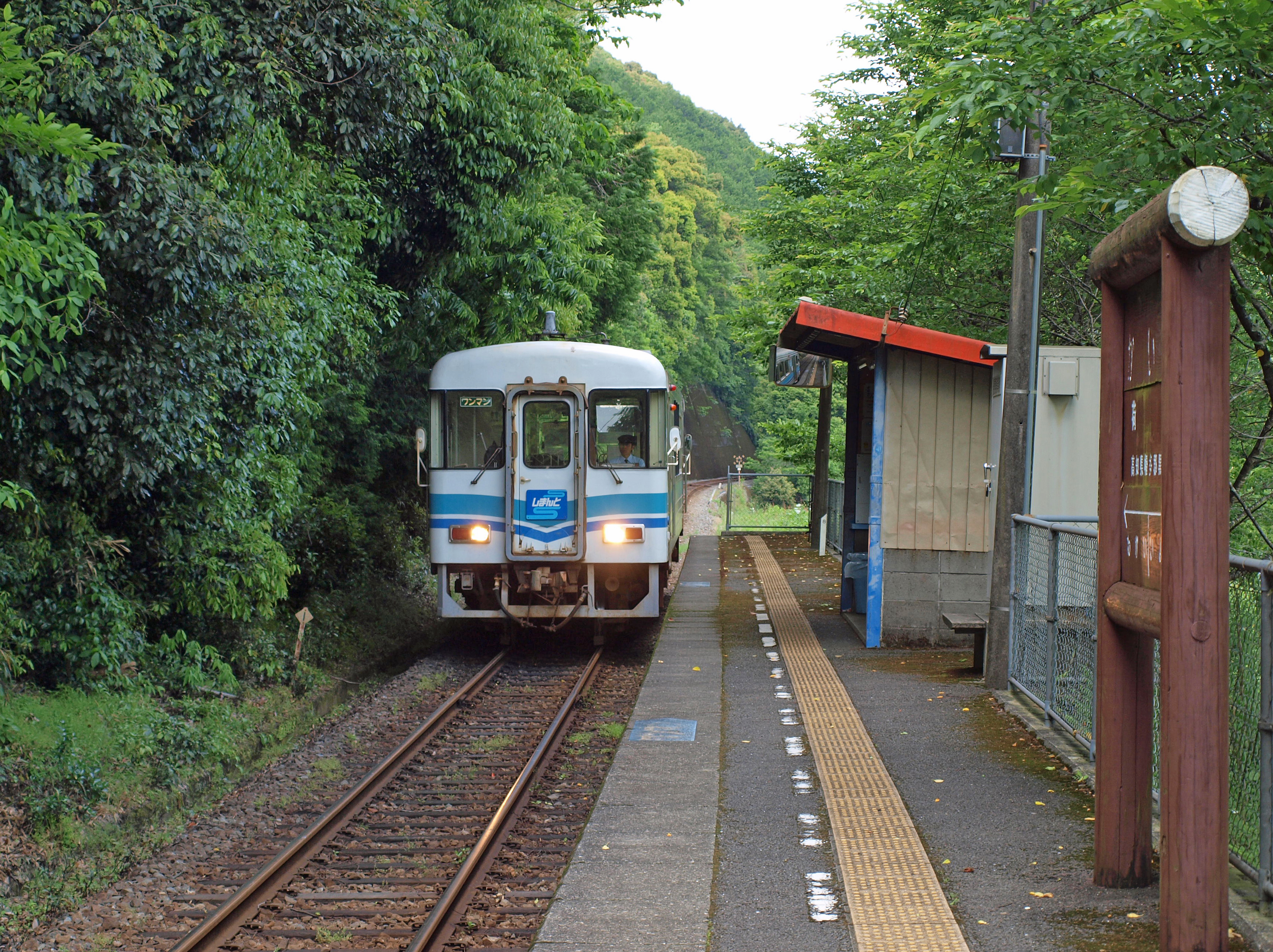
- Kaina Station in 2010

General information
- Location: Kaina, Kuroshio-cho, Hata-gun, Kōchi-ken 789-1705; Japan
- Coordinates: 33°07′59″N 133°06′59″E
- Operator: Tosa Kuroshio Railway
- Line: Tosa Kuroshio Railway Nakamura Line
- Distance: 13.8 km from Kubokawa
- Platforms: 1
- Tracks: 1

Construction
- Structure type: At grade (side hill cutting)
- Cycle facilities: Bike shed

Other information
- Status: Unstaffed
- Station code: TK28

History
- Opened: 18 December 1963

Passengers
- FY2019: 19
Location
- Location within Kochi Prefecture Location within Japan

Kaina Station (荷稲駅, Kaina-eki) is a passenger railway station located in the town of Kuroshio, Hata District, Kōchi Prefecture, Japan. It is operated by the Tosa Kuroshio Railway and has the station number "TK28".

== Lines and Trains ==
The station is served by the Tosa Kuroshio Railway Nakamura Line, and is located 13.8 km from the starting point of the line at Kubokawa. Only local trains stop at the station.

== Layout ==
The station consists of a side platform serving a single track on a side hill cutting. There is no station building and the station is unstaffed. A shelter is provided on the platform for waiting passengers. A bike shed has been set up near the station entrance.

== Adjacent stations ==
| « | Service | » |
Nakamura Line
| Wakai | Local | Iyoki |

== History ==
Japanese National Railways (JNR) opened the station on 18 December 1963 as an intermediate station when it laid down theNakamura Line from Kubokawa to Tosa-Saga. After the privatization of JNR, control of the station passed to Tosa Kuroshio Railway on 1 April 1988.

== Passenger statistics ==
In fiscal 2019, the station was used by an average of 19 passengers daily.

== Surrounding area ==
- Japan National Route 56
- Kuroshio Municipal Kennokawa Elementary School

== See also ==
- List of railway stations in Japan
