= Saga-Kōen Station =

Railway station in Kuroshio, Kōchi Prefecture, Japan

Saga-Kōen Station 佐賀公園駅
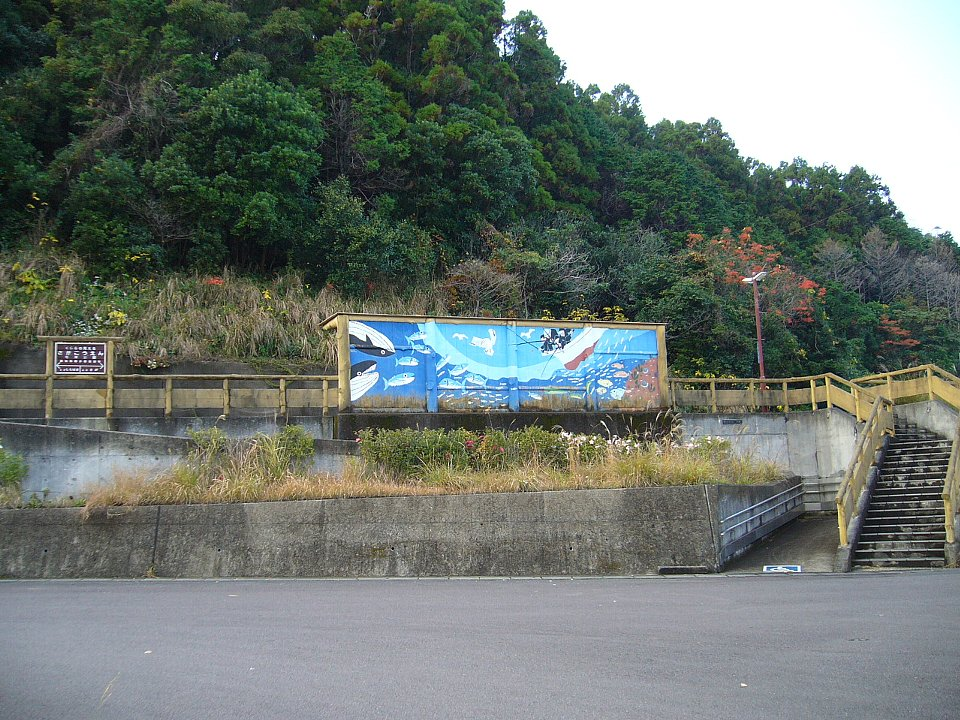
- Saga-Kōen station as seen from National Route 56

General information
- Location: Saga, Kuroshio, Hata District, Kochi 789-1720, Japan; Japan
- Coordinates: 33°03′53″N 133°06′24″E
- Operator: Tosa Kuroshio Railway
- Line: Tosa Kuroshio Railway Nakamura Line
- Platforms: 1
- Tracks: 1
- Connections: Bus stop

Construction
- Parking: None
- Cycle facilities: No bike shed
- Accessible: Yes - wheelchair ramp to platform

Other information
- Status: unstaffed
- Station code: TK31

Passengers
- FY2019: 4
Location
- Location within Kochi Prefecture Location within Japan

Saga-Kōen Station (佐賀公園駅, Saga-Kōen-eki), also known as "Saga Park Station" is a passenger railway station located in the town of Kuroshio, Hata District, Kōchi Prefecture, Japan. It is operated by the Tosa Kuroshio Railway and has the station number "TK31".

== Lines and services ==
The station is served by the Tosa Kuroshio Railway Nakamura Line, and is located 22.9 km from the starting point of the line at Kubokawa. Only local trains stop at the station.

== Layout ==
The station consists of a side platform serving a single track on a high embankment overlooking the adjacent main road. A flight of steps leads up to the platform. A wheelchair ramp is also provided. There is no station building, only a concrete shelter for waiting passengers.

== Adjacent stations ==
«	Service	»
Tosa Kuroshio Railway
Nakamura Line
Tosa-Saga	-	Tosa-Shirahama

== Surrounding area ==
- Japan National Route 56 runs next to the station.
- The Western part of the Tosa Southwest Large Scale Park Saga section (土佐西南大規模公園) is across the main road from the station exit.

== See also ==
- List of railway stations in Japan
