= Uminoōmukae Station =

Railway station in Kuroshio, Kōchi Prefecture, Japan

Uminoōmukae Station 海の王迎駅
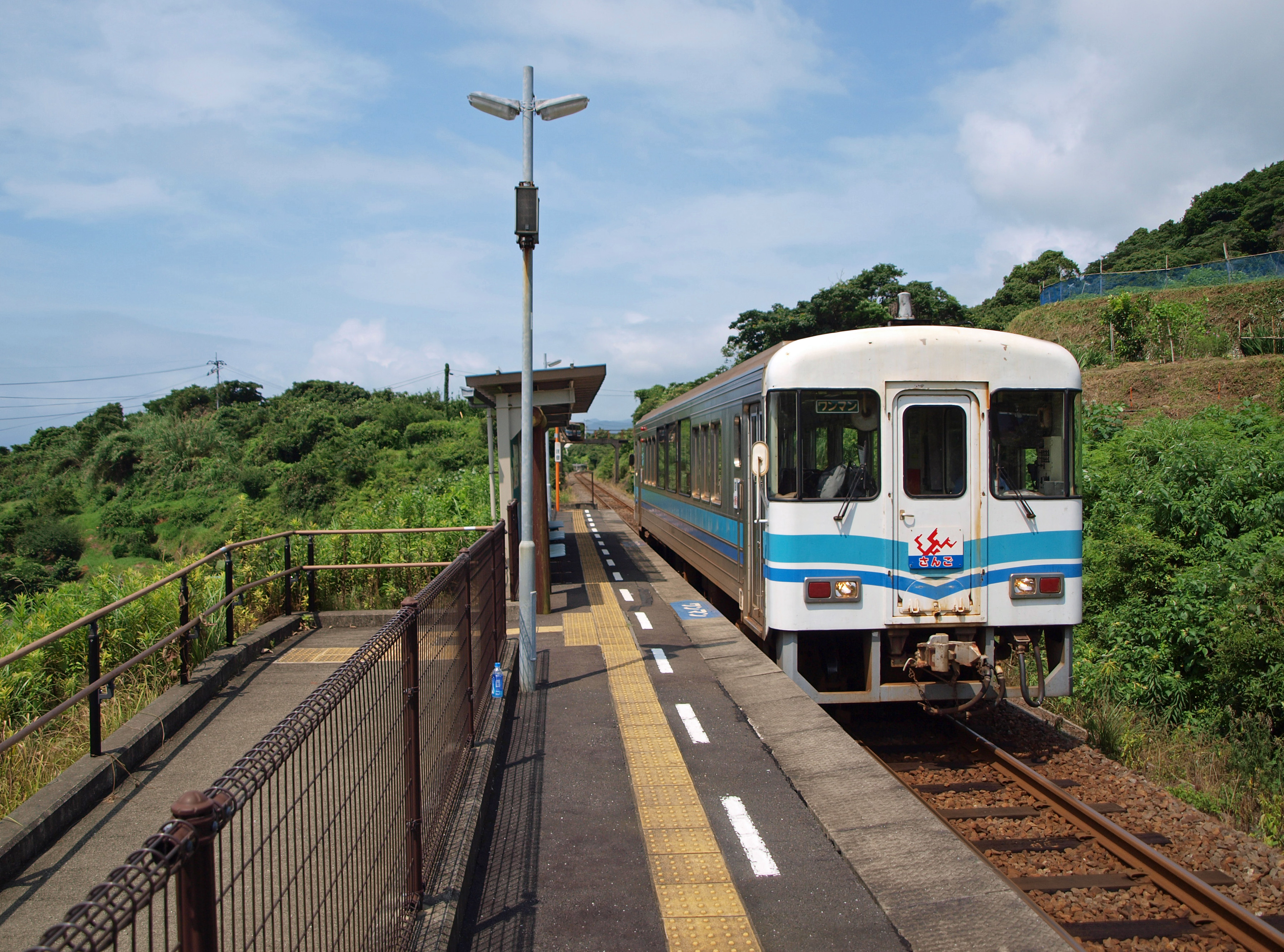
- Platform and track of Uminoōmukae Station

General information
- Location: Kamikawaguchi, Kuroshio-chō, Hata-gun, Kōchi-ken 789-1901; Japan
- Coordinates: 33°02′25″N 133°02′47″E
- Operator: Tosa Kuroshio Railway
- Line: Tosa Kuroshio Railway Nakamura Line
- Distance: 30.1 km from Kubokawa
- Platforms: 1
- Tracks: 1
- Connections: Bus stop

Construction
- Parking: 2 slots
- Cycle facilities: Bike shed
- Accessible: Yes - wheelchair ramp to platform

Other information
- Status: unstaffed
- Station code: TK35

History
- Opened: 22 April 2003

Passengers
- FY2018: 4 daily
Location
- Location within Kochi Prefecture Location within Japan

Uminoōmukae Station (海の王迎駅, Uminoōmukae-eki) is a passenger railway station located in the city of Kuroshio, Hata District, Kōchi Prefecture, Japan. It is operated by the Tosa Kuroshio Railway and has the station number "TK35".

== Lines and services ==
The station is served by the Tosa Kuroshio Railway Nakamura Line, and is located 30.1 km from the starting point of the line at Kubokawa. Only local trains stop at the station.

== Layout ==
The station is set on a hillside above the level of an adjacent secondary road and consists of a single narrow side platform serving a single track. The station is unstaffed and there is no station building, only a shelter for waiting passengers. There is a small car park and bicycle shed at the base of the hill next to the secondary road. A wheelchair ramp leads up to the platform.

== Adjacent stations ==
«	Service	»
Tosa Kuroshio Railway
Nakamura Line
Tosa-Kamikawaguchi	-	Ukibuchi

== History ==
The station opened on 22 April 2003.

== Passenger statistics ==
In fiscal 2011, the station was used by an average of 2 passengers daily.

== Surrounding area ==
- National Route 56
- Hata Youth Centre (幡多青少年の家)
- Utsu beach

== See also ==
- List of railway stations in Japan
