= Ukibuchi Station =

Railway station in Kuroshio, Kōchi Prefecture, Japan

Ukibuchi Station 浮鞭駅
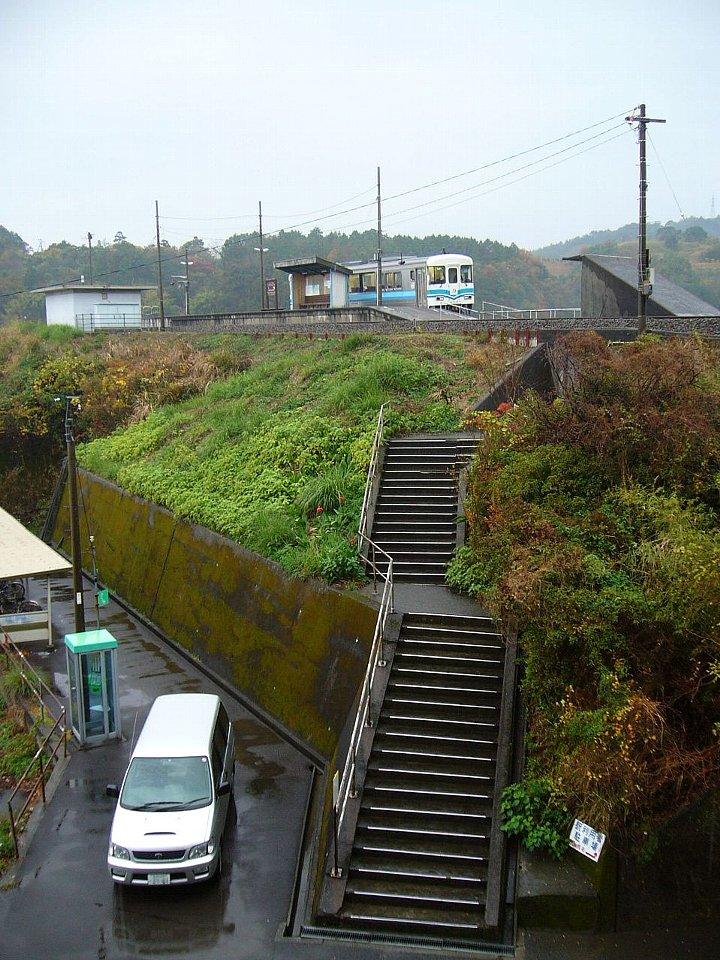
- Ukibuchi Station, December 2006

General information
- Location: Ukibuchi, Kuroshio-chō, Hata-gun, Kōchi-ken 789-1911; Japan
- Coordinates: 33°02′22″N 133°01′48″E
- Operator: Tosa Kuroshio Railway
- Line: Tosa Kuroshio Railway Nakamura Line
- Distance: 31.7 km from Kubokawa
- Platforms: 1
- Tracks: 2

Construction
- Parking: Limited
- Cycle facilities: Bike shed
- Accessible: No - steps from street level, underpass with steps to reach island platform

Other information
- Status: unstaffed
- Station code: TK36

History
- Opened: 1 October 1970

Passengers
- FY2018: 23
Location
- Location within Kochi Prefecture Location within Japan

Ukibuchi Station (浮鞭駅, Ukibuchi-eki) is a passenger railway station located in the city of Kuroshio, Hata District, Kōchi Prefecture, Japan. It is operated by the Tosa Kuroshio Railway and has the station number "TK36".

== Lines ==
The station is served by the Tosa Kuroshio Railway Nakamura Line, and is located 31.7 km from the starting point of the line at Kubokawa. Only local trains stop at the station.

== Layout ==
The station consists of an island platform serving two tracks on an embankment above the roads and farmland on either side. Steps lead up from a secondary road to an underpass which gives access to the island platform which has a shelter for waiting passengers. The station is unstaffed.

== Adjacent stations ==
«	Service	»
Tosa Kuroshio Railway
Nakamura Line
Uminoōmukae	-	Tosa-Irino

== History ==
The station opened on 1 October 1970 under the control of Japanese National Railways (JNR). After the privatization of JNR, control of the station passed to Tosa Kuroshio Railway on 1 April 1988.

== Passenger statistics ==
In fiscal 2011, the station was used by an average of 40 passengers daily.

== Surrounding area ==
- The settlement surrounding the station is shown on maps as Ukibuchi but is part of the town of Kuroshio.
- National Route 56 runs along the coast while the track in the vicinity of the station runs further inland but the road is only about 500 metres away.
- Bios Oogata Road Station - a service station 1 km away on National Route 56.
- Irino Matsubara Campground, a campsite within the Tosa Southwest Large Scale Park.

== See also ==
- List of railway stations in Japan
