= Nishi-Ōgata Station =

Railway station in Kuroshio, Kōchi Prefecture, Japan

Nishi-Ōgata Station 西大方駅
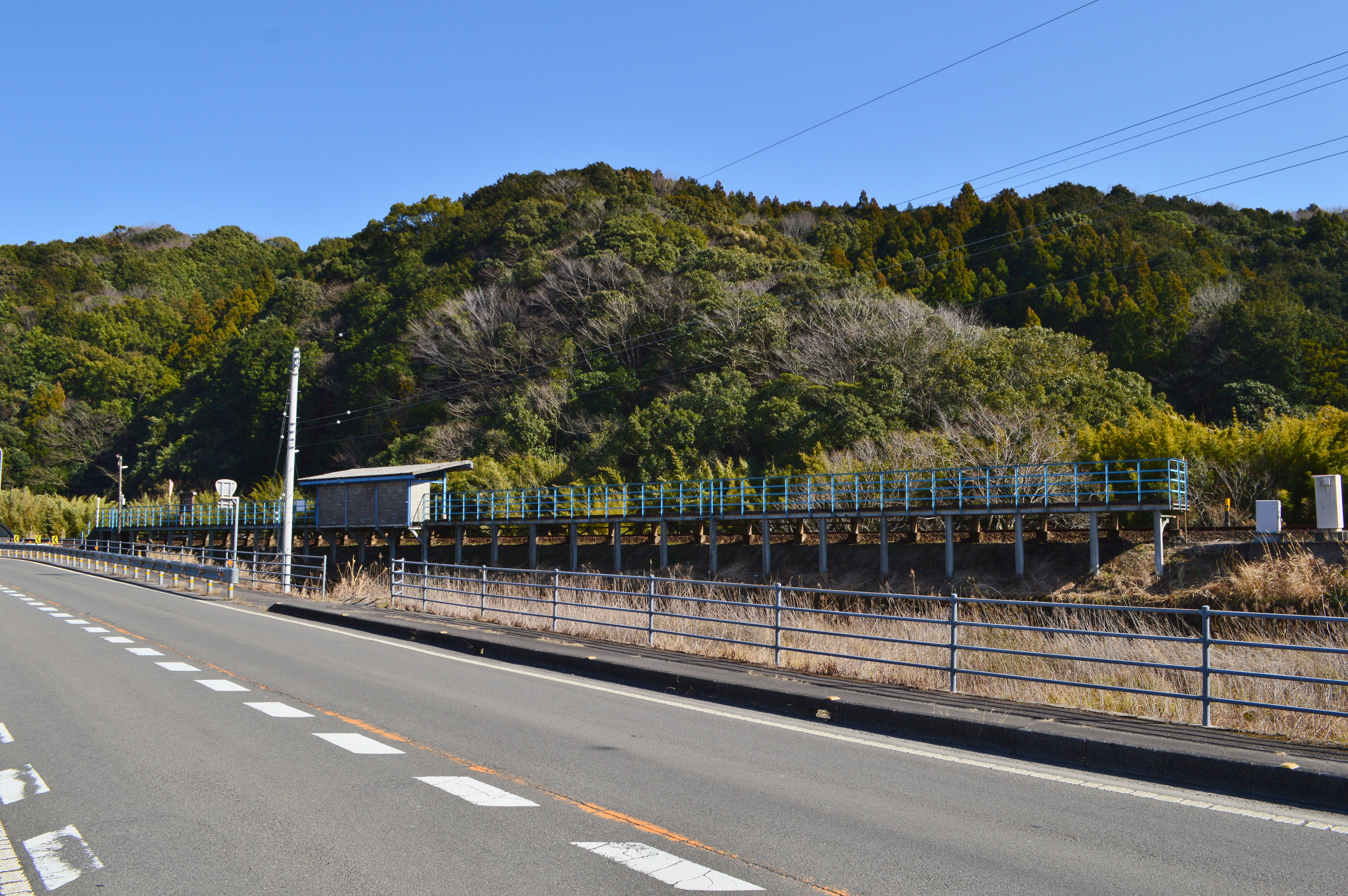
- Nishi-Ōgata Station in February 2018

General information
- Location: Kamitanokuchi, Kuroshio-chō, Hata-gun, Kōchi-ken, 789-1935; Japan
- Coordinates: 33°00′32″N 132°59′12″E
- Operator: Tosa Kuroshio Railway
- Line: Tosa Kuroshio Railway Nakamura Line
- Distance: 37.2 km from Kubokawa
- Platforms: 1
- Tracks: 1

Construction
- Structure type: Low embankment
- Parking: Available
- Cycle facilities: Bike shed
- Accessible: No - steps lead up to platform

Other information
- Status: unstaffed
- Station code: TK38

History
- Opened: 1 October 1970

Passengers
- FY2018: 11
Location
- Location within Kochi Prefecture Location within Japan

Nishi-Ōgata Station (西大方駅, Nishi-Ōgata-eki) is a passenger railway station located in the town of Kuroshio, Hata District, Kōchi Prefecture, Japan. It is operated by the Tosa Kuroshio Railway and has the station number "TK38".

== Lines ==
Nishi-Ōgata Station is served by the Tosa Kuroshio Railway Nakamura Line, and is located 37.2 km from the starting point of the line at Kubokawa. Only local trains stop at this station.

== Layout ==
The station consists of a side platform serving a single track situated on an embankment above farmland on both sides. There is no station building, only a shelter for waiting passengers. Parking and a bike shed are provided on a lay-by along National Route 56 which runs adjacent to the embankment. A flight of steps leads up from the parking area to the platform and the station is thus not wheelchair accessible.

== Adjacent stations ==
«	Service	»
Tosa Kuroshio Railway
Nakamura Line
Tosa-Irino	-	Kotsuka

== History ==
The station opened on 1 October 1970 under the management of Japanese National Railways (JNR). After the privatization of JNR, control of the station passed to Tosa Kuroshio Railway on 1 April 1988.

== Passenger statistics ==
In fiscal 2011, the station was used by an average of nine passengers daily.

== See also ==
- List of railway stations in Japan
