= Ariigawa Station =

Railway station in Kuroshio, Kōchi Prefecture, Japan

Ariigawa Station 有井川駅
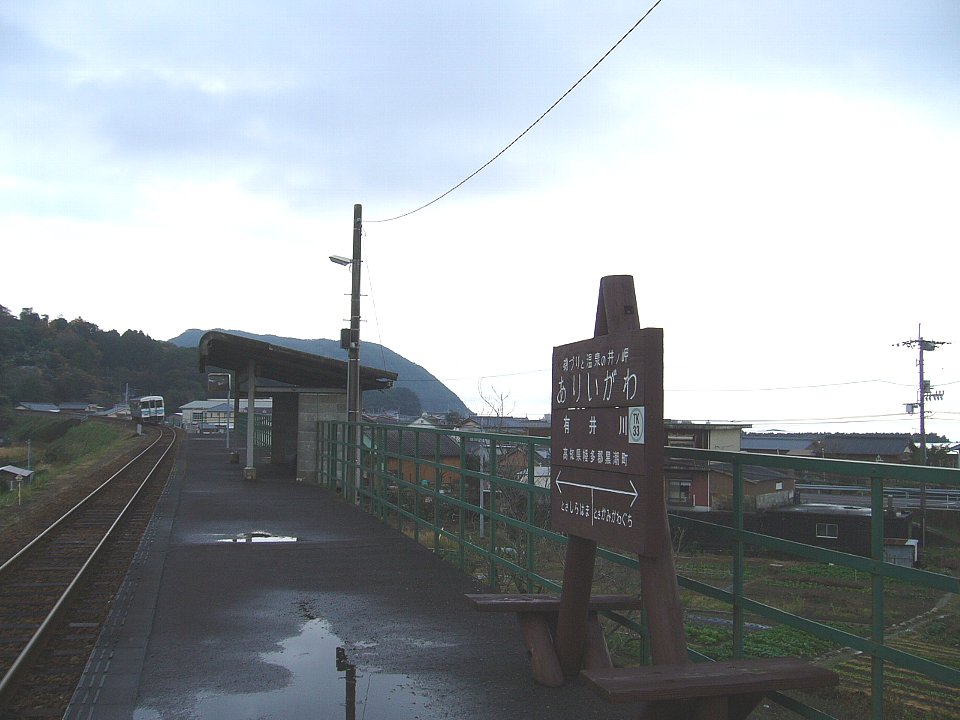
- Ariigawa Station in 2006

General information
- Location: Ariigawa, Kuroshio-chō, Hata-gun, Kōchi-ken, 789-1903; Japan
- Coordinates: 33°02′21″N 133°04′17″E
- Operator: Tosa Kuroshio Railway
- Line: Nakamura Line
- Distance: 27.6 km from Kubokawa
- Platforms: 1 side platform
- Tracks: 1

Construction
- Accessible: No - steps lead up to platform

Other information
- Station code: TK33

History
- Opened: 1 October 1970
- Former names: Higashi-Ōgata (to 1982)

Passengers
- FY2018: 11
Location
- Location within Kochi Prefecture Location within Japan

Ariigawa Station (有井川駅, Ariigawa-eki) is a passenger railway station located in the town of Kuroshio, Hata District, Kōchi Prefecture, Japan. It is operated by the Tosa Kuroshio Railway and has the station number "TK33".

== Lines ==
The station is served by the Tosa Kuroshio Railway Nakamura Line, and is located 27.6 km from the starting point of the line at Kubokawa. Only local trains stop at the station.

== Layout ==
The station, which is unstaffed, consists of a single side platform serving a single line and is located on an embankment above farmland on both sides. There is no access road. A paved footpath from the mainroad ends in a flight of steps leading to the platform. There is a shelter on the platform for waiting passengers. The station is not wheelchair accessible.

== Adjacent stations ==
«	Service	»
Tosa Kuroshio Railway
Nakamura Line
Tosa-Shirahama	-	Tosa-Kamikawaguchi

== History ==
The station opened on 1 October 1970 under the control of Japanese National Railways (JNR) with the name Higashi-Ōgata Station (東大方駅, Higashi-Ōgata-eki). On 15 November 1982, it was renamed Ariigawa Station. After the privatization of JNR, control of the station passed to Tosa Kuroshio Railway on 1 April 1988.

== Passenger statistics ==
In fiscal 2011, the station was used by an average of 15 passengers daily.

== Surrounding area ==
- National Route 56 runs near the station and is reached by a paved footpath.
- The houses around the station are marked on the map as Ariigawa. This is part of the town of Kuroshio.

== See also ==
- List of railway stations in Japan
