= Tosa-Shirahama Station =

Railway station in Kuroshio, Kōchi Prefecture, Japan

Tosa-Shirahama Station 土佐白浜駅
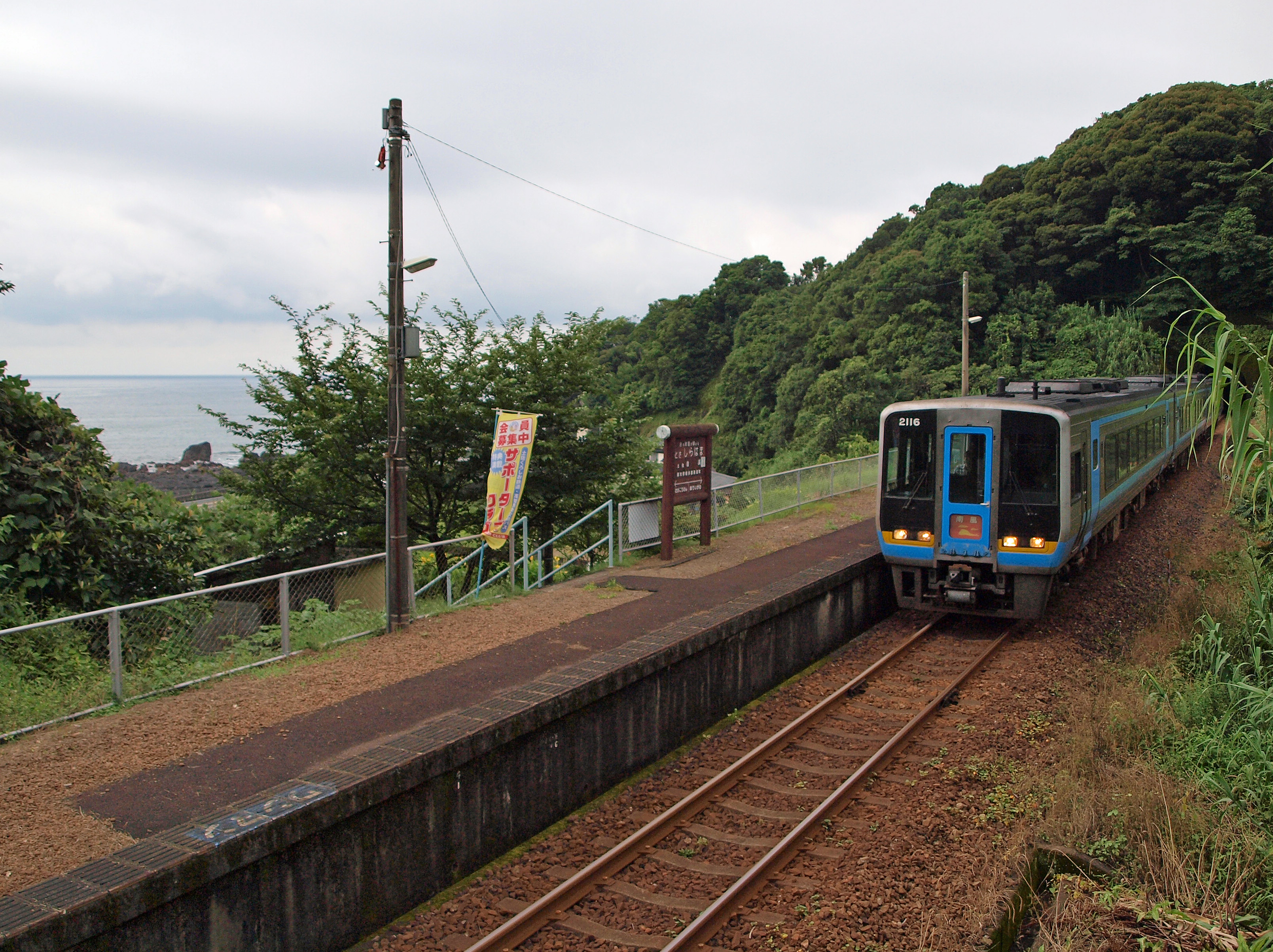
- Platform of Tosa-Shirahama Station looking in the direction of Ariigawa

General information
- Location: Shirahama, Kuroshio-chō, Hata-gun, Kōchi-ken, 789-1725; Japan
- Coordinates: 33°03′23″N 133°05′51″E
- Operator: Tosa Kuroshio Railway
- Line: Nakamura Line
- Distance: 24.1 km from Kubokawa
- Platforms: 1 side platform
- Tracks: 1

Construction
- Accessible: No - steps lead up to platform

Other information
- Station code: TK32

History
- Opened: 1 October 1970

Passengers
- FY2019: 0
Location
- Location within Kochi Prefecture Location within Japan

Tosa-Shirahama Station (土佐白浜駅, Tosa-Shirahama-eki) is a passenger railway station located in the town of Kuroshio, Hata District, Kōchi Prefecture, Japan. It is operated by the Tosa Kuroshio Railway and has the station number "TK32".

== Lines ==
The station is served by the Tosa Kuroshio Railway Nakamura Line, and is located 24.1 km from the starting point of the line at Kubokawa. Only local trains stop at the station.

== Layout ==
There is no station building. The station, which is unstaffed, consists of a single side platform serving a single line and is located on an embankment high above the adjacent main road and buildings. A ramp from the main road leads to a shelter for waiting passengers which is located on a lower level. Steps from the shelter lead up to the platform which is thus not wheelchair accessible. There is no shelter on the platform itself. The station is a designated evacuation area in the event of tsunamis.

== Adjacent stations ==
«	Service	»
Nakamura Line
Saga-Kōen	Local	Ariigawa

== History ==
The station opened on 1 October 1970 under the control of Japanese National Railways (JNR). After the privatization of JNR, control of the station passed to the Tosa Kuroshio Railway on 1 April 1988.

== Passenger statistics ==
In fiscal 2019, the station was used by an average of 0 passengers daily.

== Surrounding area ==
- National Route 56 runs next to the station below the embankment.

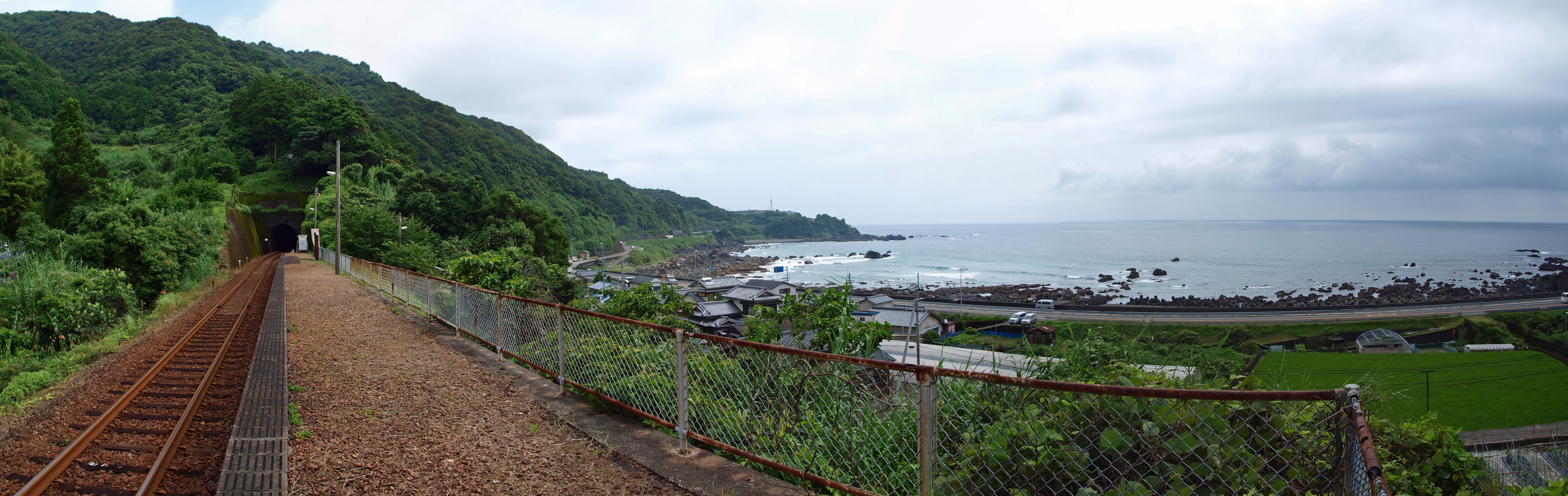
A panorama of the platform and the Pacific Ocean. National Route 56 can be seen along the coast. The buildings are at a location named Shirahama on the map but are part of the town of Kuroshio.

== See also ==
- List of railway stations in Japan
