= Iyoki Station =

Railway station in Kuroshio, Kōchi Prefecture, Japan

Iyoki Station 伊与喜駅
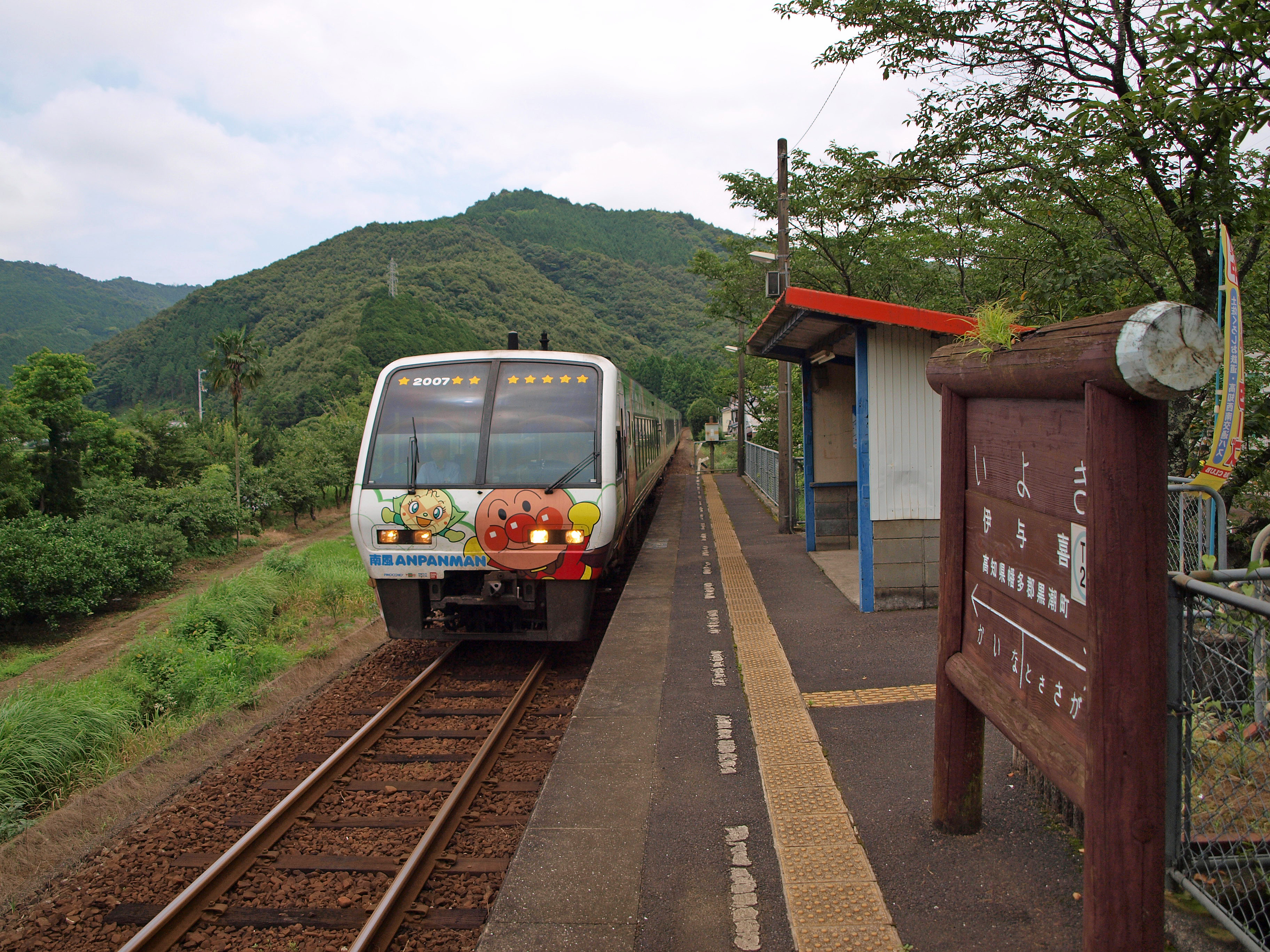
- Iyoki Station platform as of 2010

General information
- Location: Iyoki, Kuroshio-chō, Hata-gun, Kōchi-ken 789-1713; Japan
- Coordinates: 33.1049°N 133.0984°E
- Operator: Tosa Kuroshio Railway
- Line: Tosa Kuroshio Railway Nakamura Line
- Distance: 18.1 km from Kubokawa
- Platforms: 1
- Tracks: 1

Construction
- Structure type: At grade

Other information
- Status: Unstaffed
- Station code: TK29

History
- Opened: 18 December 1963

Passengers
- FY2019: 21
Location
- Location within Kochi Prefecture Location within Japan

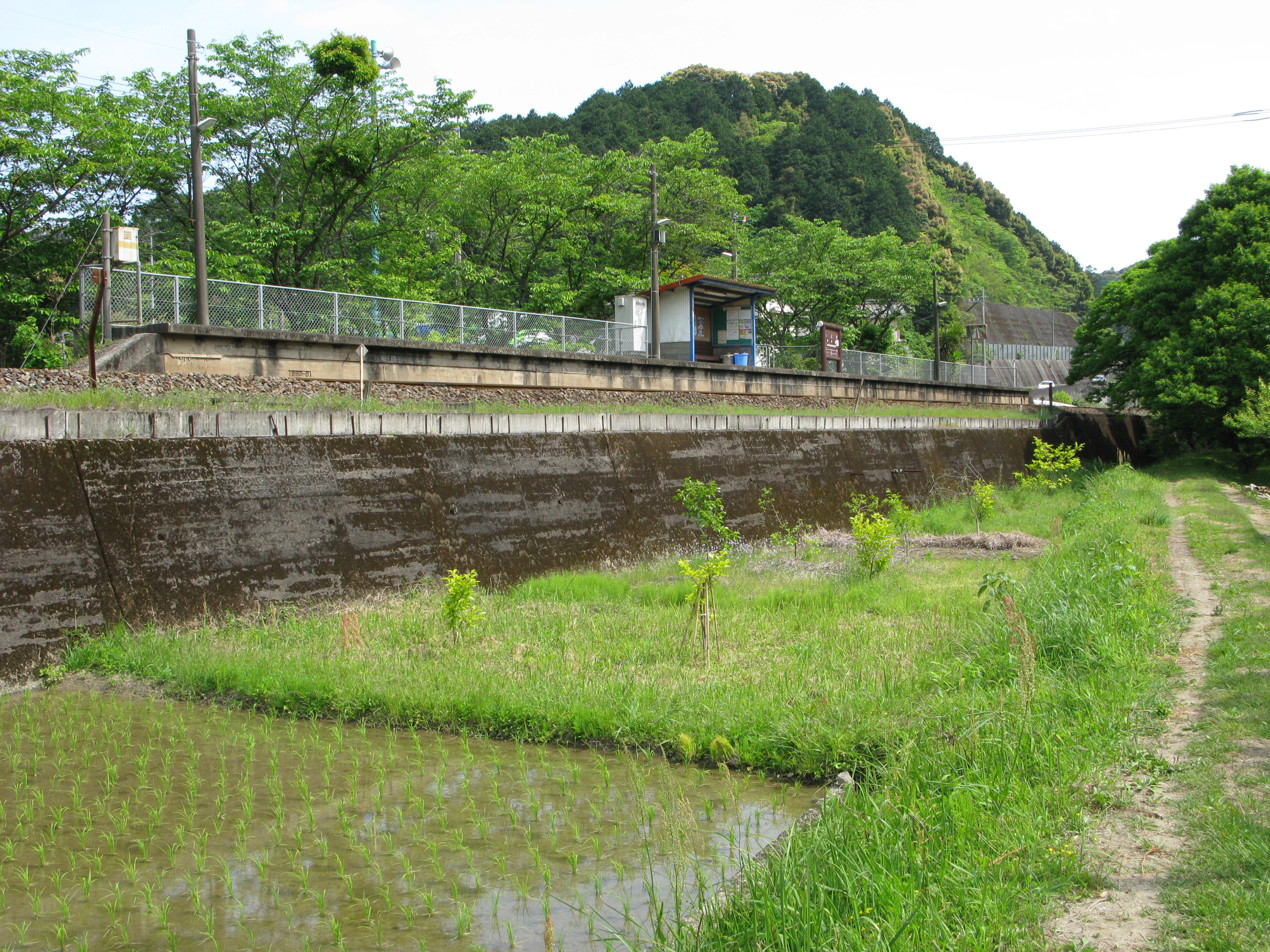
270pxIIyoki Station panorama in 2009

Iyoki Station (伊与喜駅, Iyoki-eki) a passenger railway station located in the town of Kuroshio, Hata District, Kōchi Prefecture, Japan. It is operated by the Tosa Kuroshio Railway and has the station number "TK29".

== Lines and Trains ==
The station is served by the Tosa Kuroshio Railway Nakamura Line, and is located 18.1 km from the starting point of the line at Kubokawa. Only local trains stop at the station.

== Layout ==
The station consists of a side platform serving a single track. There is no station building and the station is unstaffed. A shelter is provided on the platform for waiting passengers.

== Adjacent stations ==
«	Service	»
Nakamura Line
Kaina	Local	Tosa-Saga

== History ==
Japanese National Railways (JNR) opened the station on 18 December 1963 as an intermediate station when it laid down the Nakamura Line from Kubokawa to Tosa-Saga. After the privatization of JNR, control of the station passed to Tosa Kuroshio Railway on 1 April 1988.

== Passenger statistics ==
In fiscal 2019, the station was used by an average of 21 passengers daily.

== Surrounding area ==
- Japan National Route 56
- Kuroshio Town Iyoki Elementary School

== See also ==
- List of railway stations in Japan
