= Tosa-Kamikawaguchi Station =

Railway station in Kuroshio, Kōchi Prefecture, Japan

Tosa-Kamikawaguchi Station 土佐上川口駅
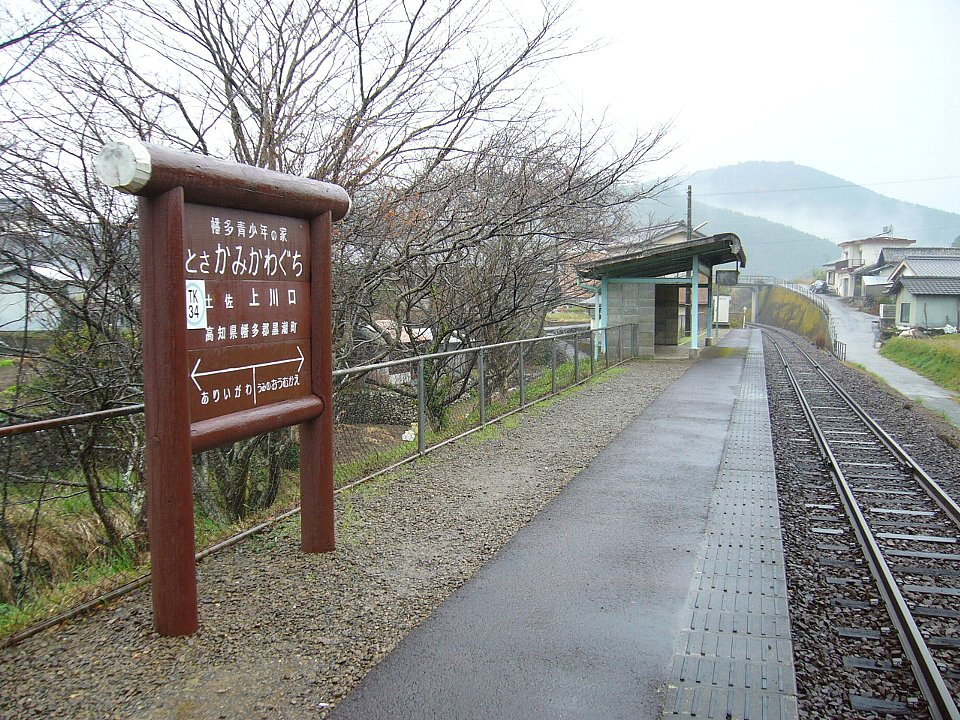
- Tosa-Kamikawaguchi Station, December 2006

General information
- Location: Kamikawaguchi, Kuroshio-chō, Hata-gun, Kōchi-ken 789-1901; Japan
- Coordinates: 33°02′36″N 133°03′22″E
- Operator: Tosa Kuroshio Railway
- Line: Tosa Kuroshio Railway Nakamura Line
- Distance: 29.2 km from Kubokawa
- Platforms: 1
- Tracks: 2

Construction
- Parking: Limited
- Cycle facilities: Bike shed
- Accessible: No - steps from street level, underpass with steps to reach island platform

Other information
- Status: unstaffed
- Station code: TK34

History
- Opened: 1 October 1970

Passengers
- FY2019: 11
Location
- Location within Kochi Prefecture Location within Japan

Tosa-Kamikawaguchi Station (土佐上川口駅, Tosa-Kamikawaguchi-eki) is a passenger railway station located in the town of Kuroshio, Hata District, Kōchi Prefecture, Japan. It is operated by the Tosa Kuroshio Railway and has the station number "TK34".

== Lines and services ==
Tosa-Kamikawaguchi is served by the Tosa Kuroshio Railway Nakamura Line, and is located 29.2 km from the starting point of the line at Kubokawa.

The station is also served by the JR Shikoku Ashizuri limited express service from Nakamura and Sukumo to Kōchi and Shimanto limited express service from Nakamura and Sukumo to Kōchi and Takamatsu.

== Layout ==
The station, which is unstaffed, consists of a side platform serving a single track located on a hillside and is reached by a flight of steps from the access road. There is a shelter on the platform for waiting passengers. A parking area, bike shed, and a public telephone call box is at the base of the stairs.

== Adjacent stations ==
«	Service	»
Tosa Kuroshio Railway
Nakamura Line
Ariigawa	-	Uminoōmukae

== History ==
The station opened on 1 October 1970 under the control of Japanese National Railways (JNR). After the privatization of JNR, control of the station passed to Tosa Kuroshio Railway on 1 April 1988.

== Passenger statistics ==
In fiscal 2011, the station was used by an average of 25 passengers daily.

== Surrounding area ==
- The settlement surrounding the station is shown on maps as Kamikawaguchi and is part of the town of Kuroshio.
- National Route 56 runs parallel to the track along the coast about 250 metres away.
- Kamikawaguchi Harbour - a departure point for whale watching excursions.
- Kamikawaguchi Harbour Whale Park - this recreational area is located next to the harbour.
- Hata Youth Centre (幡多青少年の家) - the recreational facility is mentioned on the station nameboard but the next station Uminoōmukae is actually nearer.

== See also ==
- List of railway stations in Japan
