= Kotsuka Station =

Railway station in Shimanto, Kōchi Prefecture, Japan

Kotsuka Station 古津賀駅
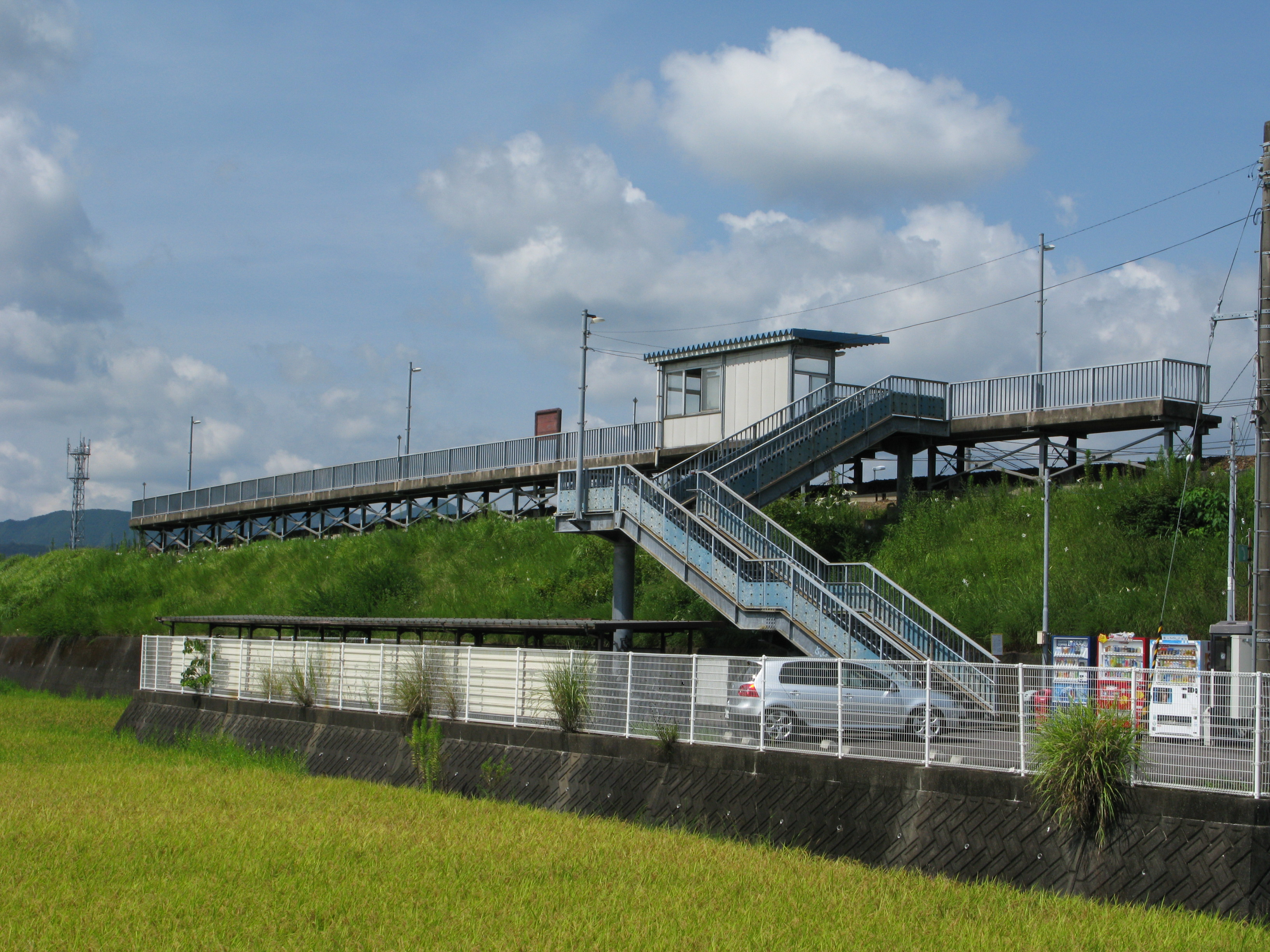
- A view of Kotsuka station. The parking area and bike shed are in the foreground.

General information
- Location: Kotsuka, Shimanto-shi, Kōchi-ken 787-0010; Japan
- Coordinates: 32°59′10″N 132°57′44″E
- Operator: Tosa Kuroshio Railway
- Line: Tosa Kuroshio Railway Nakamura Line
- Distance: 40.9 km from Kubokawa
- Platforms: 1 side platform
- Tracks: 1

Construction
- Parking: Available
- Cycle facilities: Bike shed
- Accessible: No - steps lead up to platform

Other information
- Status: Unstaffed
- Station code: TK39

History
- Opened: 1 April 1988
Location
- Location within Japan

Kotsuka Station (古津賀駅, Kotsuka-eki) is a train station in Shimanto, Kōchi Prefecture, Japan, operated by the Tosa Kuroshio Railway. It is numbered "TK39".

== Lines and services ==
Kotsuka Station is served by the Tosa Kuroshio Railway Nakamura Line, and is located 40.9 km from the starting point of the line at Kubokawa.

The station is also served by JR Shikoku Ashizuri limited express services from Nakamura and Sukumo to Kōchi, with one train a day (in the direction of Kochi only) stopping at Kotsuka.

== Layout ==
The station and track is located on an embankment. The station, which is unstaffed, consists of a side platform serving a single track. There is no station building, only a shelter for waiting passengers. A parking area with vending machines and a bike shed is located at the base of the embankment off National Route 56. A flight of steps leads from this parking area to the platform and the station is thus not wheelchair accessible.

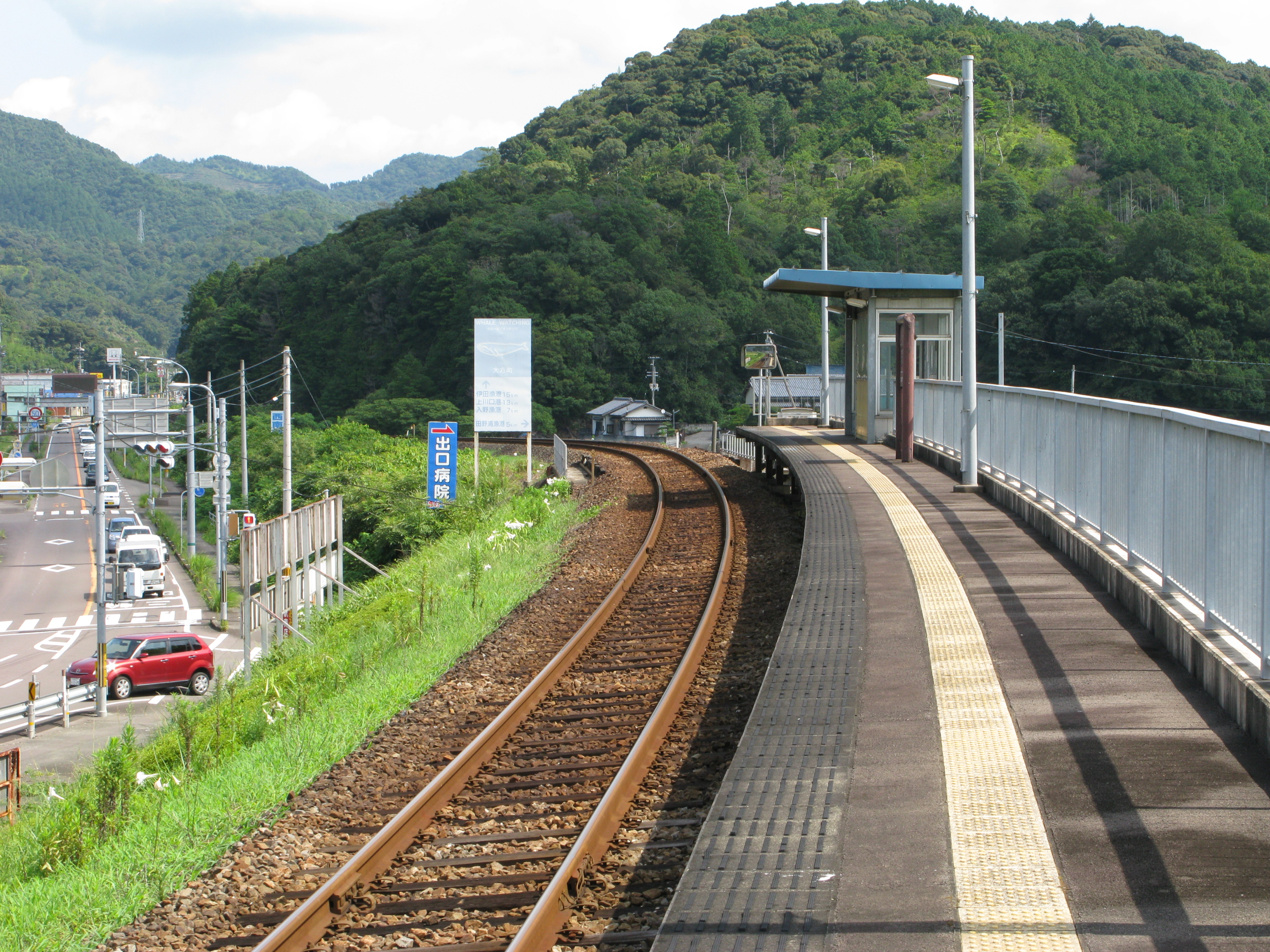
A view of the platform in the direction of Nishi-Ōgata Station

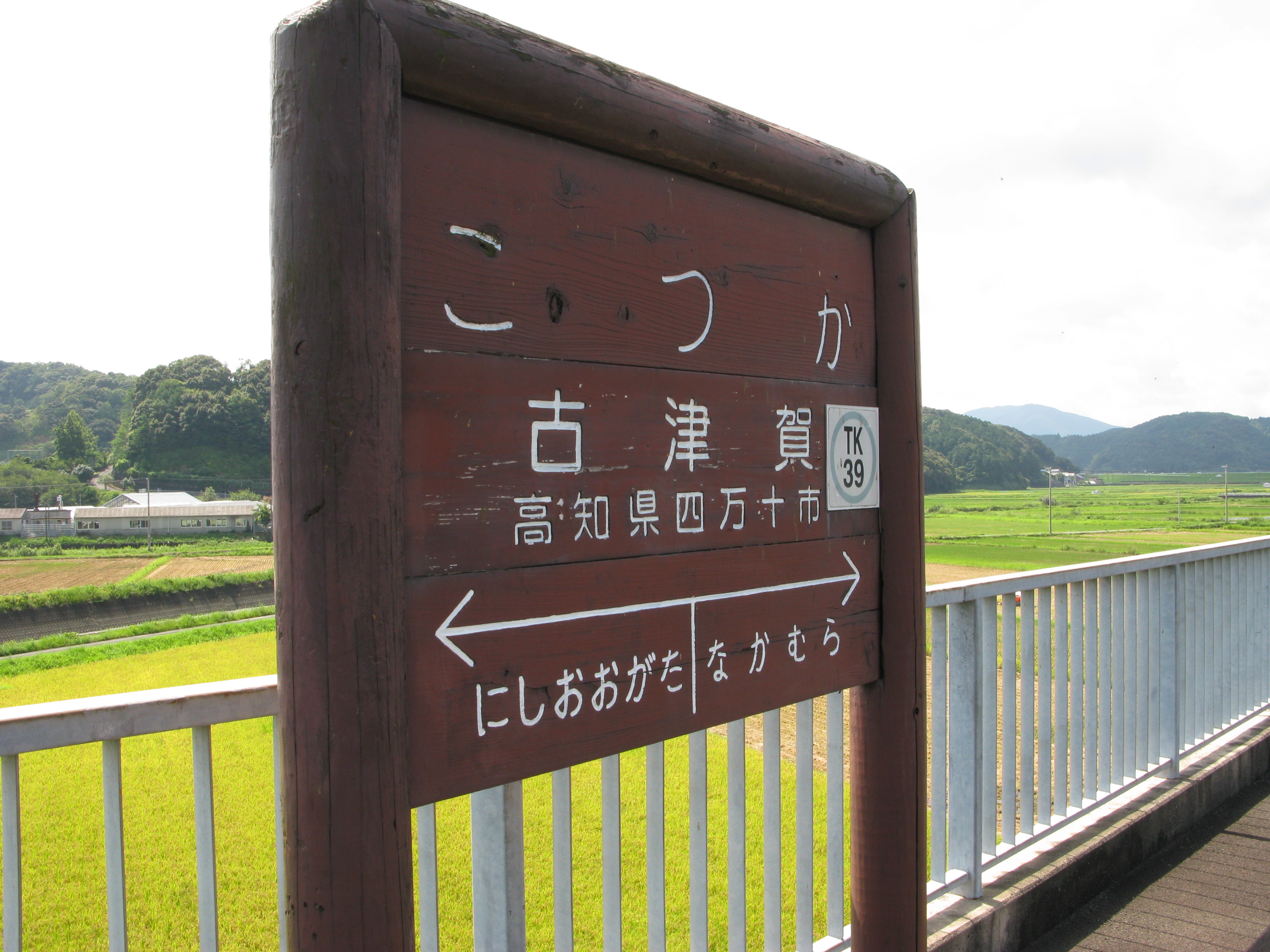
Station nameboard

== Adjacent stations ==
«	Service	»
Nakamura Line
Nishi-Ōgata	-	Nakamura

== History ==
The station opened on 1 April 1988.

== Passenger statistics ==
In fiscal 2011, the station was used by an average of 128 passengers daily.

== Surrounding area ==
- National Route 56 runs parallel to the track.
- The urban area surrounding this station is named Kotsuka on maps, and is part of the town of Shimanto.

== See also ==
- List of railway stations in Japan
