= Tosa-Saga Station =

Railway station in Kuroshio, Kōchi Prefecture, Japan

Tosa-Saga Station 土佐佐賀駅
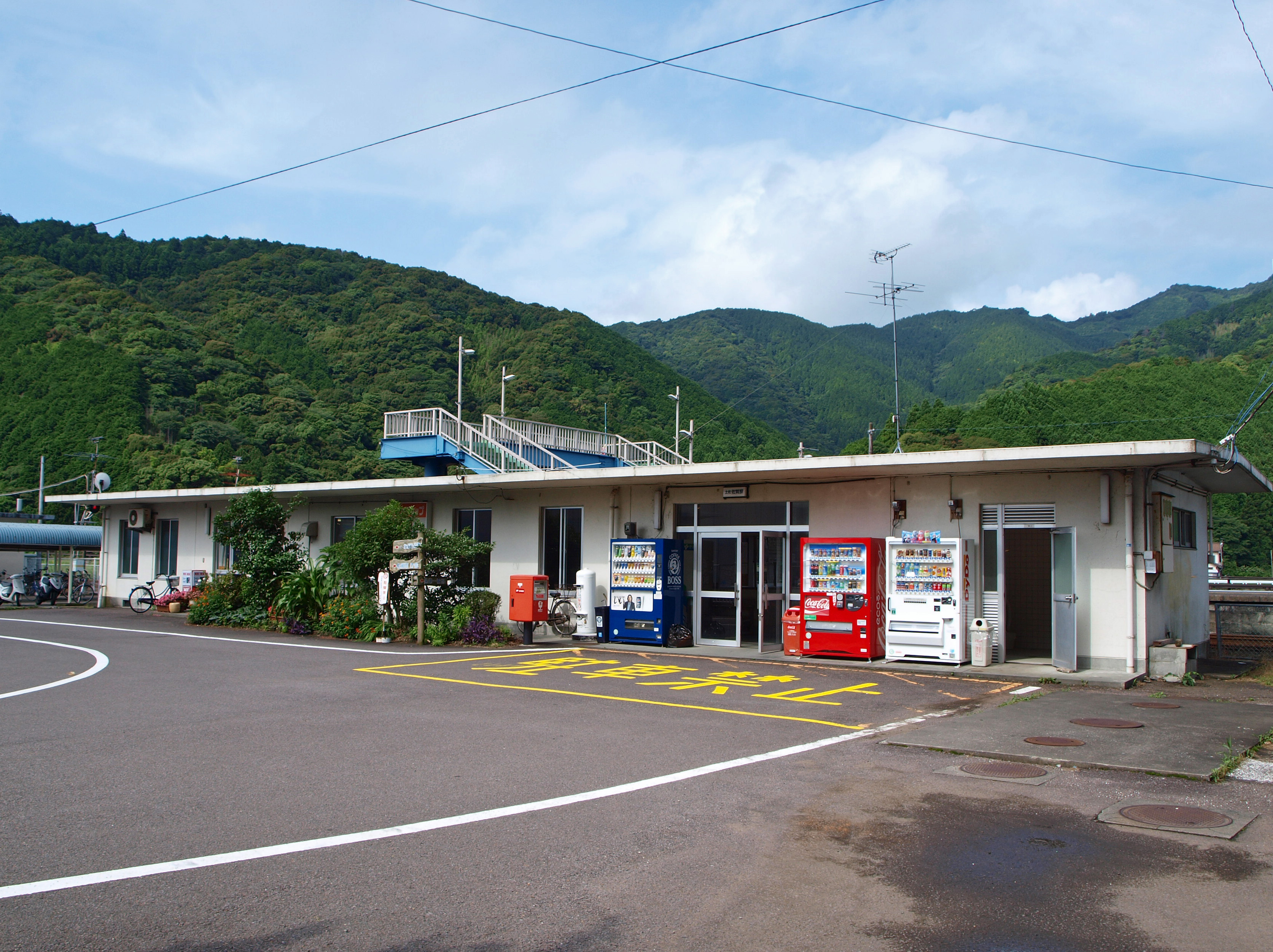
- Tosa-Saga Station facade in 2010

General information
- Location: Saga, Kuroshio-chō, Hata-gun, Kōchi-ken 789-1720; Japan
- Coordinates: 33°04′50″N 133°06′05″E
- Operator: Tosa Kuroshio Railway
- Line: Tosa Kuroshio Railway Nakamura Line
- Distance: 20.8 km from Kubokawa
- Platforms: 2
- Tracks: 2
- Connections: Bus stop

Construction
- Parking: Limited
- Cycle facilities: Bike shed
- Accessible: Yes - level crossing and ramp to island platform

Other information
- Status: Unstaffed
- Station code: TK30

History
- Opened: 18 December 1963

Passengers
- FY2019: 122
Location
- Location within Kochi Prefecture Location within Japan

Tosa-Saga Station (土佐佐賀駅, Tosa-Saga-eki) is a passenger railway station located in the town of Kuroshio, Hata District, Kōchi Prefecture, Japan. It is operated by the Tosa Kuroshio Railway and has the station number "TK30".

== Lines and trains ==
The station is served by the Tosa Kuroshio Railway Nakamura Line, and is located 20.8 km from the starting point of the line at Kubokawa.

The following JR Shikoku limited express services also stop at the station:

- Nanpū - Okayama to Kōchi, Nakamura and Sukumo
- Ashizuri - Kōchi to Nakamura and Sukumo
- Shimanto - Takamatsu to Kōchi, Nakamura and Sukumo

== Layout ==
The station consists of an island platform serving two tracks with a siding. The single-storey station building has a waiting area and a cafe but the ticket window is unstaffed. Bike sheds and a limited number of parking lots are available. A level crossing leads over a track and up a ramp to the island platform.

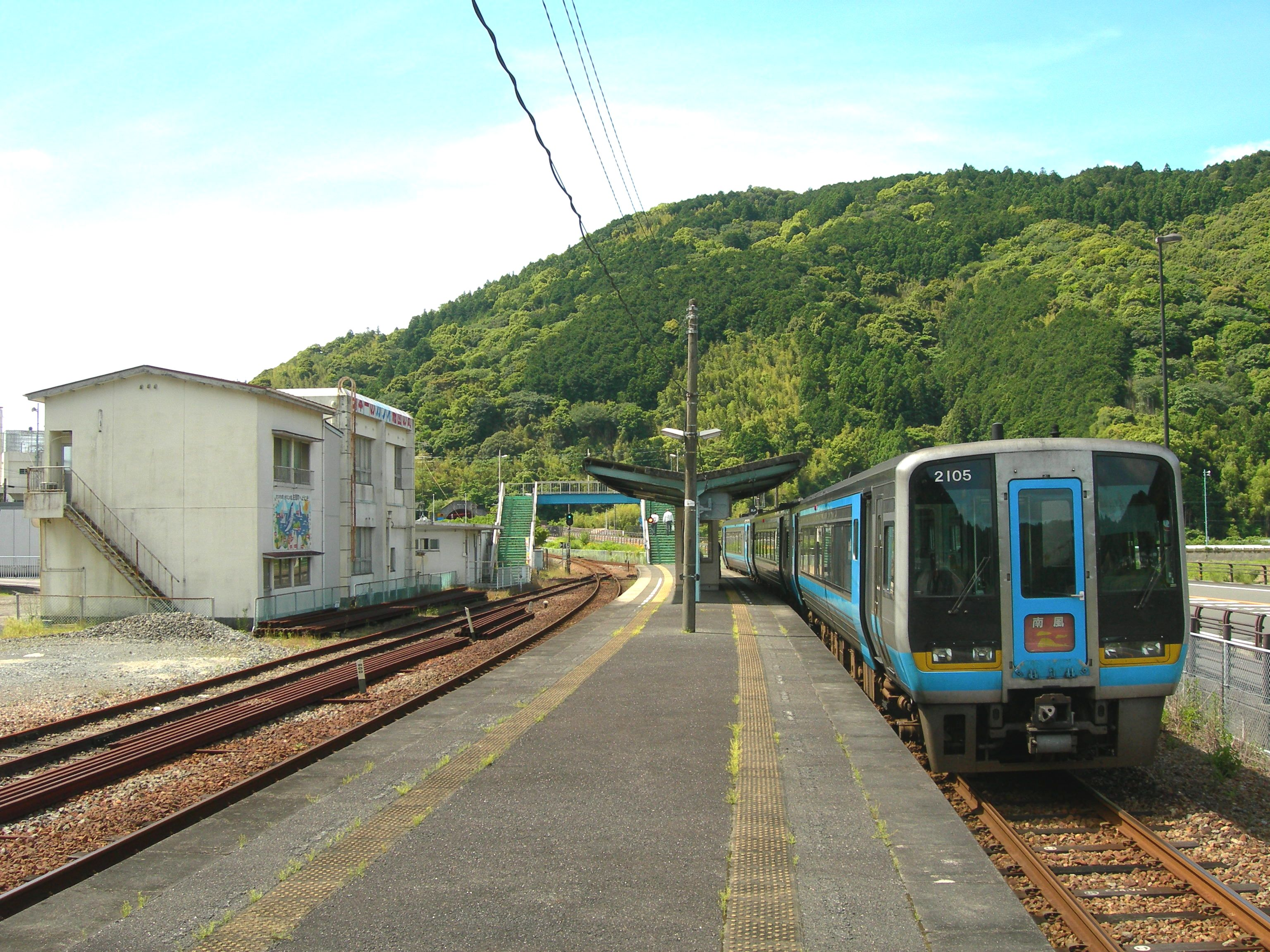
A view of the island platform in 2010. The train is the Nanpū limited express. The footbridge has since been replaced by a level crossing.

== Adjacent stations ==
«	Service	»
Nakamura Line
Iyoki	-	Saga-Kōen

== History ==
The station opened on 18 December 1963 as the terminus of a Japanese National Railways (JNR) line from Kubokawa. It became a through-station on 1 October 1970 when the line was extended to Nakamura. After the privatization of JNR, control of the station passed to Tosa Kuroshio Railway on 1 April 1988.

== Passenger statistics ==
In fiscal 2019, the station was used by an average of 122 passengers daily.

== Surrounding area ==
The station is located in the centre of what used to be the municipality of Saga which has now been merged into the town of Kuroshio.

- National Route 56 runs next to the station.
- Shioya Beach
- Saga fishing port
- Kuroshio Town Saga General Branch

== See also ==
- List of railway stations in Japan
