= Nakamura Line =

Railway line in Kochi Prefecture, Japan

Tosa Kuroshio Railway Nakamura Line
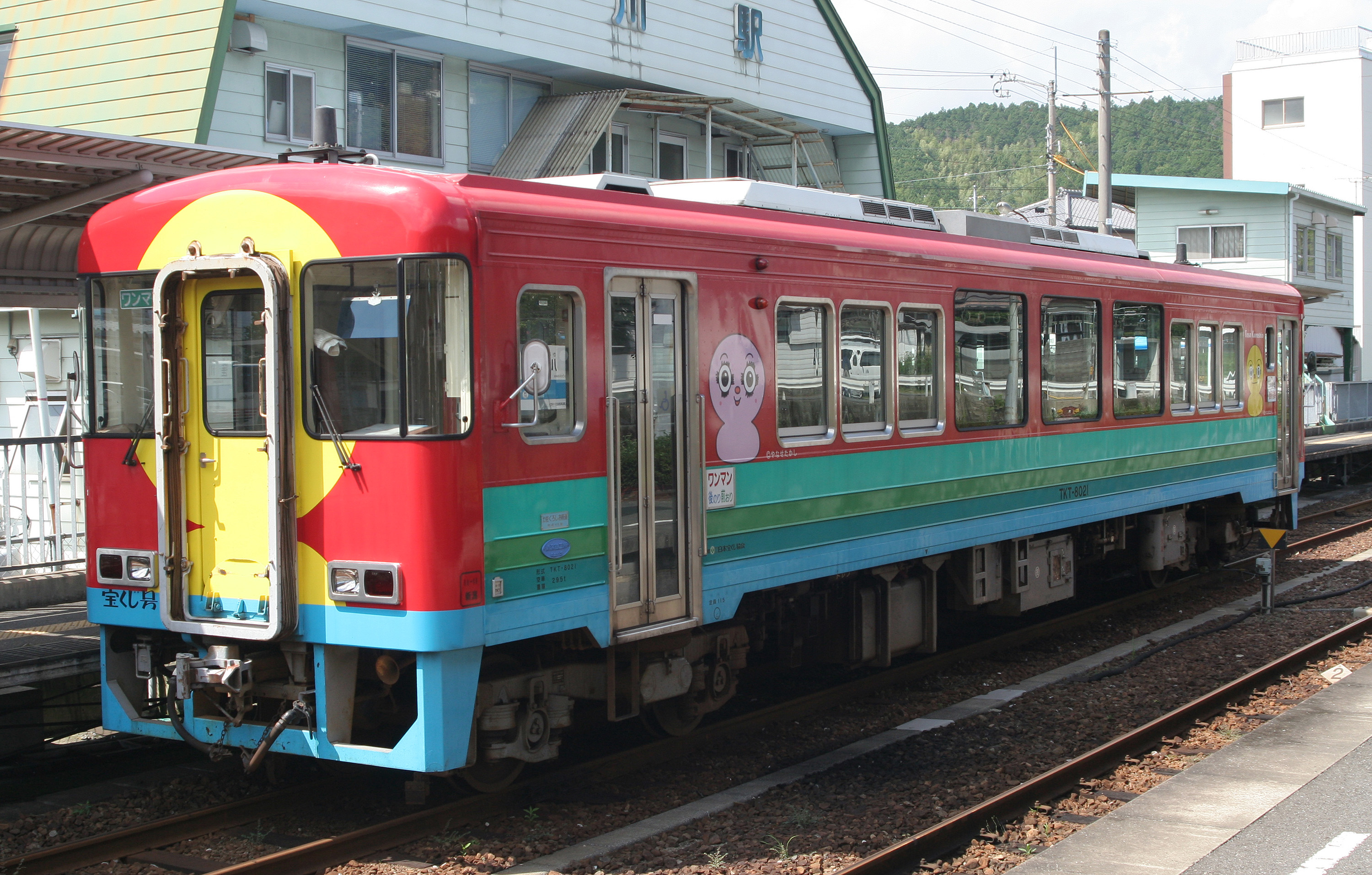
- A Tosa Kuroshio Railway DMU at Kubokawa Station, September 2007

Overview
- Native name: 土佐くろしお鉄道中村線
- Status: Operational
- Owner: Tosa Kuroshio Railway
- Locale: Kōchi Prefecture
- Termini: Kubokawa; Nakamura
- Stations: 15

Service
- Type: Regional rail
- Operator: Tosa Kuroshio Railway
- Rolling stock: TKT-8000 series DMU, JR Shikoku 2000 series DMU, JR Shikoku 2700 series DMU

History
- Opened: 18 December 1963; 62 years ago

Technical
- Line length: 43.0 km (26.7 mi)
- Number of tracks: Entire line single tracked
- Character: Rural
- Track gauge: 1,067 mm (3 ft 6 in)
- Minimum radius: 250 m
- Electrification: None
- Operating speed: 110 km/h (68 mph)

The Tosa Kuroshio Railway Nakamura Line (土佐くろしお鉄道中村線, Tosa Kuroshio Tetsudō Nakamura-sen) is a 43.0 km Japanese railway line operated by the third-sector railway operator Tosa Kuroshio Railway. It connects Kubokawa Station in the town of Shimanto with Nakamura Station in the city of Shimanto in Kōchi Prefecture.

== Stations ==
No.	Name	Japanese	Distance (km)	Transfers	Location	
TK26	Kubokawa	窪川	0.0	Dosan Line (K26)	Shimanto, Takaoka	Kōchi
TK27	Wakai	若井	4.4	Yodo Line(G27)	Shimanto, Takaoka	Kōchi
TK28	Kaina	荷稲	13.8		Kuroshio, Hata	Kōchi
TK29	Iyoki	伊与喜	18.1		Kuroshio, Hata	Kōchi
TK30	Tosa-Saga	土佐佐賀	20.8		Kuroshio, Hata	Kōchi
TK31	Saga-Kōen	佐賀公園	22.9		Kuroshio, Hata	Kōchi
TK32	Tosa-Shirahama	土佐白浜	24.1		Kuroshio, Hata	Kōchi
TK33	Ariigawa	有井川	27.6		Kuroshio, Hata	Kōchi
TK34	Tosa-Kamikawaguchi	土佐上川口	29.2		Kuroshio, Hata	Kōchi
TK35	Uminoōmukae	海の王迎	30.1		Kuroshio, Hata	Kōchi
TK36	Ukibuchi	浮鞭	31.7		Kuroshio, Hata	Kōchi
TK37	Tosa-Irino	土佐入野	34.3		Kuroshio, Hata	Kōchi
TK38	Nishi-Ōgata	西大方	37.2		Kuroshio, Hata	Kōchi
TK39	Kotsuka	古津賀	40.9		Shimanto	Kōchi
TK40	Nakamura	中村	43.0	Tosa Kuroshio Railway Sukumo Line (TK40)	Shimanto	Kōchi

== History ==
The first section of the line, from Kubokawa to Tosa-Saga was opened by Japanese National Railways (JNR) on 18 December 1963, and operated using diesel trains, functioning as an extension of the Dosan Line. The section from Tosa-Saga to Nakamura opened on 1 October 1970.

Freight operations ceased in 1984, and from 1 April 1988, operation of the line was transferred to the Tosa Kuroshio Railway. With the opening of the Tosa Kuroshio Railway Sukumo Line in October 1997, the maximum line speed was raised from 85 km/h to 110 km/h.

== See also ==
- List of railway lines in Japan
