= Akatsuki Kambayashi =

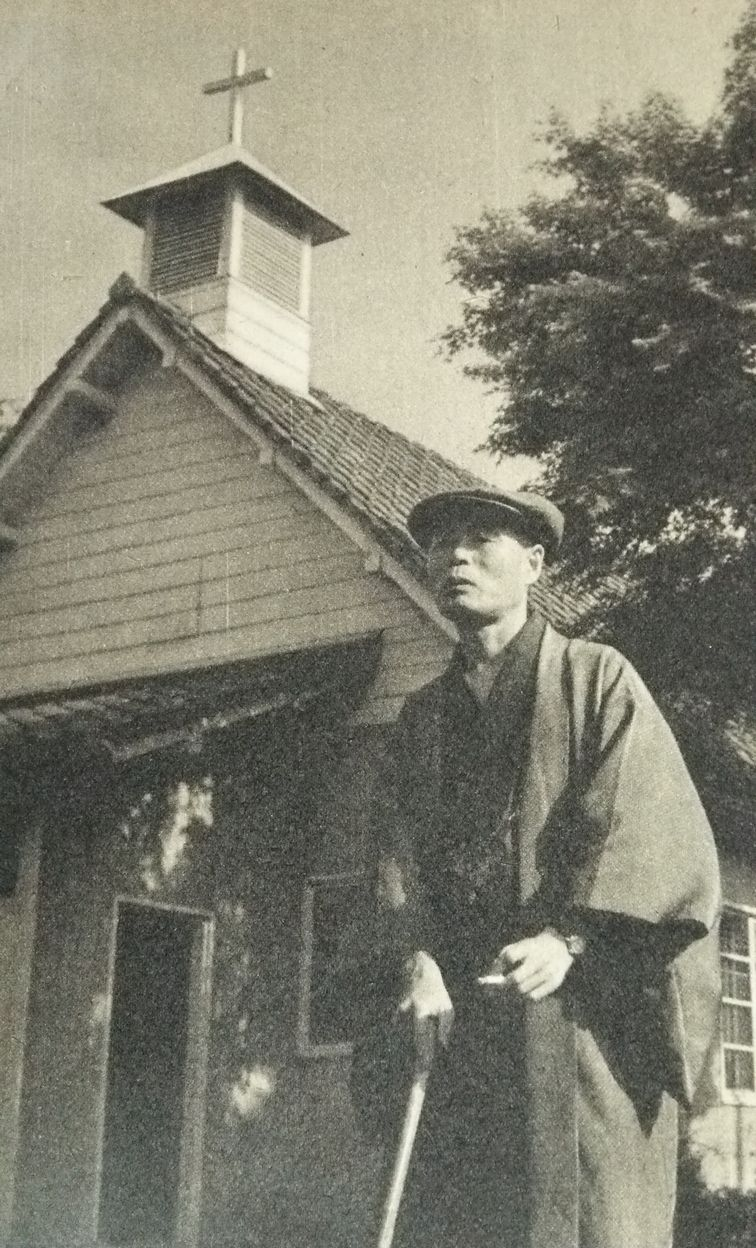
- Born: Tokohiro Iwaki; October 6, 1902; Kuroshio, Kōchi Prefecture, Japan
- Died: August 28, 1980 (aged 77); Japan
- Occupation: Writer
- Notable work: Sei Yohane byōin nite (In the Hospital of St. John, 1946)

Akatsuki Kambayashi (上林 暁, Kambayashi Akatsuki; October 6, 1902 – August 28, 1980), pseudonym of Tokohiro Iwaki, was a noted Japanese author in the I Novel genre.

Kambayashi was born and raised in a village now part of Kuroshio in Kōchi Prefecture. In 1927 he received a graduate degree in English literate from the University of Tokyo and took a job with the Kaizo publishing company. That same year he began to write and continued until 1973, despite two debilitating strokes.

Kambayashi published more than two hundred stories, most of which are based on personal experiences. According to Donald Keene, these stories fall into three broad clusters: those set in the village of Shikoku where he grew up; those relating to the illness and madness of his wife; and those describing his younger sister. Perhaps the best known is Sei Yohane byōin nite (In the Hospital of St. John, 1946), in which describes the slow death of his wife in the middle of a war-torn country.

Kambayashi received the 1964 Yomiuri Prize for Shiroi yakatabune, and in 1969 became a member of the Japan Art Academy. He died in 1980, at the age of 77.

== Publications ==
- Fuyu no Yado (Lodging in Winter, 1942)
- Sei Yohane byōin nite (In the Hospital of St. John, 1946)
