= JR Shikoku 2700 series =

Diesel multiple unit train operated in Japan

2700 series
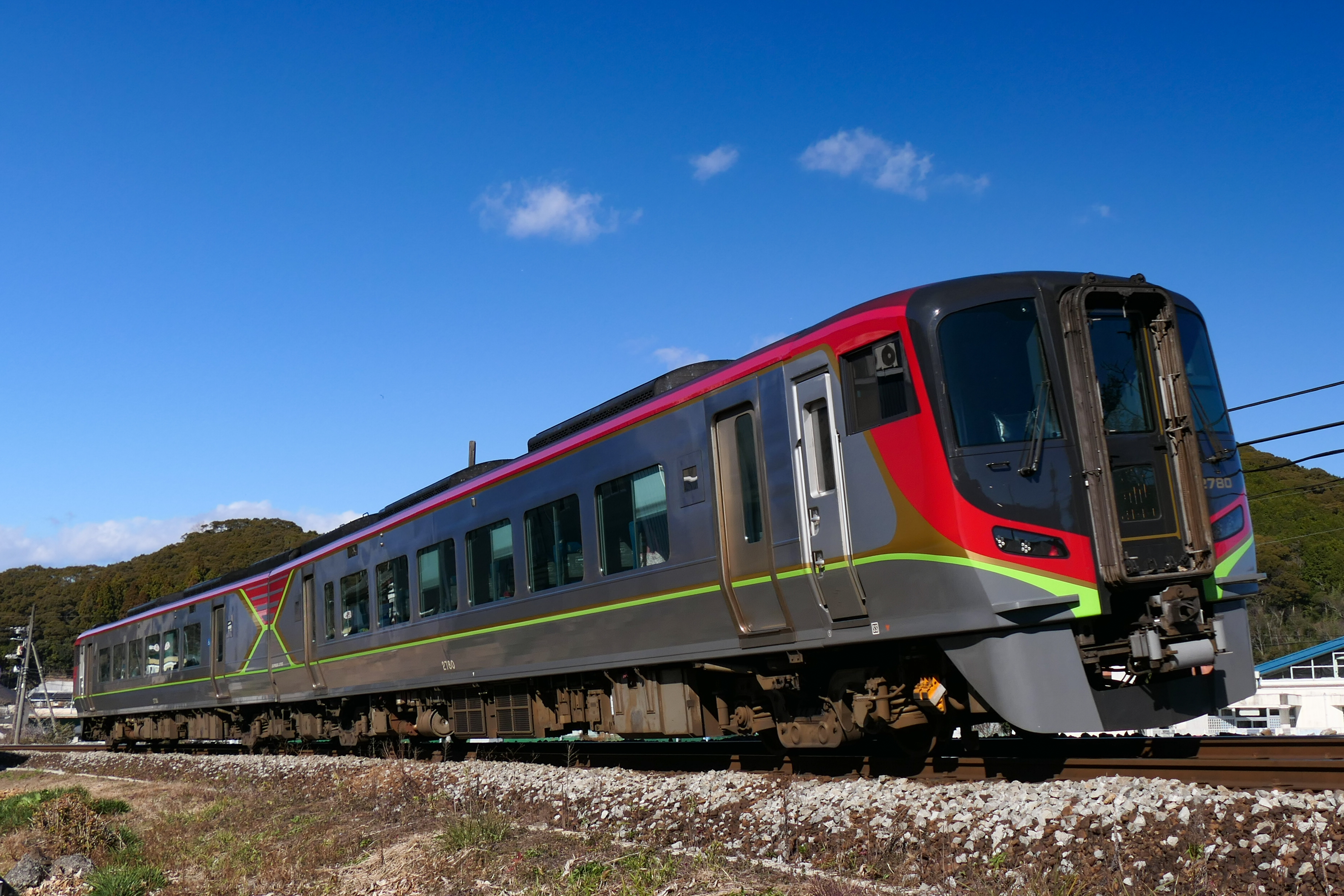
- A 2700 series set in December 2021
- Manufacturer: Kawasaki Heavy Industries
- Replaced: 2000 series
- Constructed: 2018–2020
- Entered service: 6 August 2019
- Number built: 41 cars (17 sets)
- Formation: 2/3 cars
- Capacity: 134 (3-car sets); 98 (2-car sets)
- Operators: JR Shikoku; Tosa Kuroshio Railway
- Depots: Takamatsu, Kōchi

Specifications
- Car body construction: Stainless steel
- Car length: 20,800 mm (68 ft 3 in)
- Width: 2,786 mm (9 ft 1.7 in)
- Height: 3,445 mm (11 ft 3.6 in)
- Floor height: 1,105 mm (3 ft 7.5 in)
- Doors: 2 per side
- Maximum speed: 130 km/h (81 mph)
- Prime mover: SA6D140HE-2 diesel motor
- Power output: 2 x 331 kW (445 hp) per car
- Bogies: S-DT70
- Track gauge: 1,067 mm (3 ft 6 in)

The 2700 series (2700系, 2700-kei) is a tilting diesel multiple unit (DMU) train type operated by Shikoku Railway Company (JR Shikoku) and Tosa Kuroshio Railway on limited express services in Shikoku, Japan.

== Design ==
The design is based on the 2600 series and features a red, gold, and green color scheme, described as "Neo Japonism".

== Formation ==
2700 series sets consist of two or three cars, and are formed as follows. There are 12 first class seats in the series 2800 cars.

Two-car sets

Designation	Mc	Mc'
Numbering	2700	2750
Capacity	46	52
Weight (t)	46.8	46.9

Three-car sets

Designation	Mc	Mc'	Msc
Numbering	2700	2750	2800
Capacity	46	52	36
Weight (t)	46.8	46.9	47.4

== Interior ==
The interior features reclining seats with power sockets, a wheelchair space and an accessible toilet. LED lighting is used in order to reduce power consumption.

== Technical specifications ==
The trains have stainless-steel car bodies, and are powered by two SA6D140HE-2 diesel motors. Instead of the pneumatic-spring suspensions of the 2600 series, the 2700 series use pneumatic pendular suspensions, allowing active tilt up to 5°.

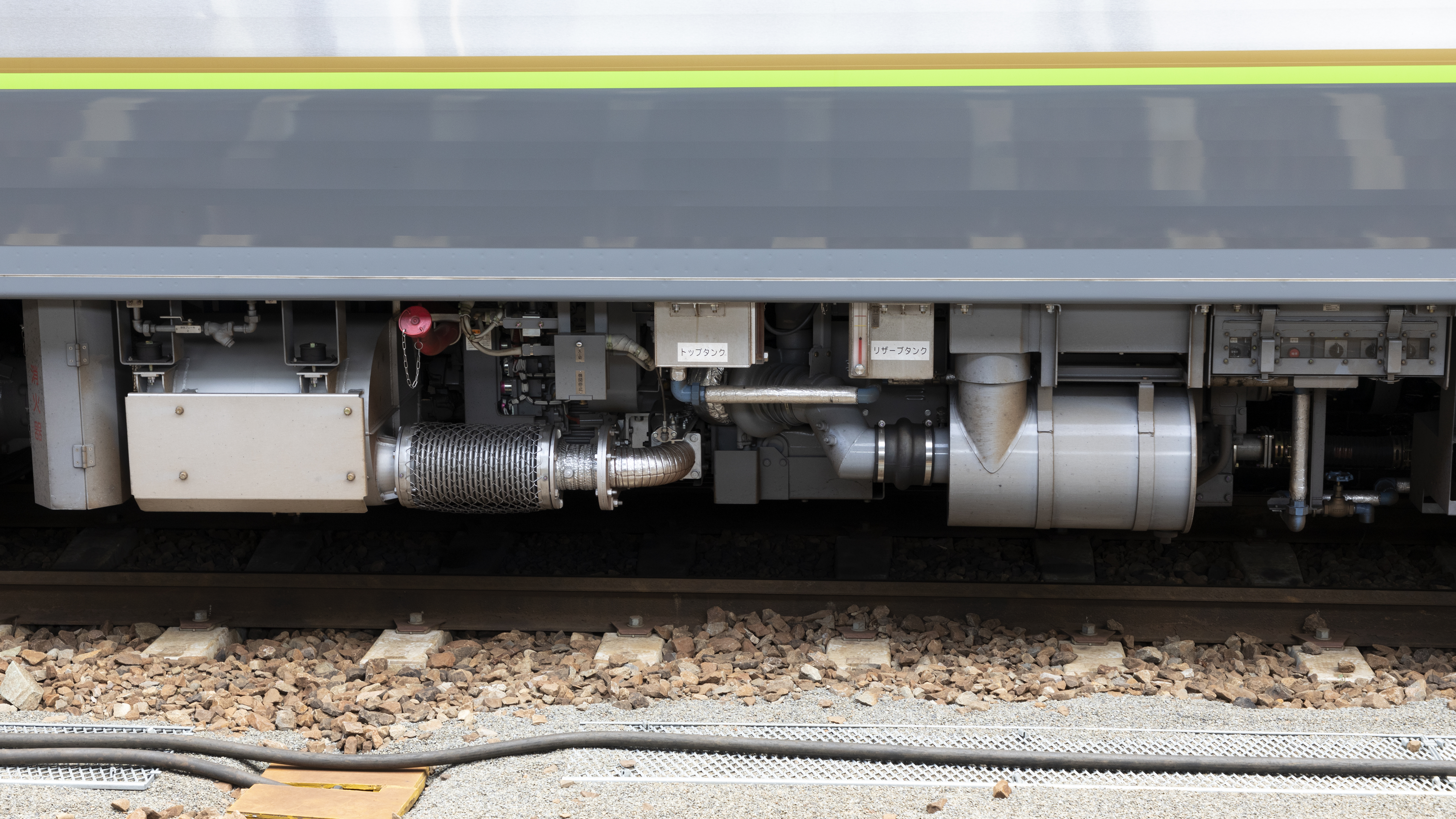
One of the underfloor SA6D140HE-2 diesel engines

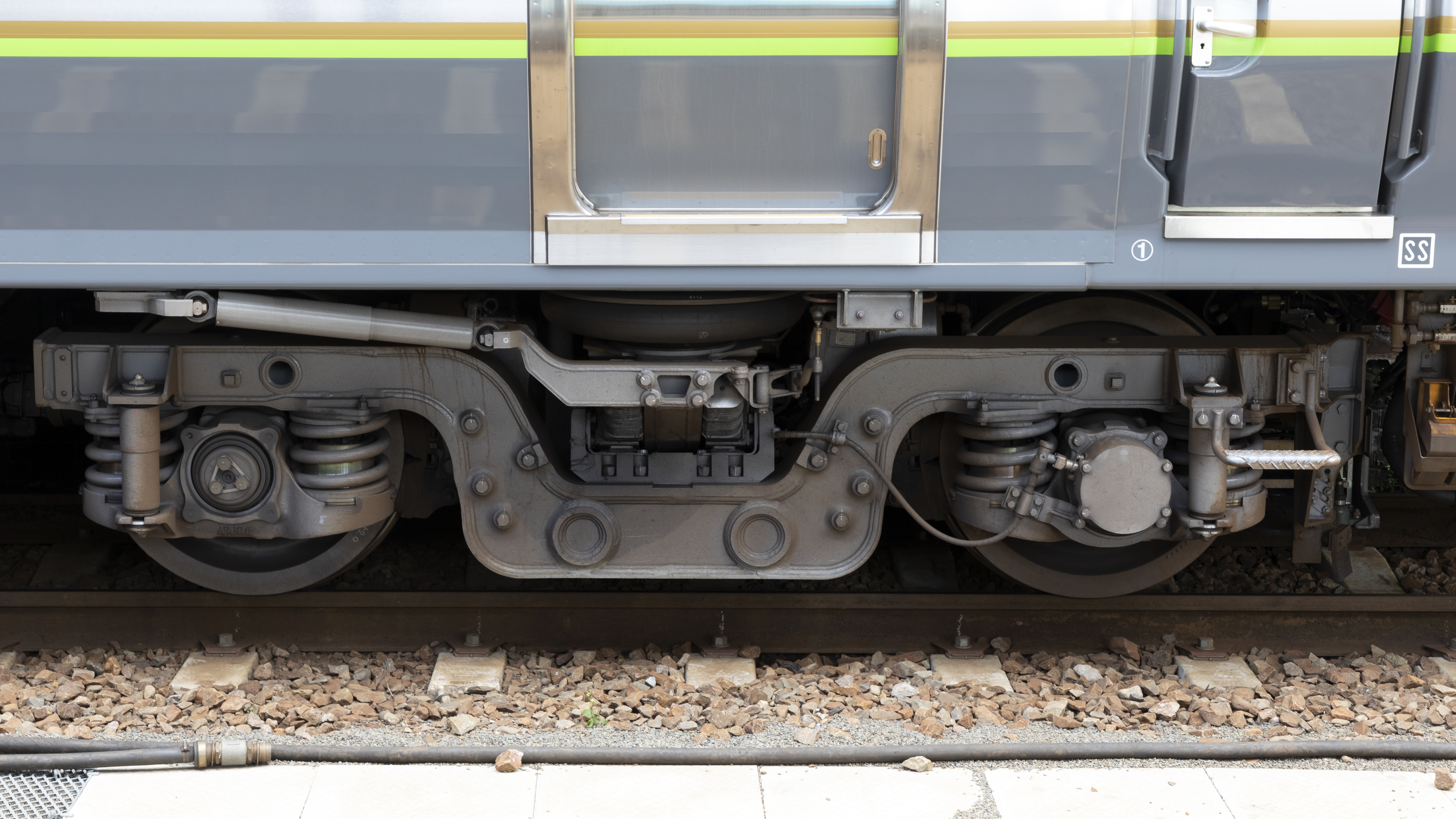
An S-DT70 bogie

== History ==
40 cars were ordered from Kawasaki Heavy Industries as a replacement for ageing 2000 series Trans-Shikoku Express units. The first set was unveiled on January 23, 2019. Entry into revenue service was scheduled for the fall of 2019. The trains entered service on August 6, 2019. The 2700 series was the recipient of the 2020 Laurel Prize.

== Operations ==
As of 2021, 2700 series trains are used on the following services:

- Ashizuri (Kōchi - Sukumo)
- Nanpū (Okayama - Kōchi)
- Shimanto (Takamatsu - Kōchi - Sukumo)
- Uzushio (Okayama - Takamatsu - Tokushima)

== See also ==
- JR Shikoku 2600 series
