= Kuroshio, Kōchi =

Kuroshio 黒潮町
- Town
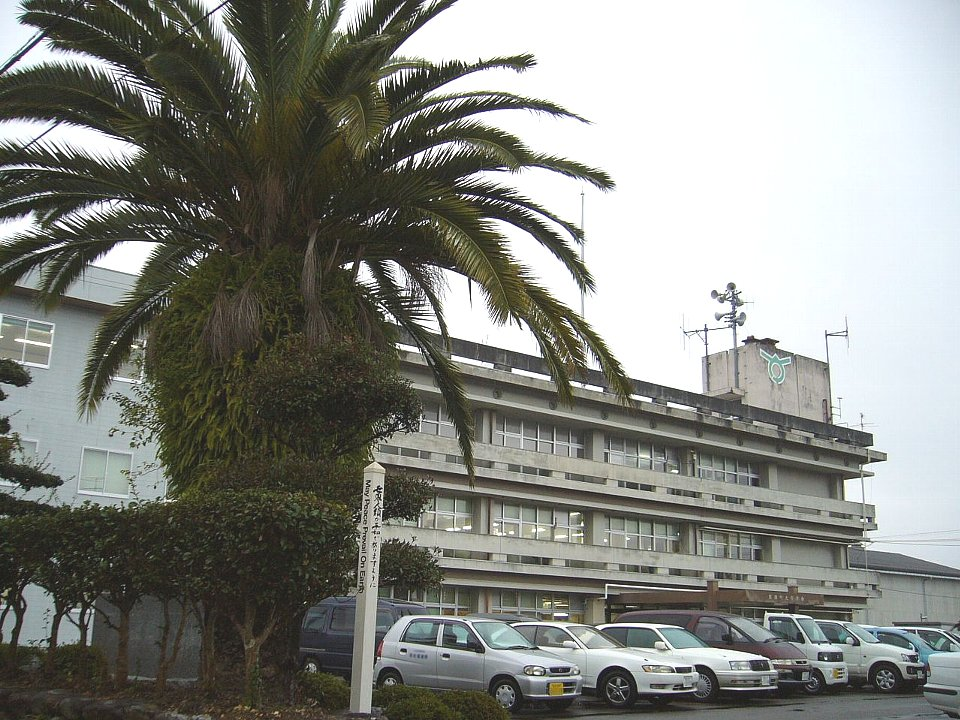
- Kuroshio Town Office

- Flag Emblem
- Interactive map of Kuroshio
- Location in Japan
- Coordinates: 33°1′N 133°1′E
- Country: Japan
- Region: Shikoku
- Prefecture: Kōchi
- District: Hata

Area
  - Total: 188.59 km^{2} (72.82 sq mi)

Population (July 31, 2022)
  - Total: 10,504
  - Density: 55.698/km^{2} (144.26/sq mi)
- Time zone: UTC+09:00 (JST)
- City hall address: 5893 Irino, Kuroshio-chō, Hata-gun, Kōchi-ken 789-1992
- Climate: Cfa
- Website: Official website
- Symbols
- Bird: Kentish plover, Warbling white-eye
- Flower: Lily, Camellia japonica
- Tree: Pinus thunbergii

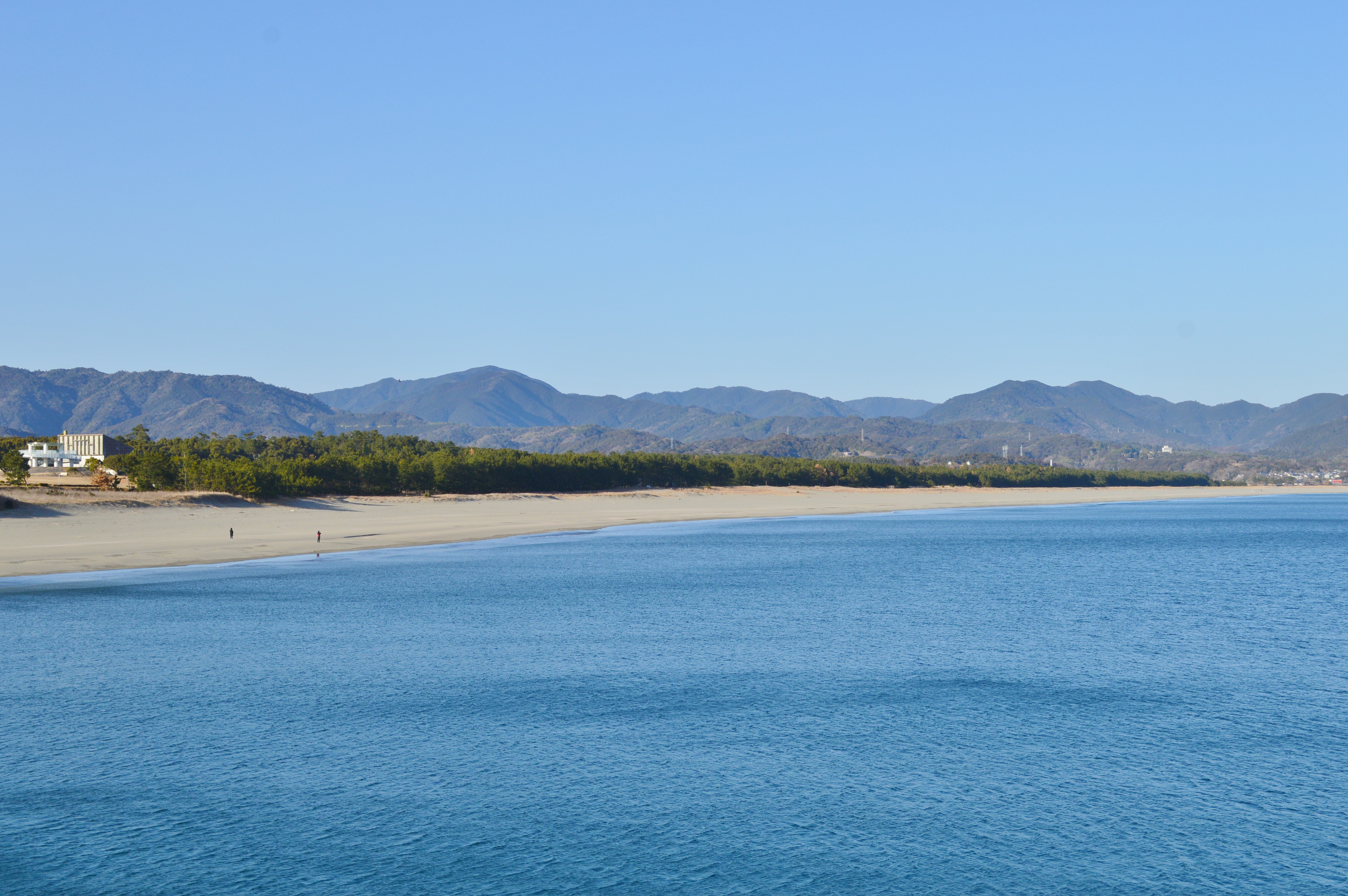
Irino Matsubara

Kuroshio (黒潮町, Kuroshio-chō) is a town located in Hata District, Kōchi Prefecture, Japan. As of 31 July 2022, the town had an estimated population of 10,504 in 5443 households, and a population density of 56 persons per km^{2}. The total area of the town is 188.59 square kilometres (72.82 sq mi). The residents speak a distinct dialect of Japanese known as Hata-ben.

== Geography ==
Kuroshio is located in southwestern Kōchi Prefecture on the island of Shikoku. It has a long coastline facing the Pacific Ocean to the southeast. Kuroshio is located two hours (by car or train) west of Kōchi City.

=== Neighbouring municipalities ===
Kōchi Prefecture

- Shimanto City
- Shimanto Town

=== Climate ===
Kuroshio has a humid subtropical climate (Köppen climate classification Cfa) . The average annual temperature in Kuroshio is 16.6 °C (61.9 °F). The average annual rainfall is 2,812.9 mm (110.74 in) with June as the wettest month. The temperatures are highest on average in August, at around 26.9 °C (80.4 °F), and lowest in January, at around 6.4 °C (43.5 °F). The highest temperature ever recorded in Kuroshio was 40.7 °C (105.3 °F) on 28 July 2026; the coldest temperature ever recorded was −7.3 °C (18.9 °F) on 27 February 1981. Winter (late November through to mid March) can be very dry and chilling with many homes and schools using kerosene heaters to keep warm. Temperatures average 13 °C (55 °F) in the daytime and 2 °C (36 °F) at night. It occasionally snows in the winter though often does not last the day due to the town's close proximity to the coast. The summer months (July - September) are hot and humid. The temperature in summer can reach an average of 32 °C (90 °F) in the day and about 24 °C (75 °F) at night. Rainy season is in June and generally lasts three weeks. Kochi experiences a typhoon season which lasts from July until September. Spring and autumn are mild months with some wet and windy days.

Climate data for Kuroshio (1991−2020 normals, extremes 1977−present)
Month	Jan	Feb	Mar	Apr	May	Jun	Jul	Aug	Sep	Oct	Nov	Dec	Year
Record high °C (°F)	21.6 (70.9)	23.7 (74.7)	27.2 (81.0)	29.3 (84.7)	34.0 (93.2)	35.4 (95.7)	40.7 (105.3)	38.1 (100.6)	35.1 (95.2)	32.1 (89.8)	26.8 (80.2)	23.0 (73.4)	40.7 (105.3)
Mean daily maximum °C (°F)	11.7 (53.1)	12.7 (54.9)	15.9 (60.6)	20.0 (68.0)	23.7 (74.7)	25.9 (78.6)	29.9 (85.8)	30.7 (87.3)	28.2 (82.8)	24.1 (75.4)	19.1 (66.4)	13.9 (57.0)	21.3 (70.4)
Daily mean °C (°F)	6.4 (43.5)	7.4 (45.3)	10.7 (51.3)	15.1 (59.2)	19.1 (66.4)	22.2 (72.0)	26.1 (79.0)	26.9 (80.4)	24.0 (75.2)	19.0 (66.2)	13.6 (56.5)	8.4 (47.1)	16.6 (61.8)
Mean daily minimum °C (°F)	1.8 (35.2)	2.6 (36.7)	5.7 (42.3)	10.3 (50.5)	14.8 (58.6)	19.0 (66.2)	23.0 (73.4)	23.7 (74.7)	20.7 (69.3)	15.0 (59.0)	9.2 (48.6)	3.9 (39.0)	12.5 (54.5)
Record low °C (°F)	−6.1 (21.0)	−7.3 (18.9)	−4.9 (23.2)	−0.1 (31.8)	6.1 (43.0)	11.1 (52.0)	15.5 (59.9)	17.3 (63.1)	9.2 (48.6)	3.9 (39.0)	−0.6 (30.9)	−5.0 (23.0)	−7.3 (18.9)
Average precipitation mm (inches)	79.2 (3.12)	118.7 (4.67)	204.3 (8.04)	234.9 (9.25)	282.3 (11.11)	424.5 (16.71)	282.3 (11.11)	274.8 (10.82)	408.8 (16.09)	256.0 (10.08)	153.5 (6.04)	93.7 (3.69)	2,812.9 (110.74)
Average precipitation days (≥ 1.0 mm)	7.0	8.0	11.0	10.4	10.7	15.1	12.3	12.5	13.4	9.6	7.9	7.0	124.9
Mean monthly sunshine hours	184.1	174.8	192.5	201.0	199.2	134.2	198.1	221.4	161.9	177.7	166.0	180.9	2,191.9
Source: Japan Meteorological Agency

== Demographics ==
Per Japanese census data, the population of Kuroshio in 2020 is 10,262 people. Kuroshio has been conducting censuses since 1960.

Historical population
Year	Pop.	±%
1960	19,623	—
1965	17,522	−10.7%
1970	15,881	−9.4%
1975	15,744	−0.9%
1980	16,116	+2.4%
1985	16,009	−0.7%
1990	15,395	−3.8%
1995	15,024	−2.4%
2000	14,208	−5.4%
2005	13,437	−5.4%
2010	12,366	−8.0%
2015	11,217	−9.3%
2020	10,262	−8.5%
Kuroshio population statistics

== History ==
As with all of Kōchi Prefecture, the area of Kuroshio was part of ancient Tosa Province. During the Edo period, the area was part of the holdings of Tosa Domain ruled by the Yamauchi clan from their seat at Kōchi Castle. Following the Meiji restoration, the village of Saga (佐賀村) was established within Hata District, Kōchi with the creation of the modern municipalities system on October 1, 1889. Saga was raised to town status on November 3, 1940. On March 20, 2006, Saga merged with the neighboring town of Ōgata to form the town of Kuroshio.

== Government ==
Kuroshio has a mayor-council form of government with a directly elected mayor and a unicameral town council of 14 members. Kuroshio contributes one member to the Kōchi Prefectural Assembly. In terms of national politics, the town is part of Kōchi 2nd district of the lower house of the Diet of Japan.

== Economy ==
The local economy is dominated by commercial fishing, notably pole-and-line fishing for Tosa skipjack tuna, and by agriculture, including shiitake mushrooms and greenhouse horticulture, flowers, and paddy rice. In recent years, sun-dried salt has become a representative specialty product. Seasonal tourism, particularly in the summer for camping and surfing is playing an increasing role in the local economy.

== Education ==
Kuroshio has eight public elementary schools and two public middle schools operated by the town government, and one public high school operated by the Kōchi Prefectural Board of Education. The town participates in the JET Programme, employing two representatives who regularly visit the junior high schools and elementary schools to teach English.

Every year in late August, during the summer vacation, twelve third year students chosen from Kuroshio's two junior high schools travel to Hamilton, New Zealand. There they participate in a homestay with families of students who attend Hamilton's Fairfield Intermediate School. The Kuroshio students are accompanied by a Kuroshio Board of Education representative, two teachers and one of the JET participants (usually a New Zealander). The students participate in school activities and ESL classes while at Fairfield Intermediate. Occasionally Fairfield Intermediate have sent a group of students and teachers to visit Kuroshio. The relationship between the two schools began in 1999.

== Transportation ==
=== Railway ===
Tosa Kuroshio Railway - Nakamura Line

- Kaina - Iyoki - Tosa-Saga - Saga-Kōen - Tosa-Shirahama - Ariigawa - Tosa-Kamikawaguchi - Uminoōmukae - Ukibuchi - Tosa-Irino - Nishi-Ōgata

=== Highways ===
- Kōchi Expressway
- National Route 56

== Local attractions ==
- Irino Matsubara, National Place of Scenic Beauty. Baby turtles can be seen entering the water at sunrise from August through September on Irino Beach. Local volunteers help to protect the nests and the young turtles from birds and the trampling feet of beach goers. The volunteers are happy to include early morning spectators in the task of preparing and protecting the newly hatched turtles for their first experience of the open sea. During Golden Week (Japan) Kuroshio's Seaside Gallery hosts the annual T-shirt Art Exhibition on Irino beach. Many entries are made from both within Japan and internationally and draw a great number of tourists to the area.
- Kobushinosata onsen is located on Japan National Route 56, ten minutes east of Saga. Many pilgrims on the Shikoku Pilgrimage stop at this onsen.

== Noted people from Kuroshio ==
- Akatsuki Kambayashi, author
