= Saga, Kōchi =

Dissolved municipality in Hata district, Kōchi prefecture, Japan

Saga (佐賀町, Saga-chō) was a town located in Hata District, Kōchi Prefecture, Japan.

== Population ==
As of 2003, the town had an estimated population of 4,033 and a density of 53.18 persons per km^{2}. The total area was 75.84 km^{2}.

== History ==
On March 20, 2006, Saga, along with the town of Ōgata (also from Hata District), was merged to create the town of Kuroshio and no longer exists as an independent municipality.
