= Ōgata, Kōchi =

Dissolved municipality in Kōchi prefecture, Japan

Ōgata (大方町, Ōgata-chō) was a town located in Hata District, Kōchi Prefecture, Japan.

As of 2003, the town had an estimated population of 9,794 and a density of 87.03 persons per km^{2}. The total area was 112.54 km^{2}.

On March 20, 2006, Ōgata, along with the town of Saga (also from Hata District), was merged to create the town of Kuroshio and no longer exists as an independent municipality.
