= Kubokawa Station =

Railway station in Shimanto, Kōchi Prefecture, Japan

K26 Kubokawa Station 窪川駅
- The JR Shikoku Kubokawa Station building in 2026

General information
- Location: 4 Sakakiyamachō, Shimanto Town, Takaoka District, Kōchi Prefecture 786-0008; Japan
- Coordinates: 33°12′46″N 133°08′14″E
- Operator: JR Shikoku Tosa Kuroshio Railway
- Lines: Dosan Line; Yodo Line; ■ Nakamura Line
- Distance: 198.7 km (123.5 mi) from Tadotsu
- Platforms: 2 side + 1 island platforms
- Tracks: 4 (1 is a siding) + other sidings not served by platforms

Construction
- Parking: Available
- Cycle facilities: Bike shed
- Accessible: Yes - platforms are linked by a footbridge but a level crossing is available

Other information
- Status: Staffed (Midori no Madoguchi)
- Station code: K26; TK26
- Website: Official website

History
- Opened: 12 November 1951; 74 years ago

Passengers
- FY2017: 1,072 (JR); 325 (TKR)

Services
Preceding station	JR Shikoku	Following station
Wakai G27 towards Uwajima	Yodo Line	Terminus
Terminus	Dosan Line	Niida K25 towards Tadotsu
Location
- Location within Kochi Prefecture Location within Japan

Kubokawa Station (窪川駅, Kubokawa-eki) is a junction passenger railway station located in the town of Shimanto, Takaoka District, Kōchi Prefecture, Japan. It is the main station for the town of Shimanto, It hosts the railway services of both the Shikoku Railway Company (JR Shikoku) (as station K26) and the third-sector Tosa Kuroshio Railway (as station TK26).

== Lines ==
Kubokawa is the terminus of the JR Shikoku Dosan Line and is located 198.7 km from the start of the line at Tadotsu.

Trains on the JR Shikoku Yodo Line also start from and end at Kubokawa although the official start of the line is the next station at Wakai. Kubokawa does not bear a station number with the "G" prefix which is used for stations on the Yodo Line.

The station is also the start of the 43.4 kilometer Tosa Kuroshio Railway Nakamura Line with the station number TK26.

In addition to these local lines, Kubokawa is also a stop for the following JR Shikoku limited express services:

- Nanpū - Okayama to Kōchi, Nakamura and Sukumo
- Shimanto - Takamatsu to Kōchi, Nakamura and Sukumo
- Ashizuri - Kōchi to Nakamura and Sukumo

== Layout ==
The station consists of two side platforms and one island platform serving four tracks. Platform 1 serves a siding which is used exclusively by the Nakamura Line and is accessed from the Tosa Kuroshio Railway station building. Platforms 2 and 3 (which share an island) and platform 4 (a side platform) are used by JR Shikoku trains. These are accessed by a footbridge from the JR Shikoku station building or a level crossing. Several sidings branch off tracks 3 and 4. The JR station building houses a waiting room and a JR ticket window (Midori no Madoguchi). Car parking and a bike shed are available outside.

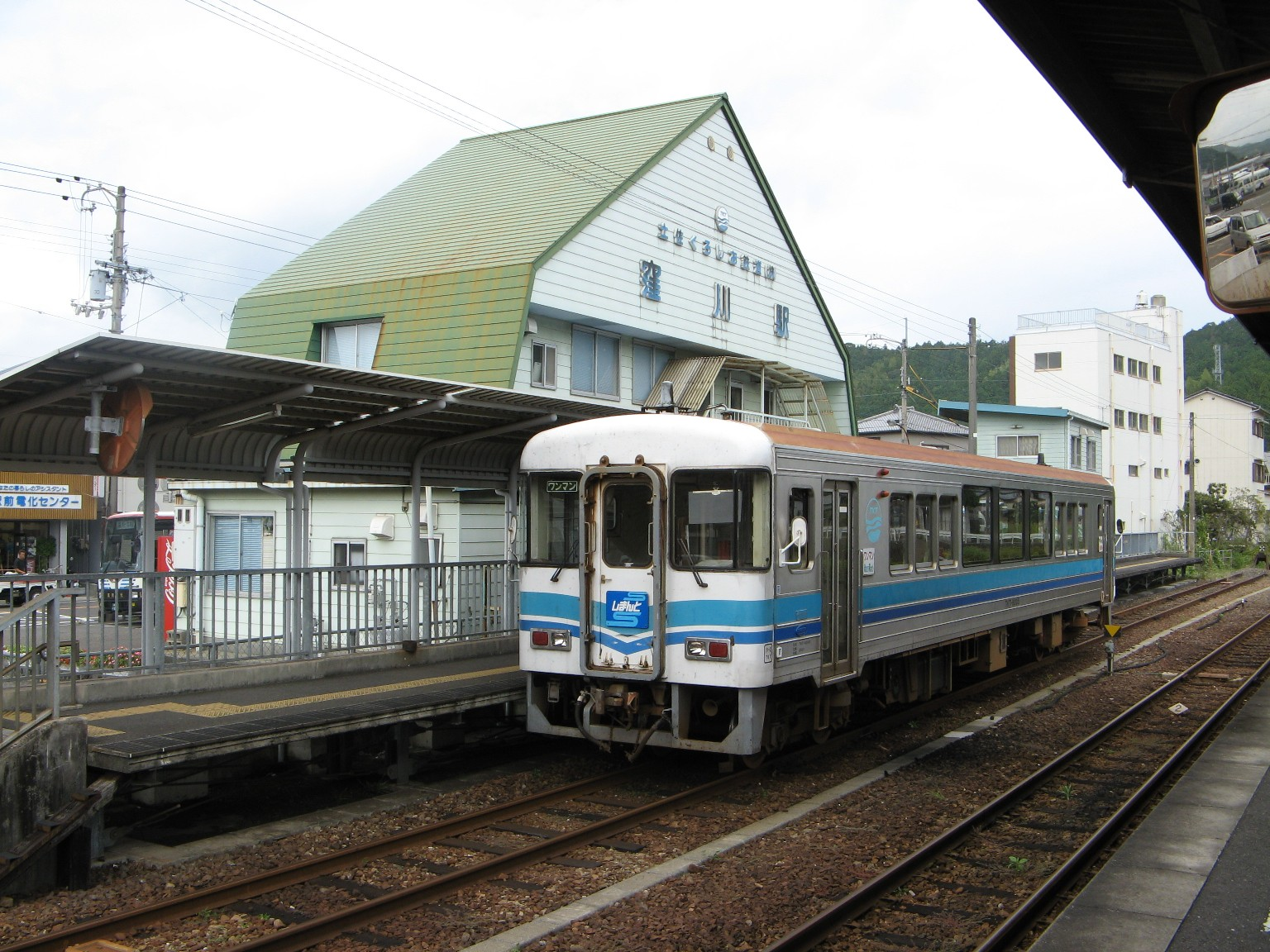
Platform 1 of Kubokawa Station

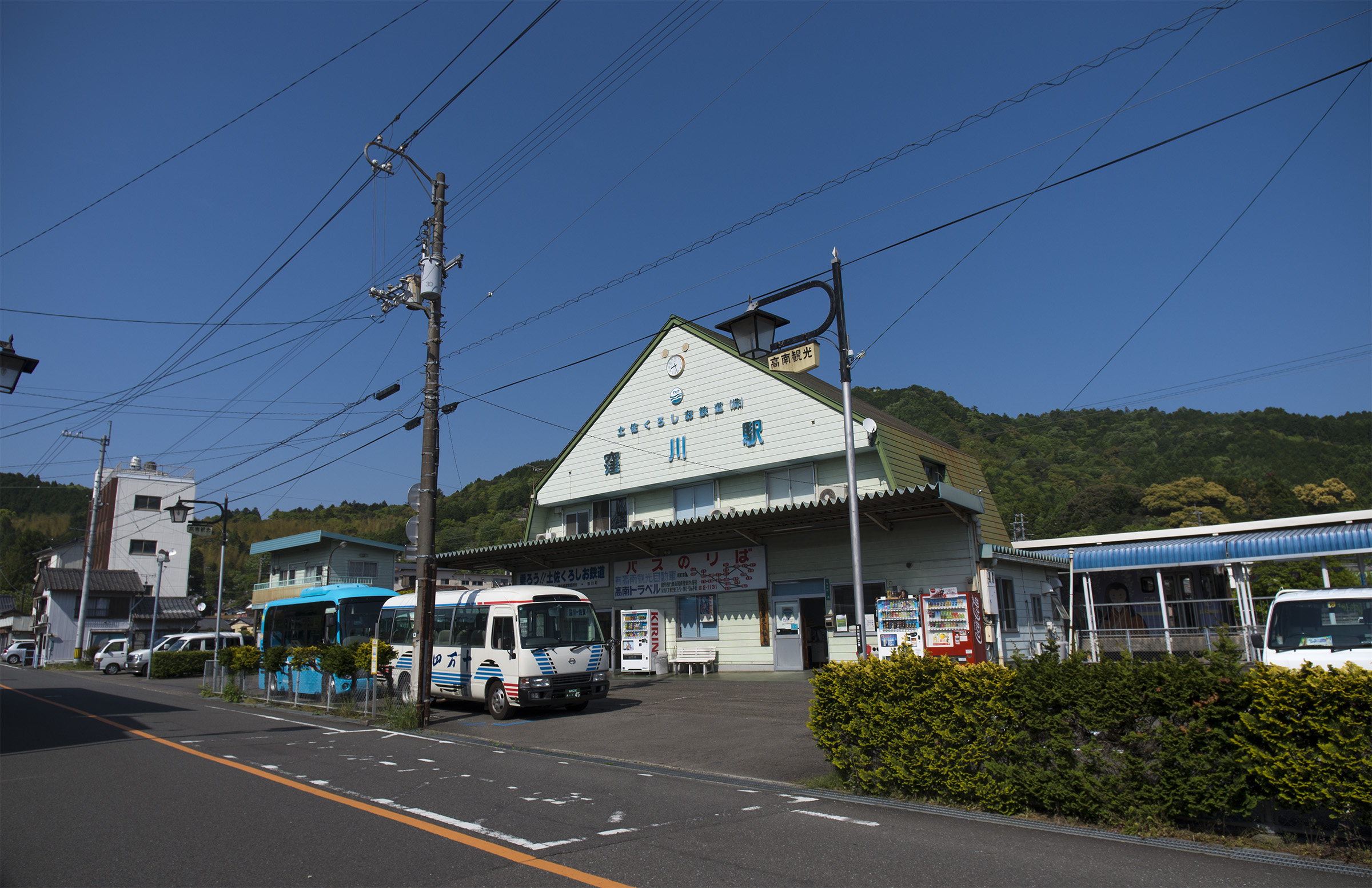
The Tosa Kuroshio Railway station building. The JR station building is to the right.

== Adjacent stations ==
«	Service	»
JR Shikoku
Limited Express Services
Tosa-Kure	Nanpū	Tosa-Saga
Tosa-Kure	Shimanto	Tosa-Saga
Tosa-Kure	Ashizuri	Tosa-Saga
Tosa Kuroshio Railway
Nakamura Line
Terminus	Local	Wakai

== History ==
The station opened on 12 November 1951 under the control of Japanese National Railways as the terminus of the Dosan Line. The JNR Nakamura Line connected to this station on 18 December 1963 and the JNR Yodo Line on 1 March 1974. After the privatization of JNR on 1 April 1987, control of the station passed to JR Shikoku. The JNR Nakamura Line was privatized to the Tosa Kuroshio Railway on 1 April 1988.

== Surrounding area ==
- Iwamoto-ji
- Shimanto River
- Shimanto Town Hall

== See also ==
- List of railway stations in Japan
