= Tosa Kuroshio Railway =

Japanese railway company

Tosa Kuroshio Railway 土佐くろしお鉄道
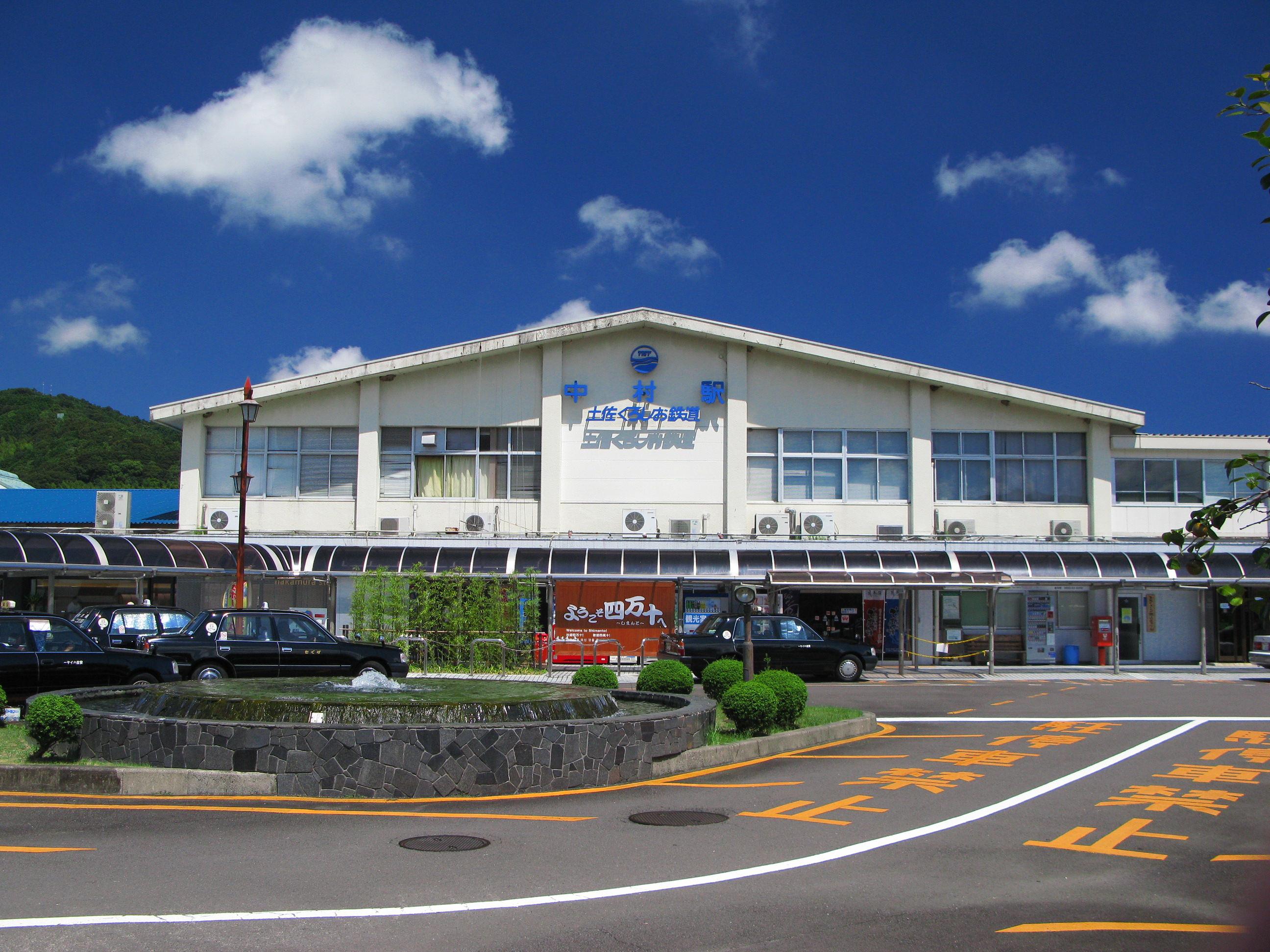
- The station building of Nakamura, which is the location of the railway's headquarters

Overview
- Headquarters: Kuroshio, Kōchi Prefecture, Japan
- Locale: Southern Kōchi Prefecture
- Dates of operation: 8 May 1986–present

Technical
- Track gauge: 1,067 mm (3 ft 6 in)
- Length: 109.3 km (67.9 mi)

Other
- Website: Official website

The Tosa Kuroshio Railway (土佐くろしお鉄道, Tosa Kuroshio Tetsudō) is a third-sector railway company in Kōchi Prefecture, Japan. The name comes from the former Tosa Province and the Kuroshio Current. The company was founded in 1986, and operates three lines: a former Japanese National Railways (JNR) line (the Nakamura Line) and two planned JNR lines on which construction had commenced but then been suspended due to JNR construction funds being diverted to shinkansen projects in the 1980s (the Sukumo and Asa lines). After its formation, the company recommenced construction and subsequently opened the lines and now operates them.

== Ownership ==
As of January 2013, shares in the company are owned by Kōchi Prefecture (49.1%), the city of Sukumo (8.3%), the city of Aki (7.3%), the city of Shimanto (6.4%), and Shikoku Bank (4.8%).

== Lines ==
Tosa Kuroshio Railway operates the following three lines.

- Nakamura Line (labeled "TK")
  - Kubokawa — Nakamura (43.0 km)
- Sukumo Line (labeled "TK")
  - Nakamura — Sukumo (23.6 km)
- Asa Line (labeled "GN")
  - The official nickname is Gomen-Nahari Line (ごめん・なはり線).
  - Gomen — Nahari (42.7 km)

=== Station numbering ===
Each company station has a unique alphanumeric label that complements the Shikoku Railway Company (JR Shikoku) system, designed to assist passengers unfamiliar with the lines, especially at transfer stations. For example, JR Gomen Station's label is "D40", while "GN40" is the label of Tosa Gomen Station.

== Rolling stock ==
As of April 2014, the company owned a fleet of 23 diesel multiple unit cars as shown below.

- 2000 series (1 x 4-car set, identical design to JR Shikoku 2000 series)
- TKT-8000 series single-car units (8 cars, built 1988 to 1999)
- 9640 series single-car units (11 cars, built 2002) ("9640" can be read as "Kuroshio" in Japanese)

== History ==
The Tosa Kuroshio Railway was founded on 8 May 1986 for the purpose of resuming construction of the Sukumo and Asa lines, which had been planned by JNR but abandoned. The company however first took over control of operations on the 43.0 km former JNR Nakamura Line (Kubokawa to Nakamura) from 1 April 1988, as its continued operation was a requisite for opening the Sukumo Line. The company opened the 23.6 km Sukumo Line (Sukumo to Nakamura) on 1 October 1997, and the 42.7 km Asa Line (Gomen to Nahari) on 1 July 2002.

== See also ==
- List of railway companies in Japan
