= List of cultural properties of Japan – structures (Kōchi) =

This list is of the cultural properties of Japan designated in the category of structures (建造物, kenzōbutsu) for the Prefecture of Kōchi.

== National Cultural Properties ==
As of 1 June 2015, twenty Important Cultural Properties (including one *National Treasure) with sixty component structures have been designated, being of national significance.

Property	Date	Municipality	Comments	Image	Coordinates	Ref.
*Buraku-ji Yakushi-dō 豊楽寺薬師堂; Burakuji Yakushi-dō	1151	Ōtoyo			33°47′32″N 133°43′38″E	
Yasuoka Family Residence 安岡家住宅; Yasuoka-ke jūtaku	1828-67	Kōnan	designation comprises four components: the main residence (1828), and tool storehouse, rice storehouse, and kamaya (cooking building) (all 1830-67)		32°43′59″N 132°59′02″E	
Yoshifuku Family Residence 吉福家住宅; Yoshifuku-ke jūtaku	1901	Tosashimizu	designation comprises four components: the main residence, barn, kamaya, and gate house		33°34′41″N 133°44′08″E	
Former Sekikawa Family Residence 旧関川家住宅 kyū-Sekikawa-ke jūtaku	1819-1925	Kōchi	designation comprises four components: the main residence (1819), front gate (1868-1911), tool storehouse (1912–25), and rice storehouse (1893)		33°35′16″N 133°34′26″E	
Former Yanase Forest Railway Facilities 旧魚梁瀬森林鉄道施設 kyū-Yanase shinrin tetsudō shisetsu	1911-41	Nahari, Tano, Yasuda, Kitagawa, Umaji	designation comprises fourteen components: five tunnels (four 1911, one 1913) and nine bridges (1924–41)		33°29′15″N 134°00′09″E	
Former Yamanouchi Family Residence Nagaya 旧山内家下屋敷長屋 kyū-Yamanouchi-ke shimoyashiki nagaya	1864	Kōchi			33°33′22″N 133°31′59″E	
Takeuchi Family Residence 旧竹内家住宅 kyū-Takeuchi-ke jūtaku	1701-1800	Shimanto			33°11′35″N 132°58′14″E	
Former Tajikawa Bansho Shoin 旧立川番所書院 kyū-Tajikawa bansho shoin	1797	Ōtoyo			33°50′56″N 133°38′58″E	
Konrin-ji Yakushidō 金林寺薬師堂; Konrinji Yakushidō	1401-1500	Umaji			33°33′02″N 134°02′48″E	
Kōchi Castle 高知城; Kōchi-jō	1661-1803	Kōchi	designation comprises fifteen components: the tenshu (1747), kaitokukan (1749), storehouse (1747–49), four gates (1730-1803), two turrets (1661-1803), and six sections of wall with arrow holes (1747–49)		33°33′39″N 133°31′54″E	
Kokubun-ji Kondō 国分寺金堂; Kokubunji kondō	1558	Nankoku			33°35′56″N 133°38′24″E	
Yamanake Family Residence 山中家住宅; Yamanake-ke jūtaku	1701-1800	Ino			33°43′49″N 133°14′11″E	
Takemura Family Residence 竹村家住宅; Takemura-ke jūtaku	1730-1867	Sakawa	designation comprises three components: the main residence (1780), storehouse (1830–67), and front gate (1838)		33°29′57″N 133°17′23″E	
Chikurin-ji Hondō 竹林寺本堂; Chikurinji hondō	1467-1572	Kōchi			33°32′47″N 133°34′36″E	
Asakura Jinja Honden 朝倉神社本殿; Asakura Jinja honden	1657	Kōchi			33°33′13″N 133°28′54″E	
Tosa Jinja Korō 土佐神社楼門; Tosa Jinja korō	1369	Kōchi			33°35′32″N 133°34′38″E	
Tosa Jinja Honden, Heiden-Haiden 土佐神社本殿、幣殿及び拝殿; Tosa Jinja honden, heiden oyobi haiden	1571	Kōchi	designation comprises two components		33°35′34″N 133°34′37″E	
Tosa Jinja Rōmon 土佐神社楼門; Tosa Jinja rōmon	1631	Kōchi			33°35′22″N 133°34′37″E	
Fuwa Hachimangū Honden 不破八幡宮本殿; Fuwa Hachimangū honden	1559	Shimanto			32°58′51″N 132°56′15″E	
Otonashi Jinja 鳴無神社; Otonashi Jinja	1663	Susaki	designation comprises two components: the honden and heiden-haiden		33°24′51″N 133°22′08″E	

== Prefectural Cultural Properties ==
As of 1 May 2014, eleven properties have been designated at a prefectural level.

Property	Date	Municipality	Comments	Image	Coordinates	Ref.
Kannonshō-ji Kannondō 観音正寺観音堂; Kannonshōji Kannondō		Kōchi			33°31′08″N 133°30′23″E	
Kaiseimon 開成門; Kaiseimon	1866	Kōchi	relocated in 1969		33°33′52″N 133°31′31″E	
Chikurin-ji Kyakuden 竹林寺客殿; Chikurinji kyakuden	Edo period	Kōchi			33°32′48″N 133°34′39″E	
Former Chidōkan Front Gate and Guardhouse Fences 旧致道館表門及び附番所東西築地塀 kyū-Chidōkan omotemon oyobi fu bansho tōzai tsuijihei		Kōchi	Tosa Domain Han school		33°33′41″N 133°31′44″E	
Kokubun-ji Hondō Zushi and Shumidan 国分寺本堂の厨子・須弥壇; Kokubunji hondō no zushi・shumidan		Nankoku			33°35′56″N 133°38′25″E	
Kotohira Jinja 琴平神社; Kotohira Jinja		Tosa			33°30′45″N 133°24′35″E	
Takachiniimasu Jinja Honden 高知座神社本殿; Takachiniimasu Jinja honden	1768	Sukumo			32°57′04″N 132°48′01″E	
Ōkawakami Birafu Jinja Shaden 大川上美良布神社社殿; Ōkawakami Birafu Jinja shaden	1869	Kami			33°38′59″N 133°47′02″E	
Okagoden 岡御殿; Okagoden	1842	Tano			33°25′36″N 134°00′34″E	
Former Oka Family Residence 旧岡家住宅（西の岡） kyū-Oka-ke jūtaku (nishi no Oka)		Tano			33°25′36″N 134°00′33″E	
Kōnomine Jinja Honden 神峯神社本殿; Kōnomine Jinja honden	mid/late Edo period	Yasuda			33°28′08″N 133°58′31″E	

== Municipal Cultural Properties ==
As of 1 May 2014, eighty-eight properties have been designated at a municipal level.

== Registered Cultural Properties ==
As of 1 June 2015, two hundred and seventy-three properties at ninety-four sites have been registered (as opposed to designated) at a national level.

== See also ==
- Cultural Properties of Japan
- National Treasures of Japan
- List of Historic Sites of Japan (Kōchi)
- List of Cultural Properties of Japan - paintings (Kōchi)
- List of Cultural Properties of Japan - historical materials (Kōchi)
