= Kitagawa, Kōchi =

Kitagawa 北川村
- Village
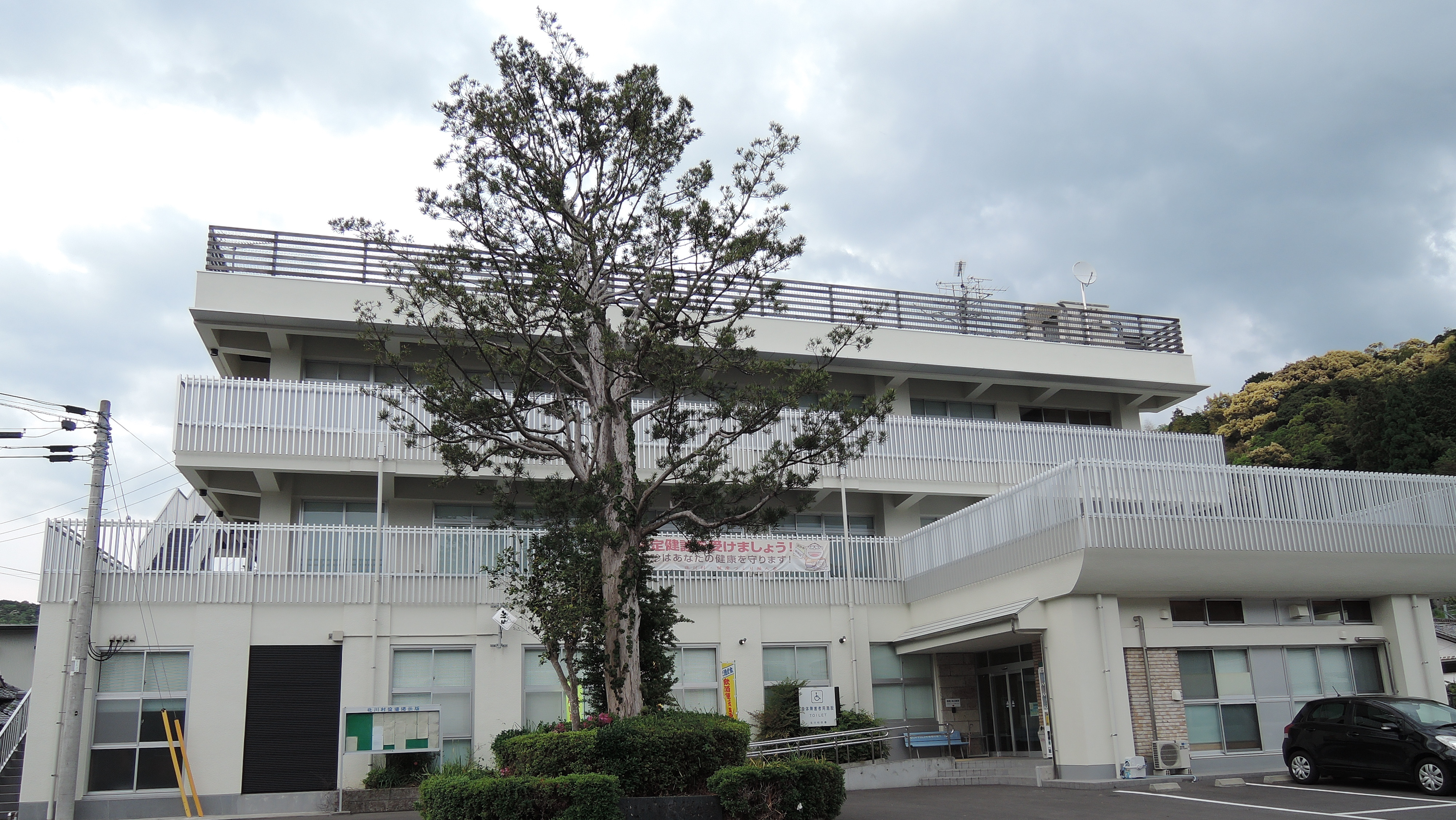
- Kitagawa village hall

- Flag Chapter
- Interactive map of Kitagawa
- Location in Japan
- Coordinates: 33°27′N 134°3′E
- Country: Japan
- Region: Shikoku
- Prefecture: Kōchi
- District: Aki

Area
  - Total: 196.73 km^{2} (75.96 sq mi)

Population (June 30, 2022)
  - Total: 1,228
  - Density: 6.242/km^{2} (16.17/sq mi)
- Time zone: UTC+09:00 (JST)
- City hall address: 1530 Notomo Kō, Kitagawa-mura, Aki-gun, Kōchi-ken 781-6441
- Website: Official website
- Symbols
- Bird: Warbling white-eye
- Flower: Pyrus pyrifolia
- Tree: Paulownia tomentosa

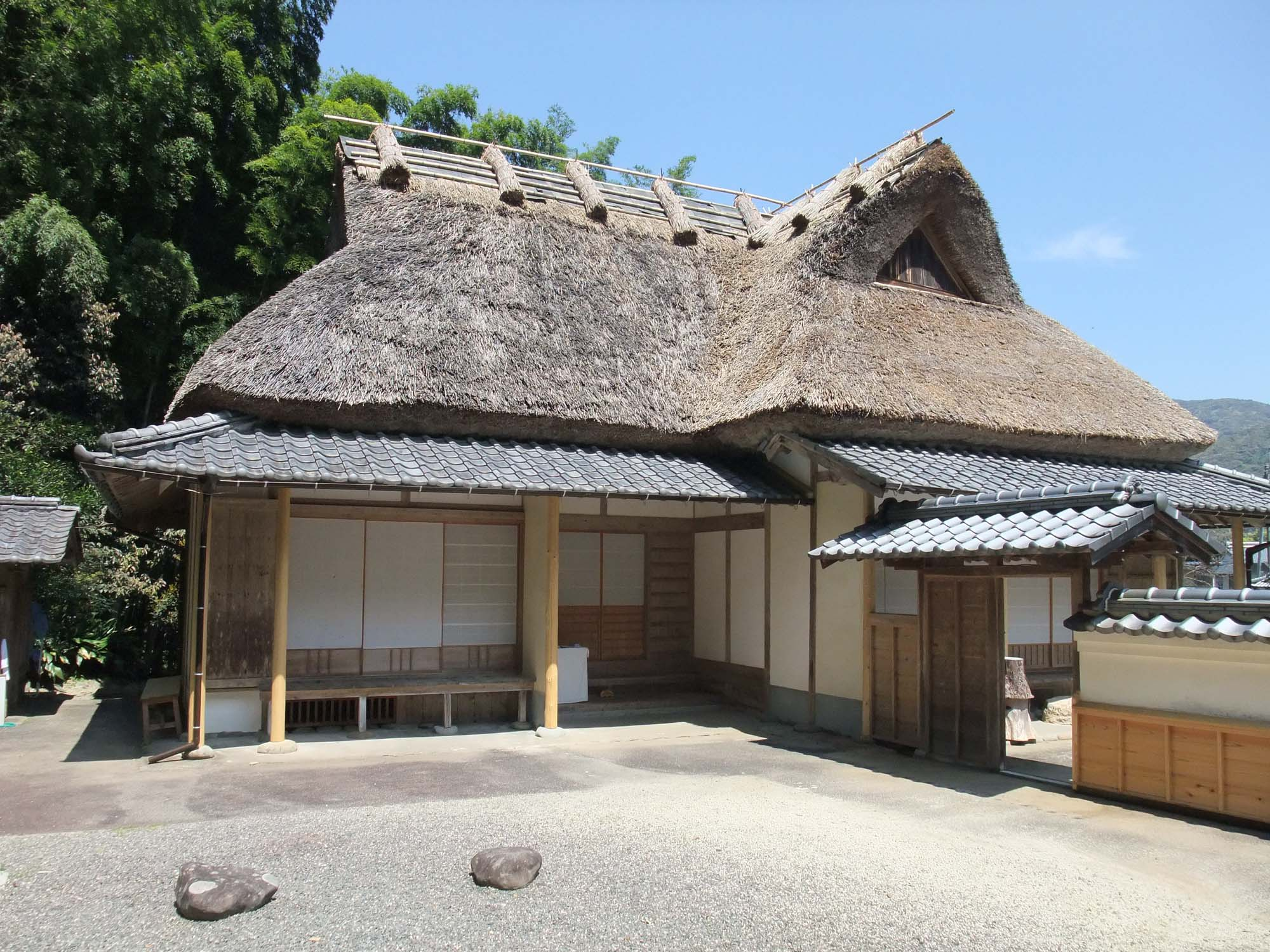
birthplace of Nakaoka Shintaro

Kitagawa Monet Marmottan Water garden

Kitagawa (北川村, Kitagawa-mura) is a village located in Aki District, Kōchi Prefecture, Japan. As of 30 June 2022, the village had an estimated population of 1,228 in 612 households and a population density of 6.2 persons per km^{2}. The total area of the village is 196.73 square kilometres (75.96 sq mi).

== Geography ==
Kitagawa is located in northeastern Kōchi Prefecture on the island of Shikoku. It is situated on a mountainous area.

=== Neighbouring municipalities ===
Kōchi Prefecture

- Muroto
- Nahari
- Tano
- Tasuda
- Tōyō
- Umaji

Tokushima Prefecture

- Kaiyō

=== Climate ===
Kitagawa has a humid subtropical climate (Köppen Cfa) characterized by warm summers and cool winters with light snowfall. The average annual temperature in Kitagawa is 14.3 °C. The average annual rainfall is 2543 mm with September as the wettest month. The temperatures are highest on average in July, at around 24.1 °C, and lowest in January, at around 4.3 °C.

== Demographics ==
Per Japanese census data, the population of Kitagawa peaked around 1960 and decreased precipitously in the following decade. The population has continued to gradually decline since then.

Historical population
Year	Pop.	±%
1920	3,514	—
1930	4,836	+37.6%
1940	3,509	−27.4%
1950	4,537	+29.3%
1960	6,000	+32.2%
1970	2,584	−56.9%
1980	1,907	−26.2%
1990	1,706	−10.5%
2000	1,591	−6.7%
2010	1,367	−14.1%
2020	1,146	−16.2%

== History ==
As with all of Kōchi Prefecture, the area of Kitagawa was part of ancient Tosa Province. The name of Aki District appears in Nara period . During the Edo period, the area was part of the holdings of Tosa Domain ruled by the Yamauchi clan from their seat at Kōchi Castle. The village of Kitagawa was established with the creation of the modern municipalities system on October 1, 1889.

== Government ==
Kitagawa has a mayor-council form of government with a directly elected mayor and a unicameral village council of eight members. Kitagawa, together with the other municipalities of Aki District, contributes one member to the Kōchi Prefectural Assembly. In terms of national politics, the village is part of Kōchi 1st district of the lower house of the Diet of Japan.

== Economy ==
Kitagawa's economy is centered on forestry and citrus fruit tree cultivation (yuzu).

== Education ==
Kitagawa has one public elementary school and one public middle school operated by the village government. The village does not have a high school.

== Transportation ==
=== Railway ===
The village does not have any passenger railway service. The nearest train station is Nahari Station on the Tosa Kuroshio Railway.

=== Highways ===
- National Route 493

== Local attractions ==
- Yanase Dam
- Kitagawa Monet Marmottan Water Garden

== Noted people from Kitagawa ==
- Nakaoka Shintarō, Bakumatsu period samurai
