= Umaji, Kōchi =

Umaji 馬路村
- Village
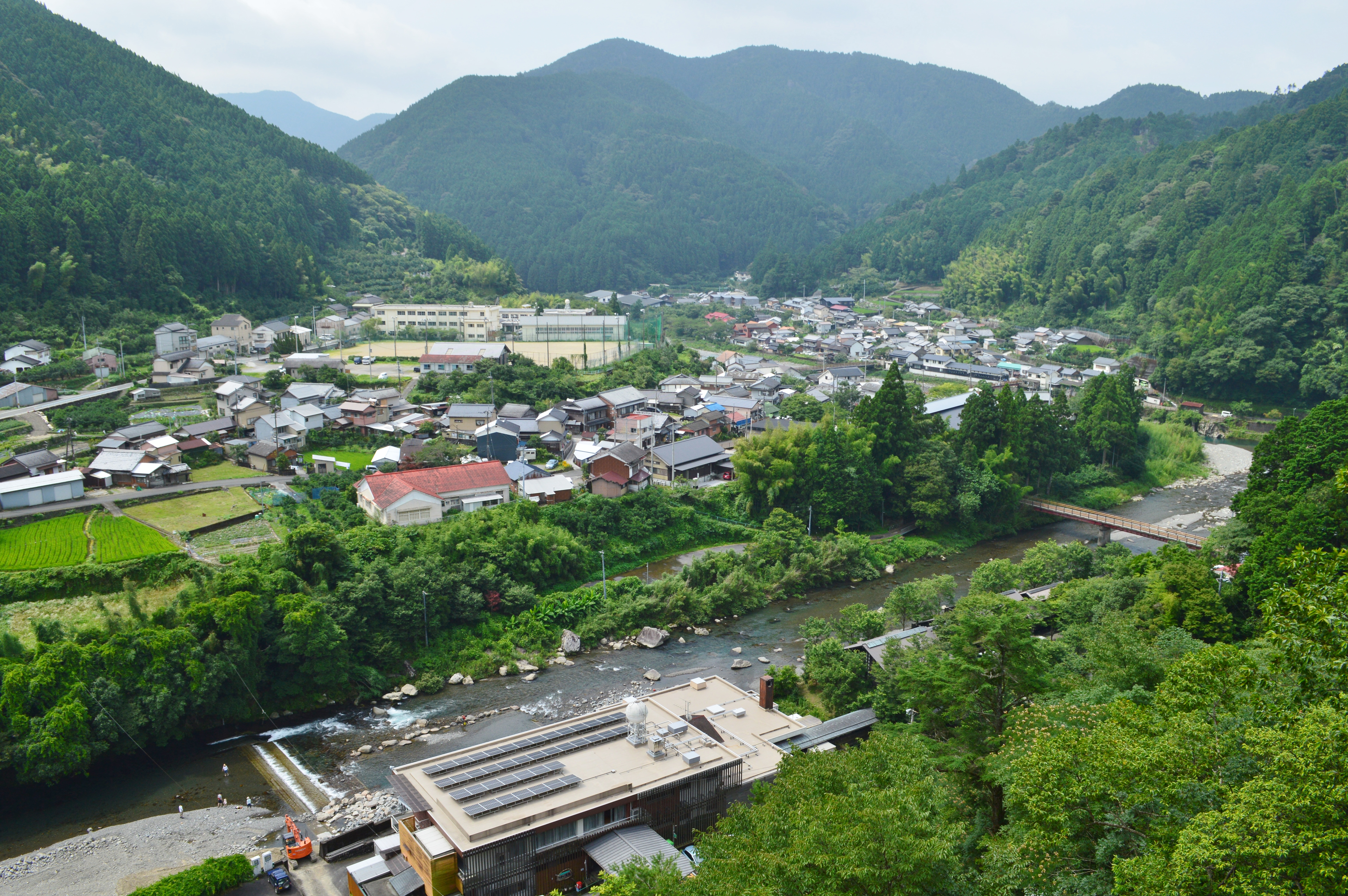
- View of Umaji

- Flag Chapter
- Location of Umaji in Kōchi Prefecture

- Location in Japan
- Coordinates: 33°33′17″N 134°02′54″E
- Country: Japan
- Region: Shikoku
- Prefecture: Kōchi
- District: Aki

Government
  - Mayor: Yamasaki Izuru

Area
  - Total: 165.48 km^{2} (63.89 sq mi)

Population (June 30, 2022)
  - Total: 834
  - Density: 5.04/km^{2} (13.1/sq mi)
- Time zone: UTC+09:00 (JST)
- City hall address: 443 Umaji, Umaji-mura, Kōchi-ken 781-6201
- Website: Official website
- Symbols
- Bird: Blue-and-white flycatcher
- Flower: Yuzu
- Tree: Cryptomeria

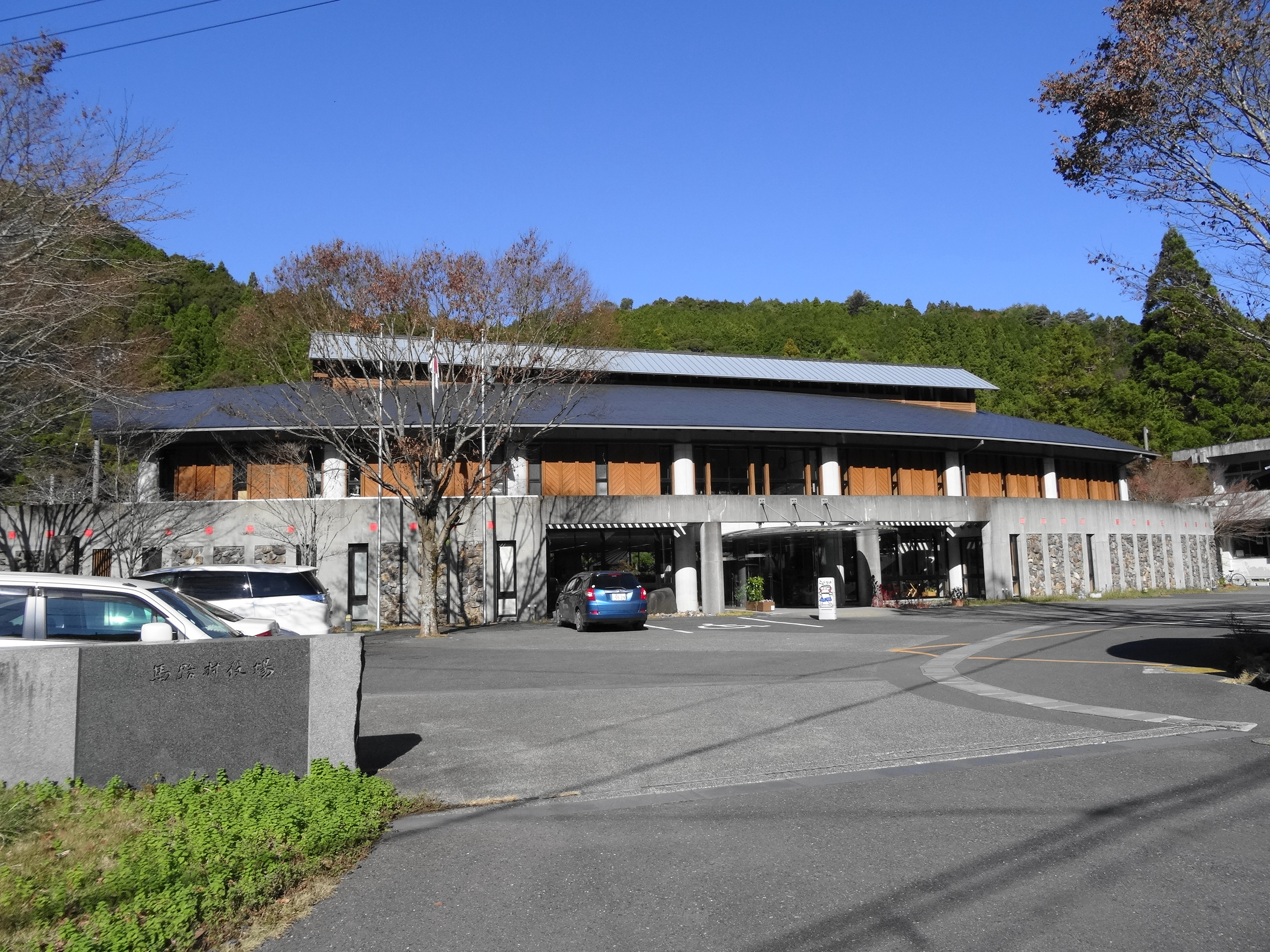
Umaji Village Hall

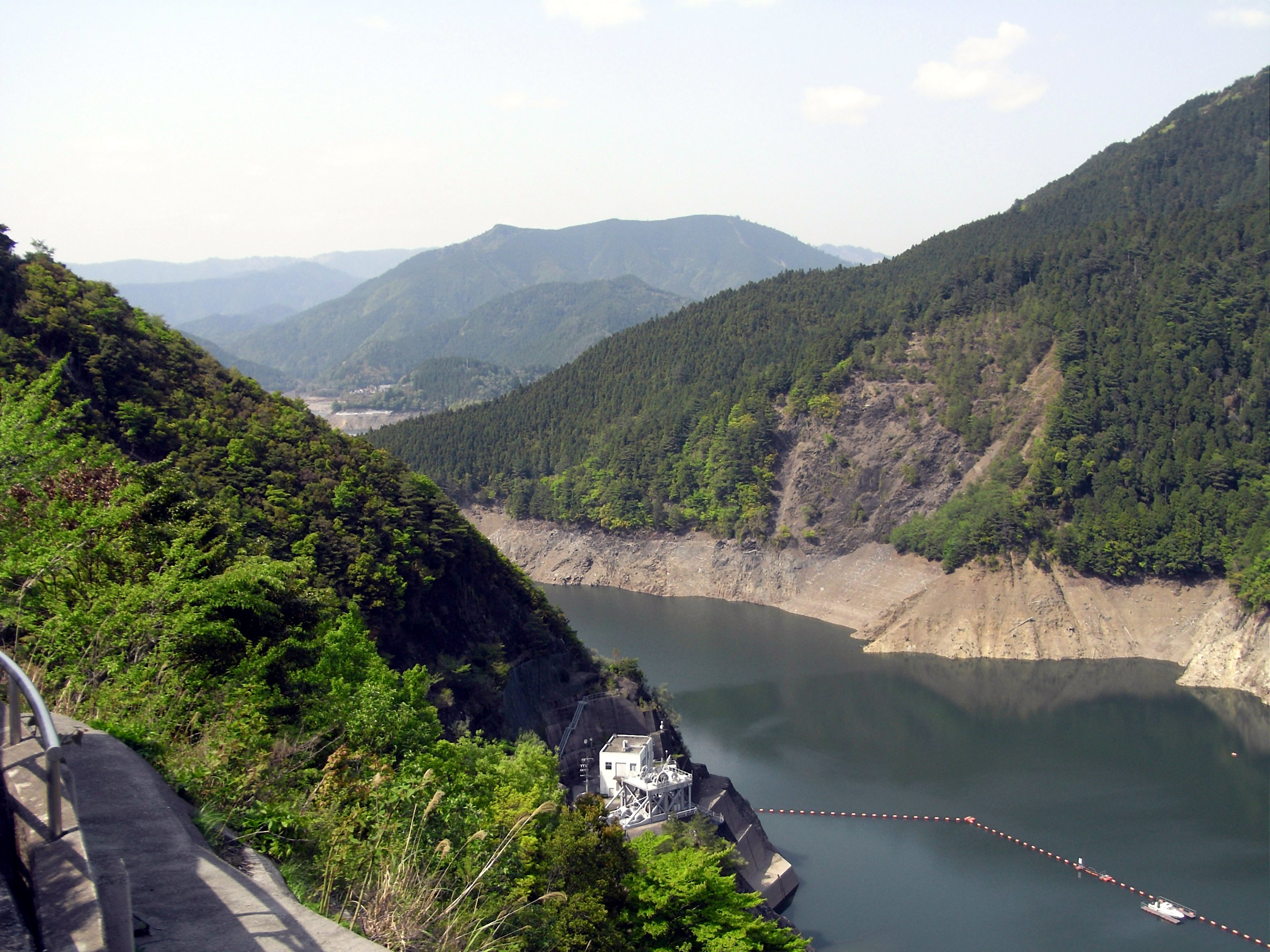
Yanase Dam

Umaji (馬路村, Umaji-mura) is the second smallest village in Kōchi Prefecture, located in Aki District, Kōchi Prefecture, Japan. As of 30 June 2022, the village had an estimated population of 834 in 424 households and a population density of 5.0 persons per km^{2}. The total area of the village is 39.60 square kilometres (15.29 sq mi). Umaji has been branded as one of the most beautiful villages in Japan.

== Geography ==
Umaji is located in a mountainous region in northeastern Kōchi Prefecture on the island of Shikoku. The Yasuda River flows through the village, which is divided into the Umaji area and the Yanase area. Road traffic between the two areas must go through the town of Kitagawa . Approximately 96% of the village is covered by forests, 75% of which are protected by the government. Major mountains include Mount Eboshi (1,320m) and Jinkichimori (1,423m).

=== Neighboring municipalities ===
Kōchi Prefecture

- Aki
- Kitagawa
- Tano
- Yasuda

Tokushima Prefecture

- Kaiyō
- Naka

=== Climate ===
Umaji has a humid subtropical climate (Köppen Cfa) characterized by warm summers and cool winters with light snowfall. The average annual temperature in Umaji is 13.5 °C. The average annual rainfall is 2573 mm with September as the wettest month. The temperatures are highest on average in January at around 23.6 °C, and lowest in January, at around 3.6 °C.

== Demographics ==
Per Japanese census data, the population of Umaji has decreased steadily since the 1960s.

Historical population
Year	Pop.	±%
1920	2,380	—
1930	2,604	+9.4%
1940	2,737	+5.1%
1950	2,839	+3.7%
1960	3,425	+20.6%
1970	2,134	−37.7%
1980	1,740	−18.5%
1990	1,313	−24.5%
2000	1,195	−9.0%
2010	1,013	−15.2%
2020	745	−26.5%

== History ==
As with all of Kōchi Prefecture, the area of Umaji was part of ancient Tosa Province. The name of Aki District appears in Nara period records. During the Edo period, the area was part of the holdings of Tosa Domain ruled by the Yamauchi clan from their seat at Kōchi Castle. The village of Umaji was established with the creation of the modern municipalities system on October 1, 1889. The village has been on the verge of merging with nearby municipalities, but it has retained a strong sense of independence.

== Government ==
Umaji has a mayor-council form of government with a directly elected mayor and a unicameral village council of eight members. Umaji, together with the other municipalities of Aki District, contributes one member to the Kōchi Prefectural Assembly. In terms of national politics, the village is part of Kōchi 1st district of the lower house of the Diet of Japan.

== Economy ==
The local economy is centered on forestry and related wood-processing industries, as well as horticulture. Yanase sugi has been famous for hundreds of years. In the Edo period, it was designated as a protected asset by Tosa Domain. It became the prefectural tree, and is used for architecture and sculpting. Beginning in the 1960s, Umaji has been a hub for the production of yuzu. Whilst other areas have merged to make farming cooperatives, Umaji village seeks to remain independent, branding the village itself as a product.

Umaji's main yuzu products are its yuzu ponzu range and its successful yuzu drink, "Gokkun Umajimura". Its yuzu products have become a national brand, appearing in several TV commercials over the years.

== Education ==
Umaji has two public combined elementary/middle schools operated by the village government. The village does not have a high school.

== Transportation ==
=== Railway ===
Umaji has no passenger railway service. The nearest station is Yasuda Station on the Tosa Kuroshio Railway in the neighboring town of Yasuda, about 30 minutes away by car.

=== Highway ===
Umaji is not on any national highway or expressway.

== Local attractions ==
As well as two hot springs and several campsites, Umaji has a forest train, craft workshops, a village tour and other tourist activities.

=== Notable temples ===
- Konrinji (金林寺) The Yaskushi hall is designated as an important cultural property.

=== Notable shrines ===
- Kumano Shrine (熊野神社) Designated as a prefectural tangible cultural property.
- Yanase Kumano Shrine

=== Parks ===
- Yanase Prefectural Nature Park (魚梁瀬県立自然公園)
  - Maruyama Park (Yanase Hot Springs, Forest Railway, Cherry Blossoms)
  - Yanase Big Bridge (Yanase Dam)

=== Nature ===
- Higashigawa Ravine (東川渓谷)
- Mount Senbon (千本山) (Home to one of the 100 Forest Giants)
- Nishigawa Ravine (西川渓谷)

=== Festivals and events ===
- Yuzu Hajimaru Festival (First Sunday of November)
- Yanase Sakura Festival (Beginning of April)
- FESTIVAL Yanase (Mid-July)
- Onsen Festival (August 15)
- Umaji Oshidori Marathon (Beginning of October)
- Kumano Shrine Festival (Yanase: Mid October, Umaji: First weekend of December)

=== Special products ===
- Inakazushi (sushi made with yuzu sushi vinegar and mountain vegetables)
- Shiitake mushrooms
- Yanase cedar (for architecture and sculpting)
- Yuzu and yuzu products (yuzu juice 'Gokkun Umajimura', ponzu soy sauce 'Yuzu no Mura', etc.)
