= Kotomine =

Kotomine can refer to:

- Kirei Kotomine, a character from Fate/stay night
- Risei Kotomine, a character from Fate/zero

== See also ==
- Kotomin House, a historical building in Saint Petersburg, Russia
- Kōnomine Castle, a castle in Yamaguchi, Japan
- Kōnomine-ji, a Shingon Buddhist Temple in Yasuda, Kōchi, Japan
