= Nahari, Kōchi =

Nahari 奈半利町
- Town
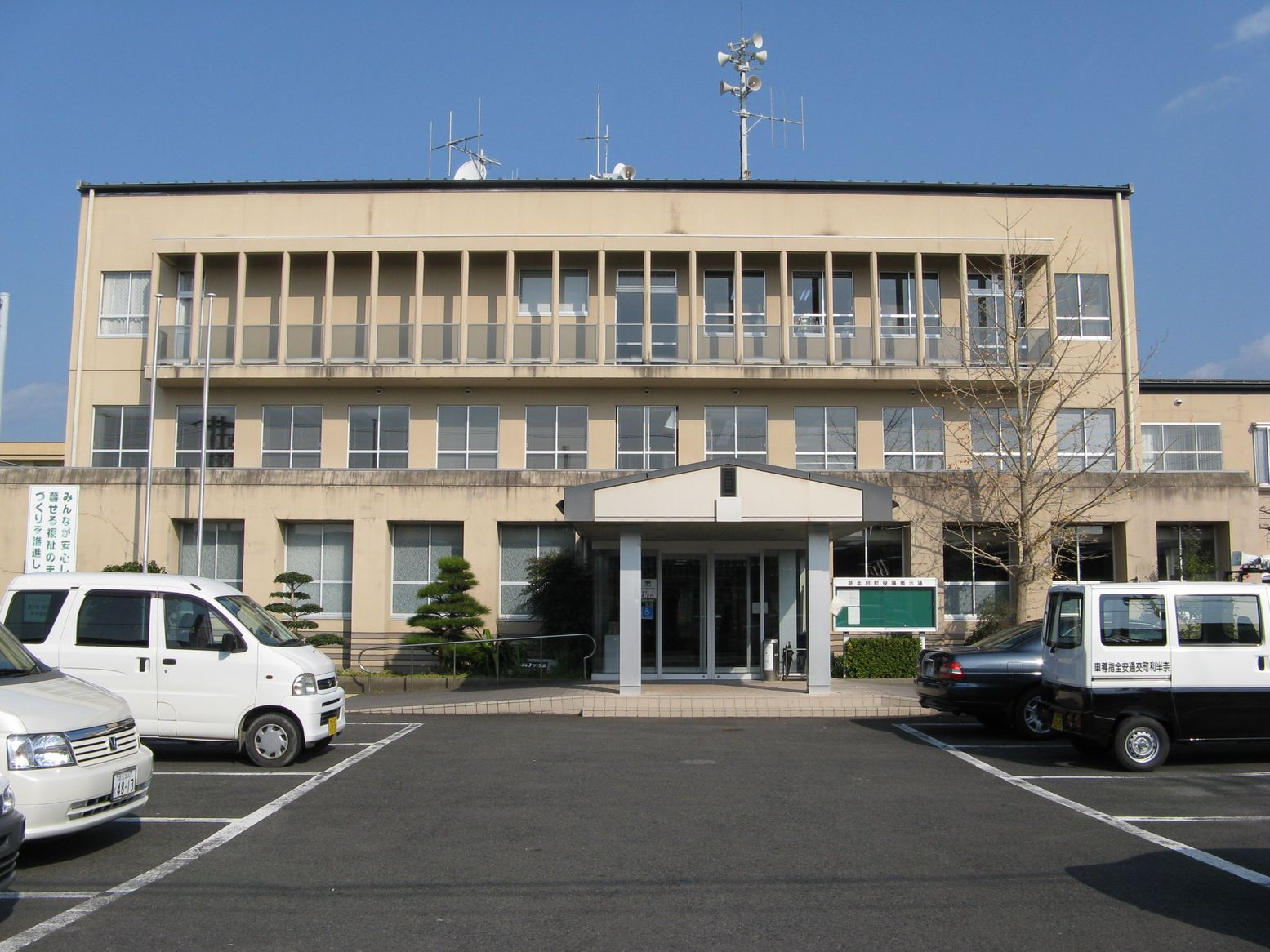
- Nahari town hall

- Flag Chapter
- Location of Nahari in Kōchi Prefecture

- Location in Japan
- Coordinates: 33°25′N 134°1′E
- Country: Japan
- Region: Shikoku
- Prefecture: Kōchi
- District: Aki

Area
  - Total: 28.36 km^{2} (10.95 sq mi)

Population (April 1, 2026)
  - Total: 2,662
  - Density: 93.86/km^{2} (243.1/sq mi)
- Time zone: UTC+09:00 (JST)
- City hall address: 1659 Ōtsu, Nahari-chō, Aki-gun, Kōchi-ken 781-6402
- Website: Official website
- Symbols
- Bird: Warbling white-eye
- Tree: Sakura

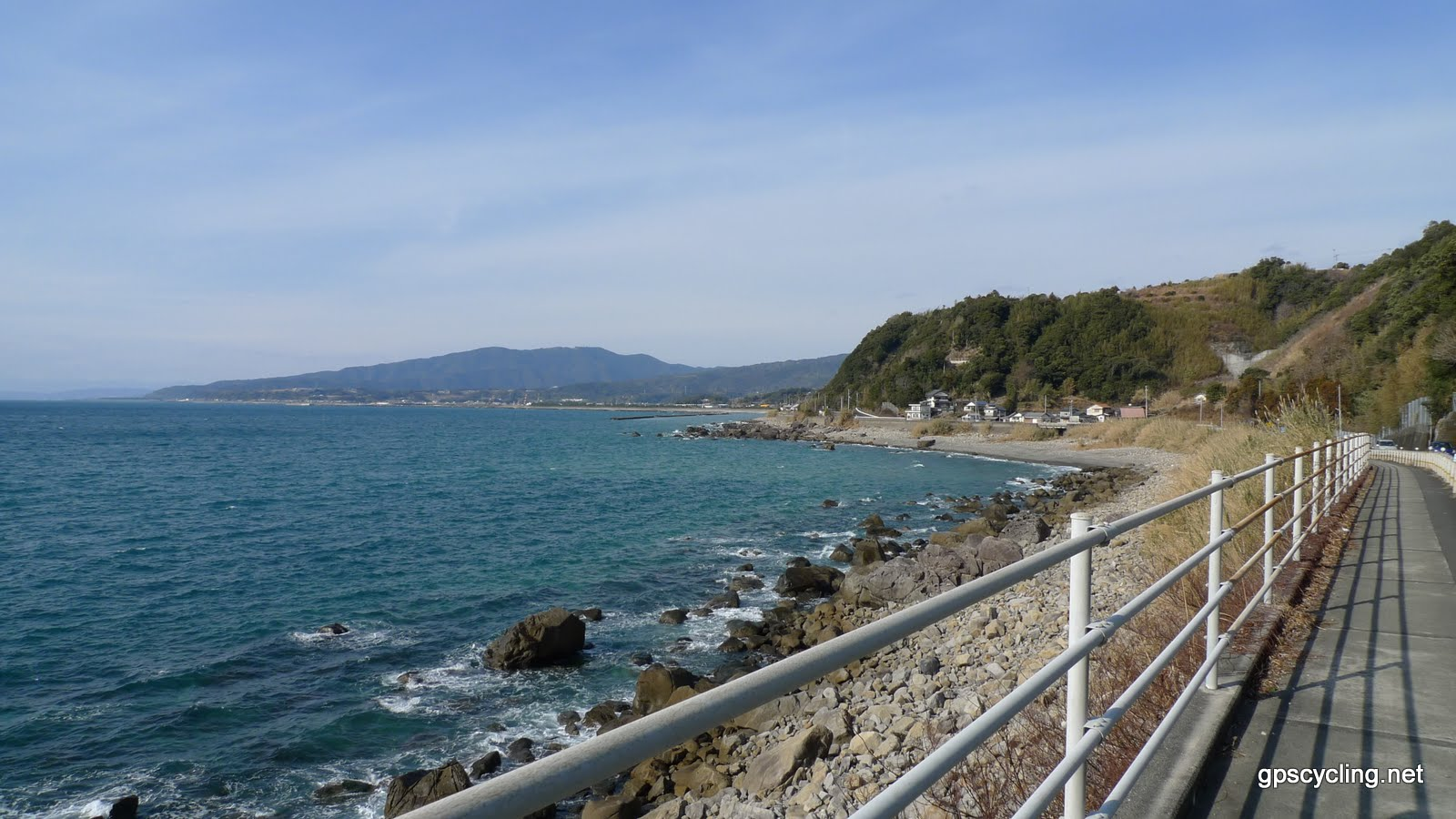
coastal road in Nahari

Nahari (奈半利町, Nahari-chō) is a town located in Aki District, Kōchi Prefecture, Japan. As of 1 January 2022, the town had an estimated population of 2,662 and a population density of 93.8 persons per km^{2}. The total area of the town is 28.36 square kilometres (10.95 sq mi).

== Geography ==
Nahari is located in southeastern Kōchi Prefecture on the island of Shikoku, with a coastline the Pacific Ocean to the southwest.

=== Neighbouring municipalities ===
Kōchi Prefecture

- Kitagawa
- Muroto
- Tano

=== Climate ===
Nahari has a humid subtropical climate (Köppen Cfa) characterized by warm summers and cool winters with light snowfall. The average annual temperature in Nahari is 16.2 °C. The average annual rainfall is 2541 mm with September as the wettest month. The temperatures are highest on average in August, at around 25.5 °C, and lowest in January, at around 6.7 °C.

== Demographics ==
Per Japanese census data, the population of Nahari has decreased steadily since the 1960s.

Historical population
Year	Pop.	±%
1920	4,848	—
1930	5,170	+6.6%
1940	4,975	−3.8%
1950	7,293	+46.6%
1960	6,914	−5.2%
1970	5,084	−26.5%
1980	4,874	−4.1%
1990	4,527	−7.1%
2000	4,027	−11.0%
2010	3,542	−12.0%
2020	3,034	−14.3%

== History ==
As with all of Kōchi Prefecture, the area of Nahari was part of ancient Tosa Province. The name of Aki District appears in Nara period . During the Edo period, the area was part of the holdings of Tosa Domain ruled by the Yamauchi clan from their seat at Kōchi Castle. The village of Nahari was established with the creation of the modern municipalities system on October 1, 1889. It was raised to town status on May 1, 1916.

== Government ==
Nahari has a mayor-council form of government with a directly elected mayor and a unicameral town council of ten members. Nahari, together with the other municipalities of Aki District, contributes one member to the Kōchi Prefectural Assembly. In terms of national politics, the town is part of Kōchi 1st district of the lower house of the Diet of Japan.

== Economy ==
Nahari's economy is centered on commercial fishing, horticulture, and small ship repair.

== Education ==
Nahari has one public elementary school and one public middle school operated by the town government. The town does not have a high school. The town also had the Karyogo Elementary School, but it closed its doors as a school on March 27, 2022.

== Transportation ==
=== Railway ===
Tosa Kuroshio Railway - Asa Line

- Nahari

=== Highways ===
- National Route 55
- National Route 493
