= Tano Station (Kōchi) =

Railway station in Tano, Kōchi Prefecture, Japan

Coordinates: 33°25′49.16″N 134°0′29.43″E

Tano Station 田野駅
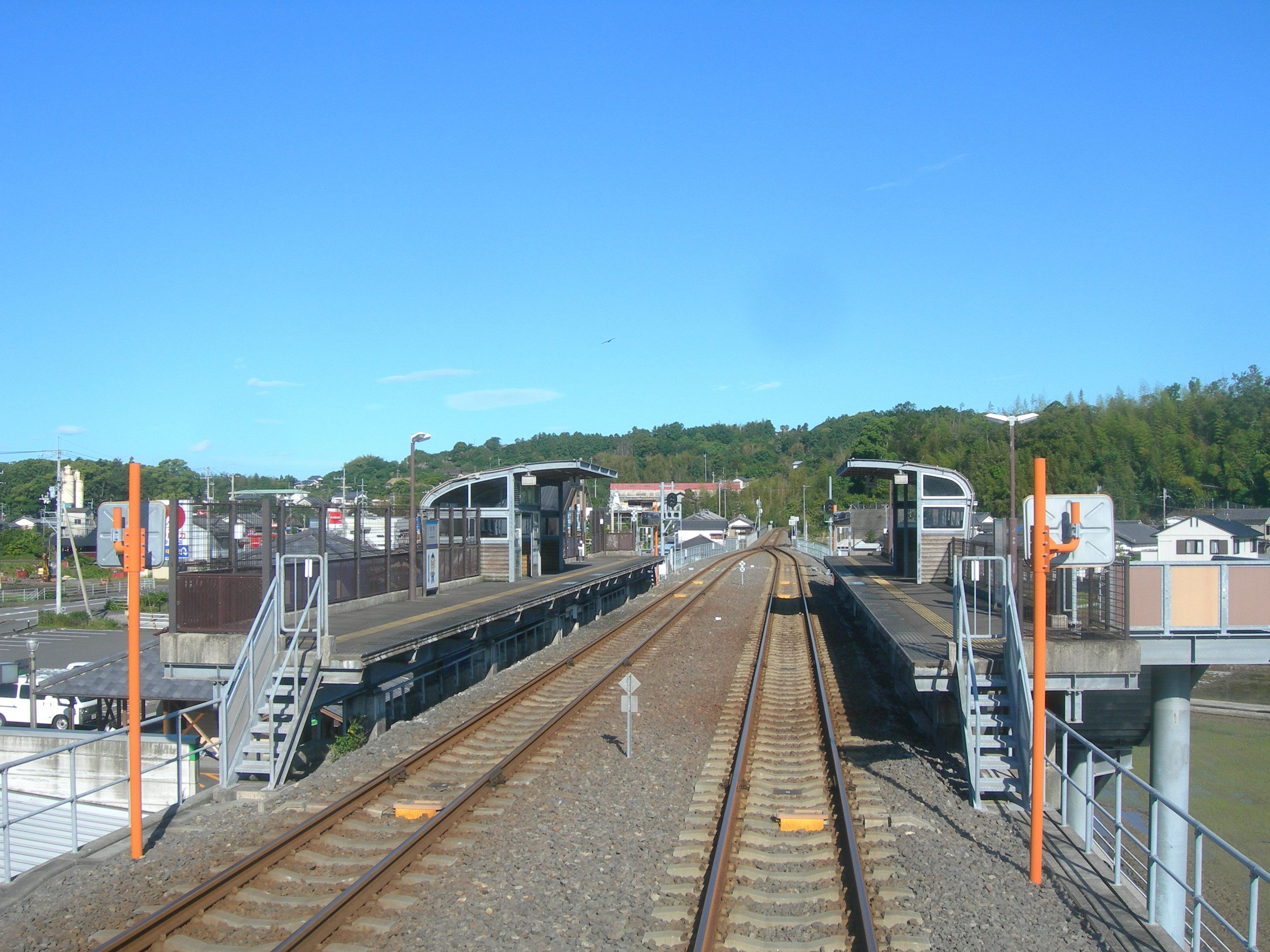
- Tano Station in 2010

General information
- Location: Tano-chō, Aki-gun, Kōchi-ken 781-6410; Japan
- Operator: Tosa Kuroshio Railway
- Line: ■ Asa Line
- Distance: 41.5 km from Gomen
- Platforms: 2 side platforms
- Tracks: 2

Construction
- Structure type: Elevated
- Cycle facilities: Bike shed
- Accessible: No - steps to platform

Other information
- Status: Unstaffed
- Station code: GN22

History
- Opened: 1 July 2002

Passengers
- FY2011: 138 daily
Location
- Location within Kochi Prefecture Location within Japan

Tano Station (田野駅, Tano-eki) is a passenger railway station located in the town of Tano, Aki District, Kōchi Prefecture, Japan. It is operated by the third-sector Tosa Kuroshio Railway with the station number "GN22".

== Lines ==
The station is served by the Asa Line and is located 41.5 km from the beginning of the line at Gomen. All Asa Line trains, rapid and local, stop at the station except for those which start or end their trips at Aki.

== Layout ==
The station consists of two opposed side platforms serving two elevated tracks. There is no station building but both platforms have shelters for waiting passengers. Access to the each platform is by separate flights of steps. Another shelter and a bike shed have been built near the base of the steps.

== Adjacent stations ==
«	Service	»
Asa Line
Yasuda	Rapid	Nahari
Yasuda	Local	Nahari

== Station mascot ==
Each station on the Asa Line features a cartoon mascot character designed by Takashi Yanase, a local cartoonist from Kōchi Prefecture. The mascot for Tano Station is a samurai warrior named Tano Ishin-kun (田野 いしん君).

== History ==
The train station was opened on 1 July 2002 by the Tosa Kuroshio Railway as an intermediate station on its track from Gomen to Nahari.

== Passenger statistics ==
In fiscal 2011, the station was used by an average of 138 passengers daily.

== Surrounding area ==
- Tano Town Office
- Tano Elementary School
- Tano Town Tano Junior High School*
- Kochi Prefectural Junior High School

== See also ==
- List of railway stations in Japan
