= Yasuda, Kōchi =

Yasuda 安田町
- Town
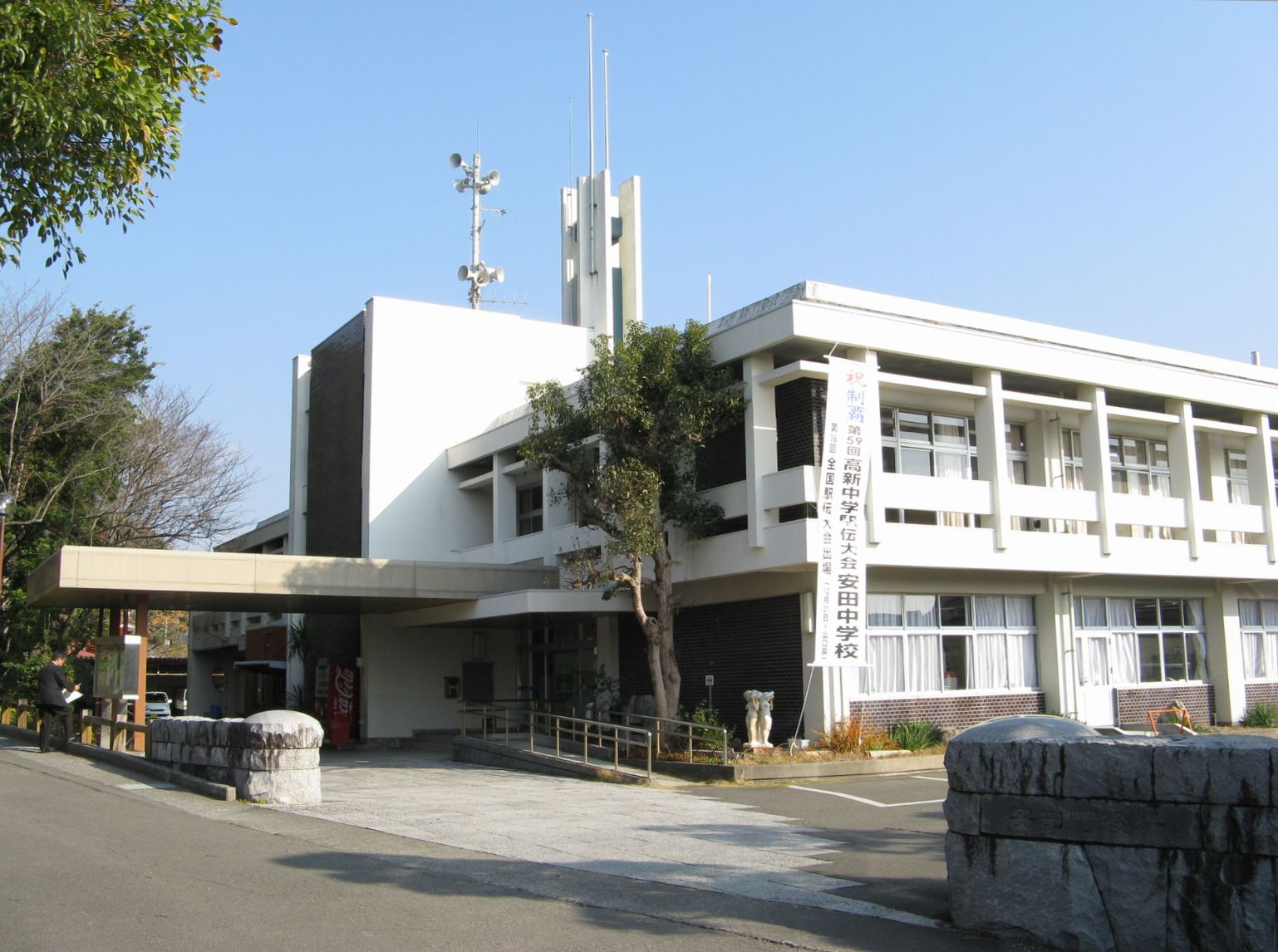
- Yasuda town hall

- Flag Chapter
- Location of Yasuda in Kōchi Prefecture

- Location in Japan
- Coordinates: 33°26′18.8″N 133°58′51.9″E
- Country: Japan
- Region: Shikoku
- Prefecture: Kōchi
- District: Aki

Area
  - Total: 52.36 km^{2} (20.22 sq mi)

Population (July 31, 2022)
  - Total: 2,455
  - Density: 46.89/km^{2} (121.4/sq mi)
- Time zone: UTC+09:00 (JST)
- City hall address: 1850 Yasuda, Yasuda-chō, Aki-gun, Kochi-ken 781-6421
- Website: Official website
- Symbols
- Bird: Japanese bush warbler
- Fish: Ayu
- Flower: Crinum
- Tree: Cinnamomum camphora

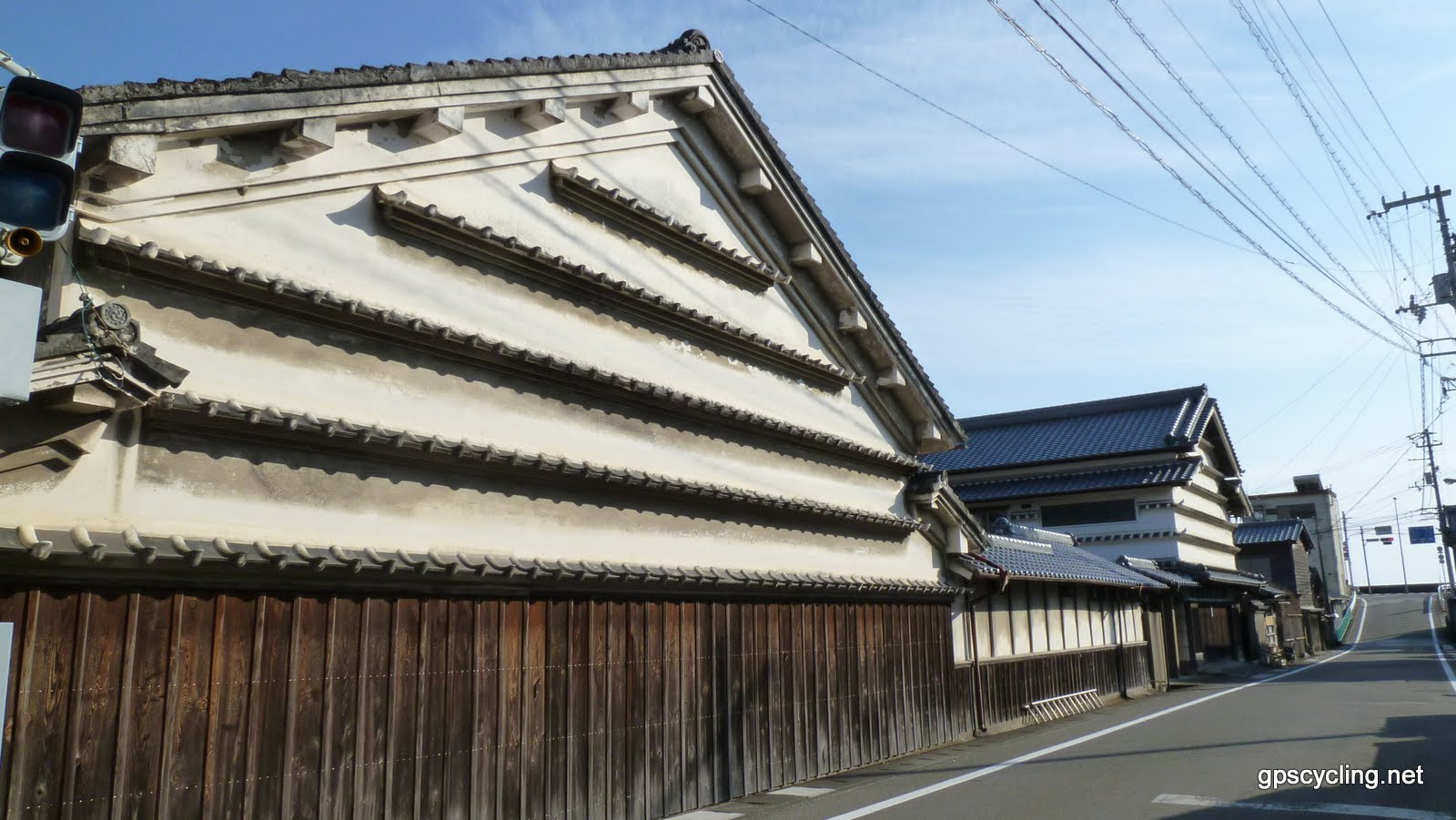
traditional buildings in Yasuda

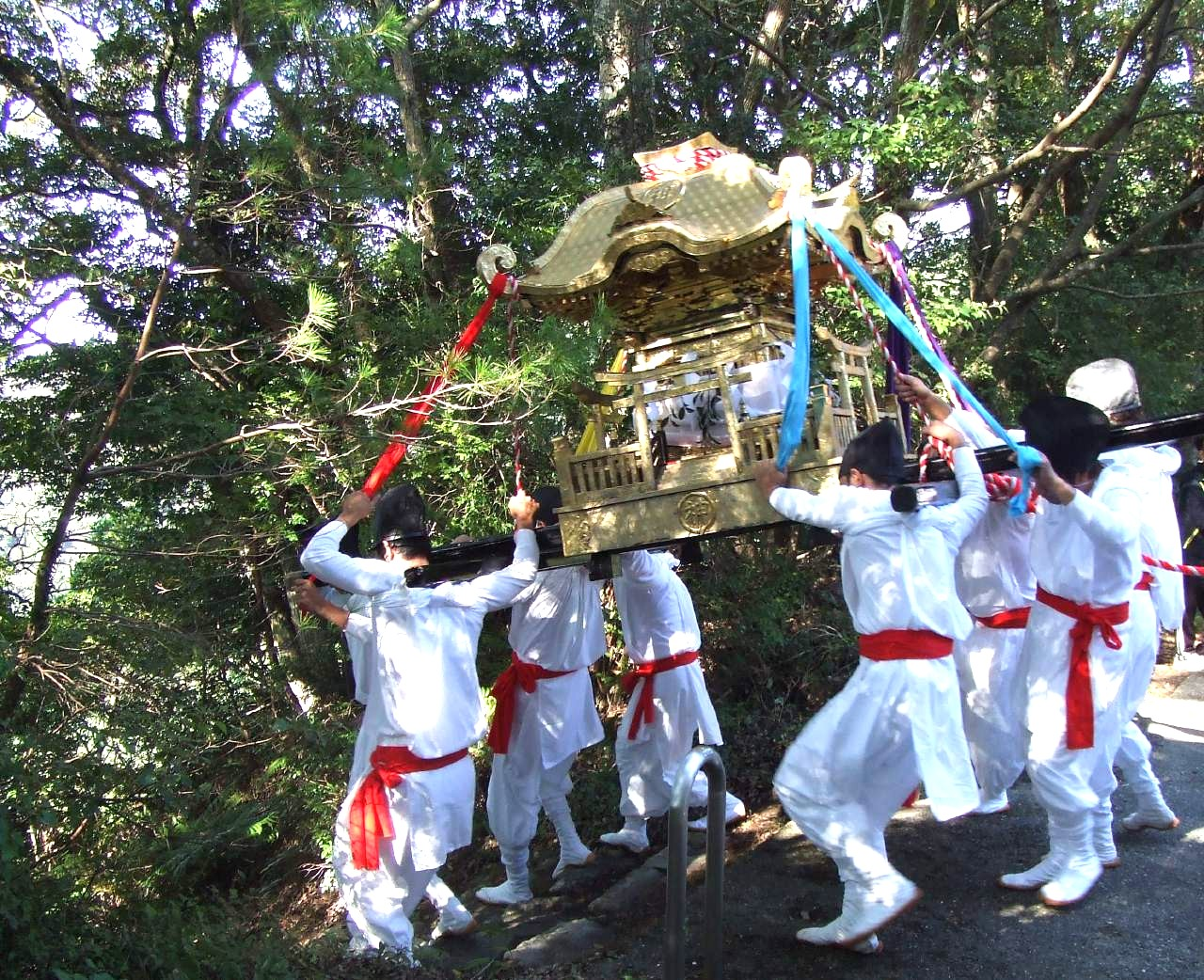
Kōnomine Jinja autumn festival

Yasuda (安田町, Yasuda-chō) is a town located in Aki District, Kōchi Prefecture, Japan. As of 31 July 2022, the town had an estimated population of 2,455 in 1244 households and a population density of 47 persons per km^{2}. The total area of the town is 52.36 square kilometres (20.22 sq mi).

== Geography ==
Yasuda is located in southeastern Kōchi Prefecture on the island of Shikoku. The town area is generally along the valley in the middle and lower reaches of the Yasuda River, and extends back to Umaji Village. It faces Tosa Bay in the south. Forests occupy about 80% of the town.

=== Neighbouring municipalities ===
Kōchi Prefecture

- Aki
- Kitagawa
- Tano
- Umaji

=== Climate ===
Yasuda has a humid subtropical climate (Köppen Cfa) characterized by warm summers and cool winters with light snowfall.

== Demographics ==
Per Japanese census data, the population of Yasuda has been decreased steadily since the 1960s.

Historical population
Year	Pop.	±%
1920	5,594	—
1930	5,583	−0.2%
1940	5,476	−1.9%
1950	6,933	+26.6%
1960	6,141	−11.4%
1970	5,031	−18.1%
1980	4,428	−12.0%
1990	4,055	−8.4%
2000	3,535	−12.8%
2010	2,970	−16.0%
2020	2,370	−20.2%

== History ==
As with all of Kōchi Prefecture, the area of Yasuda was part of ancient Tosa Province. The name of Aki District appears in Nara period . During the Edo period, the area was part of the holdings of Tosa Domain ruled by the Yamauchi clan from their seat at Kōchi Castle. The village of Yasuda was established with the creation of the modern municipalities system on October 1, 1889. It was raised to town status on February 11, 1925.

== Government ==
Yasuda has a mayor-council form of government with a directly elected mayor and a unicameral town council of five members. Yasuda, together with the other municipalities of Aki District, contributes one member to the Kōchi Prefectural Assembly. In terms of national politics, the town is part of Kōchi 1st district of the lower house of the Diet of Japan.

== Economy ==
Yasuda's economy is centered on Polytunnel agriculture and commercial fishing, notable for Ayu, for which the town is famous. There are two local sake brewers located in Yasuda: Minami Shuzou (Tamanoi 玉の井) and Tosatsuru (土佐鶴).

== Education ==
Yasuda has one public elementary school and one public middle school operated by the town government. The town does not have a high school.

== Transportation ==
=== Railway ===
Tosa Kuroshio Railway - Asa Line

- Tonohama - Yasuda

=== Highway ===
- National Route 55

== Sister cities ==
- Montefrío, Spain, sister city since February 2018

== Local attractions ==
- Kōnomine-ji, 24th temple on the Shikoku Pilgrimage
- Kōnomine Jinja
