= Tano, Kōchi =

Town in Shikoku, Japan

Tano 田野町
- Tano
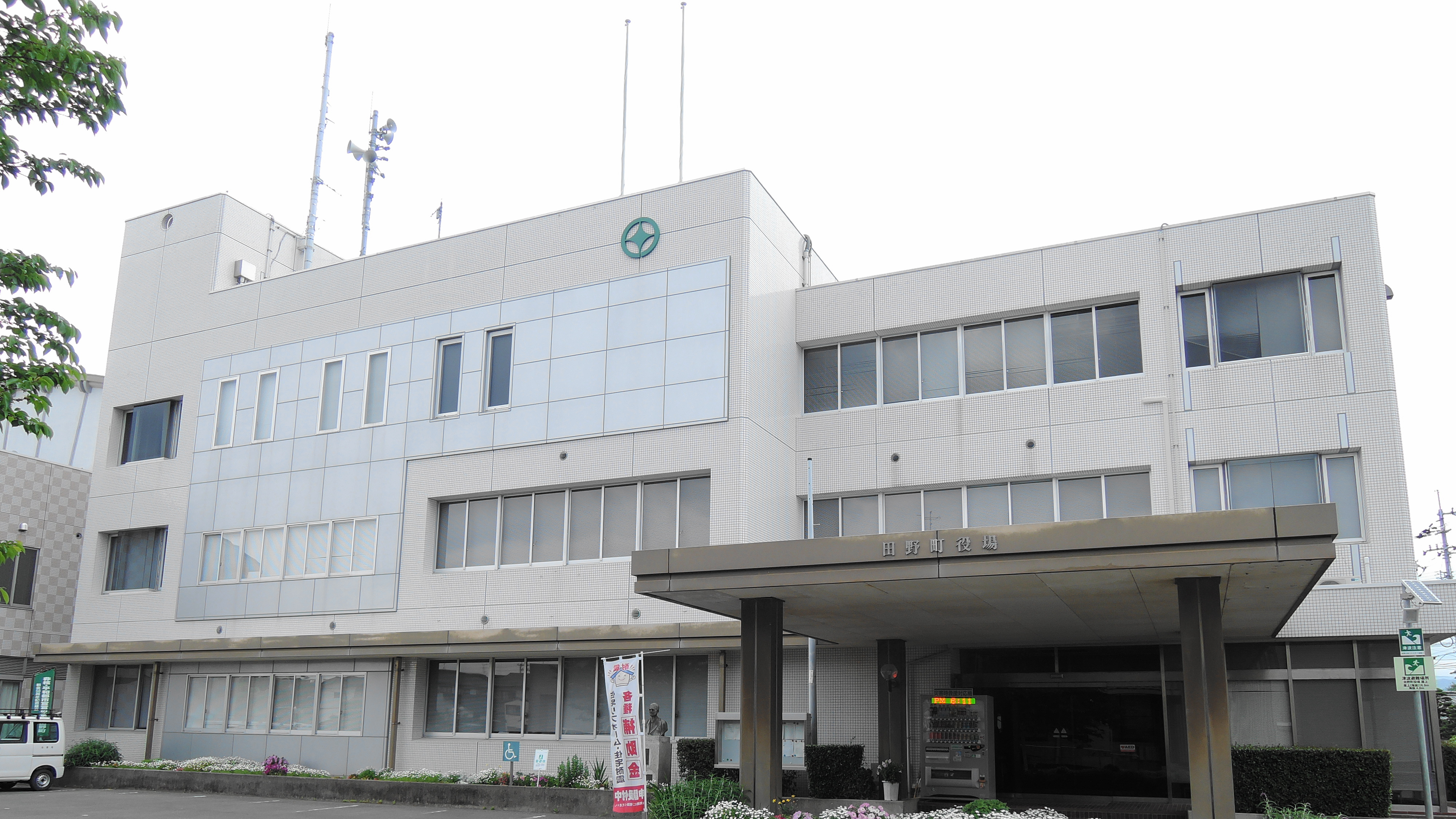
- Tano town hall

- Flag Seal
- Location of Tano in Kōchi Prefecture

- Location in Japan
- Coordinates: 33°26′N 134°1′E
- Country: Japan
- Region: Shikoku
- Prefecture: Kōchi
- District: Aki

Area
  - Total: 6.53 km^{2} (2.52 sq mi)

Population (July 31, 2022)
  - Total: 2,530
  - Density: 391/km^{2} (1,010/sq mi)
- Time zone: UTC+09:00 (JST)
- City hall address: 1828-5, Tano-chō, Aki-gun, Kōchi-ken 781-6410
- Website: Official website
- Symbols
- Bird: Japanese white-eye
- Flower: Sakura
- Tree: Yanase Sugi

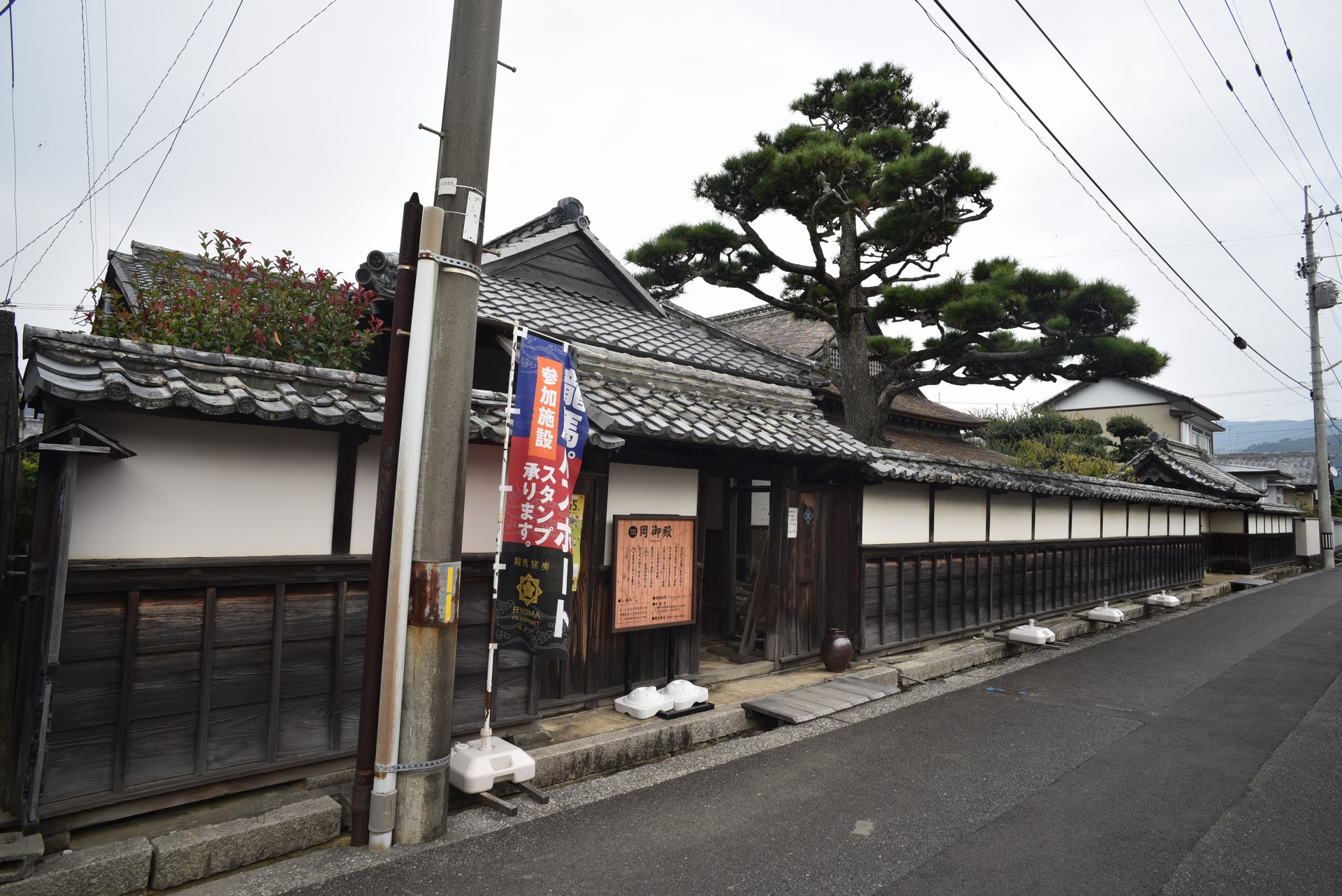
Oka Goten

Tano (田野町, Tano-chō) is a town located in Aki District, Kōchi Prefecture, Japan. As of 31 July 2022, the town had an estimated population of 2,530 in 1309 households and a population density of 391 persons per km^{2}. The total area of the town is 6.53 square kilometres (2.52 sq mi). Over 1000 of the residents are over the age of 65. Tano is the smallest town by area on the island of Shikoku, and it is second in population density in Kōchi Prefecture, following Kōchi City.

== Geography ==
Tano is located in southeastern Kōchi Prefecture on the island of Shikoku, with a coastline the Pacific Ocean to the south.

=== Neighbouring municipalities ===
Kōchi Prefecture

- Kitagawa
- Nahari
- Yasuda

=== Climate ===
Tano has a humid subtropical climate (Köppen Cfa) characterized by warm summers and cool winters with light snowfall.

== Demographics ==
Per Japanese census data, the population of Tano has decreased steadily since the 1960s, and is now less than it was a century ago.

Historical population
Year	Pop.	±%
1920	3,247	—
1930	3,550	+9.3%
1940	3,526	−0.7%
1950	4,892	+38.7%
1960	5,124	+4.7%
1970	4,323	−15.6%
1980	4,149	−4.0%
1990	2,682	−35.4%
2000	3,315	+23.6%
2010	2,932	−11.6%
2020	2,468	−15.8%

== History ==
As with all of Kōchi Prefecture, the area of Tano was part of ancient Tosa Province. The name of Aki District appears in Nara period . During the Heian period, Takada Hokkyo, a noble of the imperial court established a shōen landed estate at Tano. During the Edo period, the area was part of the holdings of Tosa Domain ruled by the Yamauchi clan from their seat at Kōchi Castle. The area was part of a maritime transportation hub, especially for the shipment of lumber, which was a major revenue source for Tosa Domain. During the Bakumatsu period, 23 samurai were executed on September 5, 1864, on the bank of the Nahari River for petitioning for the release of Takechi Hanpeita.The village of Tano was established with the creation of the modern municipalities system on October 1, 1889. It was raised to town status on May 1, 1920.

== Government ==
Tano has a mayor-council form of government with a directly elected mayor and a unicameral town council of eight members. Tano, together with the other municipalities of Aki District, contributes one member to the Kōchi Prefectural Assembly. In terms of national politics, the town is part of Kōchi 1st district of the lower house of the Diet of Japan.

== Economy ==
Tano's economy is centered on commercial fishing, agriculture, and small-scale food processing.

== Education ==
Tano has one public elementary school and one public middle school operated by the town government and one public high school operated by the Kōchi Prefectural Board of Education.

== Transportation ==
=== Railway ===
Tosa Kuroshio Railway - Asa Line

- Tano

=== Highways ===
- National Route 55

== Local attractions ==
- Former Residence of Osachi Hamaguchi
  Former residence of the 17th Prime Minister of Japan.
- Grave of the Twenty-Three Samurai
  The gravesite of the Twenty-Three samurai two supported Takechi Hanpeita and the Tosa Kinnō-tō (Tosa Imperial Loyalist Party)
- Hachiman Shrine and Overpass Road
  A Hachiman shrine that was established during the 7th year of the Kan'ei era (1631), and utilizes an overpass bridge that was part of the Yanase railroad as the shrines entranceway.
- Oka Palace Residence
  The former residence of the Oka family, the wealthiest of a group of merchants in Tano that specialized in trade and transport throughout the Chugei region.
- Tano Cho Total Sun Dried Salt Making Experience Facility
  A salt making facility that uses only solar and wind power to create salt, including salt that is infused with various ingredients to make specialty flavors.
- Tateoka No. 2 Plank Road
  Remains of a plank road that was used to transport lumber via the Yanase railroad, which is part of a series of railroad remains throughout the Chugei region.
