= Nahari Station =

Railway station in Nahari, Kōchi Prefecture, Japan

Nahari Station 奈半利駅
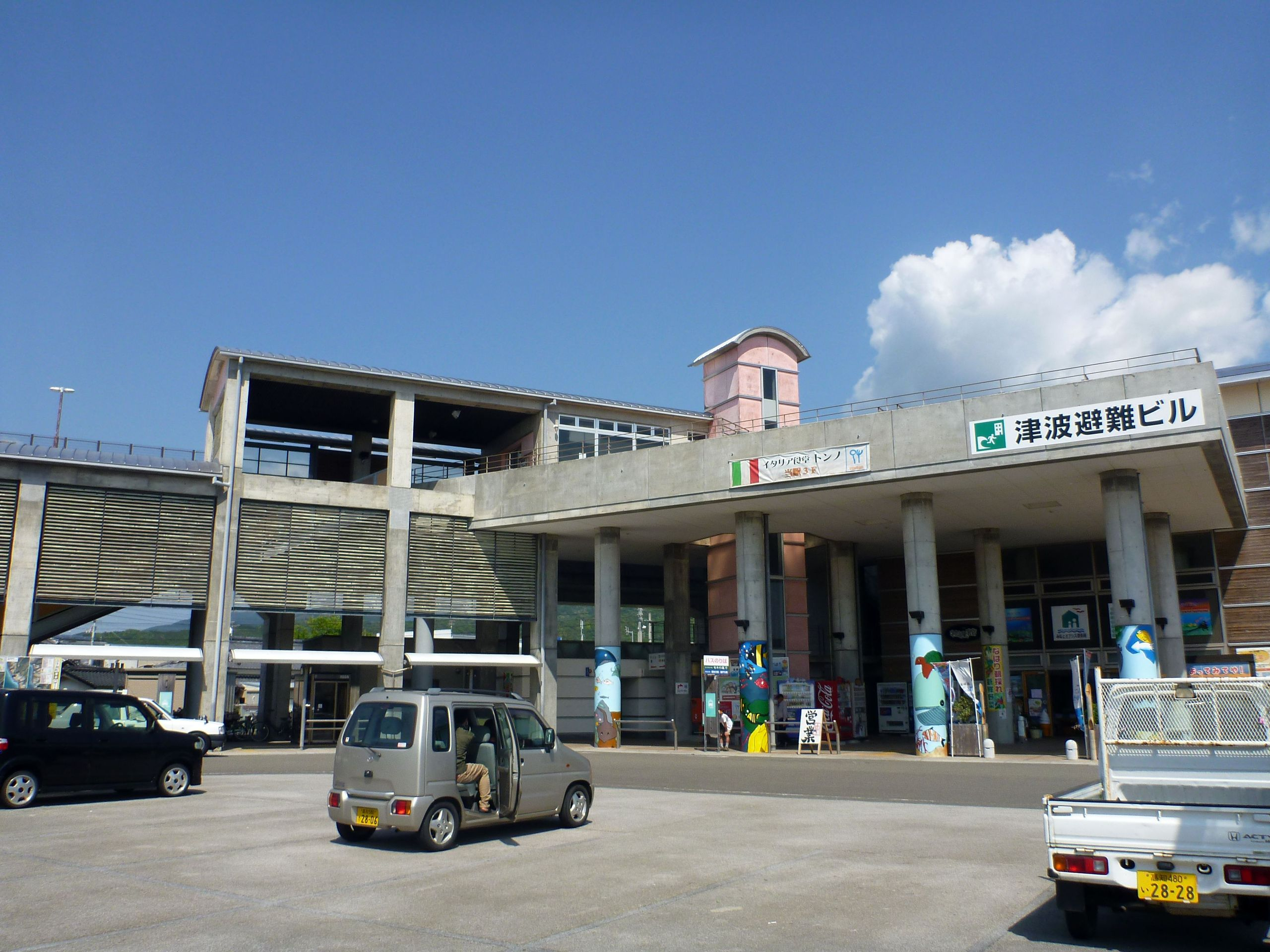
- Nahari Station in 2015

General information
- Location: Otsu, Nahari-cho, Aki-gun, Kōchi-ken 781-6402; Japan
- Coordinates: 33°25′31″N 134°01′06″E
- Operator: Tosa Kuroshio Railway
- Line: ■ Asa Line
- Distance: 42.7 km from Gomen
- Platforms: 1 side platform
- Tracks: 1

Construction
- Structure type: Elevated
- Parking: Available
- Cycle facilities: Bike shed, bike rentals
- Accessible: Yes - elevator to platform

Other information
- Status: Staffed ticket window
- Station code: GN21
- Website: Official website

History
- Opened: 1 July 2002

Passengers
- FY2011: 358 daily
Location
- Location within Kochi Prefecture Location within Japan

Nahari Station (奈半利駅, Nahari-eki) is a passenger railway station located in the town of Nahari, Aki District, Kōchi Prefecture, Japan. It is operated by the third-sector Tosa Kuroshio Railway with the station number "GN21".

== Lines ==
The station is served by the Asa Line and is located 42.7 km from the beginning of the line at Gomen. It is the eastern terminus for the Asa Line and all trains, both rapid and local, stop and turn back at the station.

== Layout ==
The station consists of a side platform serving a single elevated track. The station building built into the elevated structure houses a waiting area, a restaurant and a ticket window. Access to the platform is by a flight of steps or an elevator. There is a designated parking area for bicycles under the elevated structure and bike rentals are available from the station. Parking for cars is available at the station forecourt. The station building is also a designated tsunami evacuation area.

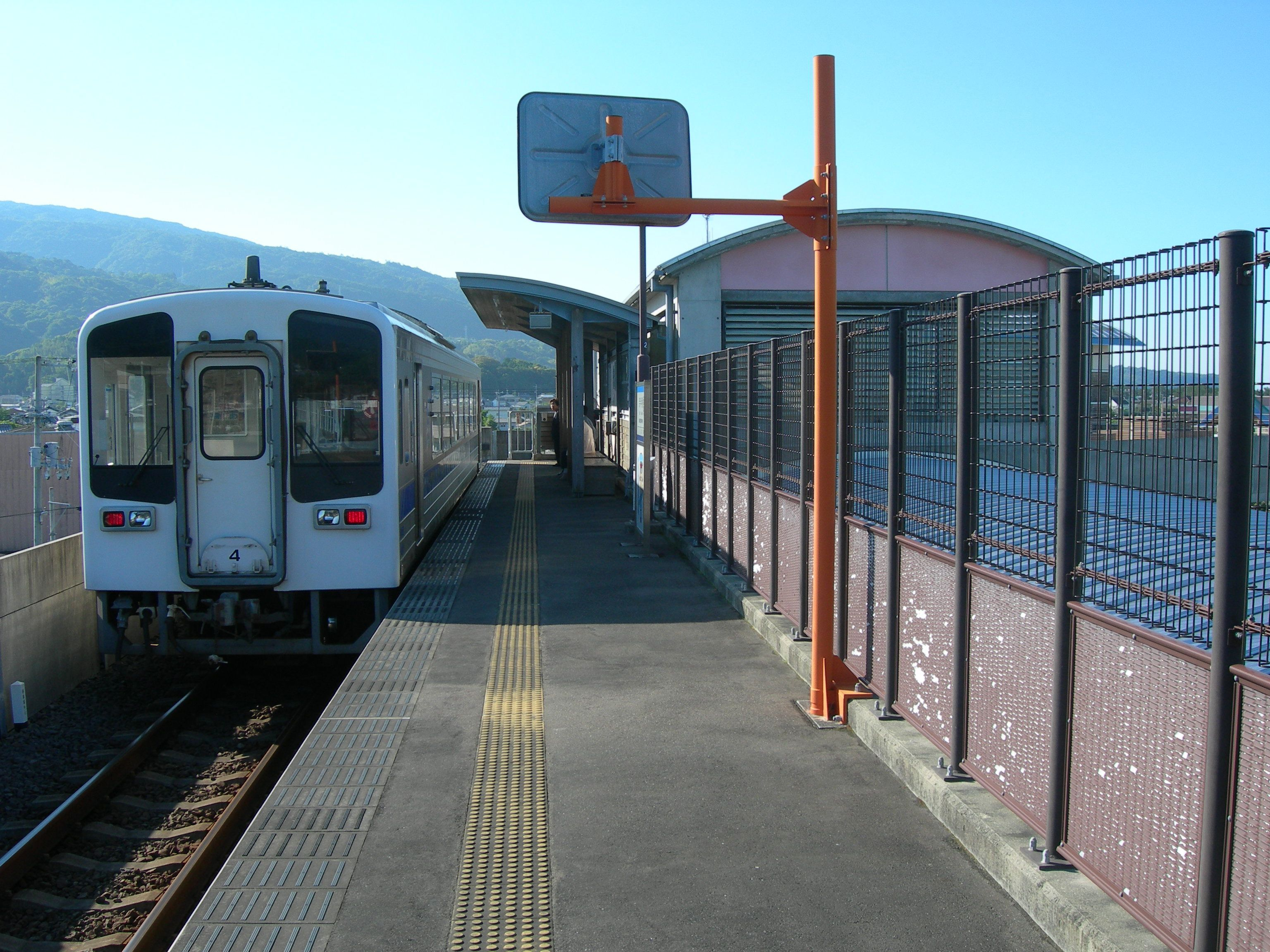
A view of the station platform and tracks.

== Adjacent stations ==
«	Service	»
Asa Line
Tano	Rapid	Terminus
Tano	Local	Terminus

== Station mascot ==
Each station on the Asa Line features a cartoon mascot character designed by Takashi Yanase, a local cartoonist from Kōchi Prefecture. The mascot for Nahari Station is a girl in a station master's uniform named Nahariko-chan (なはりこちゃん).

== History ==
The train station was opened on 1 July 2002 by the Tosa Kuroshio Railway as the eastern terminus of its track from Gomen.

== Passenger statistics ==
In fiscal 2011, the station was used by an average of 358 passengers daily.

== Surrounding area ==
- Nahari Town Office
- Nahari Town Health Center
- Nahari Municipal Nahari Elementary School
- Nahari Town Nahari Junior High School

== See also ==
- List of railway stations in Japan
