= Tosa Shrine =

Shinto shrine in Kochi, Kochi, Japan

Tosa Jinja 土佐神社
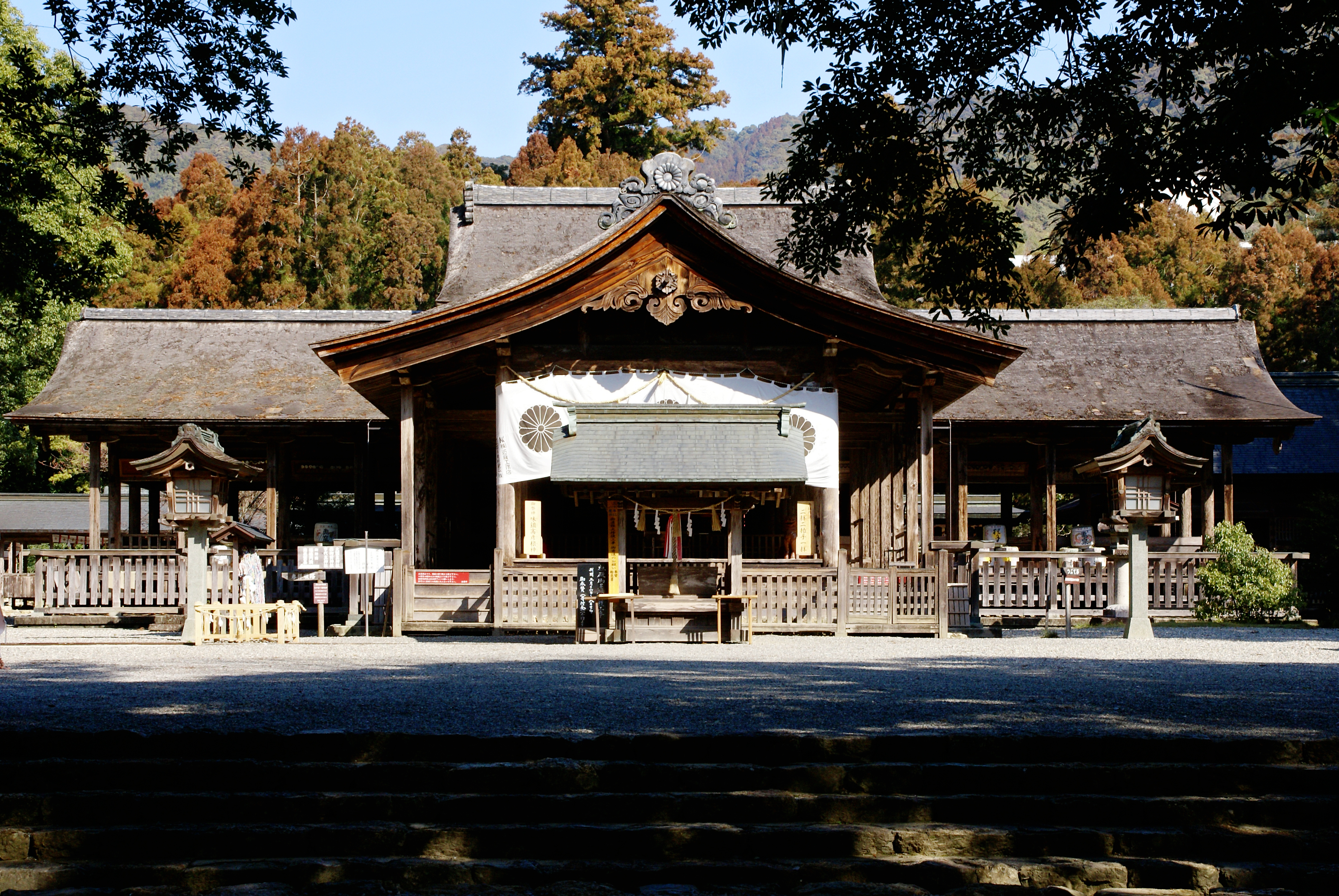
- Haiden of Tosa Jinja

- Tosa Jinja Tosa Shrine (Japan)

Religion
- Affiliation: Shinto
- Deity: Ajisukitakahikone and Hitokotonushu no kami
- Festival: March 11–13

Location
- Location: 16-1 Ikkushinane 2-chōme, Kōchi-shi, Kōchi-ken 781-8131
- Interactive map of Tosa Jinja 土佐神社
- Coordinates: 33°35′33.44″N 133°34′37.25″E

Architecture
- Established: unknown

Website
- Official website

Tosa jinja (土佐神社) is a Shinto shrine located in the Ichinomiya-shinane neighborhood in the northeastern part of the city of Kochi, Japan. It is the ichinomiya of the former Tosa Province. The shrine's main festival is held annually from March 11–13. Several of the shrine structures are designated National Important Cultural Properties. The shrine's Shinane Festival, held on August 25, is known as one of the three major festivals of Kochi.

== Enshrined kami ==
The kami enshrined at Tosa Jinja are:

- Ajisukitakahikone (味鋤高彦根神), the son of Ōkuninushi and ancestor of the Kano clan, the kuni no miyatsuko of Tosa Province; also called Kano Omikami
- Hitokotonushu no kami (一言主神), who appears in the Kojiki and Nihon Shoki in the section of Emperor Yuryaku as an oracle god from Mount Yamato Katsuragi

== History ==
It is not known when the Tosa Shrine was founded. Per the shrine's legend (as recounted in the late Kamakura period Shaku Nihongi) when Emperor Yuryaku was hunting near Mount Yamato Katsuragi in Yamato Province, he encountered Hitokoto-no-nushi no kami, but due to his irreverent behavior the Emperor had him exiled to Tosa Province. The exiled deity was first enshrined at a place called 'Kamonochi' where the locals worshipped a god called "Kano Omikami" and was later transferred to the present location. There are various candidates vying for the location of this first shrine, including the Kano Jinja in the town of Kuroshio, Kano Jinja in Susaki and Narunashi Jinja in Susaki. The exact location of the Tosa Kokufu is also uncertain; however, the area around the shrine has many late Kofun period (6th century to 7th century) burial mounds and per the "Tosa no Kuni Fudoki", there was a government administrative complex located some two kilometers east of the Tosa Shrine.

The first historical record of Tosa Shrine is found in "Nihon Shoki" in an entry dated to the 4th year of Emperor Tenmu (675), which details the submission of the local Tsuchisa no Ōkami Hosai clan to the Imperial Court. In addition, an entry of August in 686 mentions the dispatch of offerings from the Imperial Court to Tsuchiza no Ōkami following the Hakuho Earthquake of 684, and response to Emperor Tenmu's deteriorating physical condition from June 686. In the "Shinsho Kakuchokufusho" of 765, 20 of the 53 shrines added to 'Takakamo no kami' were found in Tosa Province, suggesting a relationship with the Kamo clan in Kyoto. The Tosa Shrine was promoted to the highest rank in 940 AD due to successful prayers for the suppression of the Fujiwara no Sumitomo rebellion.

In the Engishiki records, the shrine was named as a Myōjin-taisha, the only such shrine in Tosa Province. Per the "Hyakurensho" records of 1224, the shrine was completely destroyed by a typhoon. The shrine is first named as the ichinomiya of they province in 1326 in an account of a battle between forces of the Northern and Southern Courts which occurred in the vicinity. It is believed that a shōen manor called Ichinomiya-shō was formed around the shrine during the Kamakura period, and that the priests of the shrine became secularized samurai in the Muromachi period under the name of the "Ichinomiya clan". The shrine was destroyed again around 1509 in the wars of the early Sengoku period, and was reconstructed by Chōsokabe Motochika, with the current Honden, Heiden and Haiden of the shrine completed in 1571. Various vassals of the Chōsokabe were assigned to reconstruct lesser structures and several villages in the vicinity of the shrine were assigned to the shrine for its upkeep. During the Edo Period, the Yamauchi clan who ruled as daimyō of Tosa Domain, further constructed to the shrine, with the second daimyō, Yamauchi Tadayoshi, contributing the Rōmon tower gate in 1631 and a drum tower in 1649.

Following the Meiji restoration, the shrine was renamed Tosa Jinja in 1871 and it was designated a National Shrine, 2nd rank (国幣中社, Kokuhei-chusha) under the Modern system of ranked Shinto shrines. After World War II, it was redesignated a Beppyo Shrine under the Jinja Honchō. In 2003, an archaeological excavation on the west side of the precincts found the foundations of the medieval mansion and other structures related to temples and shrines.

== Cultural Properties ==
=== National Important Cultural Properties ===
- Honden (本殿), Muromachi period (1571); built by Chōsokabe Motochika. It is a five by four bay structure with a gabled and thatched roof. The exterior is painted in rich colors and carved everywhere, and the interior is divided into inner and outer sanctuaries.
- Heiden (幣殿) and Haiden (拝殿), Muromachi period (1571); also built by Chōsokabe Motochika. The buildings are arranged so as to represent the shape of a dragonfly flying into the main shrine, and this layout unique to Tosa Shrine. It is said to symbolize a triumphant return from battle.
- Drum Tower (鼓楼; Korō), early Edo Period (1649); located southeast of the Heiden. Built by Yamauchi Tadayoshi. It is a two-story structure with a gabled and thatched roof. The upper floor has carvings and pillars painted with colors, and a drum is hung inside to tell the time.
- Rōmon (楼門), early Edo Period (1631); also known as the 'Shinkomon,' It was built by Yamauchi Tadayoshi. It is a two-storied gate with three girder rows and two spans between beams (a two-storied gate with no eaves between the first and upper floors), and the roof is gabled and covered with copper. The first floor enshrines they Zuijin between the left and right sides. The upper floor is surrounded by balustrades. The whole building is made of bare wood with almost no decoration.
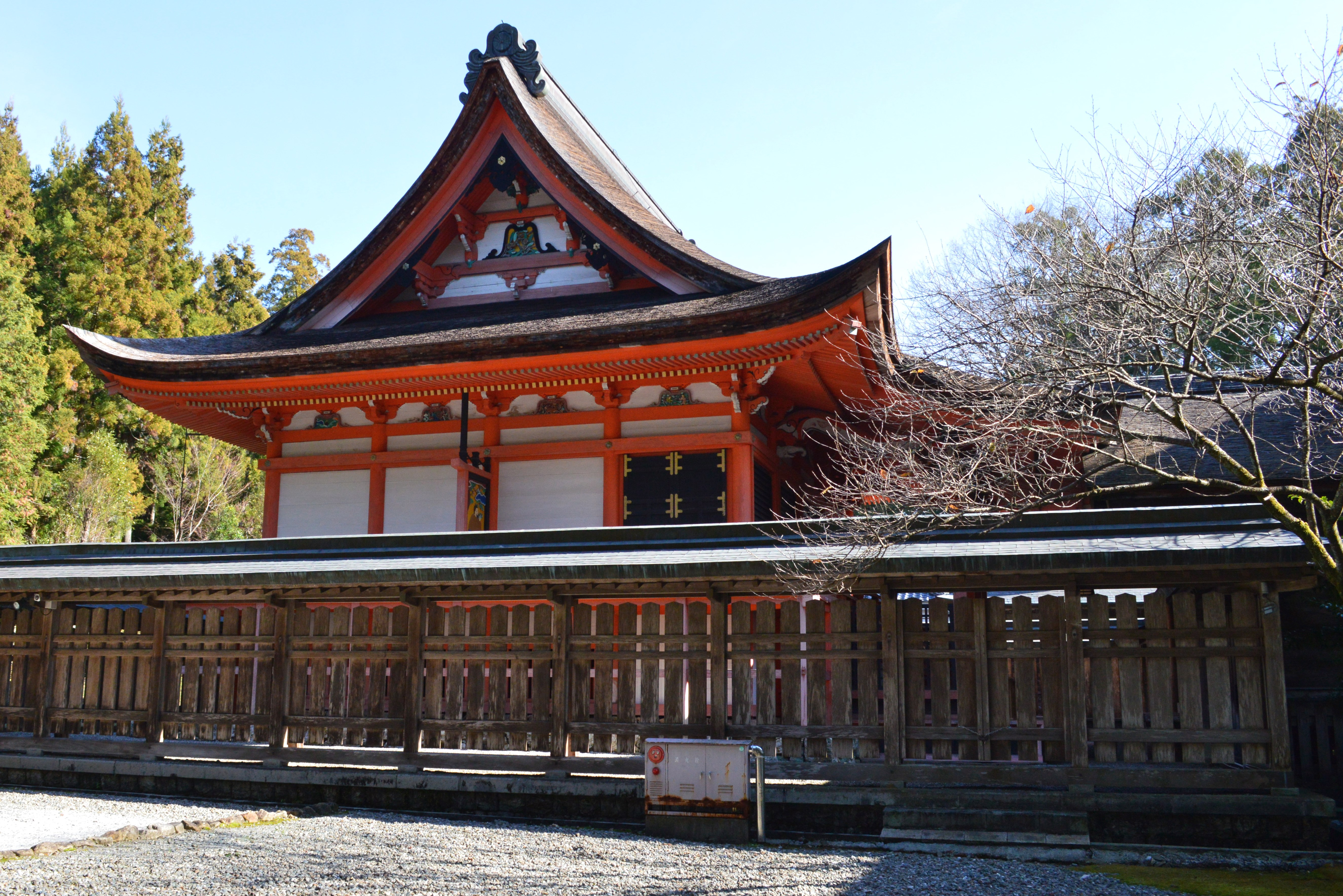
Honden

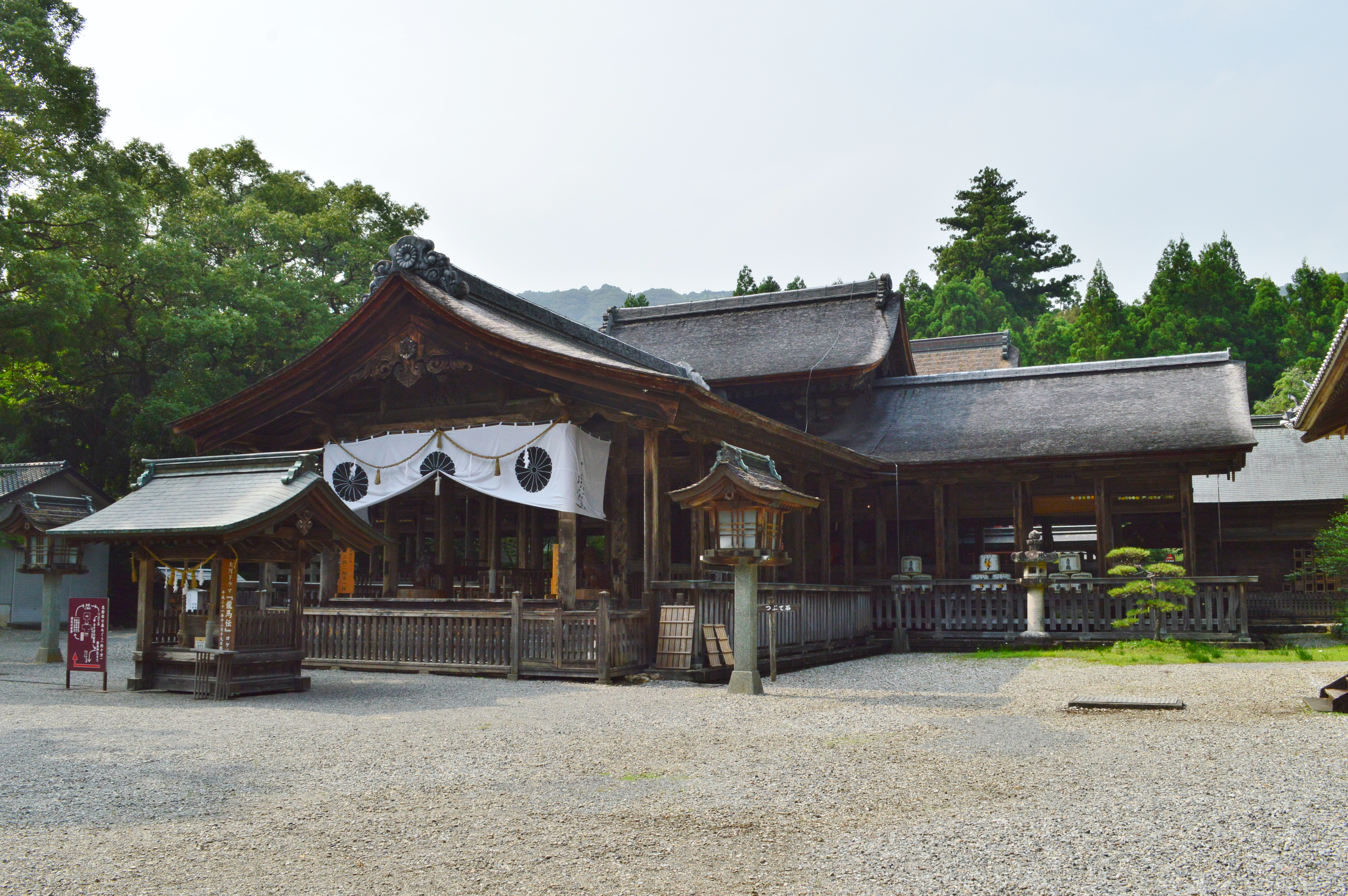
Haiden

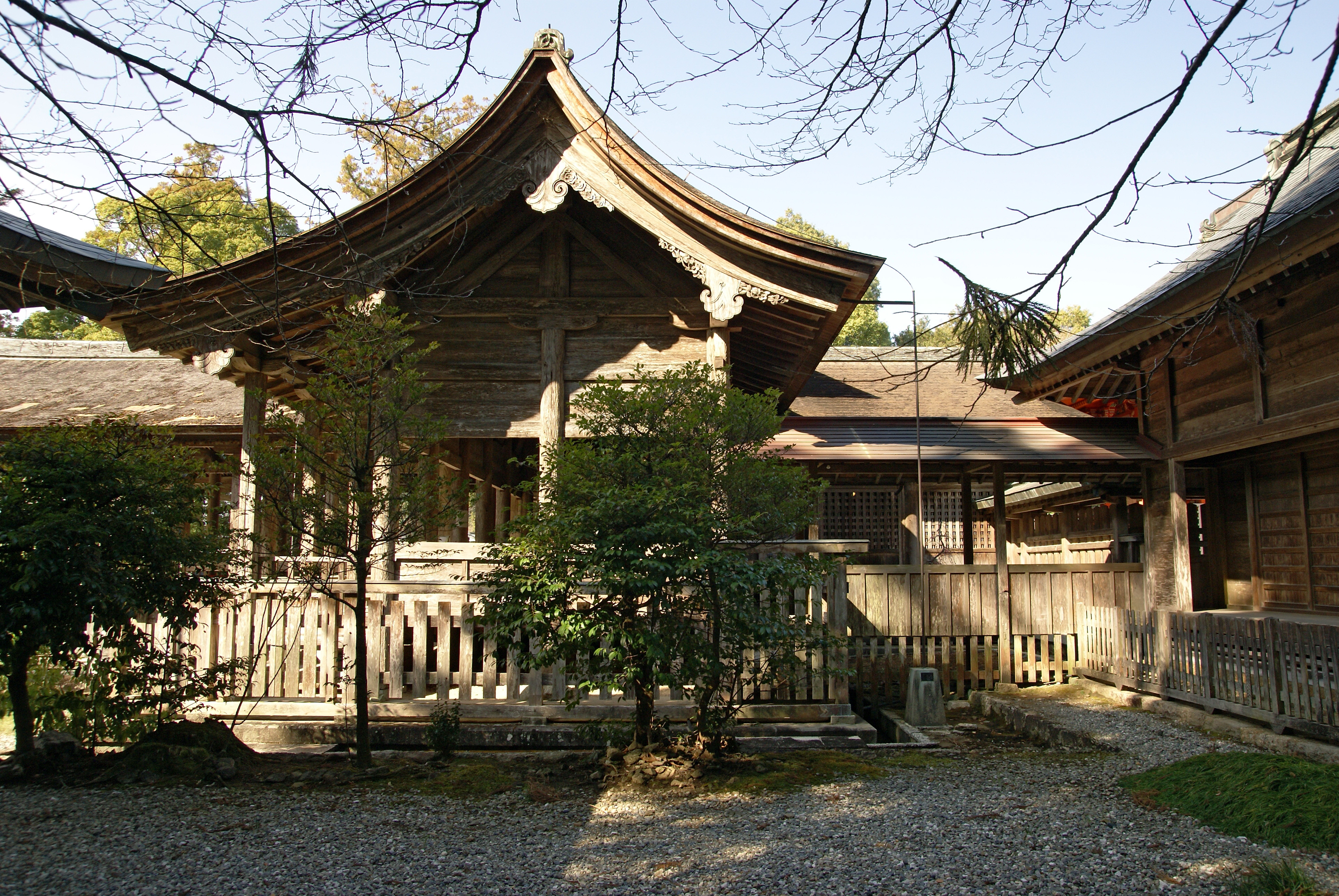
Heiden

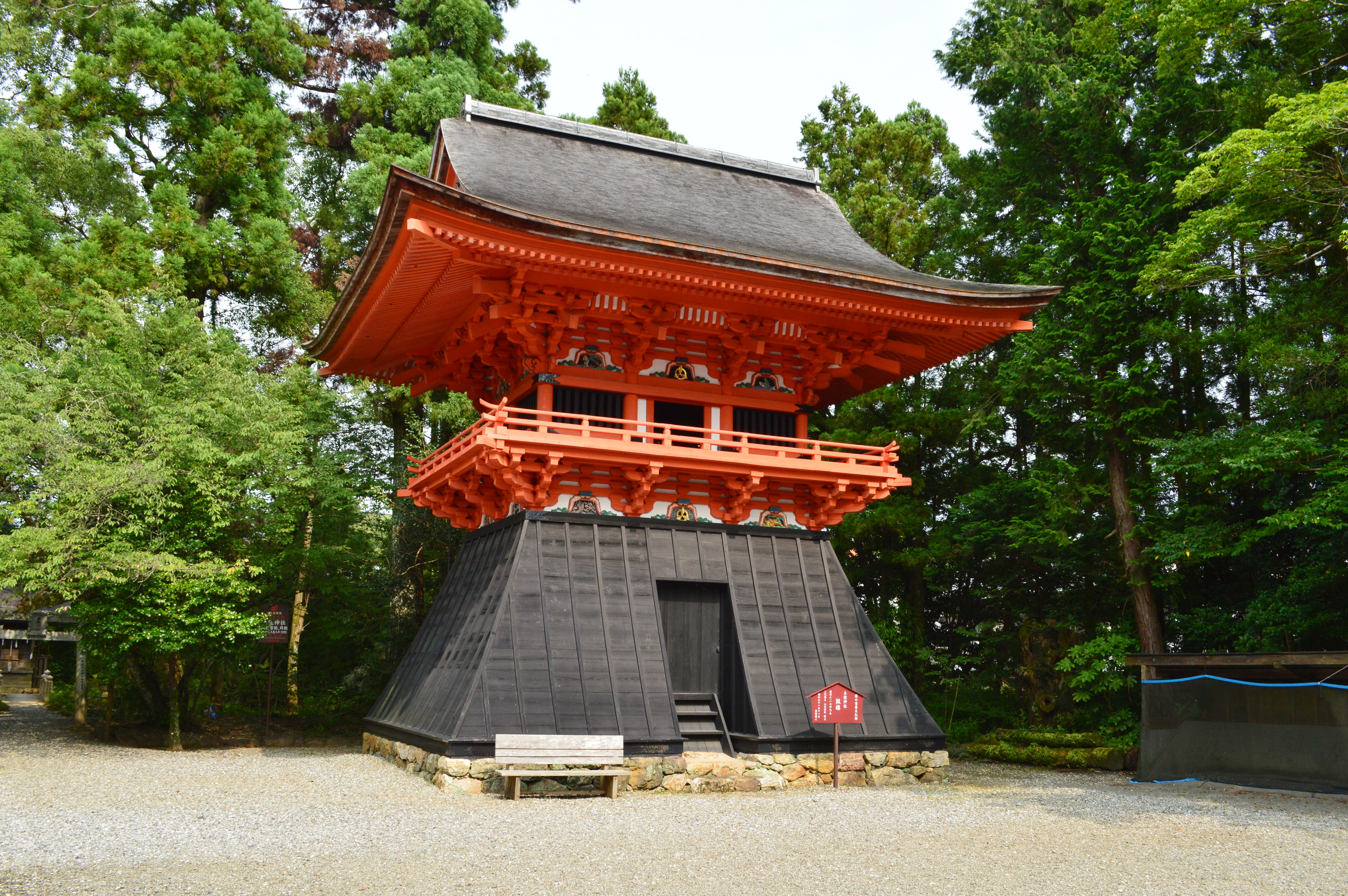
Drum Tower

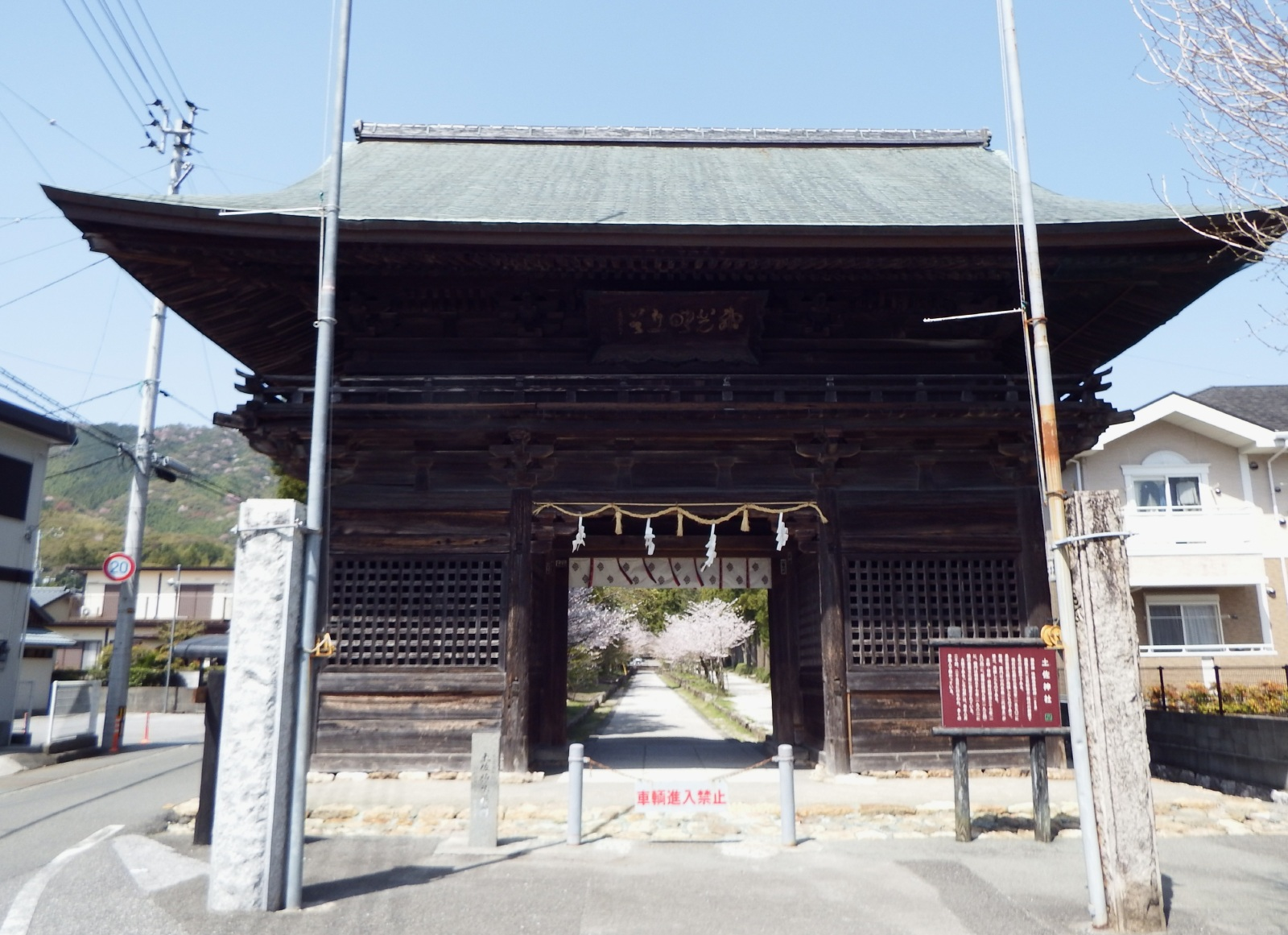
Romon

== See also ==
- List of Shinto shrines
- Ichinomiya
