= Kōnomine-ji =

Buddhist temple in Kōchi Prefecture, Japan

- 神峯寺
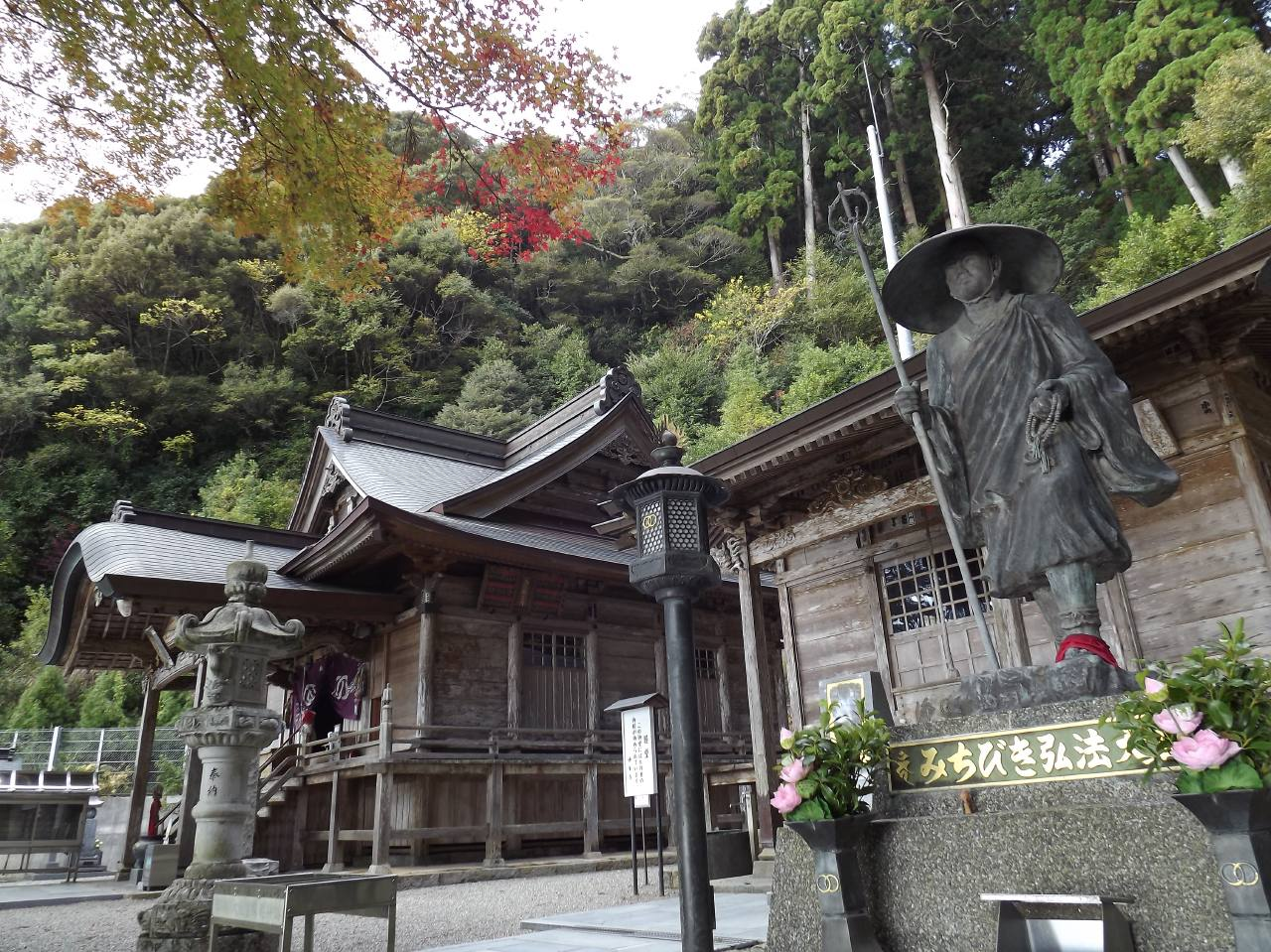

Religion
- Affiliation: Shingon

Location
- Location: Kōchi-ken
- Country: Japan
- Interactive map of Kōnomine-ji
- Coordinates: 33°28′04″N 133°58′29″E

Website
- http://www.88shikokuhenro.jp/27kounomineji/

Kōnomine-ji is a Shingon Buddhist Temple located in Yasuda, Kōchi, Japan. It is the 27th temple of the Shikoku Pilgrimage.
