= Aki District, Kōchi =

District in Kōchi Prefecture, Japan

Coordinates: 33.537612°N 134.091542°E

Aki (安芸郡, Aki-gun) is a district located in Kōchi Prefecture, Japan.

As of December 2014, the district has an estimated population of 17,538 and a density of 31.1 persons per km^{2}. The total area is 563.33 km^{2}.

Aki is known as the birthplace of Iwasaki Yatarō, the founder of the modern day Mitsubishi conglomerate.

== Towns and villages ==
- Nahari
- Tano
- Tōyō
- Yasuda
- Geisei
- Kitagawa
- Umaji
