= Kōchi Castle =

Castle in Kōchi, Japan

- 高知城
- 1-2-1 Marunouchi, Kōchi-shi, Kōchi-ken, Japan
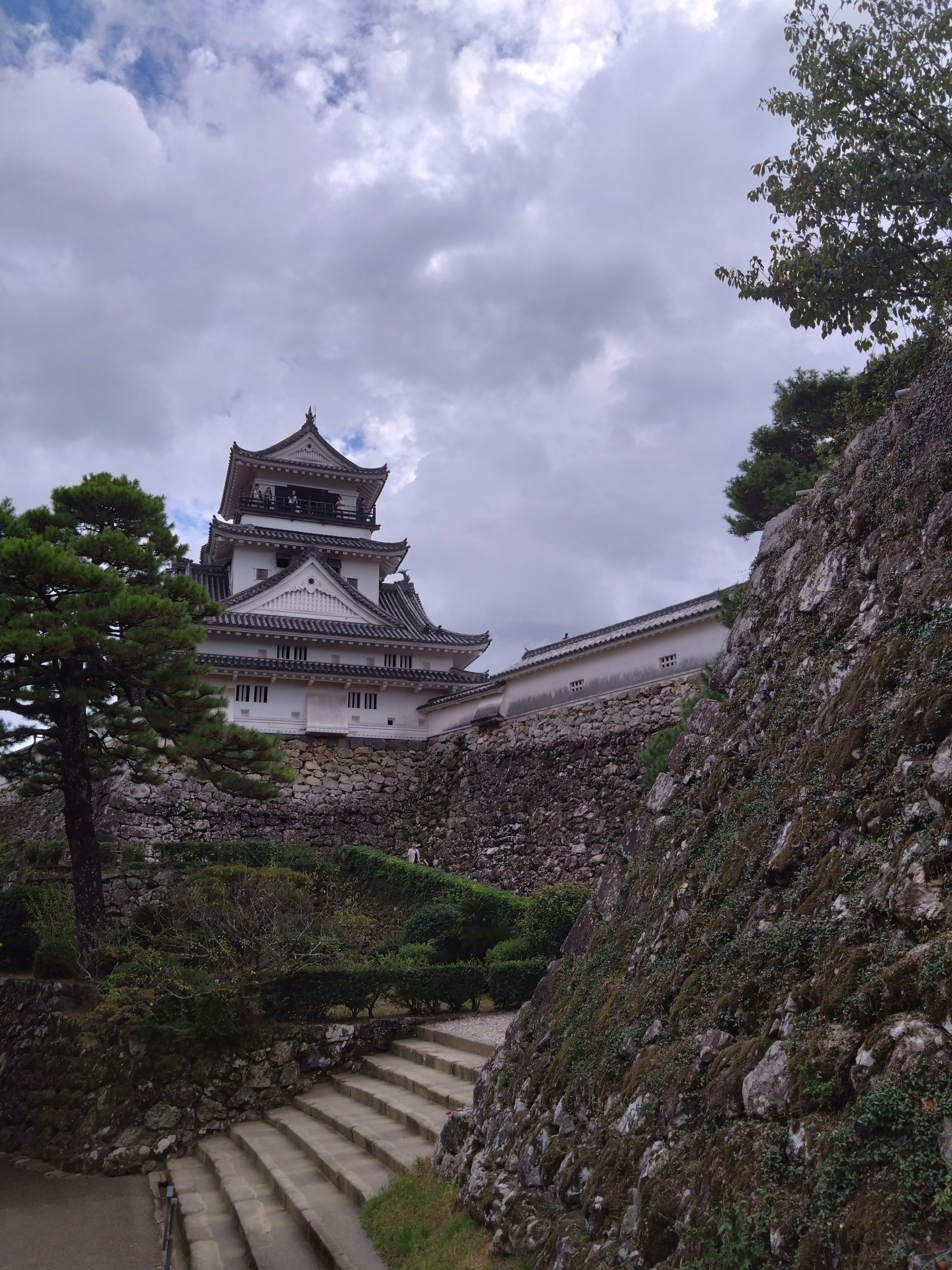

Site information
- Type: Hirayamashiro (hilltop castle)
- Condition: All the buildings in the honmaru (innermost bailey) are original, dating from 1729 to 1753.

Location
- Location within Kochi Prefecture Location within Japan
- Coordinates: 33°33′40″N 133°31′53″E
- Height: Five stories (tenshu)

Site history
- Built: 1601 to 1611
- Built by: Yamanouchi Kazutoyo
- In use: 1611 to 1868
- Materials: Earth, stone, and wood

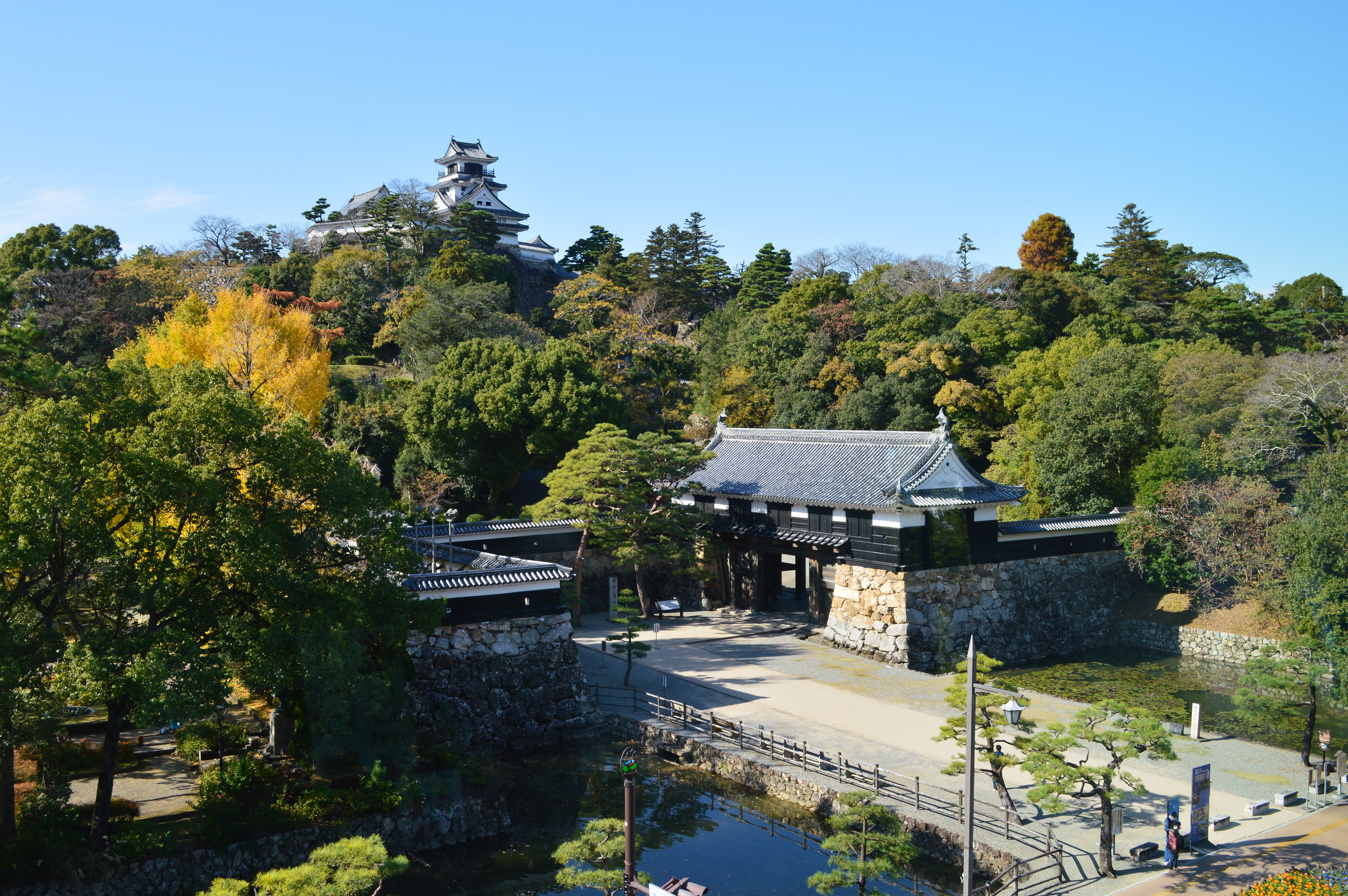
The Ōtemon of Kōchi Castle

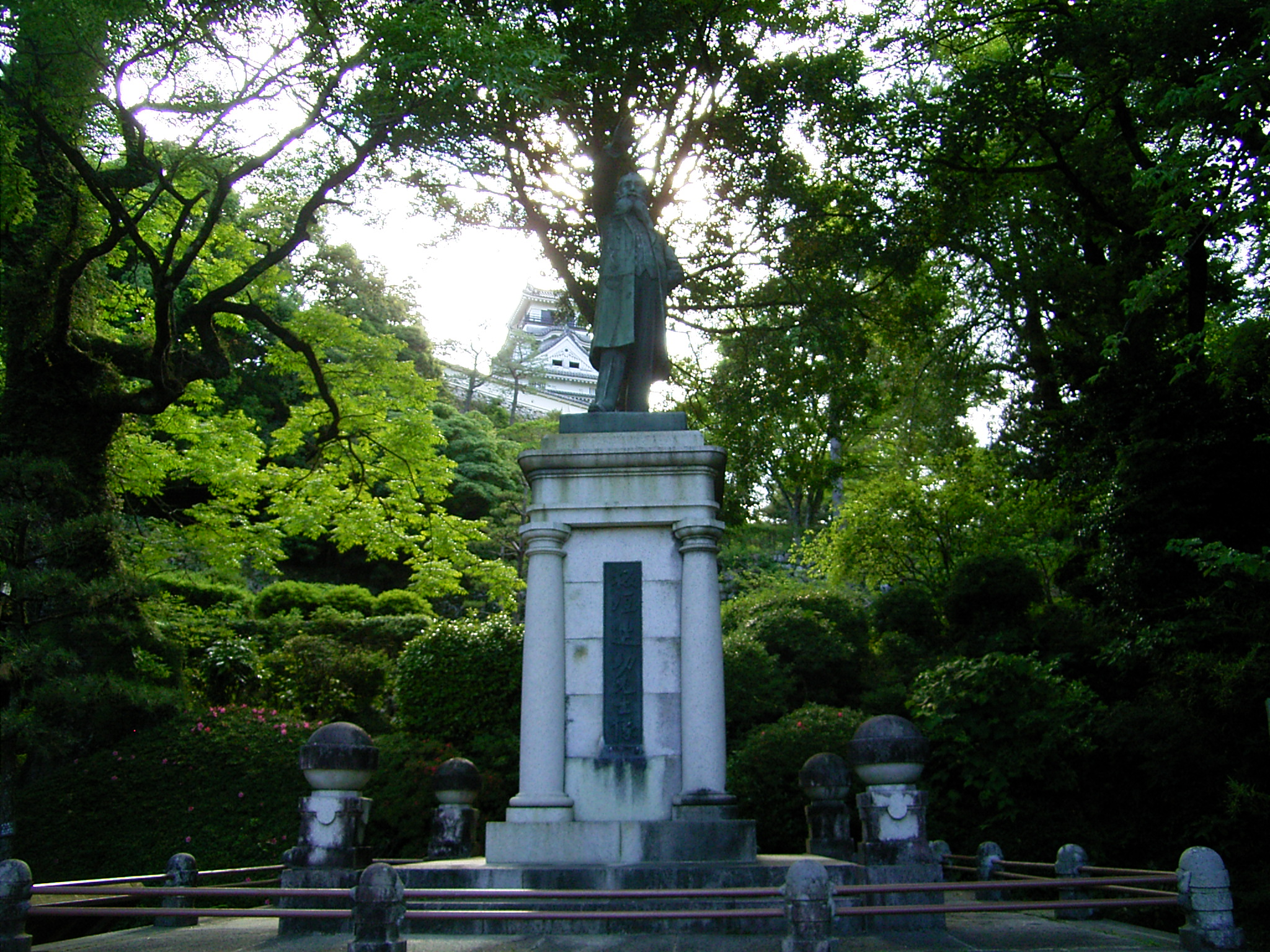
A bronze statue of Itagaki Taisuke in Kōchi Castle

Kōchi Castle (高知城, Kōchi-jō) is an Edo Period Japanese castle in the city of Kōchi, Kōchi Prefecture, Japan. It is located at Otakayama hill, at the center of Kōchi city, which in turn is located at the center of the Kōchi Plain, the most prosperous area of former Tosa Province on the island of Shikoku. From 1601 to 1871, it was the center of Tosa Domain, ruled by the tozama Yamauchi clan under the Tokugawa Shogunate. The castle site has been protected as a National Historic Site since 1959, with the area under protection expanded in 2014.

== History ==
During the Sengoku period, Tosa Province was dominated by Chōsokabe Motochika, who conquered most of Shikoku from stronghold at Okō Castle. However, Okō Castle was a mountain stronghold with little room for the development of a castle town. After his defeat by Toyotomi Hideyoshi in 1585, Motochika decided to construct a new castle at Otakayama hill and the ruins of an ancient fortification which had been constructed by Otakasa Matsuomaru sometime during the late Heian or Kamakura period. Although the new castle had the advantages of space and a central location, the area around the hill at this time was extremely swampy, due to the influx of alluvial sediments from the Kagami River, and was prone to flooding. Motochika shortly afterwards moved once again to a new location at Urado Castle on the coast, which also had the advantage of being closer to his fleet.

However, Motochika's successor Chōsokabe Morichika joined the pro-Toyotomi Western Army at the Battle of Sekigahara in 1600, and was subsequently deprived of his title, and later his life. The victorious Tokugawa shogunate ordered Yamauchi Kazutoyo, lord of Kakegawa Castle in Tōtōmi Province to take control of the province as daimyō of the newly created Tosa Domain, with a nominal kokudaka of 202,600 koku. Kazutoyo first entered Urado Castle, but its defenses were weak, so he rebuilt Otakayama Castle from 1601 to 1611 on a larger scale. He renamed the castle "Kawanakayama Castle", and later changed the name to Kōchi Castle.

Much of the original fortress burned down in 1727; it was reconstructed between 1729 and 1753 in the original style. During the Boshin War, Kōchi escaped any damage, and the castle was also exempted from the post-Meiji restoration orders to destroy all remaining feudal fortifications.The castle also survived the Pacific War unscathed, and underwent major restoration from 1948 to 1959. Though no battles were fought at the castle, it is noteworthy because the castle buildings are all historical structures, and not post-war replicas. It is also the only castle in Japan to retain both its historical tenshu, or keep, and its palace, the residence of the local daimyō. In fact, it is the only castle to have all the original buildings (from the 18th-century reconstruction) in the honmaru, or innermost ring of defense, still standing.

Kōchi Castle was listed as one of Japan's Top 100 Castles by the Japan Castle Foundation in 2006. The castle is a 20-minute walk from the JR Shikoku Kōchi Station.

=== Cultural Property Status ===
As one of only twelve castles with intact original main keeps in Japan, Kōchi Castle was formerly designated a National Treasure (国宝) before the 1950 National Treasure Protection Law (文化財保護法施) was enacted. After the law was passed, a number of surviving structures within the castle grounds were individually given National Important Cultural Property designations:

- Tenshu (天守)
- Kaitokukan palace (懐徳館)
- Nandokura (納戸蔵)
- Kuroganemon (黒鉄門)
- Nishi-tamon (西多聞)
- Higashi-tamon (東多聞)
- Tsume-mon (詰門)
- Rōkamon (廊下門)
- Ōtemon (追手門)
- Tenshu Southwest Arrow Wall (天守東南矢狭間塀)
- Tenshu Northwest Arrow Wall (天守西北矢狭間塀)
- Kurogamemon Northwest Arrow Wall (黒鉄門西北矢狭間塀)
- Kuroganemon Southeast Arrow Wall (黒鉄門東南矢狭間塀)
- Ōtemon Southwest Arrow Wall (追手門西南矢狭間塀)
- Ōtemon Northeast Arrow Wall (追手門東北矢狭間塀)
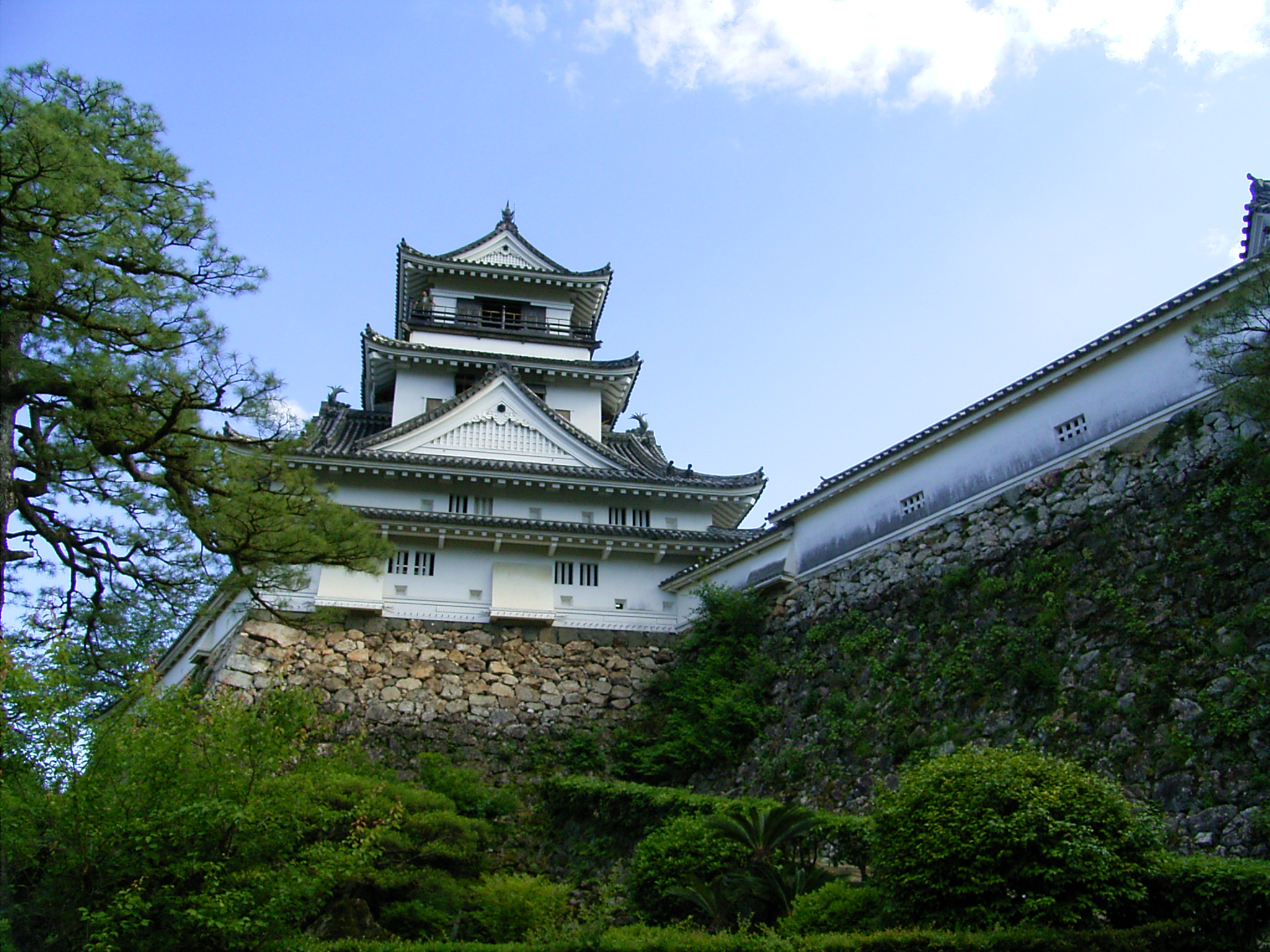
Tenshu and Tenshu Northwest Arrow Wall

Kuroganemon

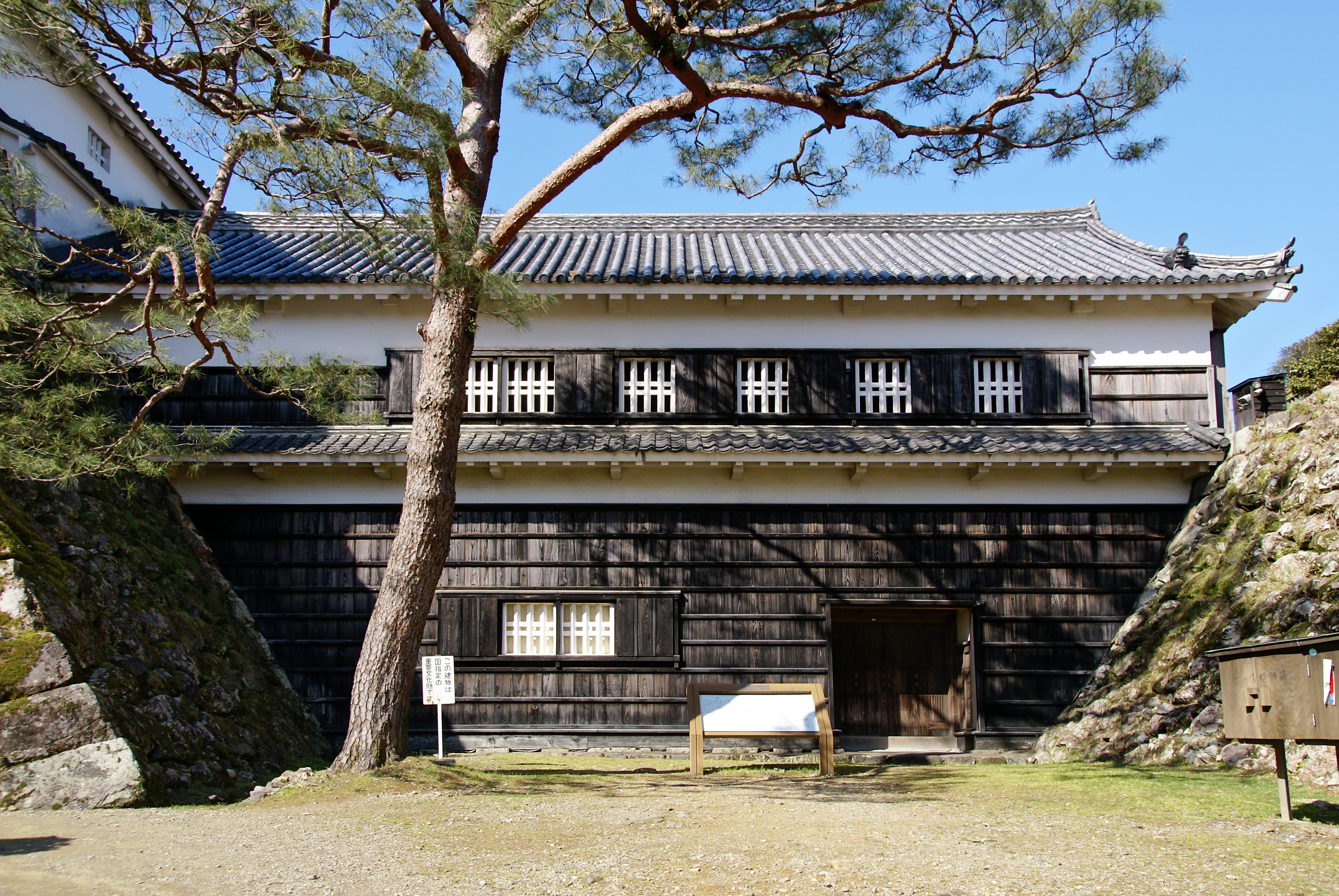
Tsume-mon

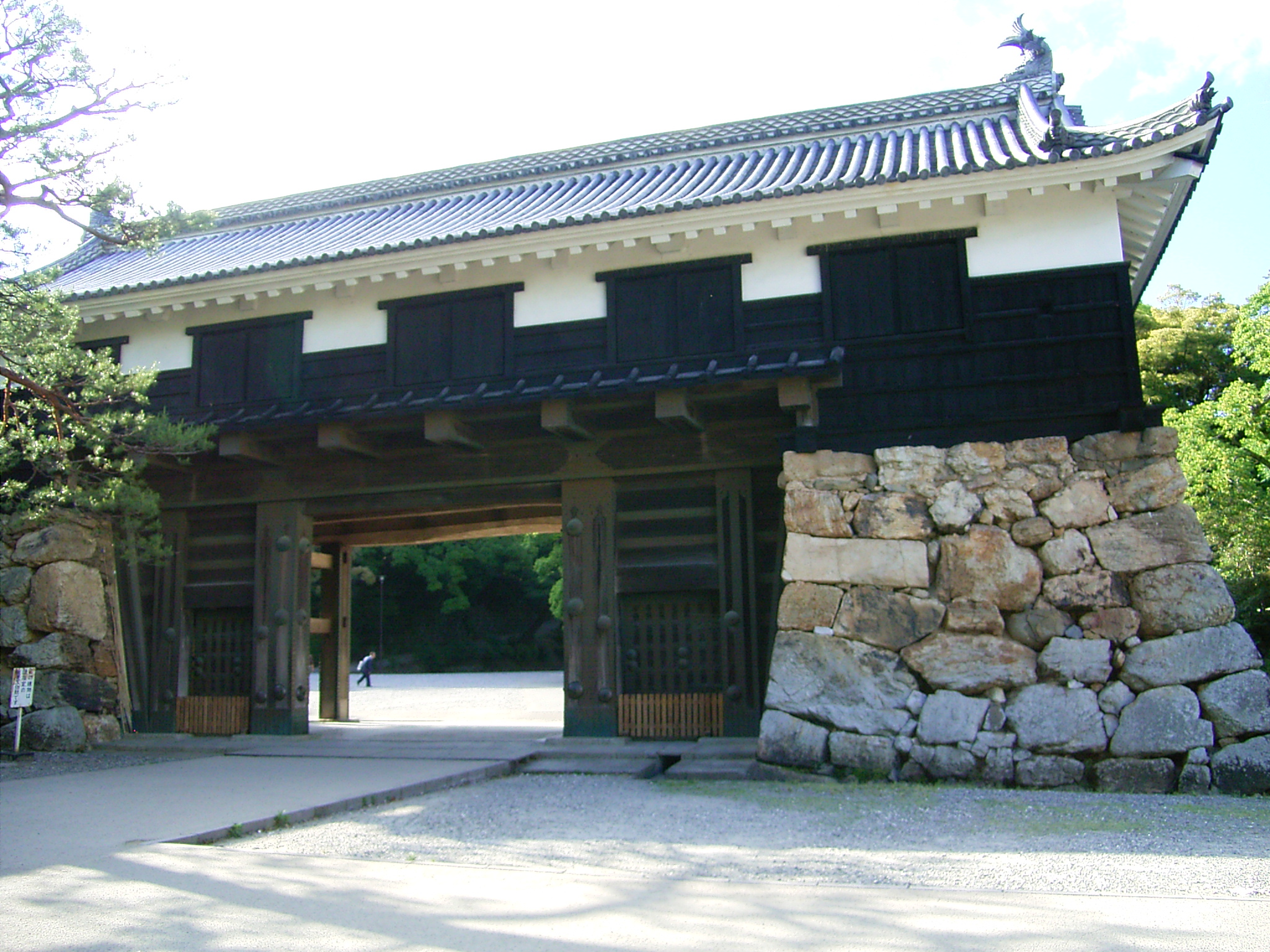
Ōtemon

== Structure ==
Two rivers, the Kagami River and the Enokuchi River, form the outer moat of the castle. The castle is relatively small, as it was constructed primarily as a defense against possible rebellion by former Chōsokabe retainers, who were very unhappy with the death of their lord and the imposition of rule by the Yamauchi clan and Tokugawa Shogunate. The central bailey at the peak of the hill is an isolated area connected to secondary bailey only by bridge, and wholly surrounded by stone walls and yagura watchtowers. In case of emergency the bridge could be destroyed and the isolated defenders in the tenshu could wait for the reinforcements from branch castles. The tenshu is five stories high and sits atop Otakasa Hill, commanding an extensive view of the city. Each roads from hillside area to central area are steep and folded, and climbing enemies are exposed to continuous attack from upper area, including main tower. Inside central area, other than the tenshu, the Kaitokukan palace was located. This was constructed in the Shoin style. The castle retains this structure today and has been fitted with period-appropriate items in the lower rooms. In addition to a tearoom, genkan (entrance area), and latrine, the Kaitokukan contains eight traditional rooms, ranging in size from three to twelve tatami. It is surrounded by a veranda on the east and south sides. The Kaitokukan also burned during the fire of 1727, but it was not repaired until 1747, with work completed in 1749.

Below the central area secondary area and other terraces covered with tall stone walls were built. The main gate of the castle located at southeast direction of the hill, and outer moat surrounded south half. The castle grounds are now a public park, and a popular location in spring for hanami. They contain the Prefectural Library and the Kōchi Literary Museum, in addition to statues of notable scions of the Yamauchi clan.

== See also ==
- List of Historic Sites of Japan (Kōchi)

== Literature ==
- Benesch, Oleg and Ran Zwigenberg (2019). Japan's Castles: Citadels of Modernity in War and Peace. Cambridge: Cambridge University Press. p. 374. ISBN 9781108481946.
- De Lange, William (2021). An Encyclopedia of Japanese Castles. Groningen: Toyo Press. pp. 600 pages. ISBN 978-9492722300.
- Mitchelhill, Jennifer (2013). Castles of the Samurai:Power & Beauty. USA: Kodansha. ISBN 978-1568365121.
- Schmorleitz, Morton S. (1974). Castles in Japan. Tokyo: Charles E. Tuttle Co. ISBN 0-8048-1102-4.
- Motoo, Hinago (1986). Japanese Castles. Tokyo: Kodansha. p. 200. ISBN 0-87011-766-1.
