= Yamauchi clan =

Japanese clan

Yamauchi 山内
- Home province: Bingo; Tosa
- Parent house: Fujiwara Hokke
- Titles: Various
- Cadet branches: Ōshū Yamauchi; Tosa Yamauchi

The Yamauchi clan (山内氏) was a family of rulers over what was then the Tosa Province which spanned the southern half of Shikoku island.

The province was given to the family in 1600 after Yamauchi Kazutoyo led troops under Tokugawa Ieyasu at the Battle of Sekigahara. The family stayed loyal to the Tokugawa dynasty until shortly before its overthrow in 1868. The head of the family at that time Yamauchi Toyoshige became prince of the newly formed Kōchi Prefecture under Imperial rule.

== Notable members ==
- Yamauchi Kazutoyo
- Yamauchi Chiyo
- Yamauchi Toyoshige
- Iwasaki Yatarō (clan retainer & founder of Mitsubishi)
