= Noichi Station =

Railway station in Kōnan, Kōchi Prefecture, Japan

Noichi Station のいち駅
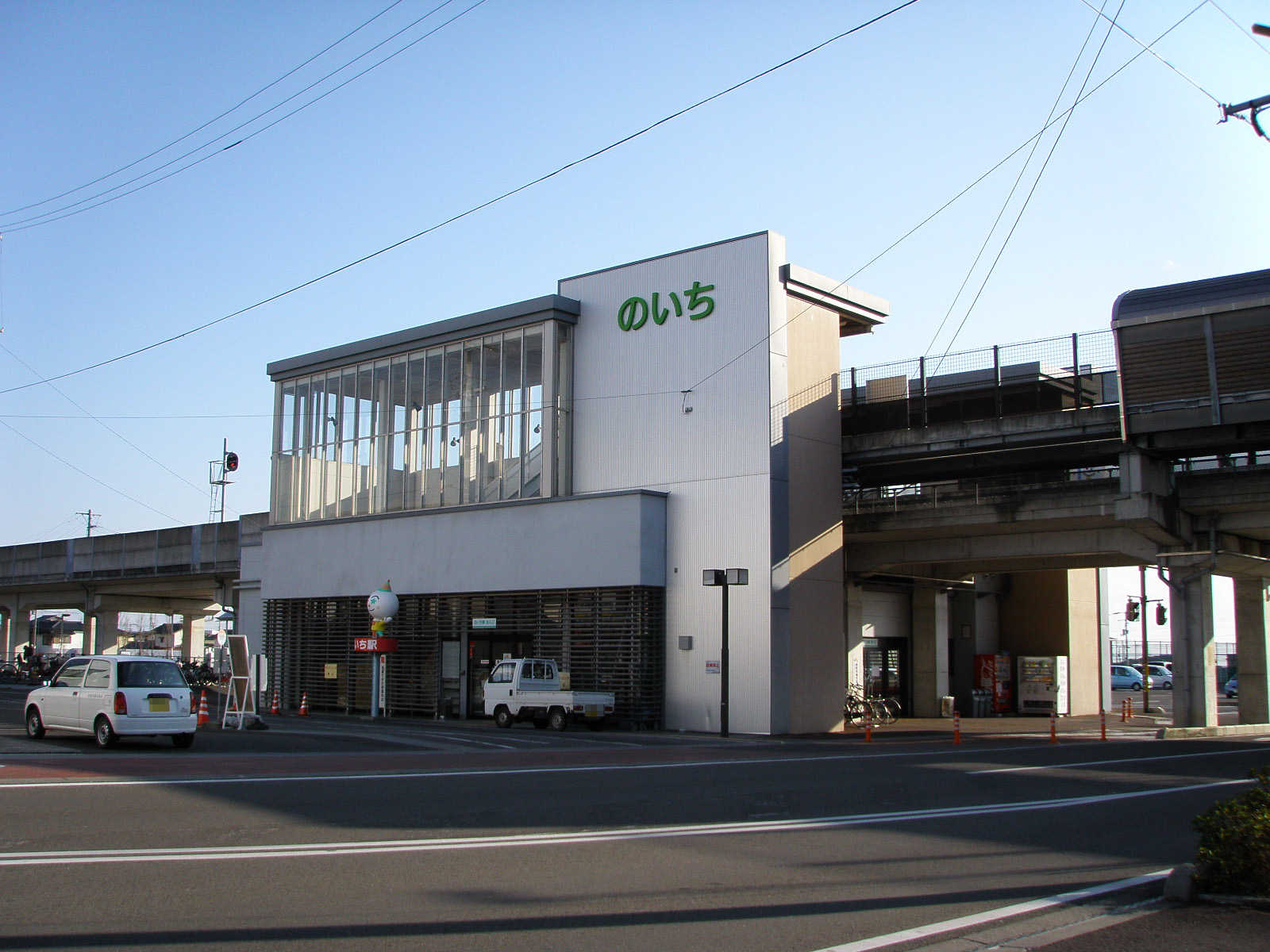
- Noichi Station in 2007

General information
- Location: Noichicho Nishino, Konan-shi, Kōchi-ken 781-5232; Japan
- Coordinates: 33°33′43″N 133°41′52″E
- Operator: Tosa Kuroshio Railway
- Line: ■ Asa Line
- Distance: 5.7 km from Gomen
- Platforms: 2 side platforms
- Tracks: 2

Construction
- Structure type: Elevated

Other information
- Status: Staffed kan'i itaku ticket window
- Station code: GN37
- Website: Official website

History
- Opened: 1 July 2002

Passengers
- FY2011: 1,265 daily
Location
- Location within Kochi Prefecture Location within Japan

Noichi Station (のいち駅, Noichi-eki) is a passenger railway station located in the city of Kōnan, Kōchi Prefecture, Japan. It is operated by the third-sector Tosa Kuroshio Railway with the station number "GN37".

== Lines ==
The station is served by the Asa Line and is located 5.7 km from the beginning of the line at Gomen. All Asa Line trains, rapid and local, stop at the station.

== Layout ==
The station consists of two opposed side platforms serving two elevated tracks. Track/platform 1 is used for eastbound trains and track/platform 2 is for the westbound ones. The station building is built into the elevated structure underneath the tracks and houses a waiting area and a shop. The shop is operated by the Koan City Tourism Association which also staffs the ticket window as a kan'i itaku agent. Access to the platforms is by a flight of steps or elevators.

== Adjacent stations ==
«	Service	»
Asa Line
Gomenmachi	Rapid	Akaoka
Tateda	Local	Yoshikawa

== Station mascot ==
Each station on the Asa Line features a cartoon mascot character designed by Takashi Yanase, a local cartoonist from Kōchi Prefecture. The mascot for Noichi Station is a clown named Noichin Donman (のいちんどんまん). A statue of this mascot is located near the station entrance. The character relates to a chindon'ya (Japanese costumed marching band) competition which is held in Noichi annually.

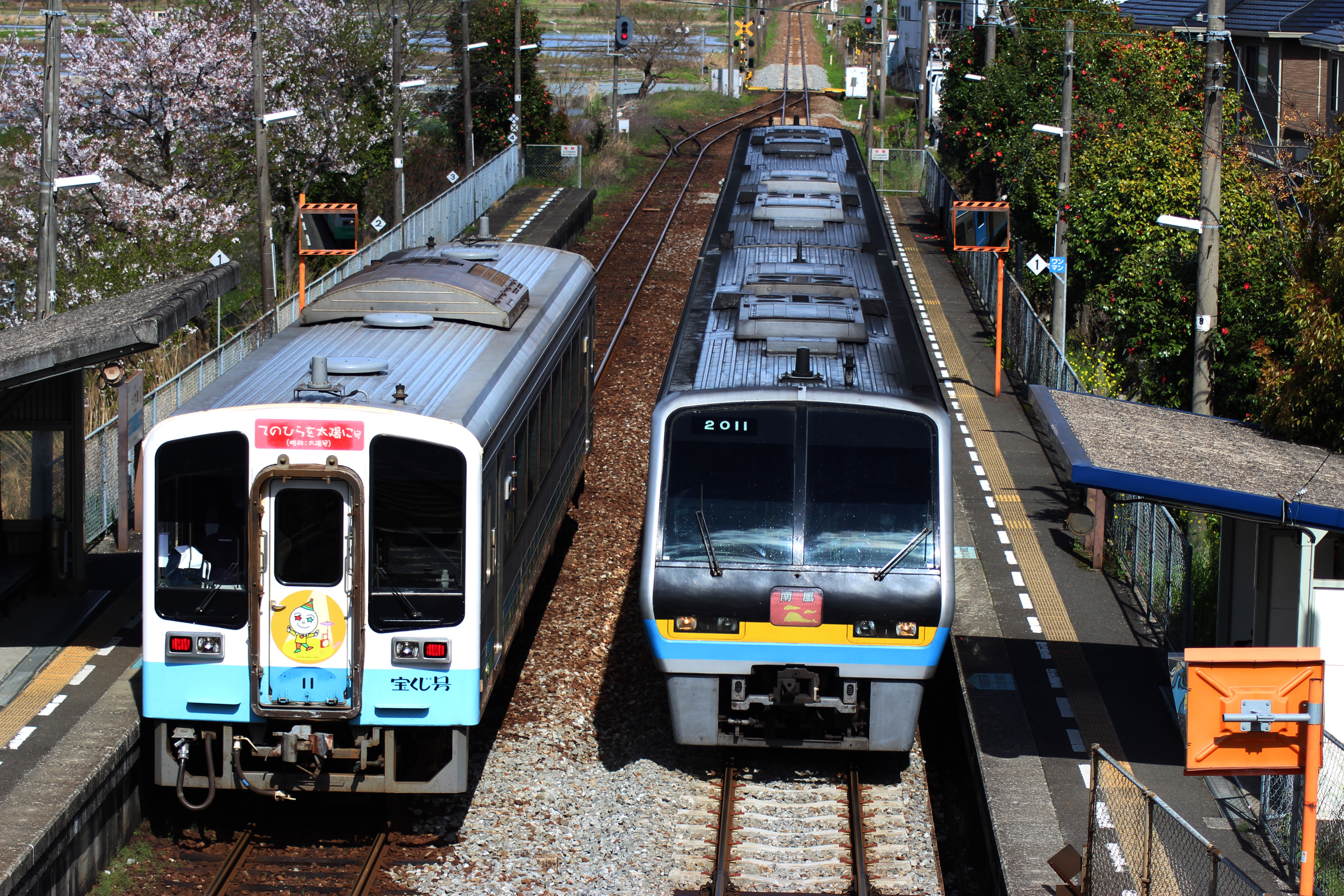
The picture of the Donman mascot is on the front of this Asa Line 9640 DMU to the left. The train is at Tosa-Otsu.

== History ==
The train station was opened on 1 July 2002 by the Tosa Kuroshio Railway as an intermediate station on its track from Gomen to Nahari.

== Passenger statistics ==
In fiscal 2011, the station was used by an average of 1,265 passengers daily.

== Surrounding area ==
- Konan City Hall (formerly Noichi Town Hall)
- Konan City Noichi Elementary School
- Shikoku Automobile Museum
- Japan National Route 55

== See also ==
- List of railway stations in Japan
