= Ananai Station =

Railway station in Aki, Kōchi Prefecture, Japan

Ananai Station 穴内駅
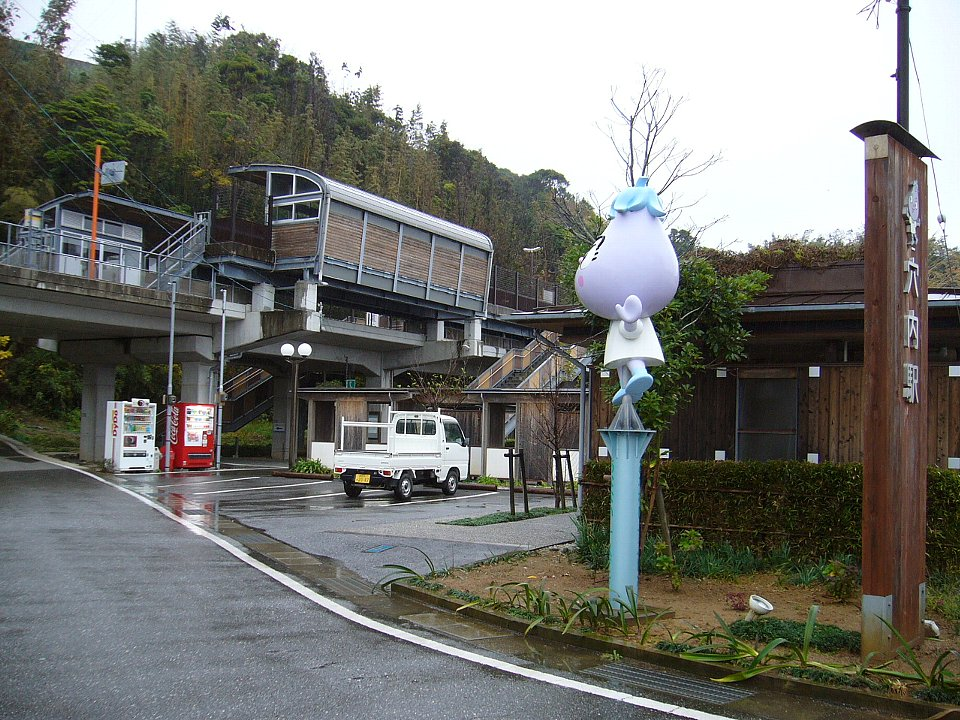
- Ananai Station with mascot character in 2010

General information
- Location: Ananaiotsu, Aki-shi, Kōchi-ken 784-0032; Japan
- Coordinates: 33°30′22″N 133°51′52″E
- Operator: Tosa Kuroshio Railway
- Line: ■ Asa Line
- Distance: 23.6 km from Gomen
- Platforms: 2 side platforms
- Tracks: 2

Construction
- Structure type: Elevated
- Parking: Available
- Cycle facilities: Bike shed
- Accessible: No - steps lead up to platform

Other information
- Status: Unstaffed
- Station code: GN29

History
- Opened: 1 July 2002

Passengers
- FY2011: 8 daily
Location
- Location within Kochi Prefecture Location within Japan

Ananai Station (穴内駅, Ananai-eki) is a passenger railway station located in the city of Aki, Kōchi Prefecture, Japan. It is operated by the third-sector Tosa Kuroshio Railway with the station number "GN29".

== Lines ==
The station is served by the Asa Line and is located 23.6 km from the beginning of the line at Gomen. local trains and partly rapid train which runs in the morning stop at the station from 2021.

== Layout ==
The station consists of two opposed side platforms serving two elevated tracks. There is no station building and the station is unstaffed but both platforms are equipped with shelters comprising both an open and an enclosed compartment. Access to the two platforms is by separate flights of steps. Near the station entrance, another timber-built waiting room has been set up, together with a bike shed and parking lots for cars.

== Adjacent stations ==
«	Service	»
Asa Line
Rapid: Does not stop at this station
Akano	Local	Kyūjōmae

== Station mascot ==
Each station on the Asa Line features a cartoon mascot character designed by Takashi Yanase, a local cartoonist from Kōchi Prefecture. The mascot for Ananai Station is a figure with an eggplant for a head named Ananai Nasubi-san (あなない ナスビさん). The design is chosen because eggplant is a specialty product of the area.

== History ==
The train station was opened on 1 July 2002 by the Tosa Kuroshio Railway as an intermediate station on its track from Gomen to Nahari.

== Passenger statistics ==
In fiscal 2011, the station was used by an average of 8 passengers daily.

== Surrounding area ==
- Japan National Route 55

== See also ==
- List of railway stations in Japan
