= Akaoka Station =

Railway station in Kōnan, Kōchi Prefecture, Japan

Akaoka Station あかおか駅
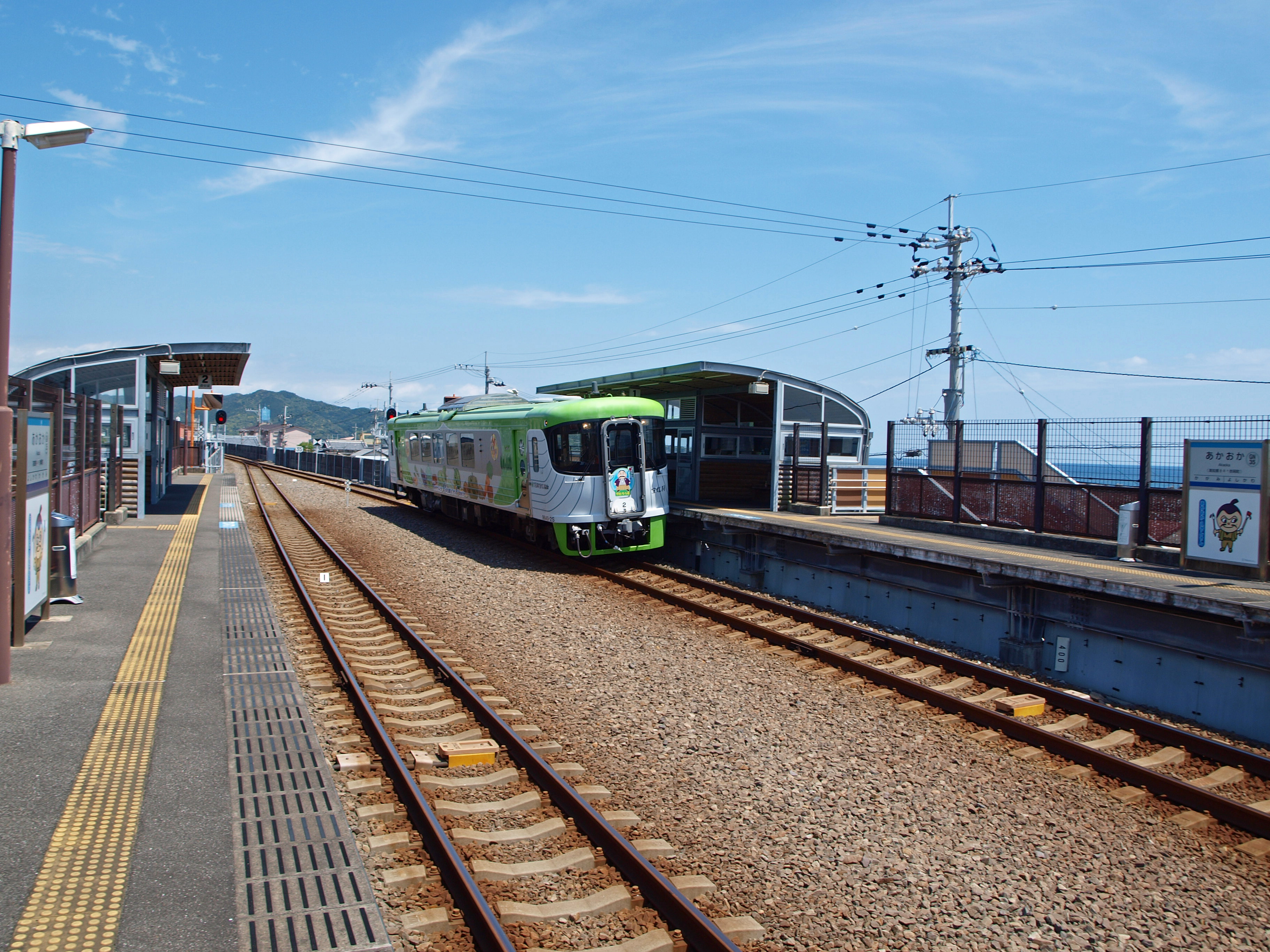
- Akaoka Station in 2010

General information
- Location: Japan
- Coordinates: 33°32′24″N 133°43′20″E
- Operator: Tosa Kuroshio Railway
- Line: ■ Asa Line
- Distance: 9.3 km from Gomen
- Platforms: 2 side platforms
- Tracks: 2

Construction
- Structure type: Elevated

Other information
- Status: Unstaffed
- Station code: GN35

History
- Opened: 1 July 2002

Passengers
- FY2011: 268 daily
Location
- Location within Kochi Prefecture Location within Japan

Akaoka Station (あかおか駅, Akaoka-eki) is a passenger railway station located in the city of Kōnan, Kōchi Prefecture, Japan. It is operated by the third-sector Tosa Kuroshio Railway with the station number "GN35".

== Lines ==
The station is served by the Asa Line and is located 9.3 km from the beginning of the line at Gomen. All Asa Line trains, both rapid and local, stop at the station.

== Layout ==
The station consists of two opposed side platforms serving two elevated tracks. There is no station building but both platforms have enclosed shelters for waiting passengers. A shop cum tourist information centre under the elevated structure also serves as a waiting room. Access to the two platforms is by separate flights of steps. A designated parking area is provided for bicycles under the elevated structure.

== Adjacent stations ==
«	Service	»
Asa Line
Noichi	Rapid	Yasu
Yoshikawa	Local	Kagami

== Station mascot ==
Each station on the Asa Line features a cartoon mascot character designed by Takashi Yanase, a local cartoonist from Kōchi Prefecture. The mascot for Akaoka Station is an artist holding two paintbrushes named Akaoka Ekin-san (あかおか えきんさん), recalling Hirose Kinzō, a Japanese painter who lived in Akaoka at the end of the Edo period. A display of figurines of the various station mascots on the Asa Line is located under the elevated structure at Akaoka Station.

== History ==
The train station was opened on 1 July 2002 by the Tosa Kuroshio Railway as an intermediate station on its track from Gomen to Nahari.

== Passenger statistics ==
In fiscal 2011, the station was used by an average of 268 passengers daily.

== Surrounding area ==
- Konan City Hall Asaoka branch (formerly Asaoka Town Hall)
- Kochi Prefectural Shiroyama High School
- Konan Municipal Akaoka Junior High School
- Japan National Route 55

== See also ==
- List of railway stations in Japan
