= Yasuda Station (Kōchi) =

Railway station in Yasuda, Kōchi Prefecture, Japan

Yasuda Station 安田駅
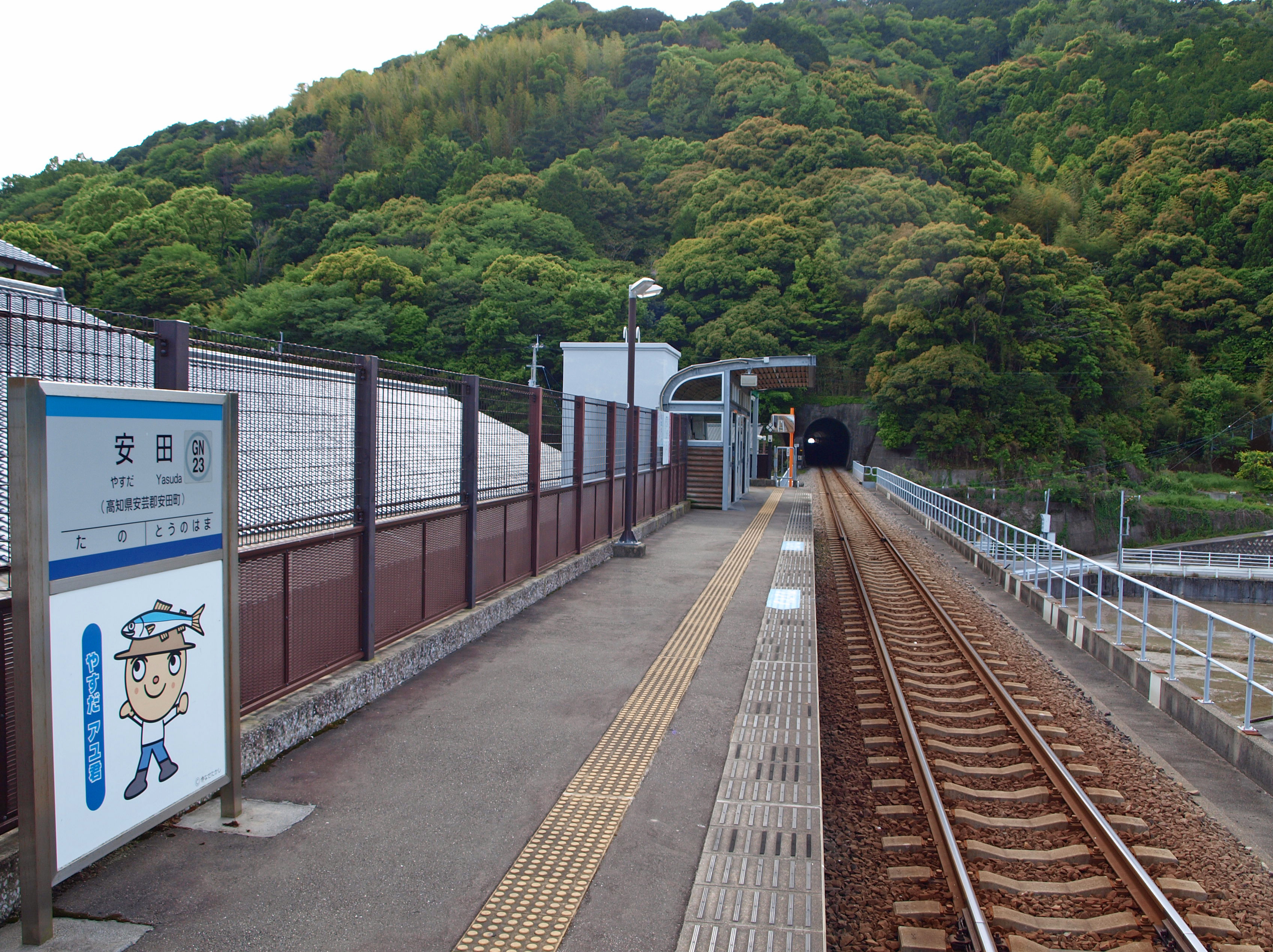
- Yasuda Station in 2010

General information
- Location: Nishijima, Yasuda-cho, Aki-gun, Kōchi-ken 781-6423; Japan
- Coordinates: 33°26′36″N 133°59′03″E
- Operator: Tosa Kuroshio Railway
- Line: ■ Asa Line
- Distance: 38.7 km from Gomen
- Platforms: 1 side platform
- Tracks: 1

Construction
- Structure type: Elevated
- Accessible: Yes - elevator to platform

Other information
- Status: Unstaffed
- Station code: GN23

History
- Opened: 1 July 2002

Passengers
- FY2011: 119 daily
Location
- Location within Japan

Yasuda Station (安田駅, Yasuda-eki) is a railway station on the Asa Line in Yasuda, Aki District, Kōchi Prefecture, Japan. It is operated by the third-sector Tosa Kuroshio Railway with the station number "GN23".

== Lines ==
The station is served by the Asa Line and is located 38.7 km from the beginning of the line at Gomen. All Asa Line trains, rapid and local, stop at the station except for those which start or end their trips at Aki.

== Layout ==
The station consists of a side platform serving a single elevated track. There is no station building but a shelter with both an enclosed and an open compartment has been set up on the platform. Access to the platform is by means of a flight of steps or an elevator.

== Adjacent stations ==
«	Service	»
Asa Line
Tōnohama	Rapid	Tano
Tōnohama	Local	Tano

== Station mascot ==
Each station on the Asa Line features a cartoon mascot character designed by Takashi Yanase, a local cartoonist from Kōchi Prefecture. The mascot for Yasuda Station is a boy wearing a hat with a fish on it. Named Yasuda Ayu-kun (やすだ アユ君), the character is chosen because the nearby Yasudagawa river is known for its Ayu fish.

== History ==
The train station was opened on 1 July 2002 by the Tosa Kuroshio Railway as an intermediate station on its track from Gomen to Nahari.

== Passenger statistics ==
In fiscal 2011, the station was used by an average of 119 passengers daily.

== See also ==
- List of railway stations in Japan
