= Yasu Station =

Yasu Station is the name of two train stations in Japan:

- Yasu Station (Kōchi), Konan, Kochi prefecture
- Yasu Station (Shiga), Yasu, Shiga prefecture
