= Tōnohama Station =

Railway station in Yasuda, Kōchi Prefecture, Japan

Tōnohama Station 下山駅
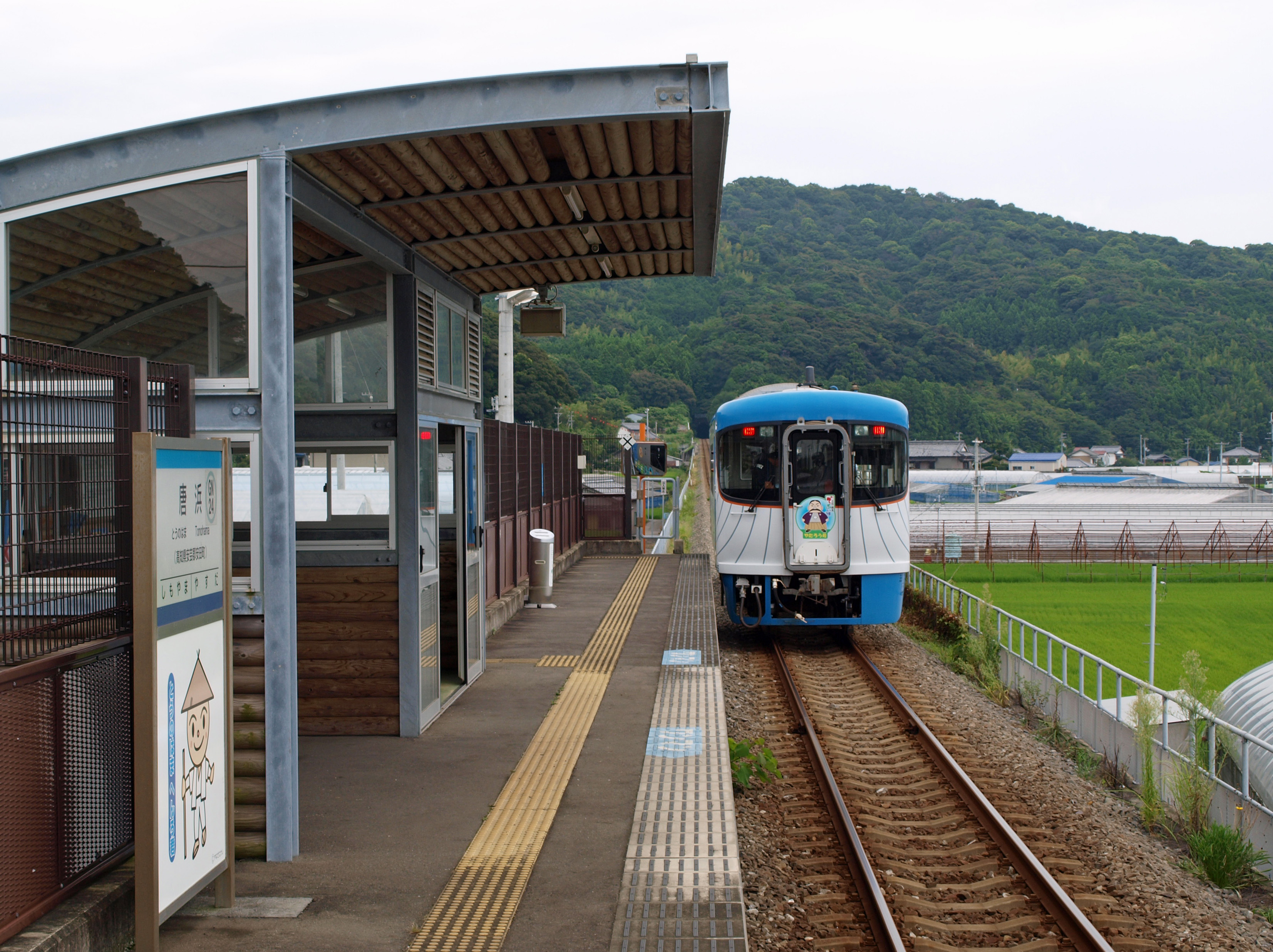
- Tōnohama Station in 2009

General information
- Location: Tonohama, Yasuda-cho, Aki-gun, Kōchi-ken 781-6422; Japan
- Coordinates: 33°26′46″N 133°57′58″E
- Operator: Tosa Kuroshio Railway
- Line: ■ Asa Line
- Distance: 37.0 km from Gomen
- Platforms: 1 side platform
- Tracks: 1

Construction
- Structure type: Embankment
- Parking: Available
- Cycle facilities: Bike shed
- Accessible: Yes - ramp to platform

Other information
- Status: Unstaffed
- Station code: GN24

History
- Opened: 1 July 2002

Passengers
- FY2011: 49 daily
Location
- Location within Japan

Tōnohama Station (唐浜駅, Tōnohama-eki) is a railway station on the Asa Line in Yasuda, Aki District, Kōchi Prefecture, Japan. It is operated by the third-sector Tosa Kuroshio Railway with the station number "GN24".

== Lines ==
The station is served by the Asa Line and is located 37.0 km from the beginning of the line at Gomen. All Asa Line trains, rapid and local, stop at the station except for those which start or end their trips at Aki.

== Layout ==
The station consists of a side platform serving a single track on an embankment. There is no station building but a shelter with both an enclosed and an open compartment has been set up on the platform. A separate waiting room, toilet and bicycle shed have been set in the station forecourt where parking for cars is available. Access to the platform is by means of a short flight of steps or a ramp.

== Adjacent stations ==
«	Service	»
Asa Line
Shimoyama	Rapid	Yasuda
Shimoyama	Local	Yasuda

== Station mascot ==
Each station on the Asa Line features a cartoon mascot character designed by Takashi Yanase, a local cartoonist from Kōchi Prefecture. The mascot for Tōnohama Station is a figure dressed in the white pilgrim's garments and straw hat used by those on the Shikoku Pilgrimage. Named Tōnohama Hen-kun (とうのはま へんろ君), the character is chosen because the station is located near the Kōnomine-ji, the 27th Buddhist temple on the pilgrim trail and many pilgrims use the station throughout the year.

== History ==
The train station was opened on 1 July 2002 by the Tosa Kuroshio Railway as an intermediate station on its track from Gomen to Nahari.

== Passenger statistics ==
In fiscal 2011, the station was used by an average of 49 passengers daily.

== See also ==
- List of railway stations in Japan
