= Wajiki Station =

Railway station in Geisei, Kōchi Prefecture, Japan

Wajiki Station 和食駅
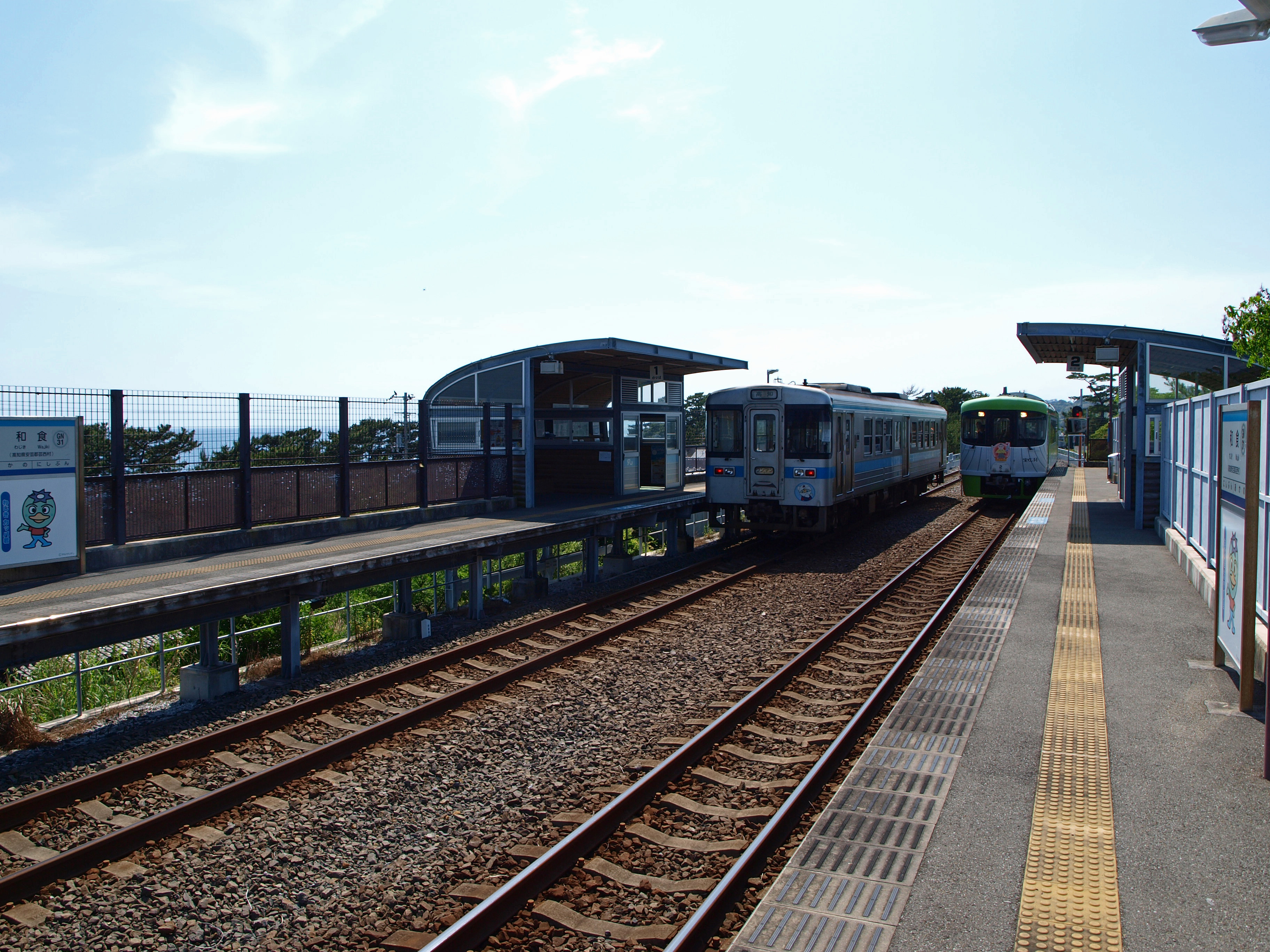
- Wajiki Station in 2010

General information
- Location: Wajiki, Geisei-mura, Aki-gun, Kōchi-ken 781-5700; Japan
- Coordinates: 33°31′05″N 133°48′31″E
- Operator: Tosa Kuroshio Railway
- Line: ■ Asa Line
- Distance: 18.2 km from Gomen
- Platforms: 2 side platforms
- Tracks: 2

Construction
- Structure type: Embankment
- Parking: Available
- Cycle facilities: Bike shed
- Accessible: No - steps to platform

Other information
- Status: Unstaffed
- Station code: GN31

History
- Opened: 1 July 2002

Passengers
- FY2011: 223 daily
Location
- Location within Kochi Prefecture Location within Japan

Wajiki Station (和食駅, Wajiki-eki) is a passenger railway station located in the village of Geisei, Aki District, Kōchi Prefecture, Japan. It is operated by the third-sector Tosa Kuroshio Railway with the station number "GN31".

== Lines ==
The station is served by the Asa Line and is located 18.2 km from the beginning of the line at Gomen. All Asa Line trains, both rapid and local, stop at the station.

== Layout ==
The station consists of an island platform serving two tracks on an embankment. There is no station building and the station is unstaffed but a waiting room has been set up at the base of the embankment together with parking lots and a bike shed. Access to the platforms is by two separate flights of steps.

== Adjacent stations ==
«	Service	»
Asa Line
Yasu	Rapid	Kyūjōmae
Nishibun	Local	Akano

== Station mascot ==
Each station on the Asa Line features a cartoon mascot character designed by Takashi Yanase, a local cartoonist from Kōchi Prefecture. The mascot for Wajiki Station is a kappa named Wajiki Kappa-kun (わじき カッパ君). The design is chosen because local folklore refers to kappa, a river Yōkai (imp or demon), inhabits the nearby Wajiki river.

== History ==
The train station was opened on 1 July 2002 by the Tosa Kuroshio Railway as an intermediate station on its track from Gomen to Nahari.

== Passenger statistics ==
In fiscal 2011, the station was used by an average of 223 passengers daily.

== Surrounding area ==
- Japan National Route 55

== See also ==
- List of railway stations in Japan
