= Akano Station =

Railway station in Aki, Kōchi Prefecture, Japan

Akano Station 赤野駅
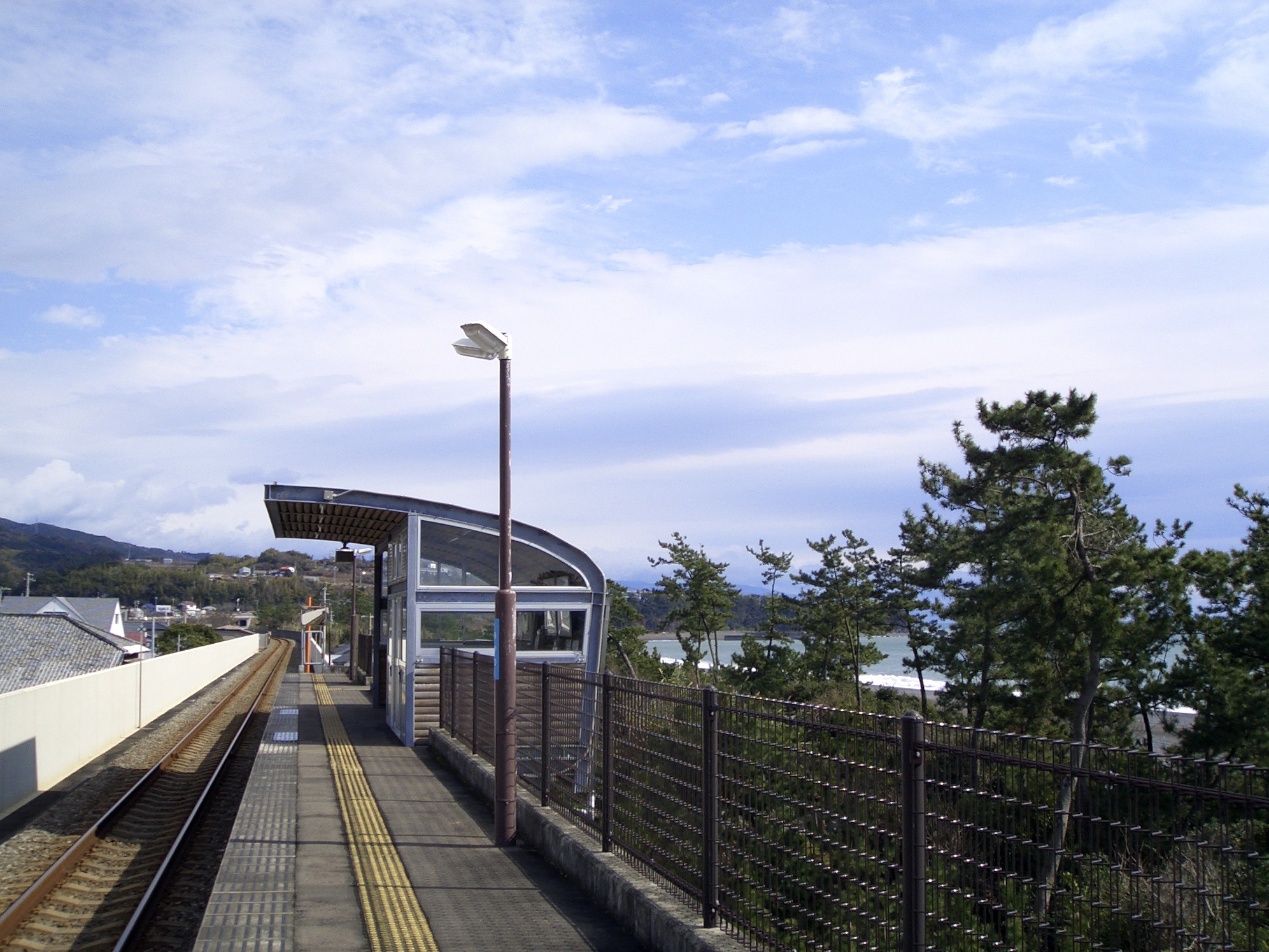
- Akano Station in 2007

General information
- Location: Akanootsu, Aki-shi, Kōchi-ken 784-0034; Japan
- Coordinates: 33°30′58″N 133°49′28″E
- Operator: Tosa Kuroshio Railway
- Line: ■ Asa Line
- Distance: 19.6 km from Gomen
- Platforms: 1 side platform
- Tracks: 1

Construction
- Structure type: Elevated
- Parking: Available
- Cycle facilities: Bike shed
- Accessible: No - steps lead up to platform

Other information
- Status: Unstaffed
- Station code: GN30

History
- Opened: 1 July 2002

Passengers
- FY2011: 42 daily
Location
- Location within Kochi Prefecture Location within Japan

Akano Station (赤野駅, Akano-eki) is a passenger railway station located in the city of Aki, Kōchi Prefecture, Japan. It is operated by the third-sector Tosa Kuroshio Railway with the station number "GN30".

== Lines ==
The station is served by the Asa Line and is located 19.6 km from the beginning of the line at Gomen. local trains and rapid train which runs in the morning stop at the station.

== Layout ==
The station consists of a side platform serving a single elevated track. There is no station building and the station is unstaffed but a shelter comprising both an open and an enclosed compartment is provided on the platform for waiting passengers. Access to the platform is by means of a flight of steps. Another waiting room is provided near the station entrance at the base of the elevated structure, together with parking lots and a bike shed.

== Adjacent stations ==
«	Service	»
Asa Line
Rapid: Does not stop at this station
Wajiki	Local	Ananai

== Station mascot ==
Each station on the Asa Line features a cartoon mascot character designed by Takashi Yanase, a local cartoonist from Kōchi Prefecture. The mascot for Akano Station is a figure of a seagull dressed in a sailor suit named Akano Kamome-chan (あかの カモメちゃん). The design is chosen because the line runs by the coast of the Pacific Ocean near the station and many seagulls can be seen in the area.

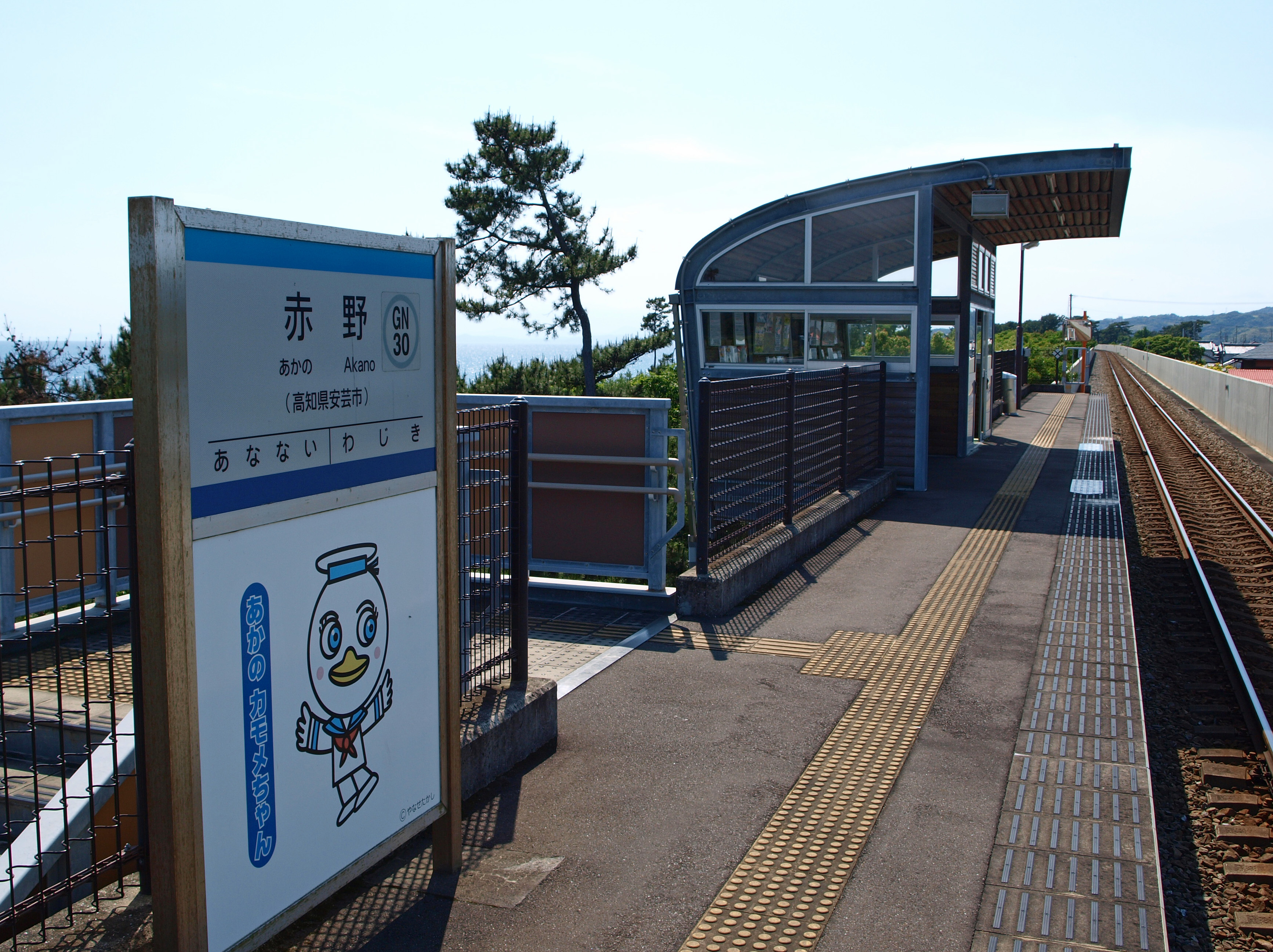
A picture of the mascot can be seen under the station name board.

== History ==
The train station was opened on 1 July 2002 by the Tosa Kuroshio Railway as an intermediate station on its track from Gomen to Nahari.

== Passenger statistics ==
In fiscal 2011, the station was used by an average of 42 passengers daily.

== Surrounding area ==
- Japan National Route 55

== See also ==
- List of railway stations in Japan

== See also ==
- List of railway stations in Japan
