= Shimoyama Station (Kōchi) =

Railway station in Aki, Kōchi Prefecture, Japan

Shimoyama Station 下山駅
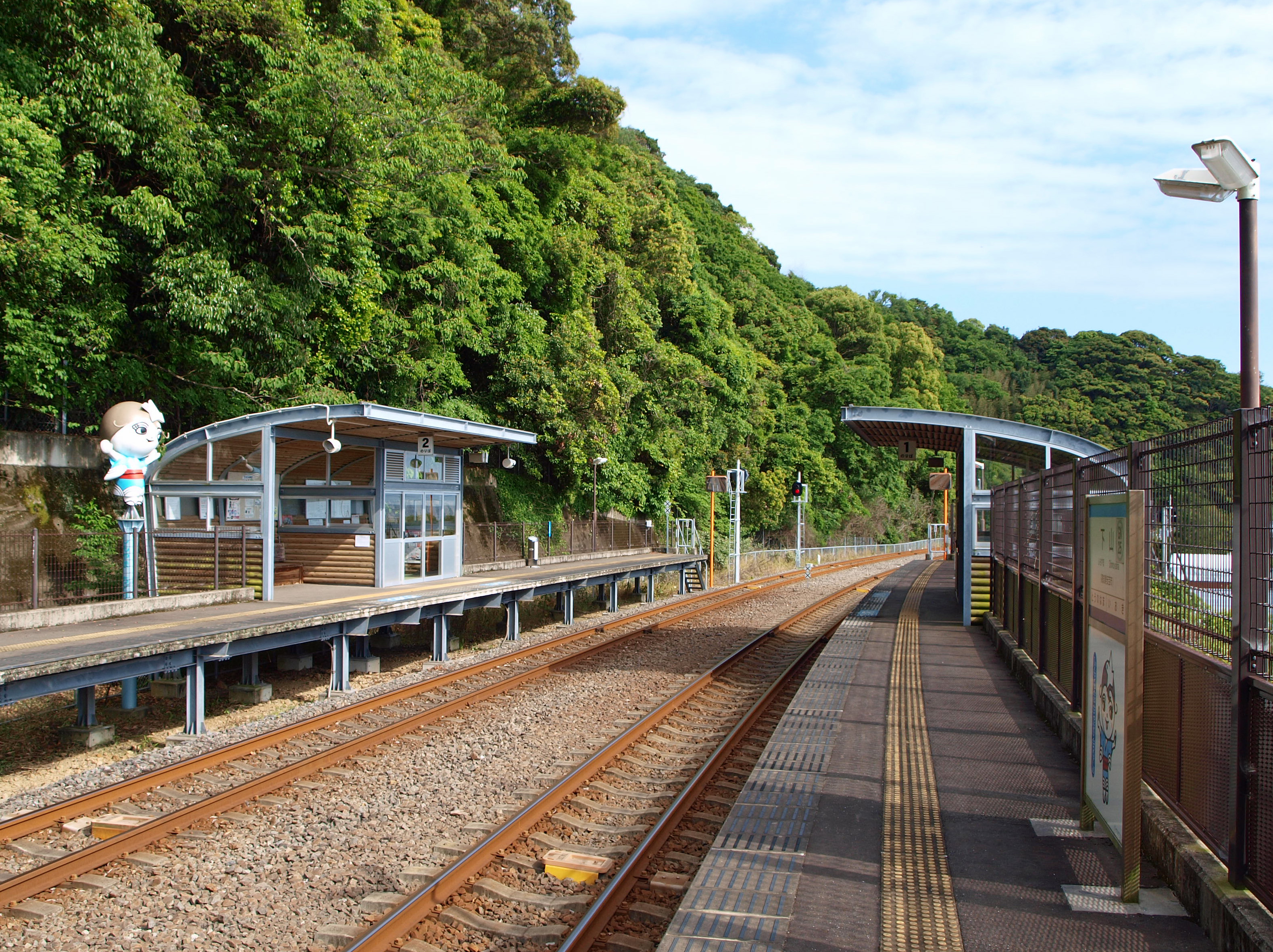
- Shimoyama Station in 2010

General information
- Location: Shimoyama, Aki-shi, Kōchi-ken 784-0046; Japan
- Coordinates: 33°27′29″N 133°56′53″E
- Operator: Tosa Kuroshio Railway
- Line: ■ Asa Line
- Distance: 34.7 km from Gomen
- Platforms: 2 side platforms
- Tracks: 2

Construction
- Structure type: Embankment
- Cycle facilities: Bike shed
- Accessible: No - steps to platform

Other information
- Status: Unstaffed
- Station code: GN25

History
- Opened: 1 July 2002

Passengers
- FY2011: 16 daily
Location
- Location within Kochi Prefecture Location within Japan

Shimoyama Station (下山駅, Shimoyama-eki) is a passenger railway station located in the city of Aki, Kōchi Prefecture, Japan. It is operated by the third-sector Tosa Kuroshio Railway with the station number "GN25".

== Lines ==
The station is served by the Asa Line and is located 34.7 km from the beginning of the line at Gomen. All Asa Line trains, rapid and local, stop at the station except for those which start or end their trips at Aki.

== Layout ==
The station consists of two opposed side platforms serving two tracks on an embankment. There is no station building but both platforms have shelters comprising enclosed and open compartments. A separate waiting room and bicycle shed, both built of timber, have been set up near the station entrance. From the access road, a low flight of steps leads to the base of the embankment where there is a flight of steps which leads to one platform. Going through an underpass, there is another flight of steps to the other platform.

== Adjacent stations ==
«	Service	»
Asa Line
Ioki	Rapid	Tōnohama
Ioki	Local	Tōnohama

== Station mascot ==
Each station on the Asa Line features a cartoon mascot character designed by Takashi Yanase, a local cartoonist from Kōchi Prefecture. The mascot for Shimoyama Station is a girl in a blue kimono with a white bird on her head. Her name is Shimoyama Chidori-chan (しもやま ちどりちゃん) and is inspired by the children's song Hama Chidori (浜千鳥) (Plovers on the Beach) written by local composer Ryūtarō Hirota. There is a monument to him at nearby Cape Oyama.

== History ==
The train station was opened on 1 July 2002 by the Tosa Kuroshio Railway as an intermediate station on its track from Gomen to Nahari.

== Passenger statistics ==
In fiscal 2011, the station was used by an average of 16 passengers daily.

== Surrounding area ==
- Japan National Route 55
- Aki Municipal Shimoyama Elementary School

== See also ==
- List of railway stations in Japan
