= Tateda Station =

Railway station in Nankoku, Kōchi Prefecture, Japan

Tateda Station 立田駅
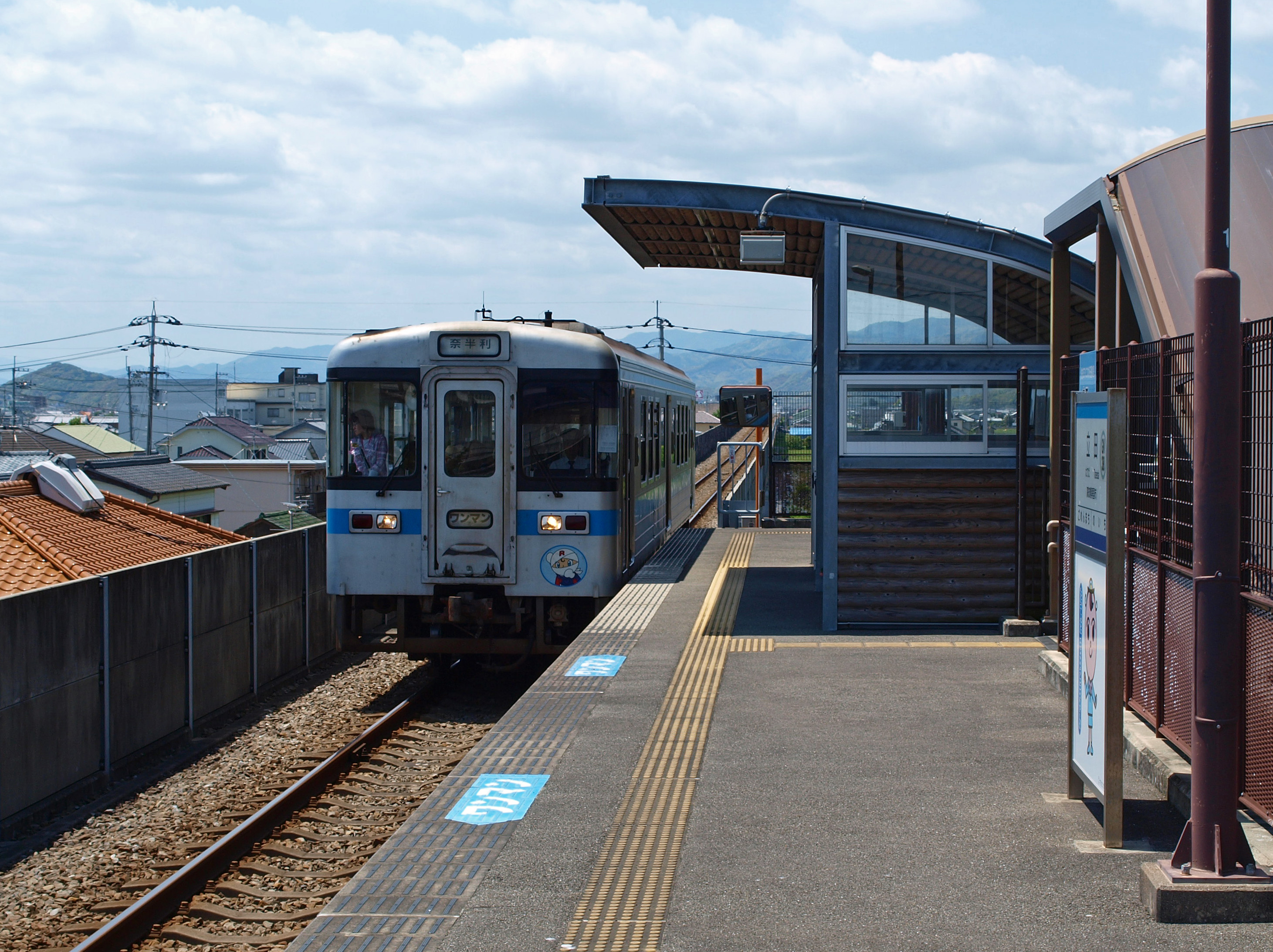
- Tateda Station in 2010

General information
- Location: Tateda, Nankoku-shi, Kōchi-ken 783-0091; Japan
- Coordinates: 33°34′14″N 133°40′14″E
- Operator: Tosa Kuroshio Railway
- Line: ■ Asa Line
- Distance: 2.9 km from Gomen (start of the Dosan Line)
- Platforms: 1 side platform
- Tracks: 1

Construction
- Structure type: Elevated

Other information
- Status: Unstaffed
- Station code: GN38

History
- Opened: 1 July 2002

Passengers
- FY2019: 20 daily
Location
- Location within Kochi Prefecture Location within Japan

Tateda Station (立田駅, Tateda-eki) is a passenger railway station located in the city of Nankoku, Kōchi Prefecture, Japan. It is operated by the third-sector Tosa Kuroshio Railway with the station number "GN38".

== Lines ==
The station is served by the Asa Line and is located 2.9 km from the beginning of the line at Gomen. Only local trains on the line stop at the station.

== Layout ==
The station consists of a side platform serving a single elevated track. There is no station building but the platform has a shelter for waiting passengers. Access to the platform is by means of a flight of steps. A toilet building has been step up under the elevated structure.

== Adjacent stations ==
«	Service	»
Asa Line
Rapid: Does not stop at this station
Gomenmachi	Local	Noichi

== Station mascot ==
Each station on the Asa Line features a cartoon mascot character designed by Takashi Yanase, a local cartoonist from Kōchi Prefecture. The mascot for Tateda Station is a girl in a blue flight attendant's uniform named Tateda Sorakochan (たてだ そらこちゃん). A statue of this mascot is located near the steps leading to the platform. The toilet building nearby also shares the aviation theme by having decorative propellers protruding from the roof. This choice of theming is based on the fact that Tateda is near Kōchi Airport.

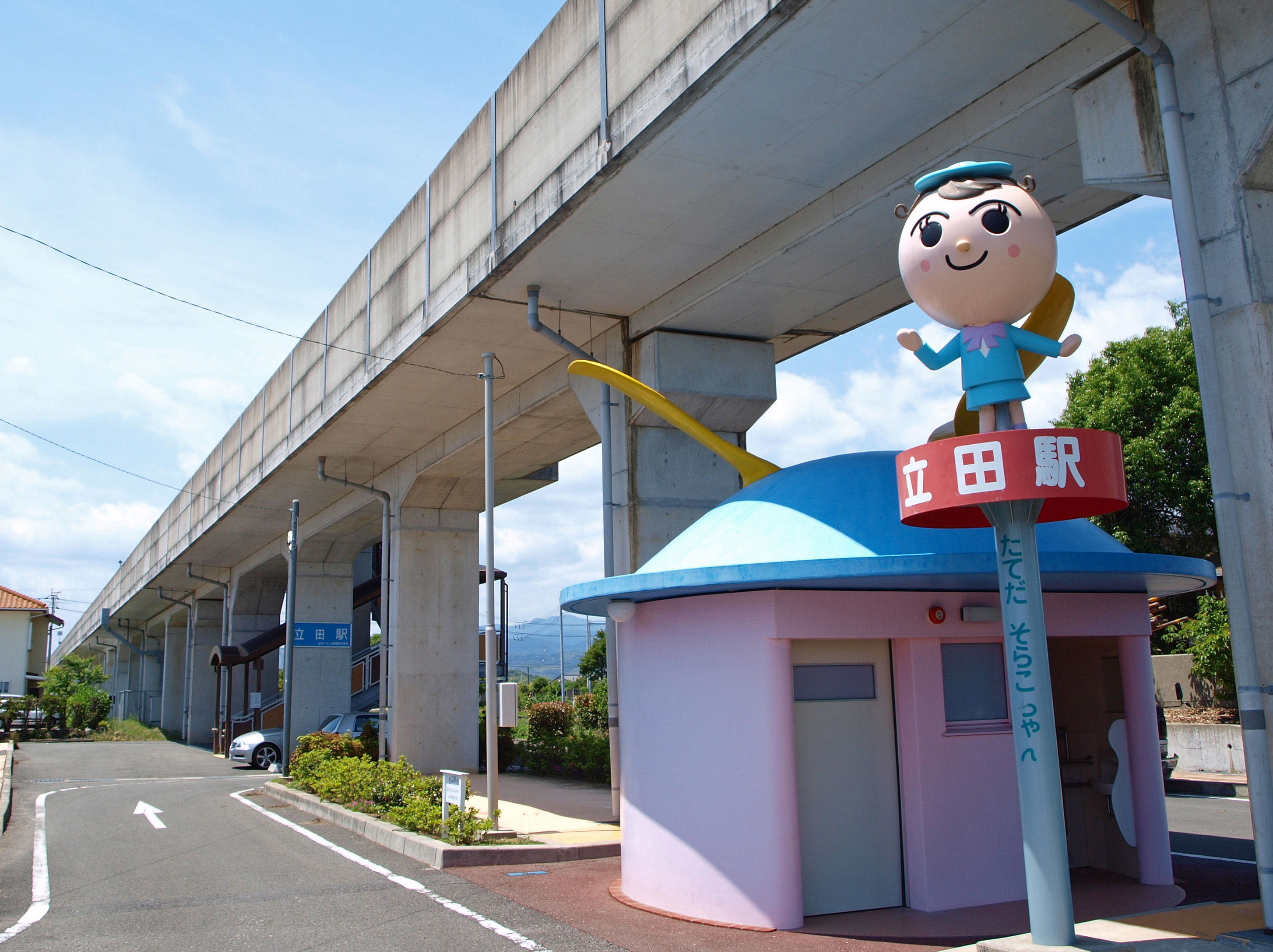
Tateda Station entrance. Note the propellers on the toilet building and the mascot character. The steps leading to the platform are in the background.

== History ==
The train station was opened on 1 July 2002 by the Tosa Kuroshio Railway as an intermediate station on its track from Gomen to Nahari.

== Passenger statistics ==
In fiscal 2011, the station was used by an average of 24 passengers daily.

== Surrounding area ==
- Nankoku Municipal Konan Junior High School
- Nankoku Municipal Nissho Elementary School
- Kochi National College of Technology
- Faculty of Agriculture, Kochi University

== See also ==
- List of railway stations in Japan
