= Yoshikawa Station (Kōchi) =

Railway station in Kōnan, Kōchi Prefecture, Japan

Yoshikawa Station よしかわ駅
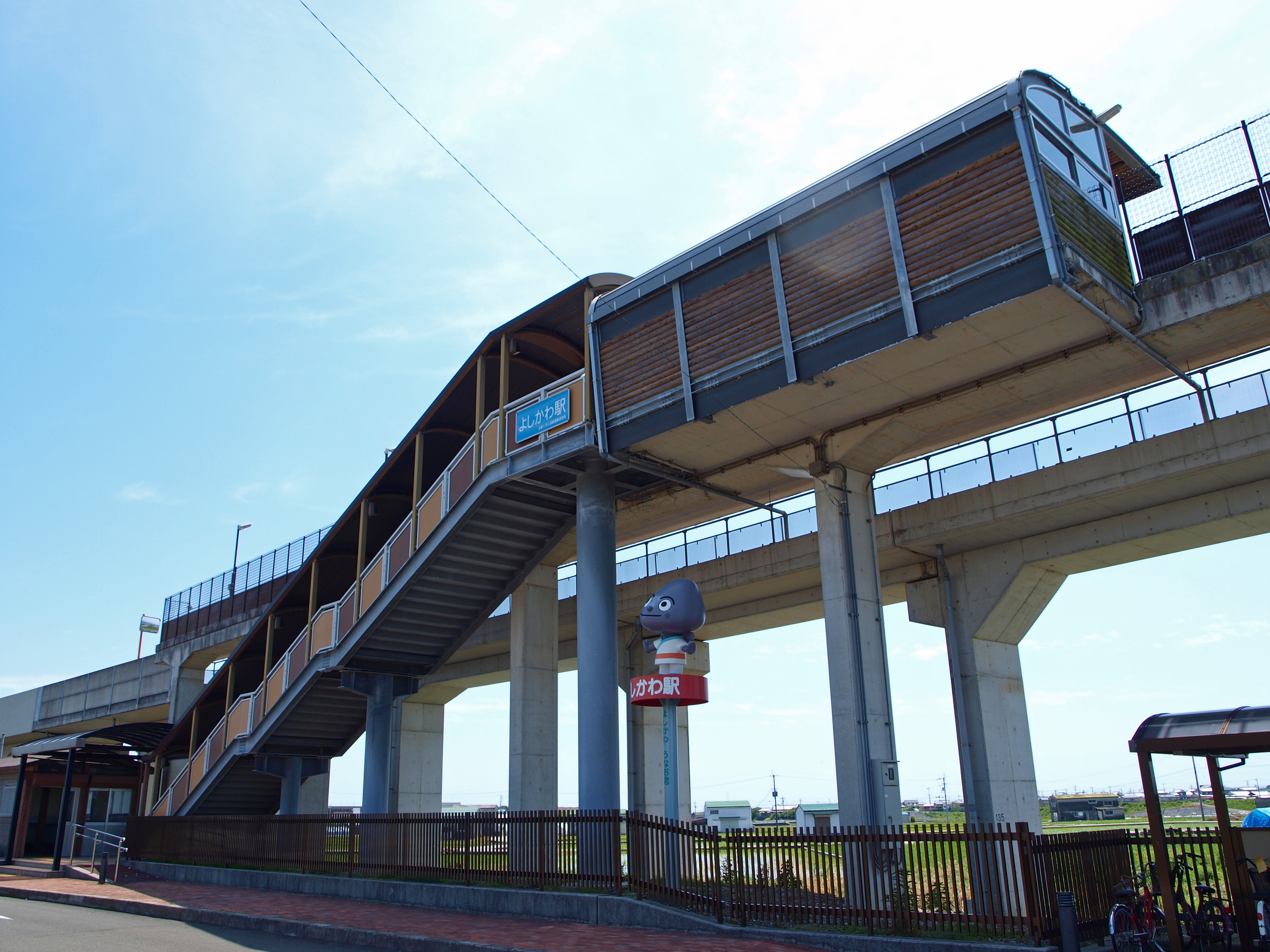
- Yoshikawa Station in 2010

General information
- Location: Yoshikawacho Furukawa, Konan-shi, Kōchi-ken 781-5242; Japan
- Coordinates: 33°32′45″N 133°42′38″E
- Operator: Tosa Kuroshio Railway
- Line: ■ Asa Line
- Distance: 8.0 km from Gomen
- Platforms: 1 side platform
- Tracks: 1

Construction
- Structure type: Elevated

Other information
- Status: Unstaffed
- Station code: GN36

History
- Opened: 1 July 2002

Passengers
- FY2011: 22 daily
Location
- Location within Kochi Prefecture Location within Japan

Yoshikawa Station (よしかわ駅, Yoshikawa-eki) is a passenger railway station located in the city of Kōnan, Kōchi Prefecture, Japan. It is operated by the third-sector Tosa Kuroshio Railway with the station number "GN36".

== Lines ==
The station is served by the Asa Line and is located 8.0 km from the beginning of the line at Gomen. Only local trains stop at the station.

== Layout ==
The station consists of a side platform serving a single elevated track. There is no station building, but an enclosed shelter is provided on the platform. Another waiting room has been set up under the elevated structure. Access to the platform is by a flight of steps. A bike shed is provided nearby.

== Adjacent stations ==
«	Service	»
Asa Line
Rapid: Does not stop at this station
Noichi	Local	Akaoka

== Station mascot ==
Each station on the Asa Line features a cartoon mascot character designed by Takashi Yanase, a local cartoonist from Kōchi Prefecture. The mascot for Yoshikawa Station is an eel in human form named Yoshikawa Uona (よしかわ うなお君), so chosen because eels are a noted product of Yoshikawa.

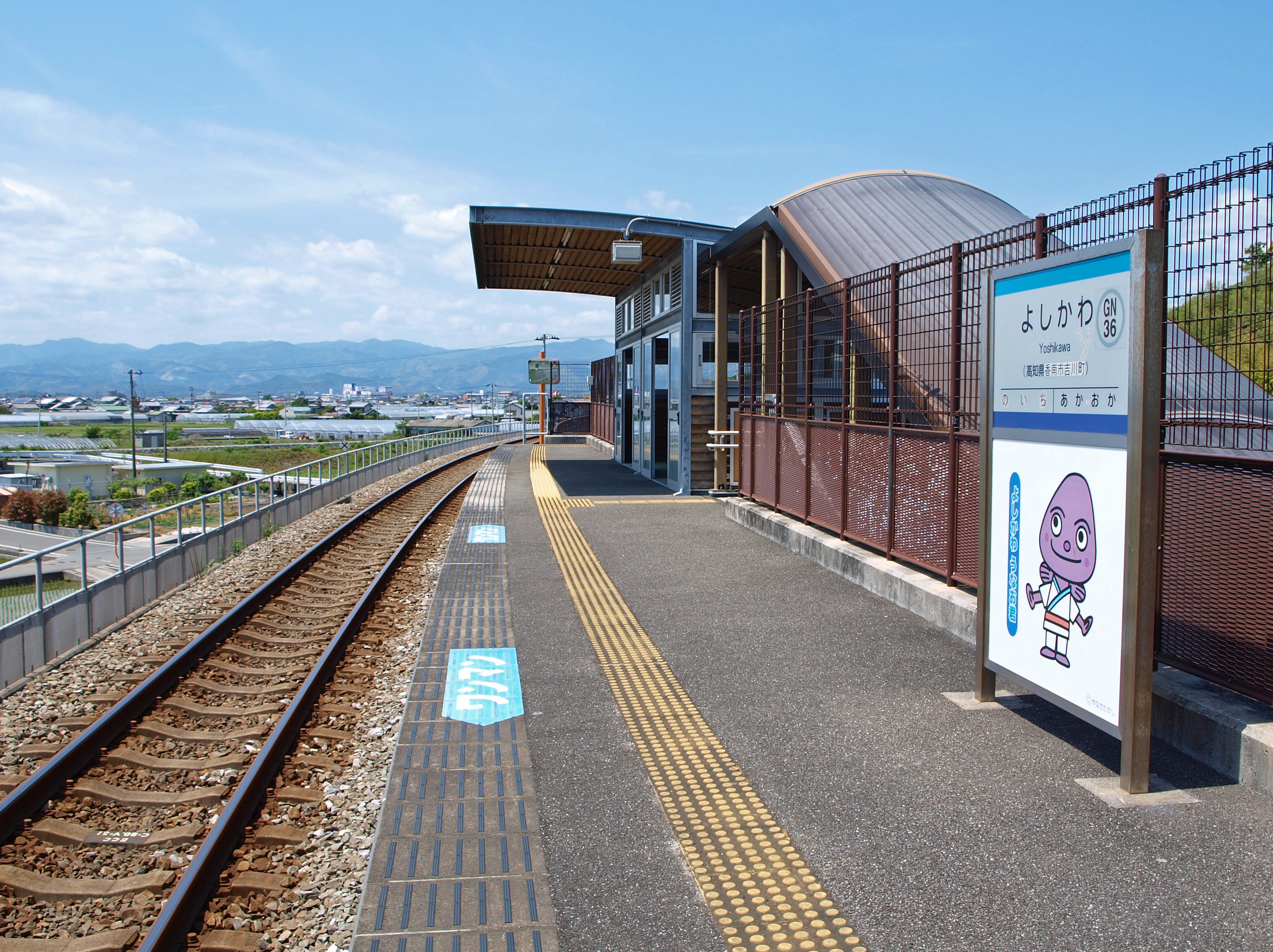
A view of the station platform and track. There is a picture of the station eel mascot character under the station name board.

== History ==
The train station was opened on 1 July 2002 by the Tosa Kuroshio Railway as an intermediate station on its track from Gomen to Nahari.

== Passenger statistics ==
In fiscal 2011, the station was used by an average of 22 passengers daily.

== Surrounding area ==
The station is located in a rural area with few buildings nearby.

== See also ==
- List of railway stations in Japan
