= Kyūjōmae Station (Kōchi) =

Railway station in Aki, Kōchi Prefecture, Japan

Kyūjōmae Station 球場前駅
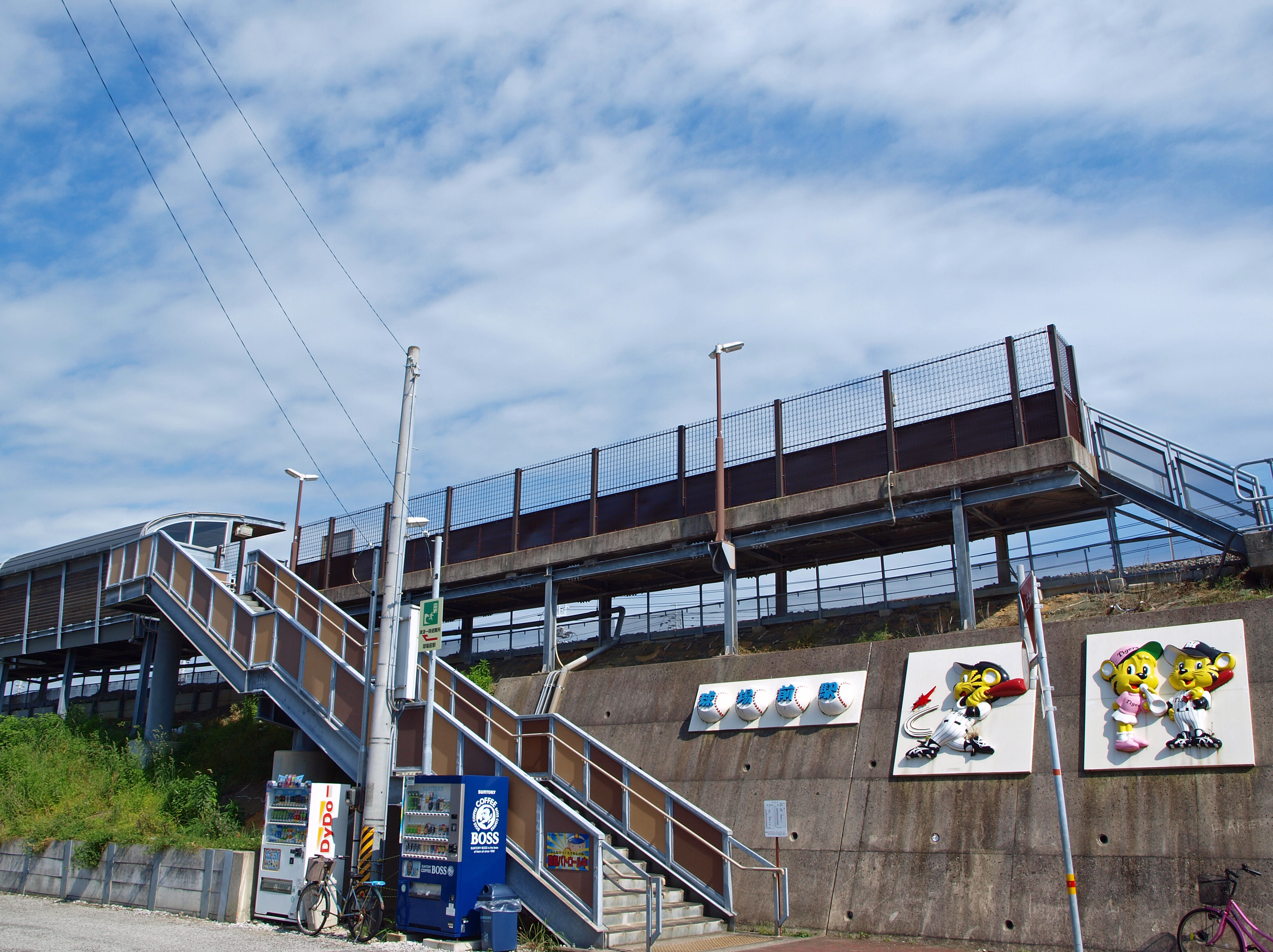
- Kyūjōmae Station entrance in 2010

General information
- Location: Sakuragaokacho, Aki-shi, Kōchi-ken 784-0026; Japan
- Coordinates: 33°30′10″N 133°53′30″E
- Operator: Tosa Kuroshio Railway
- Line: ■ Asa Line
- Distance: 26.2 km from Gomen
- Platforms: 1 side platform
- Tracks: 1

Construction
- Structure type: Embankment
- Parking: Available
- Cycle facilities: Bike shed
- Accessible: No - steps to platform

Other information
- Status: Unstaffed
- Station code: GN28

History
- Opened: 1 July 2002

Passengers
- FY2011: 222 daily
Location
- Location within Kochi Prefecture Location within Japan

Kyūjōmae Station (球場前駅, Kyūjōmae-eki) (literally, in front of the ball-park) is a passenger railway station located in the city of Aki, Kōchi Prefecture, Japan. It is operated by the third-sector Tosa Kuroshio Railway with the station number "GN28".

== Lines ==
The station is served by the Asa Line and is located 26.2 km from the beginning of the line at Gomen. All Asa Line trains, both rapid and local, stop at the station.

== Layout ==
The station consists of a side platform serving a single track on an embankment. There is no station building and the station is unstaffed but a waiting room which comprises both open and enclosed compartments has been set up on the platform. Access to the platform is by means of a flight of steps. A timber waiting room in traditional Japanese architectural style has been set up at the base of the embankment together with a bike shed and parking lots for cars.

== Adjacent stations ==
«	Service	»
Asa Line
Wajiki	Rapid	Aki-Sogo-byoin-mae
Ananai	Local	Aki-Sogo-byoin-mae

== Station mascot ==
Each station on the Asa Line features a cartoon mascot character designed by Takashi Yanase, a local cartoonist from Kōchi Prefecture. The mascot for Kyūjōmae Station is a figure with a baseball for a head dressed in yellow baseball gear with vertical black stripes named Kyūjō Bōru-kun (球場 ボール君). The baseball theme relates to the baseball stadium near to the station.

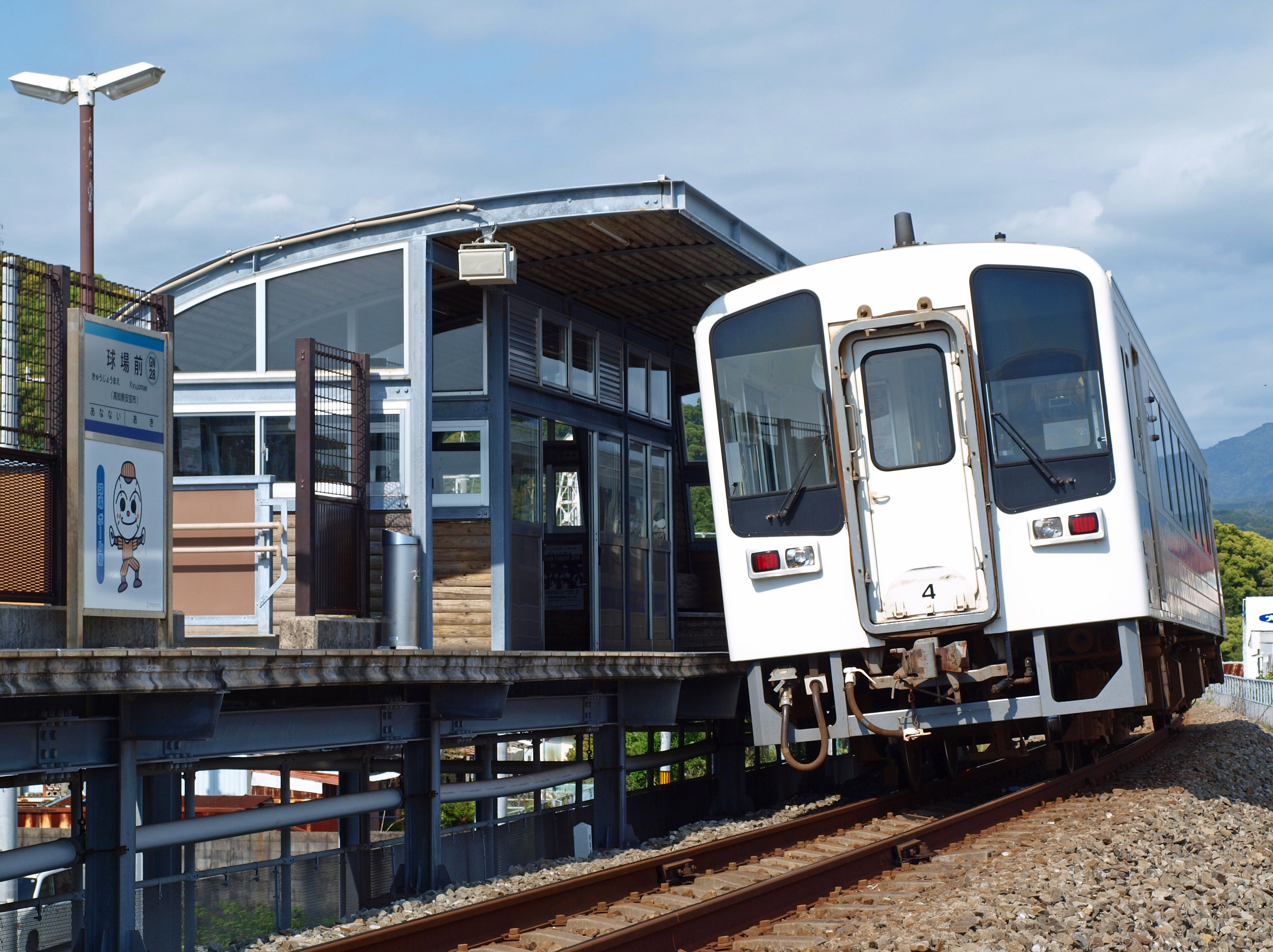
A picture of the mascot can be seen under the station name board.

== History ==
The train station was opened on 1 July 2002 by the Tosa Kuroshio Railway as an intermediate station on its track from Gomen to Nahari.

== Passenger statistics ==
In fiscal 2011, the station was used by an average of 222 passengers daily.

== Surrounding area ==
- Japan National Route 55
- Aki Municipal Stadium
- Aki Multipurpose Gymnasium

== See also ==
- List of railway stations in Japan
