= Kagami Station =

Railway station in Kōnan, Kōchi Prefecture, Japan

Kagami Station 香我美駅
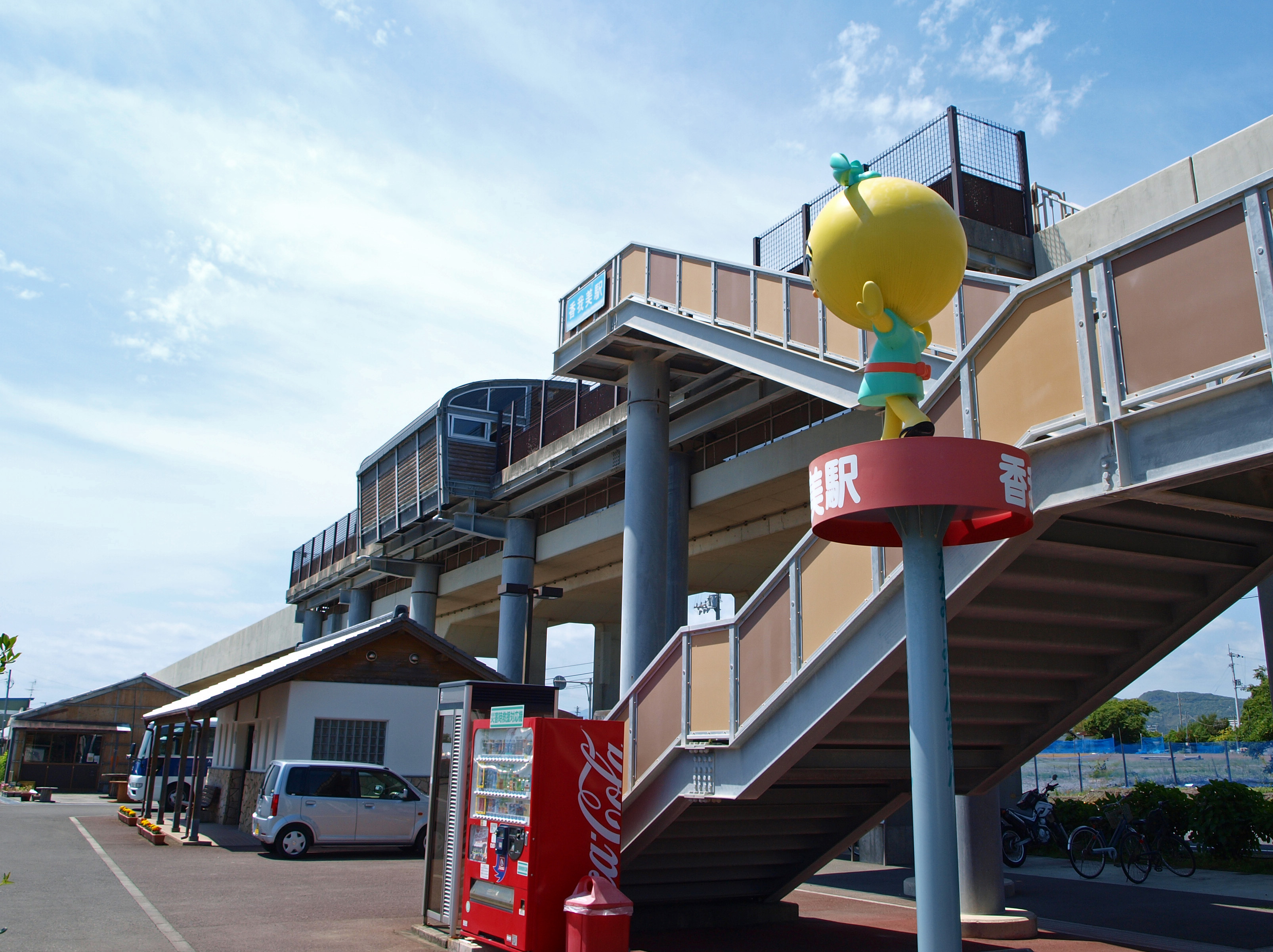
- Kagami Station in 2010

General information
- Location: Kagamicho Kishimoto, Konan-shi, Kōchi-ken 781-5331; Japan
- Coordinates: 33°32′21″N 133°44′15″E
- Operator: Tosa Kuroshio Railway
- Line: ■ Asa Line
- Distance: 10.7 km from Gomen
- Platforms: 1 side platform
- Tracks: 1

Construction
- Structure type: Elevated
- Parking: Available
- Cycle facilities: Bike shed
- Accessible: No - steps lead up to platform

Other information
- Status: Unstaffed
- Station code: GN34

History
- Opened: 1 July 2002

Passengers
- FY2011: 96 daily
Location
- Location within Kochi Prefecture Location within Japan

Kagami Station (香我美駅, Kagami-eki) is a passenger railway station located in the city of Kōnan, Kōchi Prefecture, Japan. It is operated by the third-sector Tosa Kuroshio Railway with the station number "GN34".

== Lines ==
The station is served by the Asa Line and is located 10.7 km from the beginning of the line at Gomen. Only local trains stop at the station.

== Layout ==
The station consists of a side platform serving a single elevated track. There is no station building but an enclosed shelter is provided on the platform for waiting passengers. Access to the platform is by means of a flight of steps. a bike shed is provided underneath the elevated structure.

== Adjacent stations ==
«	Service	»
Asa Line
Rapid: Does not stop at this station
Akaoka	Local	Yasu

== Station mascot ==
Each station on the Asa Line features a cartoon mascot character designed by Takashi Yanase, a local cartoonist from Kōchi Prefecture. The mascot for Kagami Station is a figure with a mandarin orange for a head named Kagami Mikan-chan (かがみ みかんちゃん). The design is chosen because Yamakita Mikan (山北みかん) (Yamakita mandarin oranges) are a specialty product of the area.

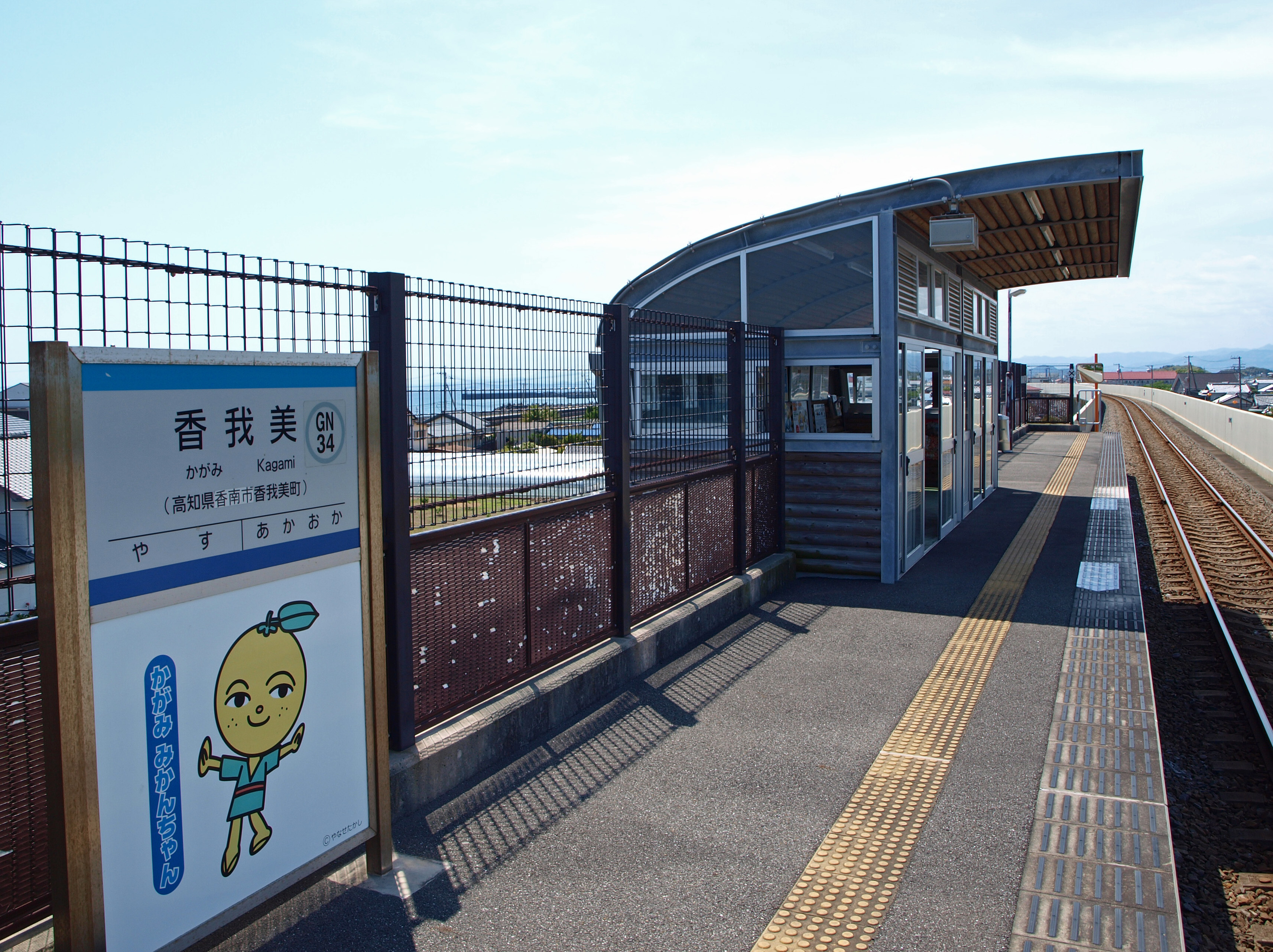
Kagami platform and track. A picture of the mascot can be seen under the station name board.

== History ==
The train station was opened on 1 July 2002 by the Tosa Kuroshio Railway as an intermediate station on its track from Gomen to Nahari.

== Passenger statistics ==
In fiscal 2011, the station was used by an average of 96 passengers daily.

== Surrounding area ==
- Konan City Kagami Government Building (formerly Kagami Town Hall)
- Japan National Route 55

== See also ==
- List of railway stations in Japan
