= Tosa-Ōtsu Station =

Railway station in Kōchi, Japan

Tosa-Ōtsu Station 土佐大津駅
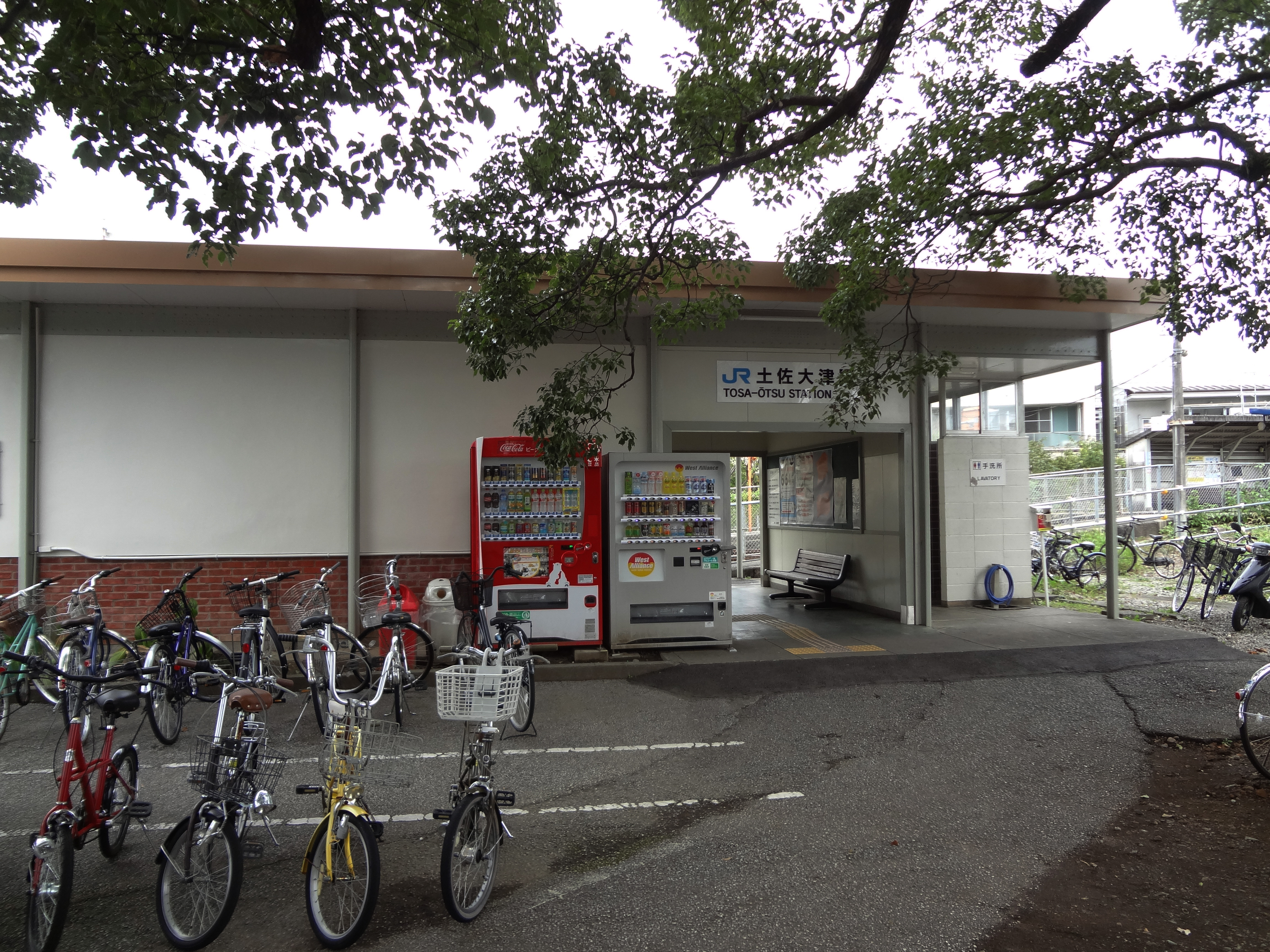
- Tosa-Ōtsu Station in 2012

General information
- Location: Kō Ōtsu, Kōchi-shi, Kōchi-ken 780-0000; Japan
- Coordinates: 33°34′36″N 133°36′43″E
- Operator: JR Shikoku
- Line: ■ Dosan Line
- Distance: 119.4 km from Tadotsu
- Platforms: 2 side platforms
- Tracks: 2

Construction
- Accessible: No - overhead footbridge needed to access one of the platforms

Other information
- Status: unstaffed
- Station code: D41

History
- Opened: 5 December 1925

Passengers
- FY2019: 828
Location
- Location within Kochi Prefecture Location within Japan

Tosa-Ōtsu Station (土佐大津駅, Tosa-Ōtsu-eki) is a passenger railway station located in the city of Kōchi, Kōchi Prefecture, Japan. It is operated by JR Shikoku and has the station number "D41".

== Lines ==
The station is served by the JR Shikoku Dosan Line and is located 119.4 km from the beginning of the line at Tadotsu.

Although Gomen is the official western terminus of the third-sector Tosa Kuroshio Railway Asa Line (also known as the Gomen-Nahari Line), all of its rapid and some local trains continue towards Kōchi on the Dosan Line tracks with Tosa-Ōtsu as one of their intermediate stops.

== Layout ==
Tosa-Ōtsu Station, which is unstaffed, consists of two opposed side platforms serving two tracks. A small building linked to one of the platforms serves as a waiting room. An overhead footbridge connects to the other platform. Weather shelters are provided on both platforms.

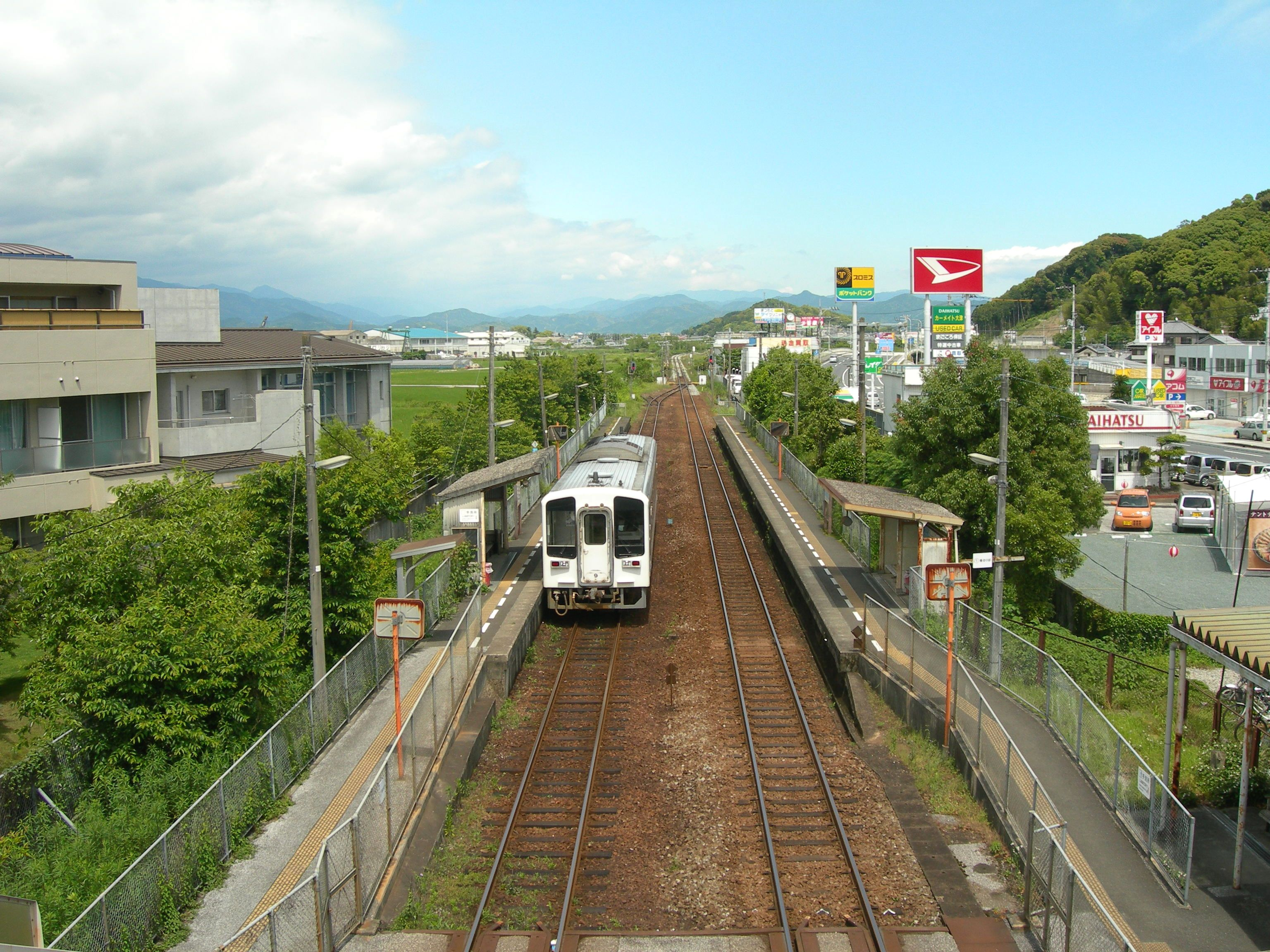
View of the station platforms in 2010. The roof of the station waiting room can just be seen at the extreme right.

== Adjacent stations ==
«	Service	»
Dosan Line
Gomen	-	Nunoshida

== History ==
The station opened on 5 December 1925 as an intermediate stop when the then Kōchi Line (now Dosan Line) was extended from Kōchi eastwards and then northwards towards Tosa-Yamada. At that time the station was operated by Japanese National Railways (JNR). With the privatization of JNR on 1 April 1987, control of the station passed to JR Shikoku.

== Surrounding area ==
- Kochi Prefectural Okatoyo High School
- Seiwa Girls' Junior and Senior High School
- Okō Castle ruins

== See also ==
- List of railway stations in Japan
