= Gomenmachi Station =

Tram station in Nankoku, Kōchi Prefecture, Japan

Gomenmachi Station 後免駅
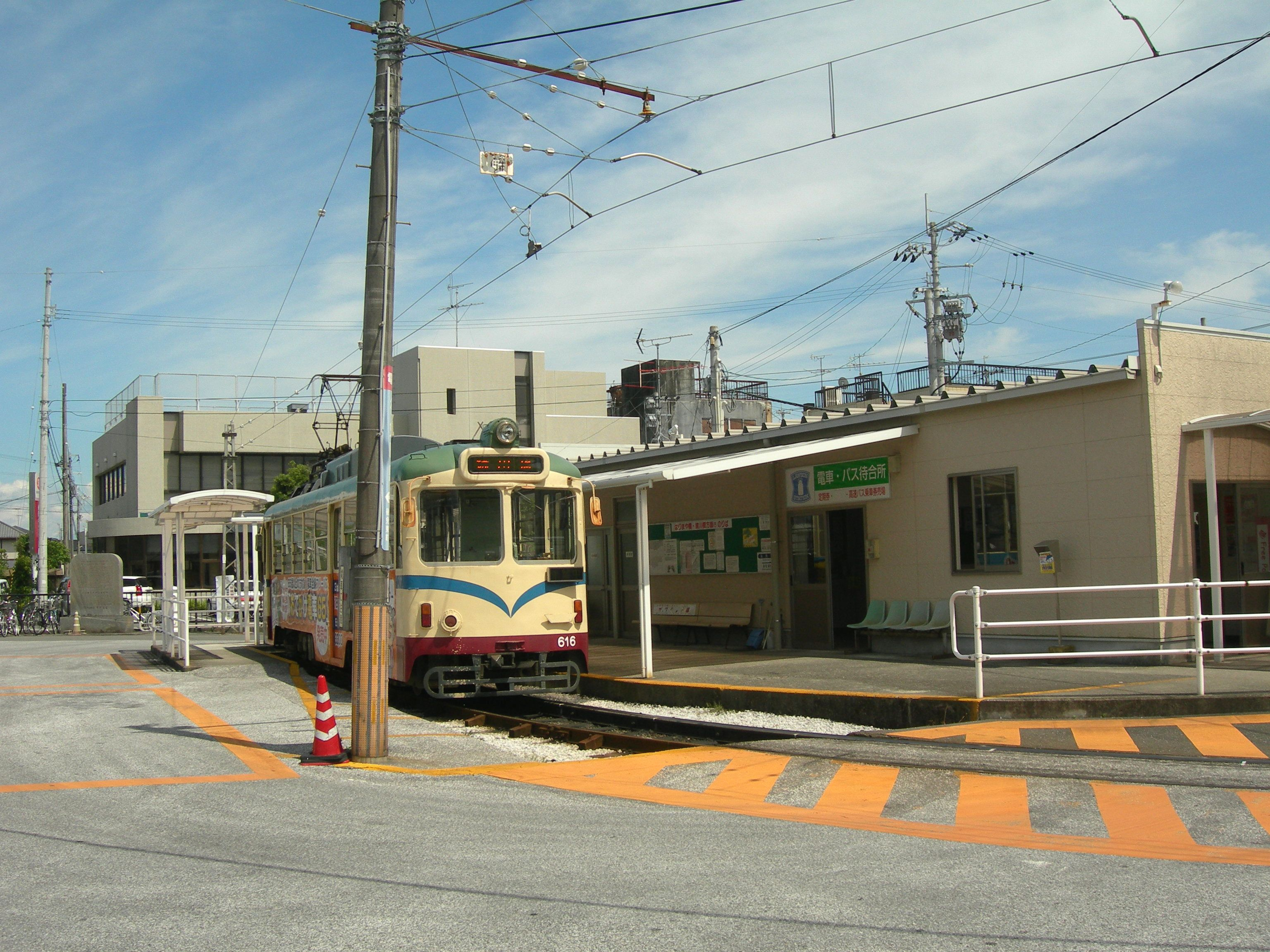
- Tosaden Kōtsū Gomenmachi Station in 2010

General information
- Location: Japan
- Coordinates: 33°34′28″N 133°39′01″E
- Operator: Tosa Kuroshio Railway; Tosaden Kōtsū
- Lines: ■ Asa Line; ■ Gomen Line
- Distance: 10.9 km from Harimayabashi (western terminus)
- Platforms: 2 side platforms
- Tracks: 1

Construction
- Structure type: At grade

History
- Opened: 21 February 1925
- Former names: Gomen-ekimae until 26 July 1974

Passengers
- FY2019: 265 (Asa Line); 921 (tram)
Location
- Location within Kochi Prefecture Location within Japan

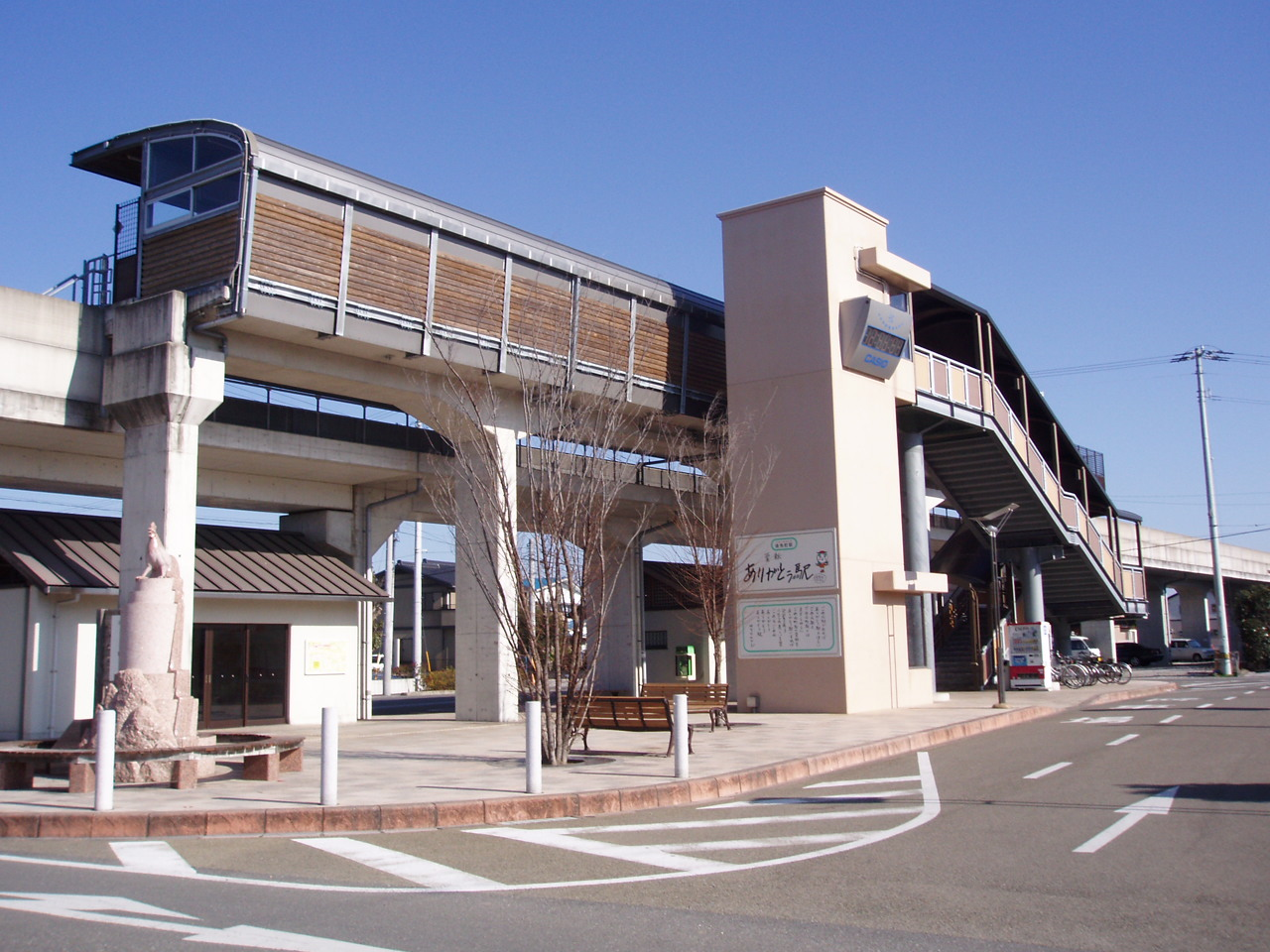
Tosa Kuroshio Railway Gomenmachi Station

Gomenmachi Station (後免町駅, Gomenmachi-eki) is a train and tram station located in the same vicinity in the city of Nankoku, Japan. The train station is operated by the third-sector Tosa Kuroshio Railway with the station number "GN39". The tram station is the eastern terminus of the Gomen Line operated by Tosaden Kōtsū.

== Lines ==
The train station is served by the Asa Line and is located 1.1 km from the beginning of the line at Gomen. All rapid and local trains on the line stop at the station.

The tram station is the eastern terminus of the Tosaden Kōtsū Gomen Line and is located 10.9 km from the western terminus at Harimayabashi.

== Layout ==
The train station consists of a side platform serving a single elevated track. There is no station building but the platform has a shelter for waiting passengers. In addition, there is a traditional style tiled-roof waiting room set up under the elevated structure. Access to the platform is by means of a flight of steps. Bicycle parking is available under the elevated structure and car parking is available at the station forecourt.

The tram station is located at grade in the train station forecourt and at right angles to the railway track.

== Adjacent stations ==
«	Service	»
Tosa Kuroshio Railway
Asa Line
Gomen	Rapid	Noichi
Gomen	Local	Tateda
Tosaden Kōtsū
Gomen Line
Terminus	-	Gomen-higashimachi

== History ==
The train station was opened on 1 July 2002 by the Tosa Kuroshio Railway as an intermediate station on its track from Gomen to Nahari.

The tram station was opened on 21 February 1925 under the name Gomen-ekimae. On 26 July 1974, it was renamed Gomenmachi and moved to its present position from a location further to the west.

== Passenger statistics ==
In fiscal 2011, the train station was used by an average of 326 passengers daily.

== Surrounding area ==
- Nankoku Municipal Gomenoda Elementary School

== See also ==
- List of railway stations in Japan
