= Yasu Station (Kōchi) =

Railway station in Kōnan, Kōchi Prefecture, Japan

Yasu Station 夜須駅
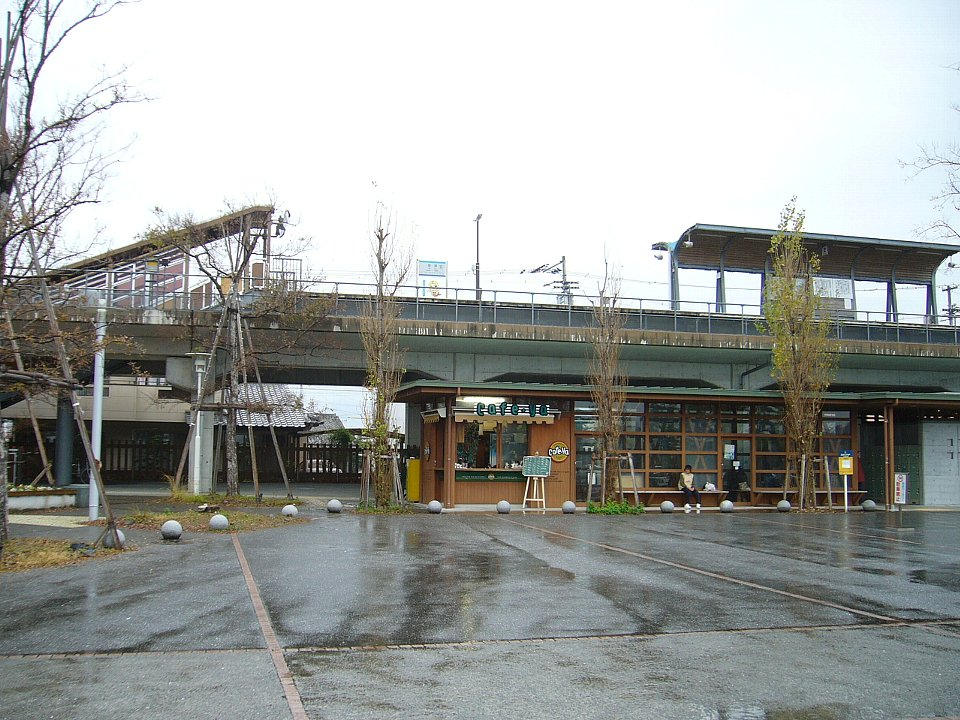
- Yasu Station in 2006

General information
- Location: Yasucho Chigire, Konan-shi, Kōchi-ken 781-5602; Japan
- Coordinates: 33°32′04″N 133°45′16″E
- Operator: Tosa Kuroshio Railway
- Line: ■ Asa Line
- Distance: 12.4 km from Gomen
- Platforms: 1 island platform
- Tracks: 2

Construction
- Structure type: Elevated
- Parking: Available
- Cycle facilities: Designated parking area for bikes
- Accessible: Yes - elevator to platform

Other information
- Status: Unstaffed
- Station code: GN33

History
- Opened: 1 July 2002

Passengers
- FY2011: 234 daily
Location
- Location within Kochi Prefecture Location within Japan

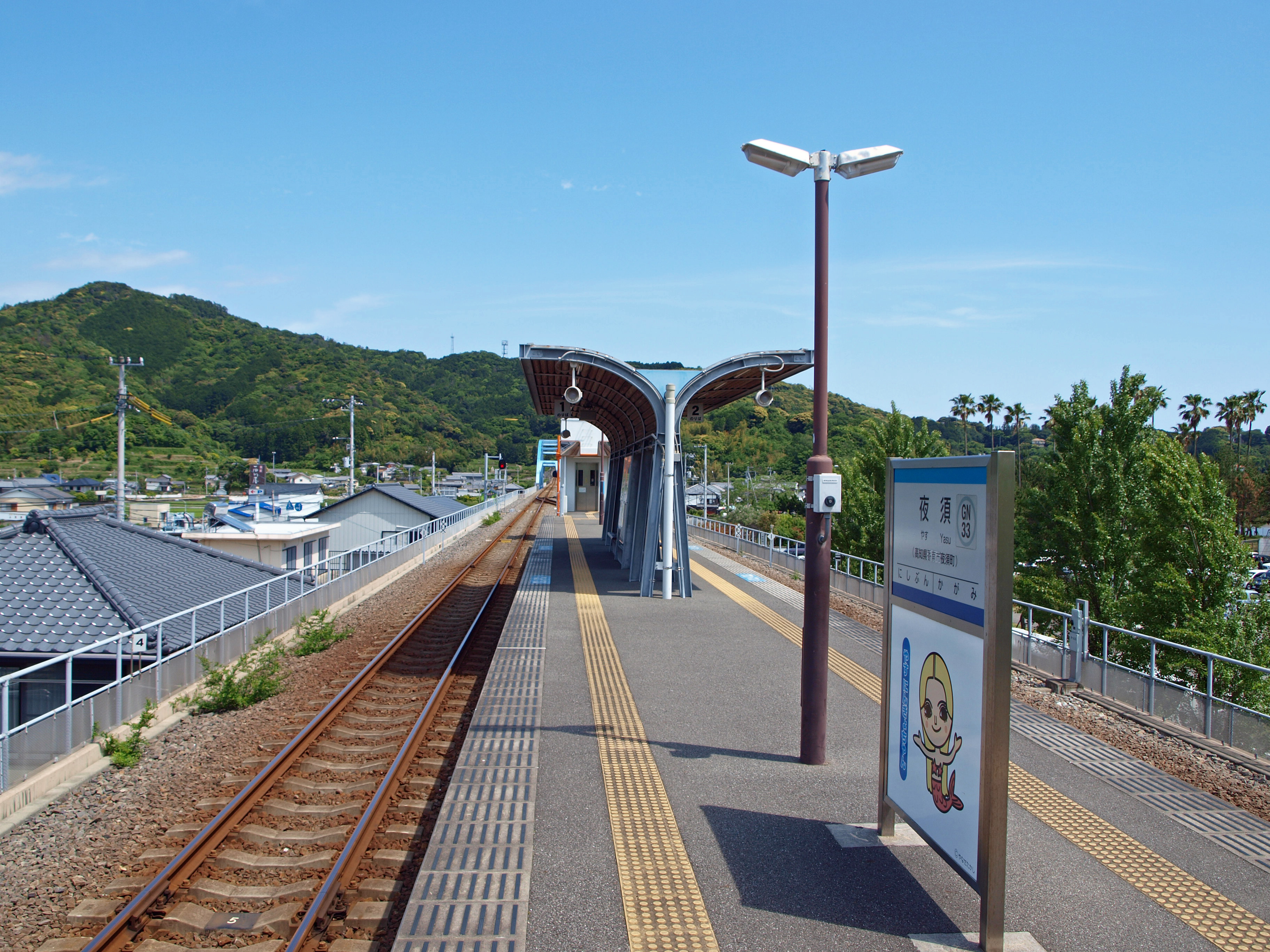
Yasu Station platform, July 2010

Yasu Station (夜須駅, Yasu-eki) is a passenger railway station located in the city of Kōnan, Kōchi Prefecture, Japan. It is operated by the third-sector Tosa Kuroshio Railway with the station number "GN33".

== Lines ==
The station is served by the Asa Line and is located 12.4 km from the beginning of the line at Gomen. All Asa Line trains, both rapid and local, stop at the station.

== Layout ==
The station consists of an island platform serving two elevated tracks. There is no station building only a shelter on the platform for waiting passengers. Benches are also provided on a paved area under the elevated structure as a form of waiting area. Access to the platform is by a flight of steps or an elevator. A designated parking area for bicycles is provided underneath the elevated structure.

== Adjacent stations ==
«	Service	»
Asa Line
Akaoka	Rapid	Wajiki
Kagami	Local	Nishibun

== Station mascot ==
Each station on the Asa Line features a cartoon mascot character designed by Takashi Yanase, a local cartoonist from Kōchi Prefecture. The mascot for Yasu Station is a mermaid named Yasu Ningyo-chan (やす にんぎょちゃん). The design is chosen to recall the "Miss Mermaid Contest" which is held annually at a marine festival at Yasu.

== History ==
The train station was opened on 1 July 2002 by the Tosa Kuroshio Railway as an intermediate station on its track from Gomen to Nahari.

== Passenger statistics ==
In fiscal 2011, the station was used by an average of 234 passengers daily.

== Surrounding area ==
- Konan City Yasu Government Building (former Yasu Town Hall)
- Japan National Route 55

== See also ==
- List of railway stations in Japan
