= Tosa Kuroshio Railway Asa Line =

Railway line in Kochi Prefecture, Japan

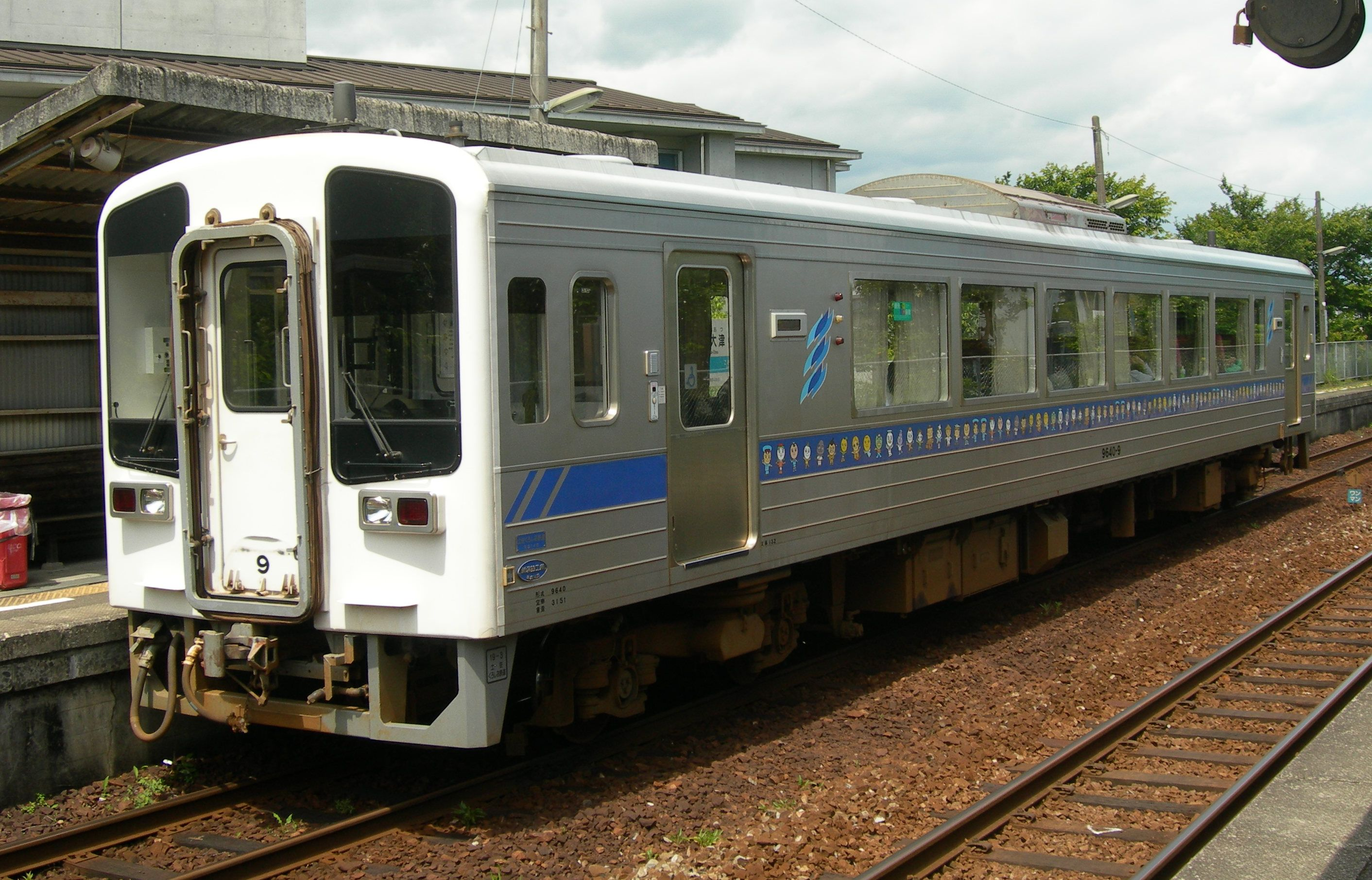
- A 9640 series car on the Asa Line, May 2010

Overview
- Other name: Gomen-Nahari Line
- Native name: 土佐くろしお鉄道阿佐線
- Status: Operational
- Owner: Tosa Kuroshio Railway
- Locale: Kōchi Prefecture
- Termini: Gomen; Nahari
- Stations: 20

Service
- Type: Regional rail
- Operator(s): Tosa Kuroshio Railway
- Rolling stock: 9640 series DMU

History
- Opened: 1 July 2002; 23 years ago

Technical
- Line length: 42.7 km (26.5 mi)
- Number of tracks: Entire line single tracked
- Character: Rural
- Track gauge: 1,067 mm (3 ft 6 in)
- Electrification: None
- Operating speed: 110 km/h (68 mph)

The Tosa Kuroshio Railway Asa Line (土佐くろしお鉄道阿佐線, Tosa Kuroshio Railway Asa-sen) is a 42.7 km Japanese railway line operated by the third-sector railway operator Tosa Kuroshio Railway. It connects Gomen Station in the city of Nankoku with Nahari Station in the city of Nahari in Kōchi Prefecture. The line has the official nickname Gomen-Nahari Line (ごめん・なはり線) which is used on all signage and online information.

== Service outline ==
Limited-stop "Rapid" services and some all-stations "Local" services inter-run over the JR Shikoku Dosan Line to and from Kochi Station. Trains are formed of single or two-car diesel multiple units.

== Stations ==
No.	Name	Japanese	Distance (km)	Rapid	Transfers	Location	
GN40	Gomen	後免	0.0	●	Dosan Line	Nankoku	Kōchi Prefecture
GN39	Gomenmachi	後免町	1.1	●	Tosaden Kōtsū Gomen Line	Nankoku	Kōchi Prefecture
GN38	Tateda	立田	2.9	｜		Nankoku	Kōchi Prefecture
GN37	Noichi	のいち	5.7	●		Kōnan	Kōchi Prefecture
GN36	Yoshikawa	よしかわ	8.0	｜		Kōnan	Kōchi Prefecture
GN35	Akaoka	あかおか	9.3	●		Kōnan	Kōchi Prefecture
GN34	Kagami	香我美	10.7	｜		Kōnan	Kōchi Prefecture
GN33	Yasu	夜須	12.4	●		Kōnan	Kōchi Prefecture
GN32	Nishibun	西分	16.4	▽		Geisei	Kōchi Prefecture
GN31	Wajiki	和食	18.2	●		Geisei	Kōchi Prefecture
GN30	Akano	赤野	19.6	▽		Aki	Kōchi Prefecture
GN29	Ananai	穴内	23.6	▽		Aki	Kōchi Prefecture
GN28	Kyūjōmae	球場前	26.2	●		Aki	Kōchi Prefecture
GN27-1	Aki General Hospital	あき総合病院前	26.8	●		Aki	Kōchi Prefecture
GN27	Aki	安芸	27.7	●		Aki	Kōchi Prefecture
GN26	Ioki	伊尾木	30.4	●		Aki	Kōchi Prefecture
GN25	Shimoyama	下山	34.7	●		Aki	Kōchi Prefecture
GN24	Tōnohama	唐浜	37.0	●		Yasuda	Kōchi Prefecture
GN23	Yasuda	安田	38.7	●		Yasuda	Kōchi Prefecture
GN22	Tano	田野	41.5	●		Tano	Kōchi Prefecture
GN21	Nahari	奈半利	42.7	●		Nahari	Kōchi Prefecture

== Rolling stock ==
A fleet of 11 9640 series ("9640" can be read as "Kuroshio" in Japanese) stainless steel-bodied diesel multiple unit cars are used on the line, including two cars, 9640-1S and 9640-2S with rounded front ends in a whale motif and an open observation balcony on one side.

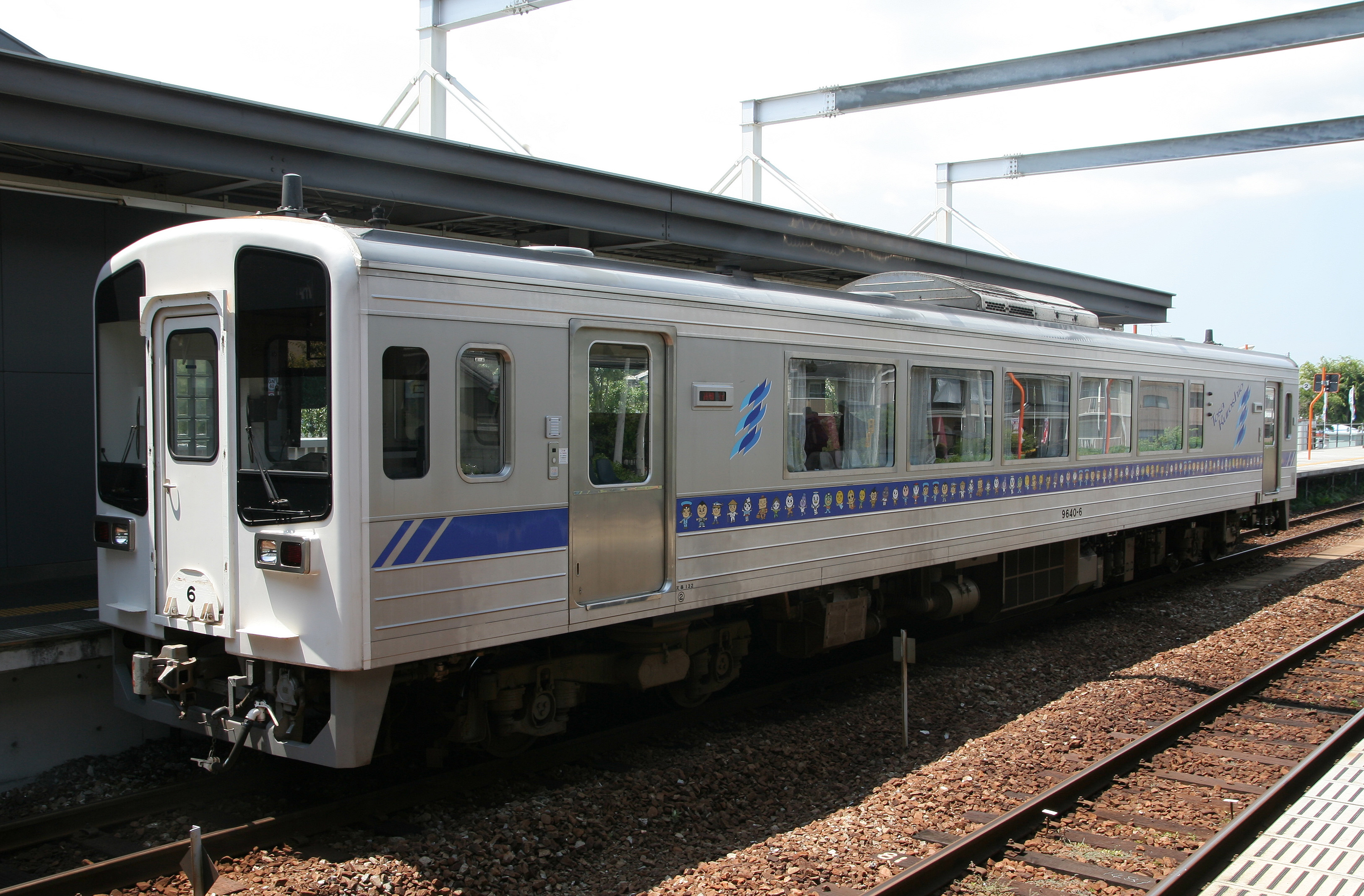
9640 series car 9640-6

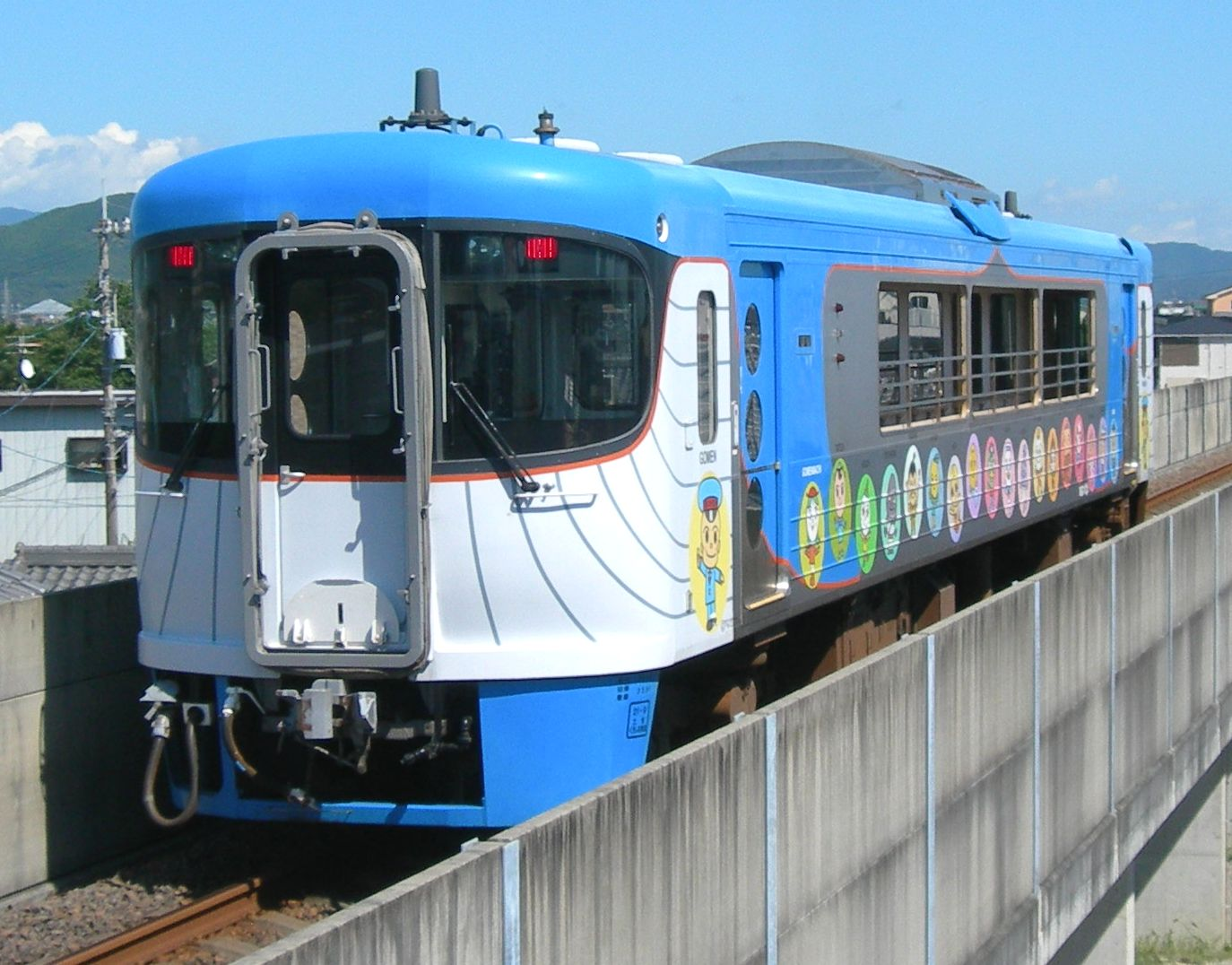
9640 series car 9640-1S

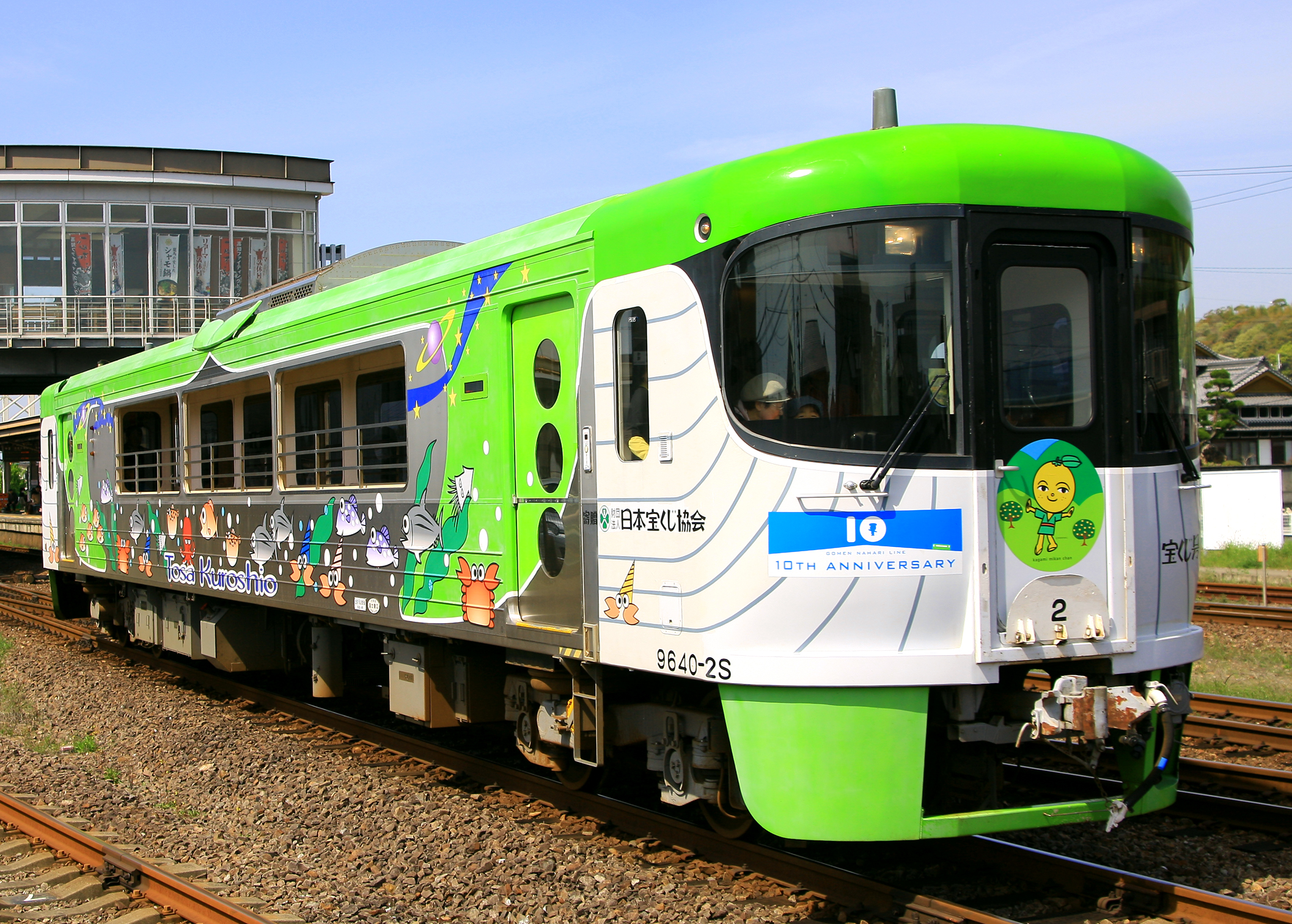
9640 series car 9640-2S

== History ==
The Tosa Kuroshio Tetsudo was established on 8 May 1986 for the purpose of resuming construction of the Sukumo and Asa lines, which had been planned by Japanese National Railways but abandoned. The company acquired a license to operate the Asa Line in January 1988, and commenced construction of the line, which opened on 1 July 2002.

== See also ==
- List of railway lines in Japan
