= Gomen Station =

Railway station in Nankoku, Kōchi Prefecture, Japan

D40 Gomen Station 後免駅
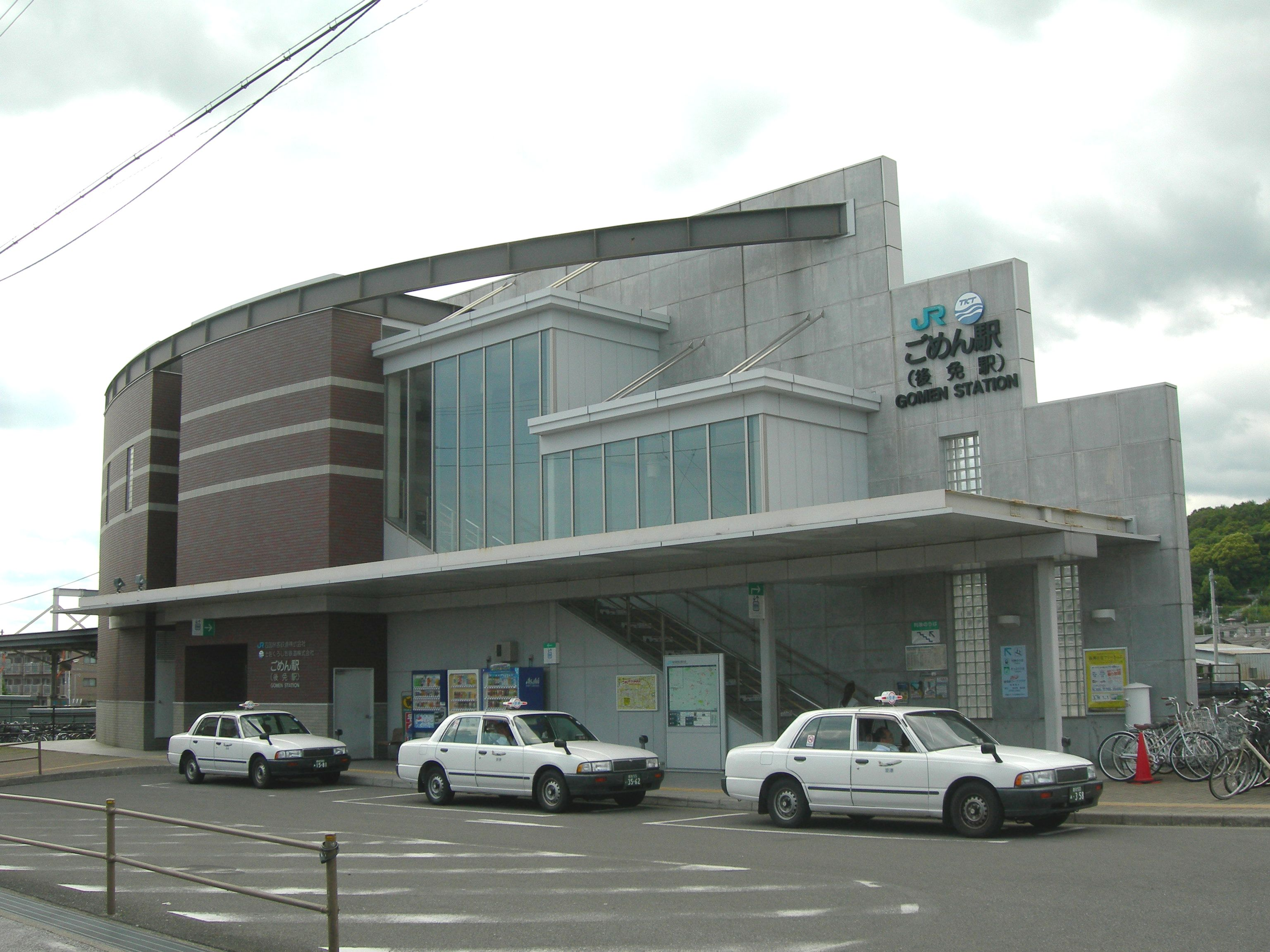
- Gomen Station in 2010

General information
- Location: 2-4 Ekimaechō, Nankoku-shi, Kōchi-ken 783-0002; Japan
- Coordinates: 33°34′45″N 133°38′43″E
- Operator: JR Shikoku; Tosa Kuroshio Railway
- Lines: Dosan Line; ■ Asa Line
- Distance: 116.2 km (72.2 mi) from Tadotsu (start of the Dosan Line)
- Platforms: 2 island platforms
- Tracks: 4 + 1 passing loop

Construction
- Structure type: At grade
- Parking: Available
- Cycle facilities: Designated parking area for bicycles
- Accessible: Yes - elevators to all platforms

Other information
- Status: Staffed - JR Shikoku ticket window (Midori no Madoguchi)
- Station code: D40, GN40
- Website: Official website

History
- Opened: 5 December 1925; 100 years ago

Passengers
- FY2023: 1,864 daily

Services
Preceding station	JR Shikoku	Following station
Tosa-Ōtsu D41 towards Kubokawa	Dosan Line	Tosa-Nagaoka D39 towards Tadotsu
Location
- Location within Kochi Prefecture Location within Japan

Gomen Station (後免駅, Gomen-eki) is a junction passenger railway station located in the city of Nankoku, Kōchi Prefecture, Japan. The station is operated by JR Shikoku for its Dosan Line with the station number "D40" and by the third-sector Tosa Kuroshio Railway for its Asa Line with the station number "GN40".

== Lines ==
The station is served by the Dosan Line and is located 116.2 km from the beginning of the line at Tadotsu. Besides the local trains of the Dosan Line, the following JR limited express services also stop at Gomen Station:

- Nanpū - Okayama to Kōchi, Nakamura and Sukumo
- Shimanto - Takamatsu to Kōchi, Nakamura and Sukumo
- Ashizuri - Kōchi to Nakamura and Sukumo

In addition the station is the start point and western terminus of the Asa Line (also known as the Gomen-Nahari Line). However, all its rapid and some local trains continue westwards to end at Kōchi using the Dosan Line tracks.

== Layout ==
The station consists of two island platforms serving four tracks. Track/platform 0 (a siding) and track/platform 1 (bidirectional) is used by Asa Line trains while tracks/platforms 2 and 3 (both bidirectional) are used by Dosan Line trains. A passing loop runs alongside track 3.

The present station building is an elevated structure where passenger facilities are located on a bridge which spans the tracks. The station entrance is on the south side of the tracks from where elevators and stairs lead to the bridge structure on level 2 which houses ticket gates, a waiting area and a JR ticket window (with a Midori no Madoguchi staffed ticket office) and a JR travel centre (Warp Plaza). From the bridge, separate stairs and elevators connect to all platforms. The bridge also connects to a second station entrance from road on the north side of the tracks.

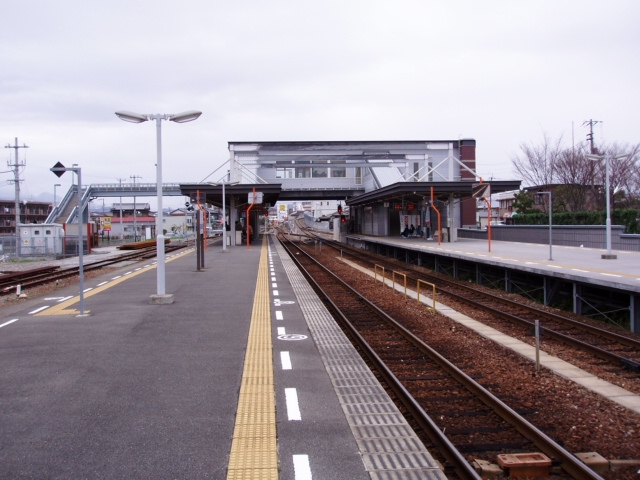
A view of the station platforms and tracks looking east. Note the hashigami station building across the tracks. Note also how track 1 (to the right) and track 0 (in the far distance) merge and then slope up towards Gomenmachi.

== Adjacent stations ==
«	Service	»
JR Limited Express Services
Tosa-Yamada	Nanpū	Kōchi
Tosa-Yamada	Shimanto	Kōchi
Tosa-Yamada	Ashizuri	Kōchi
Asa Line
Tosa-Ōtsu	Rapid	Gomenmachi
Tosa-Ōtsu	Local	Gomenmachi

== History ==
The station opened on 5 December 1925 as an intermediate stop when the then Kōchi Line (now Dosan Line) was extended from Kōchi eastwards and then northwards towards Tosa-Yamada. At that time the station was operated by Japanese Government Railways (JGR). On 1 April 1987, Japanese National Railways (JNR), the successor of JGR, was privatised and control of the station passed to JR Shikoku.

On 1 July 2002, the Tosa Kuroshio Railway completed its track to Nahari and operations commenced on the Asa Line with Gomen as the official start point.

== Surrounding area ==
- Kochi Prefectural Kochi East Technical High School
- Kochi Prefectural Kochi Agricultural High School
- Nankoku Municipal Gomenoda Elementary School
- Nankoku City Nagaoka Elementary School

== See also ==
- List of railway stations in Japan
