= Ōkawa, Kōchi =

Ōkawa 大川村
- Village
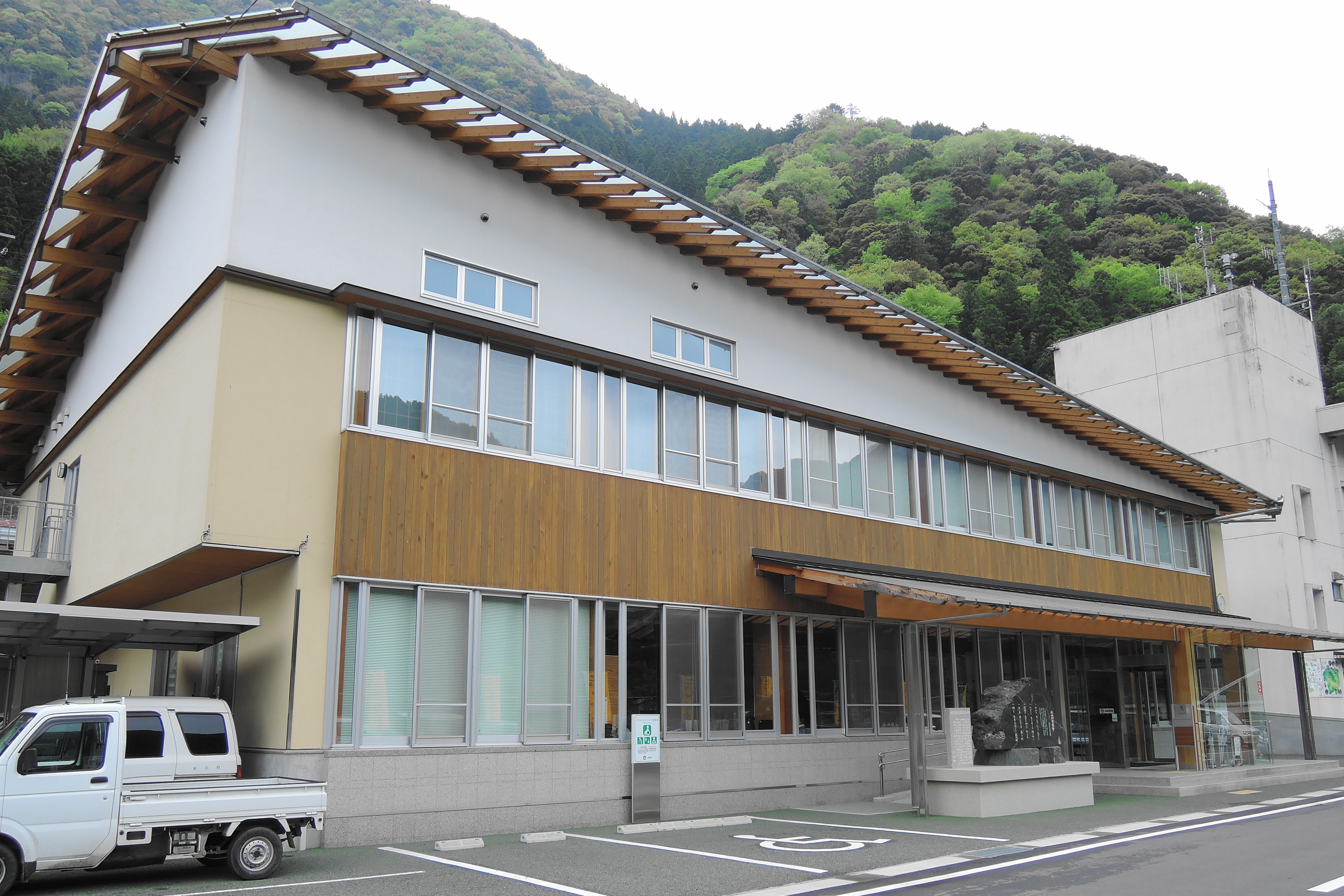
- Okawa village hall

- Flag Seal
- Location of Ōkawa in Kōchi Prefecture

- Location in Japan
- Coordinates: 33°47′N 133°28′E
- Country: Japan
- Region: Shikoku
- Prefecture: Kōchi
- District: Tosa

Area
  - Total: 95.27 km^{2} (36.78 sq mi)

Population (January 31, 2023)
  - Total: 352
  - Density: 3.69/km^{2} (9.57/sq mi)
- Time zone: UTC+09:00 (JST)
- City hall address: 27-1 Komatsu, Ōkawa-mura, Tosa-gun, Kōchi-ken 781-3703
- Website: www.vill.okawa.kochi.jp
- Symbols
- Bird: Blue-and-white flycatcher
- Flower: Bigleaf hydrangea
- Tree: Five-needle pine

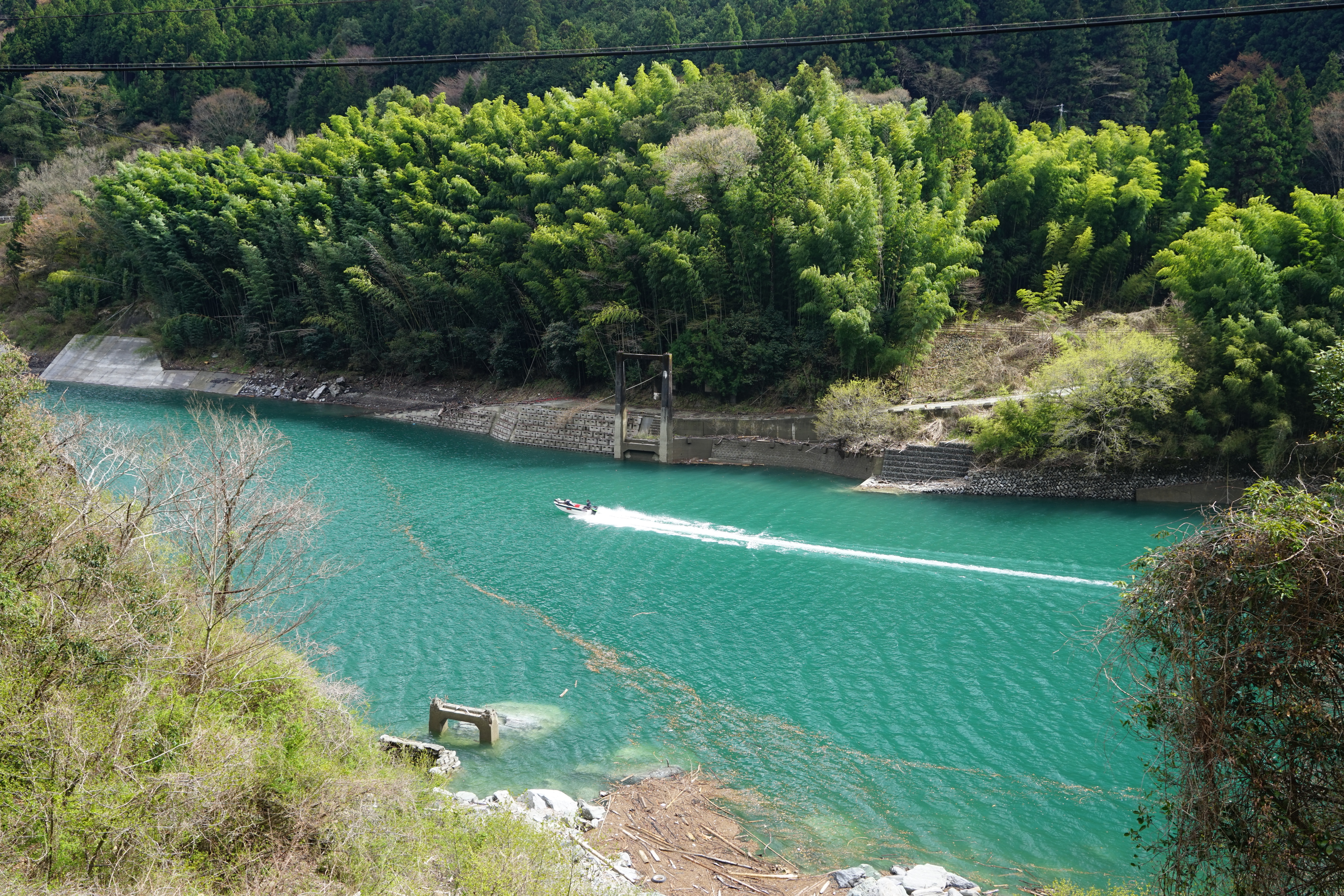
Sameura Dam reservoir

Ōkawa (大川村, Ōkawa-mura) is a village located in Tosa District, Kōchi Prefecture, Japan. As of 31 January 2023, the village had an estimated population of 352 in 209 households and a population density of 3.7 persons per km^{2}. The total area of the village is 95.27 square kilometres (36.78 sq mi).

== Geography ==
Ōkawa is located in the Shikoku Mountains in the northern part of Kochi Prefecture, bordering Ehime. The Yoshino River flows through the village from west to east. The former center of the village was submerged due to the completion and flooding of the Sameura Dam, located in nearby Motoyama. Currently, the Komatsu area on the shore of the dam lake has the village office.

=== Neighbouring municipalities ===
Ehime Prefecture

- Niihama
- Shikokuchūō

Kōchi Prefecture

- Ino
- Tosa (town)

=== Climate ===
Ōkawa has a humid subtropical climate (Köppen Cfa) characterized by warm summers and cool winters with light snowfall. The average annual temperature in Ōkawa is 11.3 °C. The average annual rainfall is 2536 mm with September as the wettest month. The temperatures are highest on average in January, at around 22.4 °C, and lowest in January, at around 0.0 °C.

== Demographics ==
Per Japanese census data, the population of Ōkawa peaked around 1960 but dropped precipitously in the decades afterwards after the completion of the Sameura Dam flooded the main inhabited portion of the village. Since then, Ōkawa's population has continued to age and decline.

Historical population
Year	Pop.	±%
1920	3,054	—
1930	3,398	+11.3%
1940	4,100	+20.7%
1950	3,821	−6.8%
1960	4,114	+7.7%
1970	1,900	−53.8%
1980	906	−52.3%
1990	758	−16.3%
2000	569	−24.9%
2010	411	−27.8%
2020	366	−10.9%

== History ==
As with all of Kōchi Prefecture, the area of Ōkawa was part of ancient Tosa Province. During the Edo period, the area was part of the holdings of Tosa Domain ruled by the Yamauchi clan from their seat at Kōchi Castle. The village of Ōkawa was established with the creation of the modern municipalities system on October 1, 1889. In the late 20th century, large parts of the built-up area of the town were submerged following the completion of the Sameura Dam.

== Government ==
Ōkawa has a mayor-council form of government with a directly elected mayor and a unicameral village council of six members. Ōkawa, together with the other municipalities of Tosa District and Nagaoka District, contributes one member to the Kōchi Prefectural Assembly. In terms of national politics, the village is part of Kōchi 1st district of the lower house of the Diet of Japan.

== Economy ==
The major industry in Ōkawa village is logging; much of the town's mountains have been converted into a cedar tree farm. Additionally, the Shirataki copper mine (白滝鉱山) located in Ōkawa was in operation between 1919 and 1985.

== Education ==
Ōkawa has one public combined elementary/middle school operated by the village government. The village does not have a high school. There is also a nature center which runs summer camps and a study abroad program which offers Japanese youths the opportunity to live in this very remote mountain village and attend the local elementary and/or junior high schools.

== Transportation ==
=== Railway ===
Ōkawa has no passenger railway service. The nearest station is Ōsugi Station on the JR Shikoku Dosan Line; however, most passengers travel to Kōchi Station by bus.

=== Highways ===
Ōkawa is not on any national highway.

== Local attractions ==
Ōkawa is regionally famous for its Black Beef cows and the annual Ōkawa Black Beef Festival (大川村謝肉祭 Shanikusai, lit. 'Beef Gratitude Festival') has been known to draw up to 1,500 people from around Shikoku and Honshu.

There are also a few hiking trails located in the region that reward travelers with beautiful views of Shikoku.
