= Inamura =

Inamura may refer to:

- Inamura (surname), a Japanese surname
- Mount Inamura, a mountain of Kōchi Prefecture, Japan
- Inamura Dam, a dam in Tosa, Kōchi Prefecture, Japan
