= Tosa, Kōchi (town) =

Tosa 土佐町
- Town
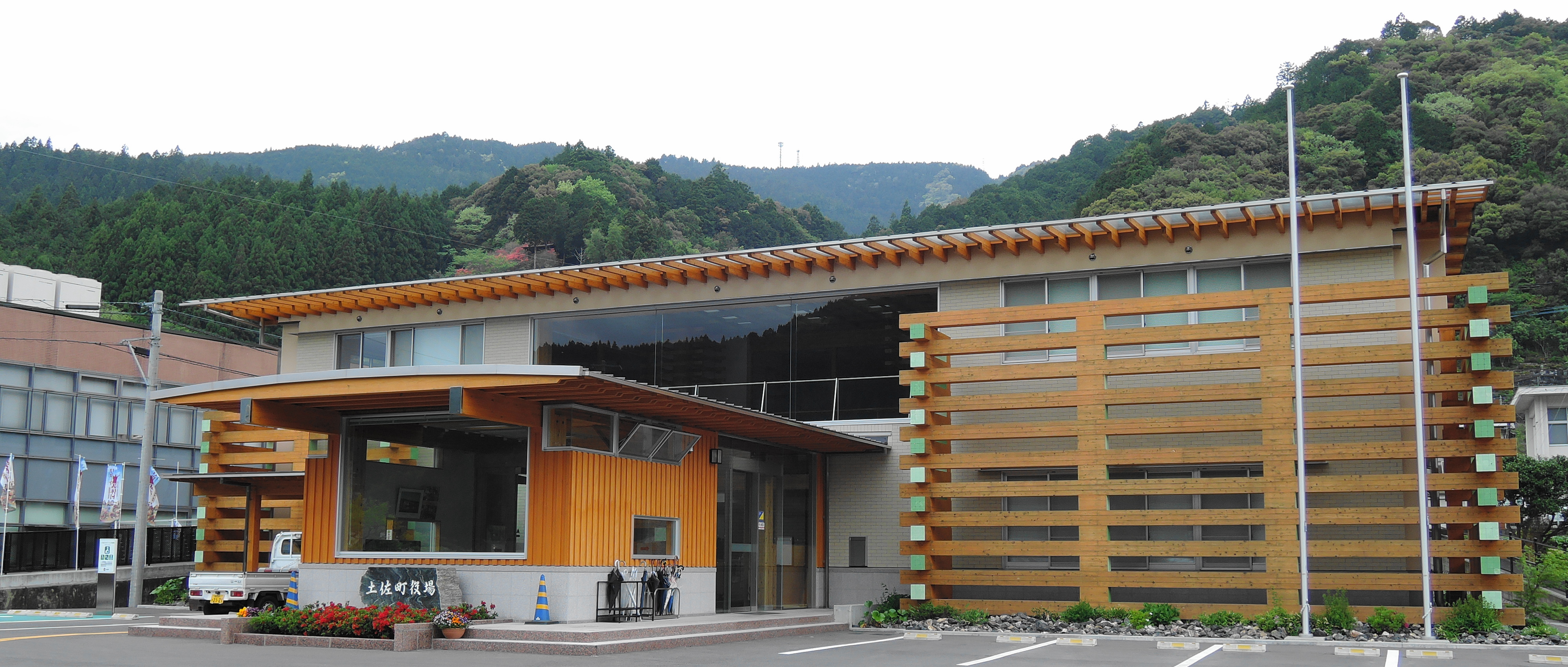
- Tosa town hall

- Flag Chapter
- Location of Tosa in Kōchi Prefecture

- Location in Japan
- Coordinates: 33°44′N 133°32′E
- Country: Japan
- Region: Shikoku
- Prefecture: Kōchi
- District: Tosa

Area
  - Total: 212.13 km^{2} (81.90 sq mi)

Population (May 30, 2022)
  - Total: 3,670
  - Density: 17.3/km^{2} (44.8/sq mi)
- Time zone: UTC+09:00 (JST)
- City hall address: 194 Doi, Tosa-chō, Tosa-gun, Kōchi-ken 781-3401
- Website: Official website
- Symbols
- Bird: Blue-and-white flycatcher
- Flower: Hydrangea
- Tree: Cryptomeria

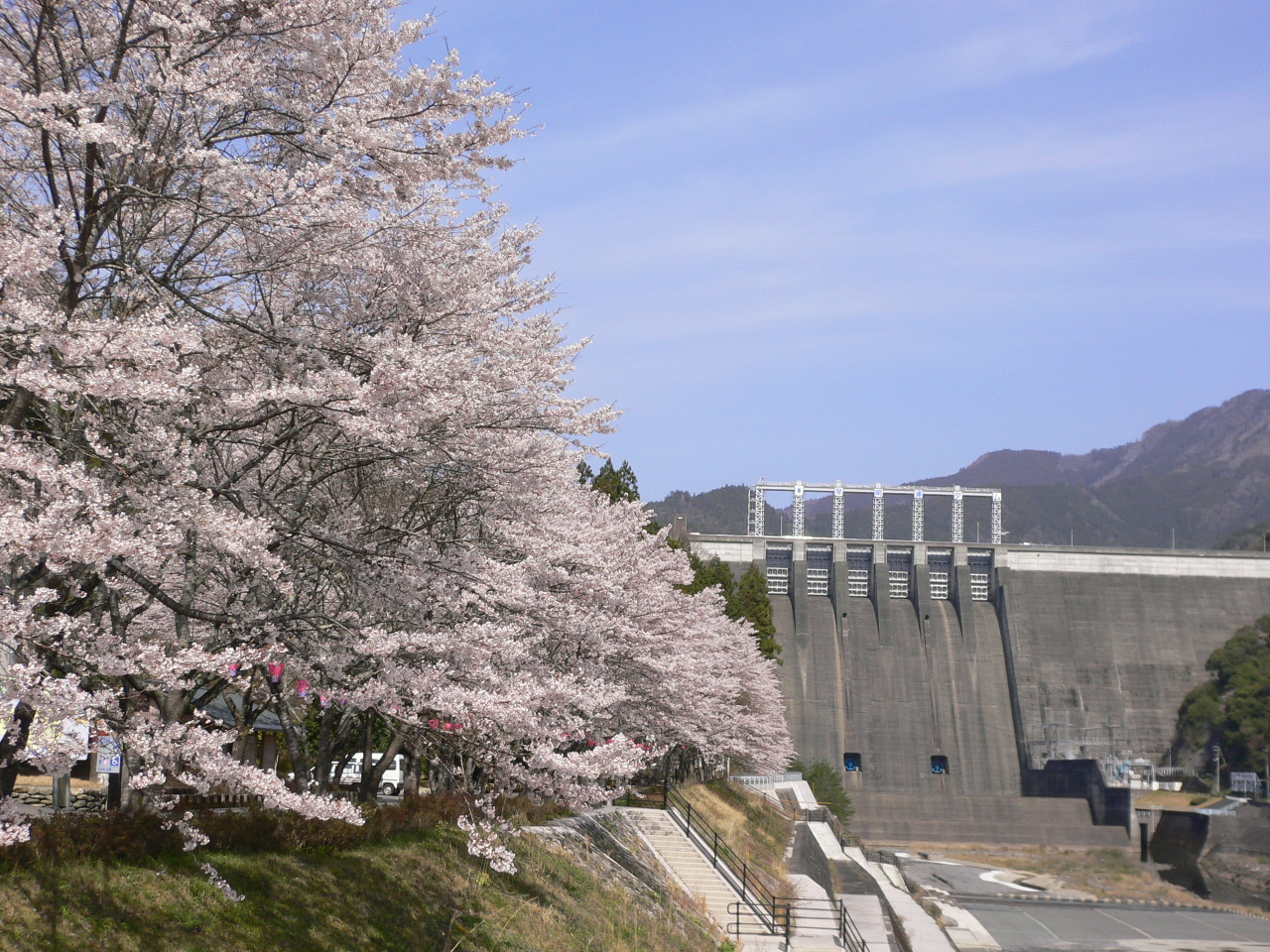
Sameura Dam

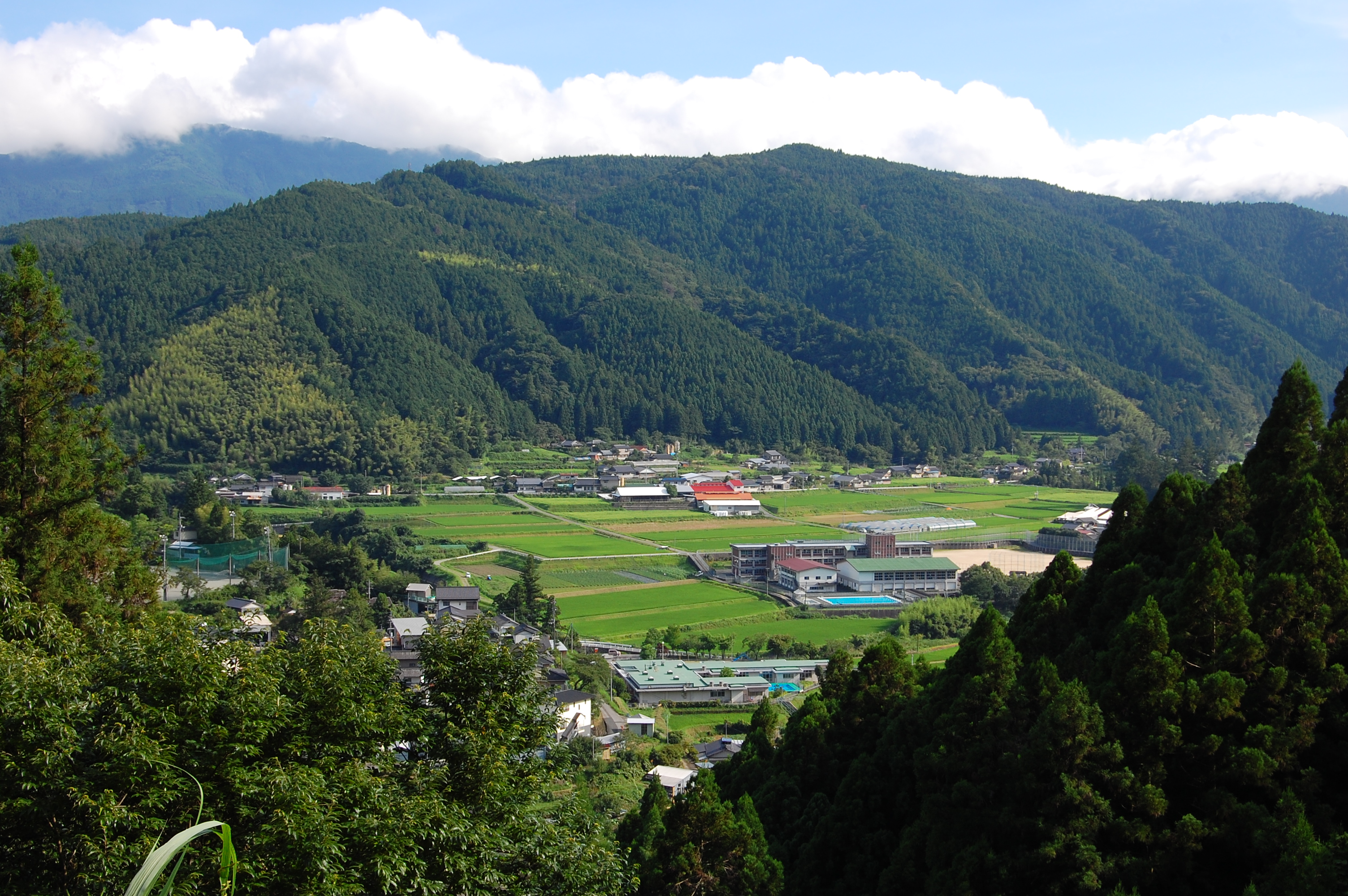
Panorama of Tosa

Tosa (土佐町, Tosa-chō) is a town located in Tosa District, Kōchi Prefecture, Japan. As of 30 May 2022, the town had an estimated population of 3,670 in 1,908 households and a population density of 17 people per km^{2}. The total area of the town is 212.13 square kilometres (81.90 sq mi).

== Geography ==
Tosa is located in the Shikoku Mountains in central northern Kochi Prefecture, bordering Ehime. The Yoshino River flows through the town with the Sameura Dam located near its headwaters. Approximately 85% of the town is forest with an elevation of 300 to 500 meters above sea level. Inamurayama, the highest mountain is 1,506 meters.

=== Neighbouring municipalities ===
Ehime Prefecture

- Shikokuchūō

Kōchi Prefecture

- Ino
- Kōchi
- Motoyama
- Nankoku
- Ōkawa

=== Climate ===
Tosa has a humid subtropical climate (Köppen Cfa) characterized by warm summers and cool winters with light snowfall. The average annual temperature in Tosa is 13.7 °C. The average annual rainfall is 2536 mm with September as the wettest month. The temperatures are highest on average in January, at around 22.4 °C, and lowest in January, at around 2.9 °C.

== Demographics ==
Per Japanese census data, the population of Tosa has been declining, and is now less than half of what it was in 1960.

Historical population
| Year | Pop. | ±% |
|---|---|---|
| 1960 | 9,440 | — |
| 1970 | 8,099 | −14.2% |
| 1980 | 6,663 | −17.7% |
| 1990 | 5,566 | −16.5% |
| 2000 | 5,035 | −9.5% |
| 2010 | 4,358 | −13.4% |
| 2020 | 3,753 | −13.9% |

== History ==
As with all of Kōchi Prefecture, the area of Tosa was part of ancient Tosa Province. During the Edo period, the area was part of the holdings of Tosa Domain ruled by the Yamauchi clan from their seat at Kōchi Castle. The village of Jizōji (地蔵寺村) was established within Tosa District, Kōchi and the village of Tai (田井村) was established within Nagaoka District, Kōchi with the creation of the modern municipalities system on October 1, 1889. The two villages merged on March 31, 1955 to form the village of Tosa, which was elevated to town status on April 1, 1970.

== Government ==
Tosa has a mayor-council form of government with a directly elected mayor and a unicameral town council of ten members. Tosa, together with the other municipalities of Tosa District and Nagaoka District, contributes one member to the Kōchi Prefectural Assembly. In terms of national politics, the village is part of Kōchi 1st district of the lower house of the Diet of Japan.

== Economy ==
Key industries in Tosa are the primary industries: agriculture, livestock, and forestry. Farming takes advantage of the geographical differences in elevation and the difference in temperature between day and night. There are terraced rice fields and rice is the main product, followed by livestock, dairy and vegetables. In particular, the rice terraces on the fertile south bank of the Jizoji River produce high-quality rice. Farmers who have acquired ISO 14001 certification refrain from using chemical fertilizers, and use fertilizers made at the Tosa Town Compost Center to grow rice and garden vegetables with reduced pesticides, and brand "Reihoku Hachisai".

== Education ==
Tosa has one public elementary school and one public middle school operated by the town government. The town does not have a high school.

== Transportation ==
=== Railway ===
Tosa has no passenger railway service. The nearest station is Ōsugi Station on the JR Shikoku Dosan Line; however, most passengers travel to Kōchi Station by bus.

=== Highways ===
- National Route 439

== Local attractions ==
- Sameura Dam
