= Motoyama, Kōchi =

Motoyama 本山町
- Town
- View of Motoyama on route 439

- Flag Chapter
- Location of Motoyama in Kōchi Prefecture

- Location in Japan
- Coordinates: 33°45′N 133°35′E
- Country: Japan
- Region: Shikoku
- Prefecture: Kōchi
- District: Nagaoka

Area
  - Total: 134.22 km^{2} (51.82 sq mi)

Population (July 31, 2022)
  - Total: 3,318
  - Density: 24.72/km^{2} (64.03/sq mi)
- Time zone: UTC+09:00 (JST)
- City hall address: 504 Motoyama, Motoyama-chō, Nagaoka-gun, Kōchi-ken 781-3692
- Climate: Cfa
- Website: Official website
- Symbols
- Bird: Japanese robin
- Flower: Cherry blossom
- Tree: Hinoki

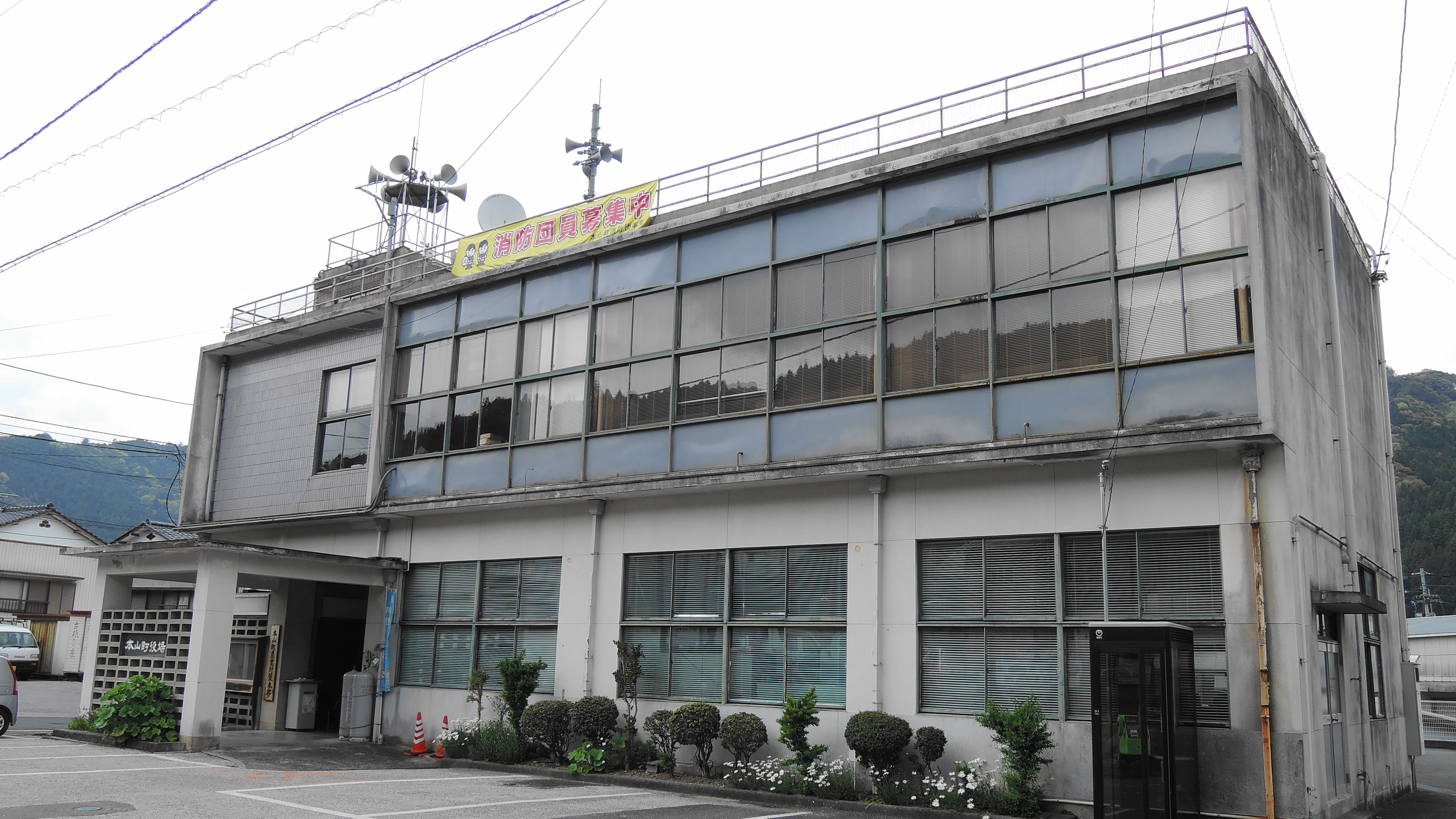
Motoyama town hall

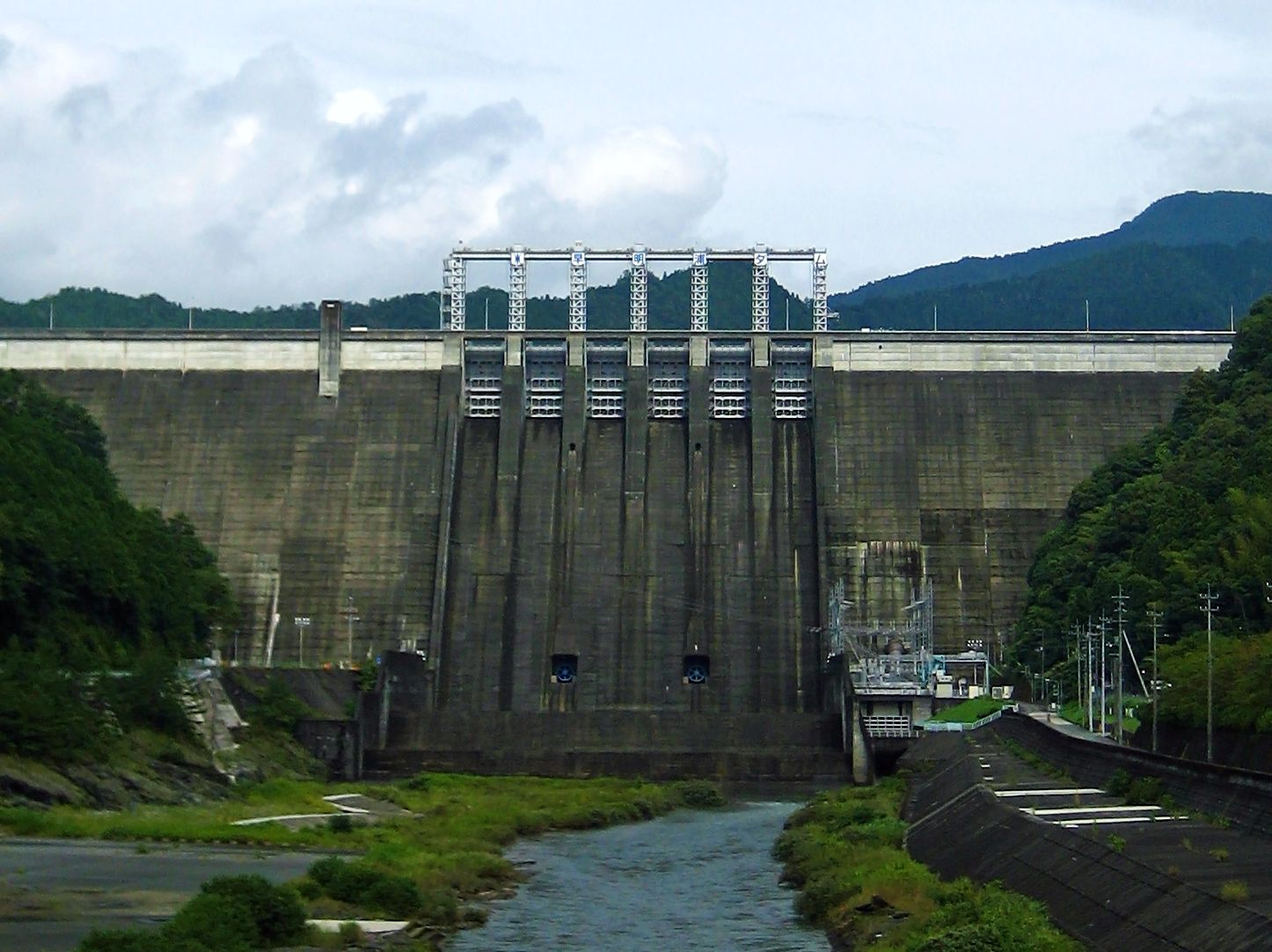
Sameura Dam

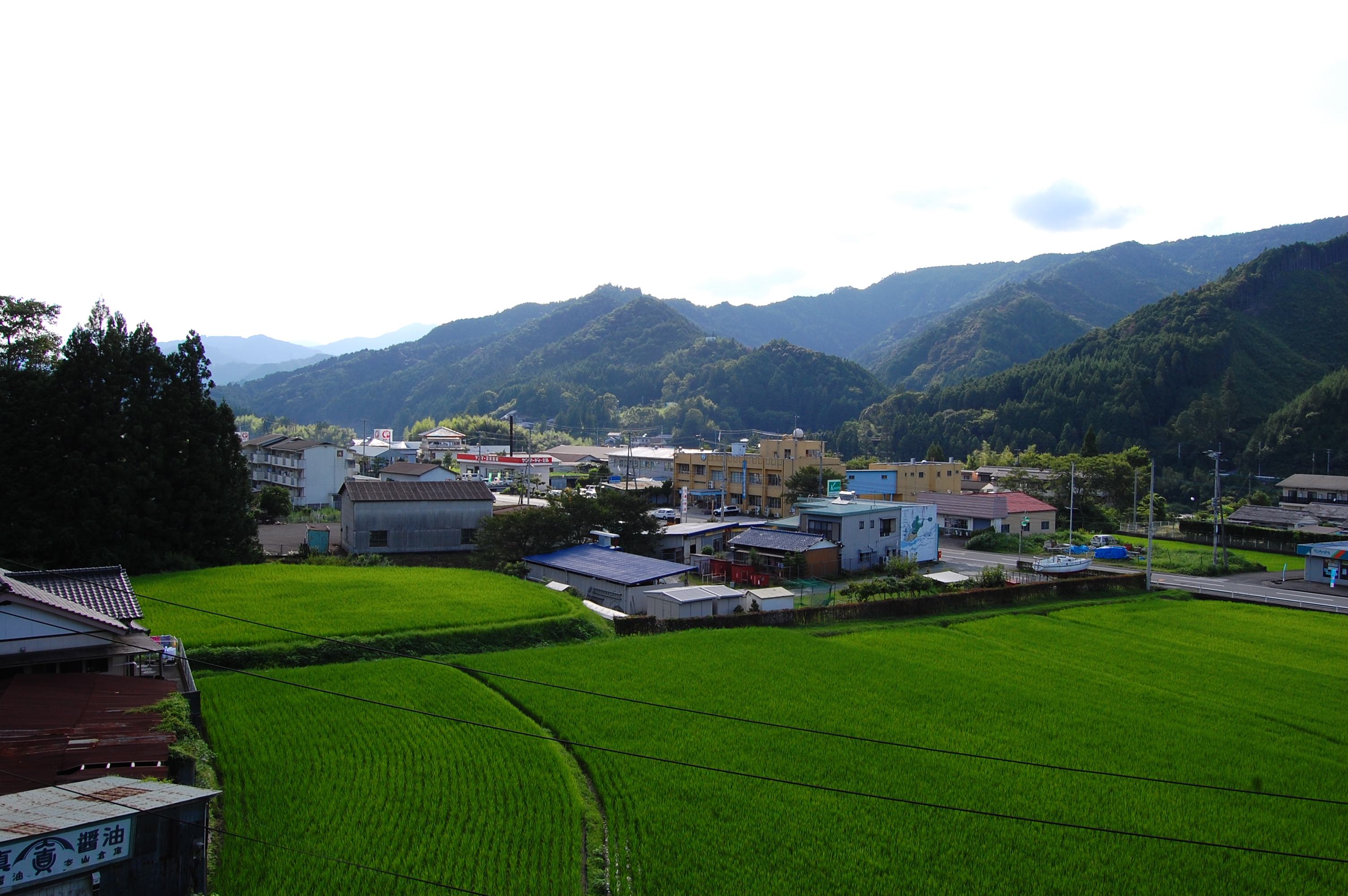
central Motoyama

Motoyama (本山町, Motoyama-chō) is a town located in Nagaoka District, Kōchi Prefecture, Japan. As of 31 July 2022, the town had an estimated population of 3‚318 in 1858 households and a population density of 25 persons per km^{2}. The total area of the town is 134.22 square kilometres (51.82 sq mi). Motoyama has been named one of The Most Beautiful Villages in Japan.

== Geography ==
Motoyama is located in the Shikoku Mountains near the center of northern Kōchi Prefecture. The upper reaches of the Yoshino River and Shikoku's largest dam, the Sameura Dam are located in the town.

=== Neighbouring municipalities ===
Ehime Prefecture

- Shikokuchūō

Kōchi Prefecture

- Kami
- Nankoku
- Ōtoyo
- Tosa

=== Climate ===
Motoyama has a humid subtropical climate (Köppen climate classification Cfa) with hot, humid summers and cool winters. There is significant precipitation throughout the year, especially during June and July. The average annual temperature in Motoyama is 14.2 °C (57.6 °F). The average annual rainfall is 2,892.3 mm (113.87 in) with September as the wettest month. The temperatures are highest on average in August, at around 25.2 °C (77.4 °F), and lowest in January, at around 3.3 °C (37.9 °F). The highest temperature ever recorded in Motoyama was 38.7 °C (101.7 °F) on 30 July 2026; the coldest temperature ever recorded was −8.9 °C (16.0 °F) on 16 January 2011.

Climate data for Motoyama (1991−2020 normals, extremes 1977−present)
Month	Jan	Feb	Mar	Apr	May	Jun	Jul	Aug	Sep	Oct	Nov	Dec	Year
Record high °C (°F)	18.8 (65.8)	23.6 (74.5)	28.1 (82.6)	31.5 (88.7)	33.2 (91.8)	35.7 (96.3)	38.7 (101.7)	38.1 (100.6)	35.9 (96.6)	31.7 (89.1)	26.2 (79.2)	22.6 (72.7)	38.7 (101.7)
Mean daily maximum °C (°F)	9.3 (48.7)	10.5 (50.9)	14.3 (57.7)	19.9 (67.8)	24.4 (75.9)	26.7 (80.1)	30.6 (87.1)	31.4 (88.5)	27.8 (82.0)	22.7 (72.9)	16.7 (62.1)	11.2 (52.2)	20.5 (68.8)
Daily mean °C (°F)	3.3 (37.9)	4.2 (39.6)	7.7 (45.9)	12.7 (54.9)	17.3 (63.1)	21.0 (69.8)	24.8 (76.6)	25.2 (77.4)	21.9 (71.4)	16.2 (61.2)	10.5 (50.9)	5.3 (41.5)	14.2 (57.5)
Mean daily minimum °C (°F)	−1.1 (30.0)	−0.5 (31.1)	2.3 (36.1)	6.7 (44.1)	11.9 (53.4)	17.1 (62.8)	21.1 (70.0)	21.6 (70.9)	18.1 (64.6)	12.0 (53.6)	6.3 (43.3)	1.2 (34.2)	9.7 (49.5)
Record low °C (°F)	−8.9 (16.0)	−8.4 (16.9)	−5.7 (21.7)	−2.7 (27.1)	1.9 (35.4)	7.2 (45.0)	13.4 (56.1)	14.0 (57.2)	7.8 (46.0)	2.3 (36.1)	−2.8 (27.0)	−5.6 (21.9)	−8.9 (16.0)
Average precipitation mm (inches)	67.6 (2.66)	103.6 (4.08)	173.6 (6.83)	196.0 (7.72)	241.9 (9.52)	352.6 (13.88)	452.6 (17.82)	410.1 (16.15)	426.9 (16.81)	226.4 (8.91)	122.3 (4.81)	95.6 (3.76)	2,892.3 (113.87)
Average precipitation days (≥ 1.0 mm)	7.5	9.0	11.7	10.8	10.8	14.5	13.8	13.7	12.8	9.2	7.6	7.9	129.3
Mean monthly sunshine hours	149.0	145.3	165.4	184.2	188.7	122.6	145.7	160.6	125.4	146.5	133.1	135.3	1,801.8
Source: Japan Meteorological Agency

== Demographics ==
Per Japanese census data, the population of Motoyama has declined by more than half over the past 60 years.

Historical population
Year	Pop.	±%
1960	8,476	—
1965	7,343	−13.4%
1970	7,052	−4.0%
1975	6,265	−11.2%
1980	6,011	−4.1%
1985	5,566	−7.4%
1990	5,215	−6.3%
1995	4,901	−6.0%
2000	4,657	−5.0%
2005	4,374	−6.1%
2010	4,103	−6.2%
2015	3,573	−12.9%
2020	3,261	−8.7%
Source: Motoyama population statistics

== History ==
As with all of Kōchi Prefecture, the area of Motoyama was part of ancient Tosa Province. During the Edo period, the area was part of the holdings of Tosa Domain ruled by the Yamauchi clan from their seat at Kōchi Castle. The village of Nishi-Motoyama was established with the creation of the modern municipalities system on October 1, 1889 out of 12 smaller hamlets. It was renamed Motoyama Village on June 1, 1890. Motoyama was raised to town status on June 1, 1910. On April 20, 1955, Motomachi merged with the neighboring town of Yoshino. However, on April 1, 1961, five western hamlets of Motomachi were transferred to the neighboring town of Tosa.

== Government ==
Motoyama has a mayor-council form of government with a directly elected mayor and a unicameral town council of ten members. Motoyama, together with the other municipalities of Tosa District and Nagaoka District, contributes one member to the Kōchi Prefectural Assembly. In terms of national politics, the village is part of Kōchi 1st district of the lower house of the Diet of Japan.

== Economy ==
The economy of Motoyama is based forestry, agriculture and the raising of Japanese Brown beef cattle.

== Education ==
Motomachi has two public elementary schools and one public middle school operated by the town government, and one public high school operated by the Kochi Prefectural Board of Education

== Transportation ==
=== Railway ===
Motoyama has no passenger railway service. The nearest station is Ōsugi Station on the JR Shikoku Dosan Line; however, most passengers travel to Kōchi Station by bus.

=== Highways ===
- National Route 439

== Sister cities ==
- Upper Darby Township, Pennsylvania, United States, friendship city since August 10, 1966

== Local attractions ==
=== Events ===
- Flower Festival (Hana-matsuri) March 25 – May 6

A festival which welcomes the coming of spring along with the blooming of various flowers. Cherry blossoms and Tsutsuji (azalea) can be seen in the central area of Motoyama, while the highlight of the festival can be seen at the nearby Kizenzan Park (帰全山公園) where over 30,000 Shakunage (rhododendron) are displayed.

- Asemi River Marathon late July

An annual marathon first held in 1986, where roughly 500 participants run along the Asemi river.

- Yoshino River Rafting Festival middle of August

This raft racing festival has origins from when lumber traders shipped hinoki (cypress) wood from Shiraga Mountain in rafts down the river. Participants can race in either traditional style raft racing or the free style division. The traditional style race involves teams with 6 participants racing on rafts made of wooden logs over 5m in length. The free style class involves participating teams bringing their own self made rafts. These teams compete over not just the visual attractiveness of the raft but also the `style` in which they raft down the river.

- Town Festival middle of August

The annual town festival features a traditional Taiko performance, Bon odori (Japanese folk dance), and fireworks. There is also a parade leading up to the festival where Yosakoi style dancing can be seen.

- Athletic Festival early October

This 50-year-old festival features teams from various businesses and professions participating in athletic competitions. Hundreds of locals participate in various athletic games in hopes of promoting the benefits of team work and healthy competition.

- Autumn Culture Festival middle of November

Held during the time of harvest in Motoyama. There are also shops set up from Motoyama's sister town, Urausu. The local community center hosts stage performances and also exhibits local art. At the closing of the festival, a Mochi scattering ceremony is held where hundreds of people fill the assembly grounds.

=== Tourist sites ===
A view of Motoyama town from on top of Sameura Dam

Akadaki Falls (赤滝)
Deep inside the mountains one can see a waterfall that sews its way through the greenery and foliage.

Asemi River Glen (汗見川渓谷, Asemigawa keikoku)
A location with thousands of years of history with beautiful flowers in the spring but is also a great place to go camping in the summer.

Mount Kizen Park (帰全山公園, Kizen-zan kõen)
In spring time the park is full of cherry blossoms and shakunage flowers (rhododendron), a sight that is famous within Kochi prefecture. In fact, the park is also called Shakunage Park. At the entrance is a statue of Kenzan Nonaka (野中 兼山), a local politician during the Edo period.

Mount Shiraga (白髪山, Shiraga-yama)
At 1470 m Shiraga is Motoyama's most prominent mountain. When ascending the mountain, one can see hinoki (cypress) trees from 150 to 200 years old by the road side.
There are two approach sites where mountaineers can begin their ascent, which should take no more than 90 minutes.

=== Local products ===
- Organic rice
- Shiitake mushrooms
- Reihoku beef
- Shiso (Perilla frutescens var. crispa) juice
- Yuzu orange juice
- Yuzu orange vinegar
- Miso
- Green tea and senna tea
