= Kōchi Prefecture =

Prefecture of Japan

Kōchi Prefecture 高知県
- Prefecture

Japanese transcription(s)
  - Japanese: 高知県
  - Rōmaji: Kōchi-ken
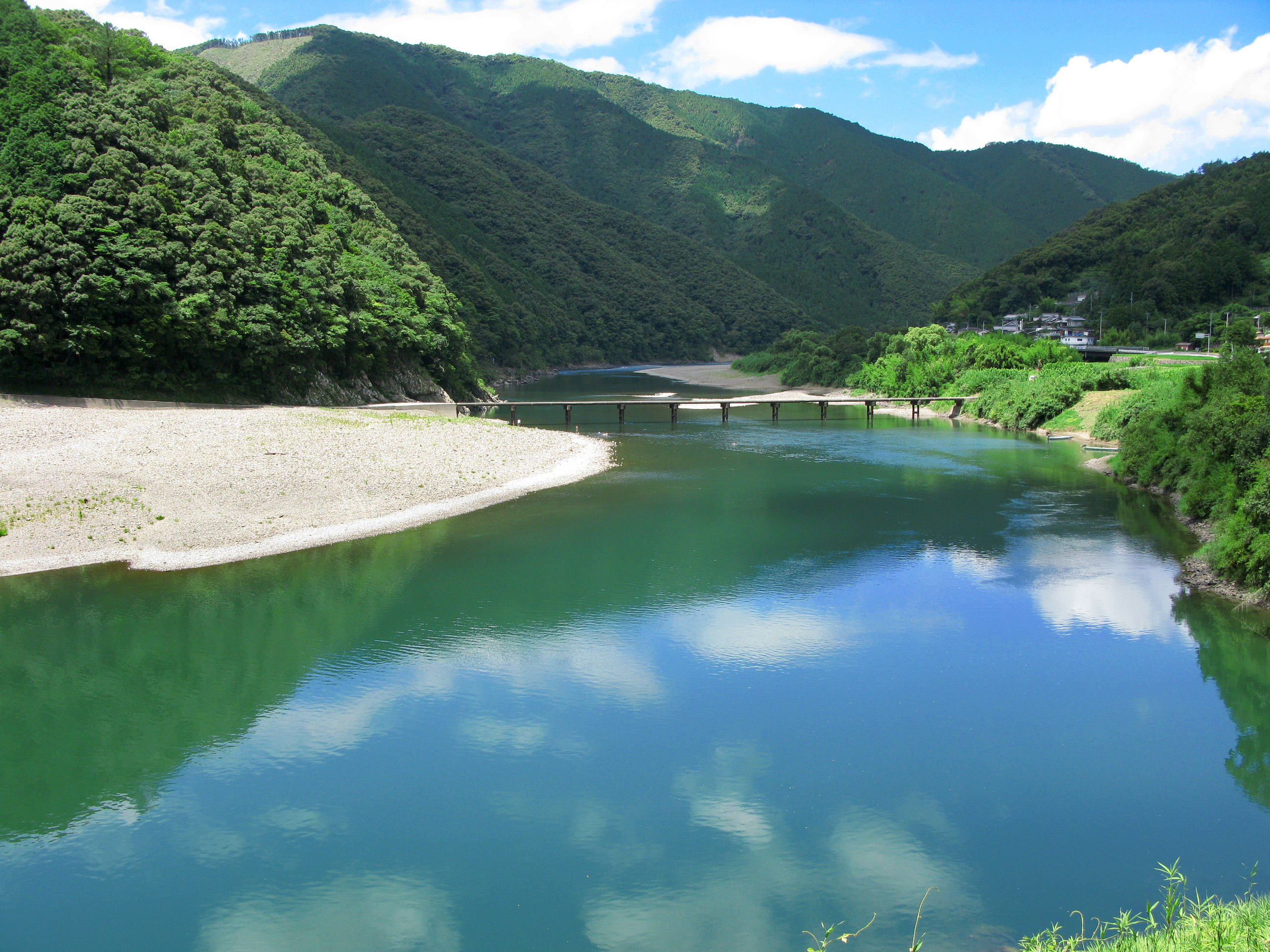
- Shimanto River and Iwama Bridge, famous sights in Shimanto City, Kōchi Prefecture

- Flag Symbol
- Anthem: Kōchi kenmin no uta
- Coordinates: 33°26′N 133°26′E
- Country: Japan
- Region: Shikoku
- Island: Shikoku
- Capital: Kōchi
- Subdivisions: Districts: 6, Municipalities: 34

Government
  - Governor: Seiji Hamada

Area
  - Total: 7,103.93 km^{2} (2,742.84 sq mi)
  - Rank: 18th

Population (February 1, 2025)
  - Total: 652,459
  - Rank: 45th
  - Density: 91.9/km^{2} (238/sq mi)

GDP
  - Total: JP¥ 2,407 billion US$ 17.8 billion (2022)
- ISO 3166 code: JP-39
- Website: www.pref.kochi.lg.jp/english/
- Symbols of Japan
- Bird: Fairy pitta (Pitta nympha)
- Flower: Yamamomo (Myrica rubra)
- Tree: Yanase Sugi (Cryptomeria japonica)

Kōchi Prefecture (高知県, Kōchi-ken; Japanese pronunciation: [kó̞ò̞.c̟͡ɕì, kò̞ó̞.c̟͡ɕi̥.kè̞ɴ̀, kó̞ó̞.c̟͡ɕi̥-], locally [kó̞ó̞.c̟͡ɕí]) is a prefecture of Japan located on the island of Shikoku. Kōchi Prefecture has a population of 634,974 (1 September 2026) and has a geographic area of 7,103 km^{2} (2,742 sq mi). Kōchi Prefecture borders Ehime Prefecture to the northwest and Tokushima Prefecture to the northeast.

Kōchi is the capital and largest city of Kōchi Prefecture, with other major cities including Nankoku, Shimanto, and Kōnan. Kōchi Prefecture is located on Japan's Pacific coast surrounding a large bay in the south of Shikoku, with the southernmost point of the island located at Cape Ashizuri in Tosashimizu. Kōchi Prefecture is home to Kōchi Castle, considered the most intact Japanese castle, and the Shimanto River, one of the few undammed rivers in Japan.

== History ==
=== Antiquity ===
==== Before the Ritsuryō System ====
In the Kujiki, first recorded governments in Kōchi Prefecture were Hata (in the west) and Tosa (in the center). Hata was established first, so it is thought that it had more influence and contact with the Yamato court. Written records from this time period are sparse, however it is believed that the first governors of Hata and Tosa were from the Kamo clan based in modern Osaka.

==== After the Ritsuryō System ====
In the Nihon Shoki, the first report from an official in the Kōchi region described the damages caused by the 684 Hakuhō earthquake. From this report, it can be inferred that by 684 at the latest, the Tosa Province (a predecessor to modern-day Kōchi Prefecture) had been established. The first report from a named official was written by Hiketa no Mushiro in 743.

Up until the Genpei War, 106 governors were appointed to govern the Tosa Province. Eventually, like many other provinces Tosa also was appointed absentee governors, given additional rights, and began amassing wealth. Due to being located far from the capital, many prisoners were exiled to the Tosa Province.

=== Middle ages ===
==== Kamakura period ====
The Kamakura Shogunate was established at the end of the 12th century. Since Tosa Province was allied to the winning Minamoto Clan in the Genpei War, it quickly fell under the influence of the shogunate. Kajiwara Tomokage was appointed as the first military governor of the Tosa Province. Eventually, the Hōjō Clan began serving as the military governor for the province.

==== Muromachi period ====
After the fall of the Kamakura Shoguante, Ashikaga Takauji was defeated in battle and forced to retreat to Kyushu. Shikoku Island later fell under the control of the Hosokawa Clan.

Kōchi Prefecture was historically known as Tosa Province and was controlled by the Chōsokabe clan in the Sengoku period and the Yamauchi clan during the Edo period.

Kōchi city is also the birthplace of noted revolutionary Sakamoto Ryōma, who became one of the main instigators of the Meiji Restoration.

== Geography ==
Kōchi Prefecture comprises the southwestern part of the island of Shikoku, facing the Pacific Ocean. It is bordered by Ehime to the north-west and Tokushima to the north-east. It is the largest but least populous of Shikoku's four prefectures. Most of the province is mountainous, and in only a few areas such as around Kōchi and Nakamura is there a coastal plain. Kōchi is famous for its many rivers. Inamura-yama in Tosa-cho is the highest peak in Kōchi prefecture with an altitude of 1,506 meters above sea level.

Kōchi Prefecture has the highest percentage of land covered in mountains out of all Japanese prefectures at 89% with the national average being 66%. Due to its location in the Shimanto Group geological area, Kōchi Prefecture has many sedimentary rocks and is prone to landslides. Kōchi Prefecture has many rivers such as the Shimanto River in the western part of the prefecture, Niyodo River flowing from Mount Ishizuchi into the Tosa Bay, and Yoshino River flowing into Tokushima Prefecture.

Historically, Kōchi Prefecture has not suffered from a lack of water, however river management has been a consistent issue. In the early Edo Period, samurai Nonaka Kenzan oversaw large scale improvements to the Tosa Domain's major rivers. Modern Kōchi Prefecture is known for its river management and minimal water damage despite receiving a large amount of rainfall.

The Kuroshio Current flows by Kōchi Prefecture's coast. The climate of Kōchi Prefecture is heavily influenced by the Kuroshio Current. Even during the winter the water is still warm, and causes frequent typhoons. Kōchi Prefecture experiences the 2nd most typhoons out of all the Japanese prefectures after Kagoshima Prefecture. The 1934 Muroto Typhoon was especially notorious, with the lowest central pressure of any recorded typhoon in Japan at 911.6 hPa when it made landfall on the Muroto Cape. The Ashizuri and Muroto capes are known for their strong winds.

As of April 1, 2012, 7% of the total land area of the prefecture was designated as Natural Parks, namely the Ashizuri-Uwakai National Park; Ishizuchi, Muroto-Anan Kaigan, and Tsurugisan Quasi-National Parks; and eighteen Prefectural Natural Parks.

Map of Kōchi Prefecture City Town Village

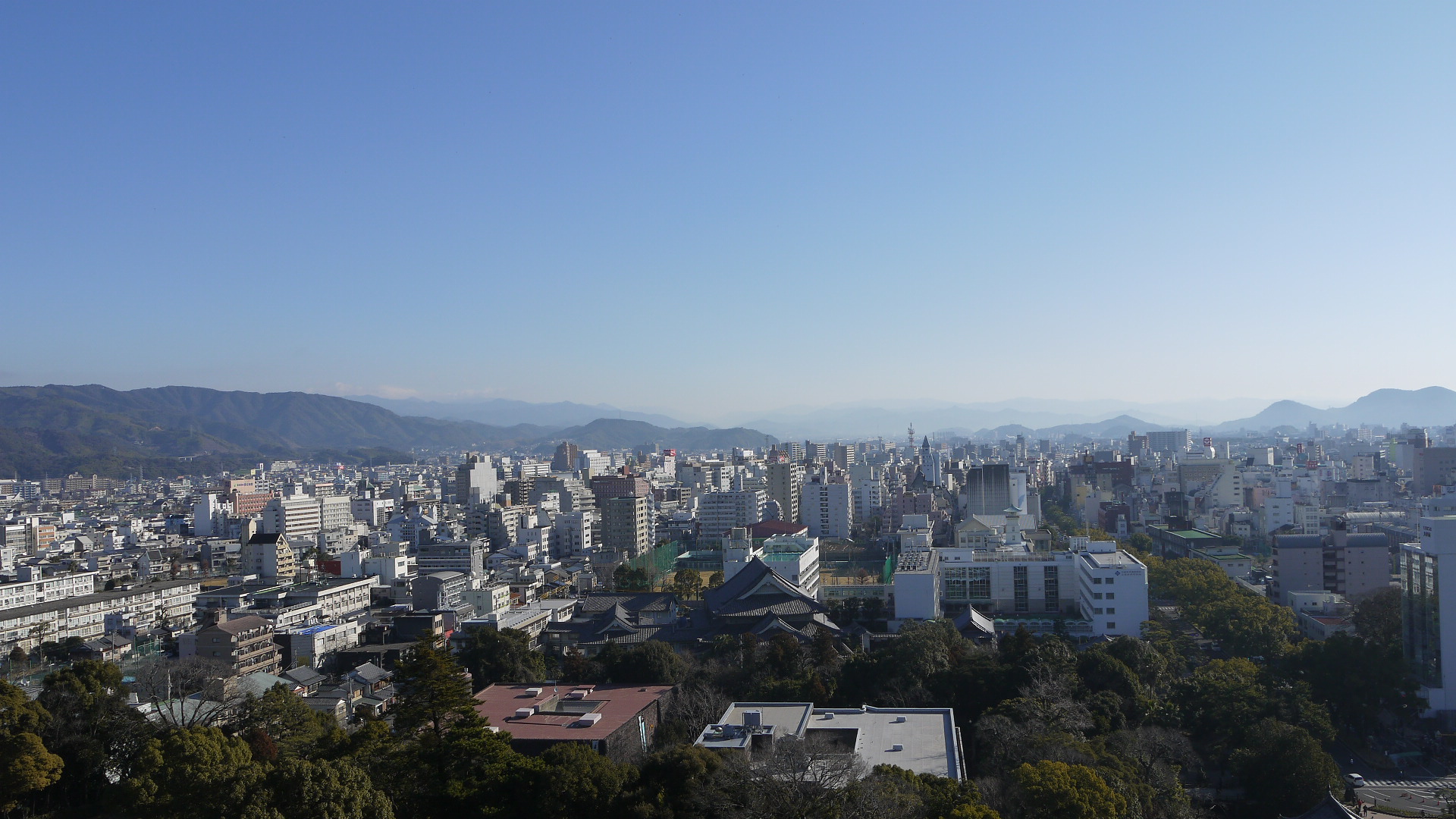
Skyline of Kōchi City

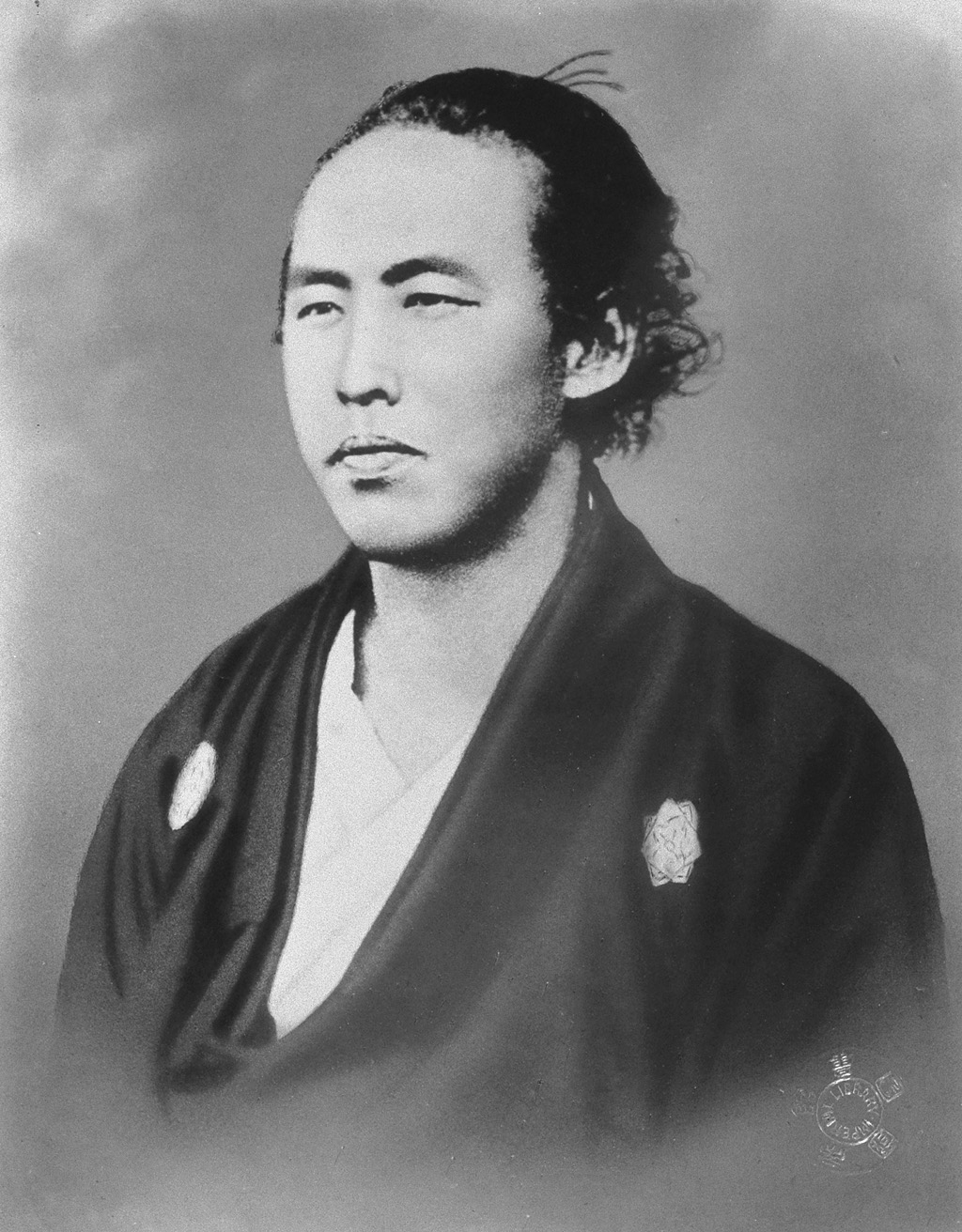
Sakamoto Ryōma

=== Cities ===
Eleven cities are located in Kōchi Prefecture:

Flag	Name		Area (km^{2})	Population	Map
Flag	Rōmaji	Kanji	Area (km^{2})	Population	Map
	Aki	安芸市	317.34	17,810	
	Kami	香美市	537.95	26,526	
	Kōchi (capital)	高知市	309.22	319,077	
	Kōnan	香南市	126.75	32,786	
	Muroto	室戸市	248.25	14,006	
	Nankoku	南国市	125.35	47,776	
	Shimanto	四万十市	632.42	34,433	
	Sukumo	宿毛市	286.11	21,097	
	Susaki	須崎市	135.46	22,508	
	Tosa	土佐市	91.59	27,602	
	Tosashimizu	土佐清水市	266.54	14,666	

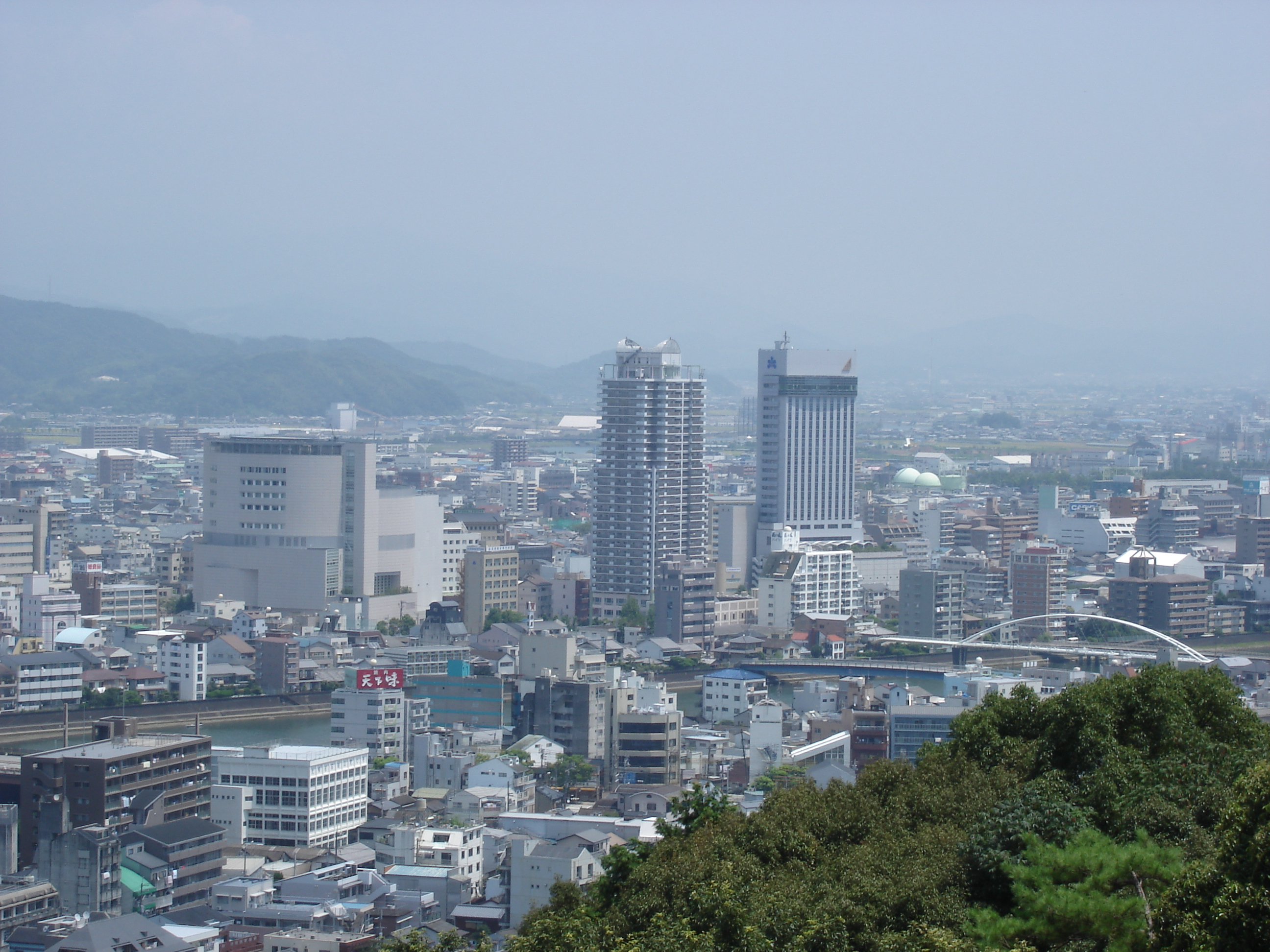
Kōchi City

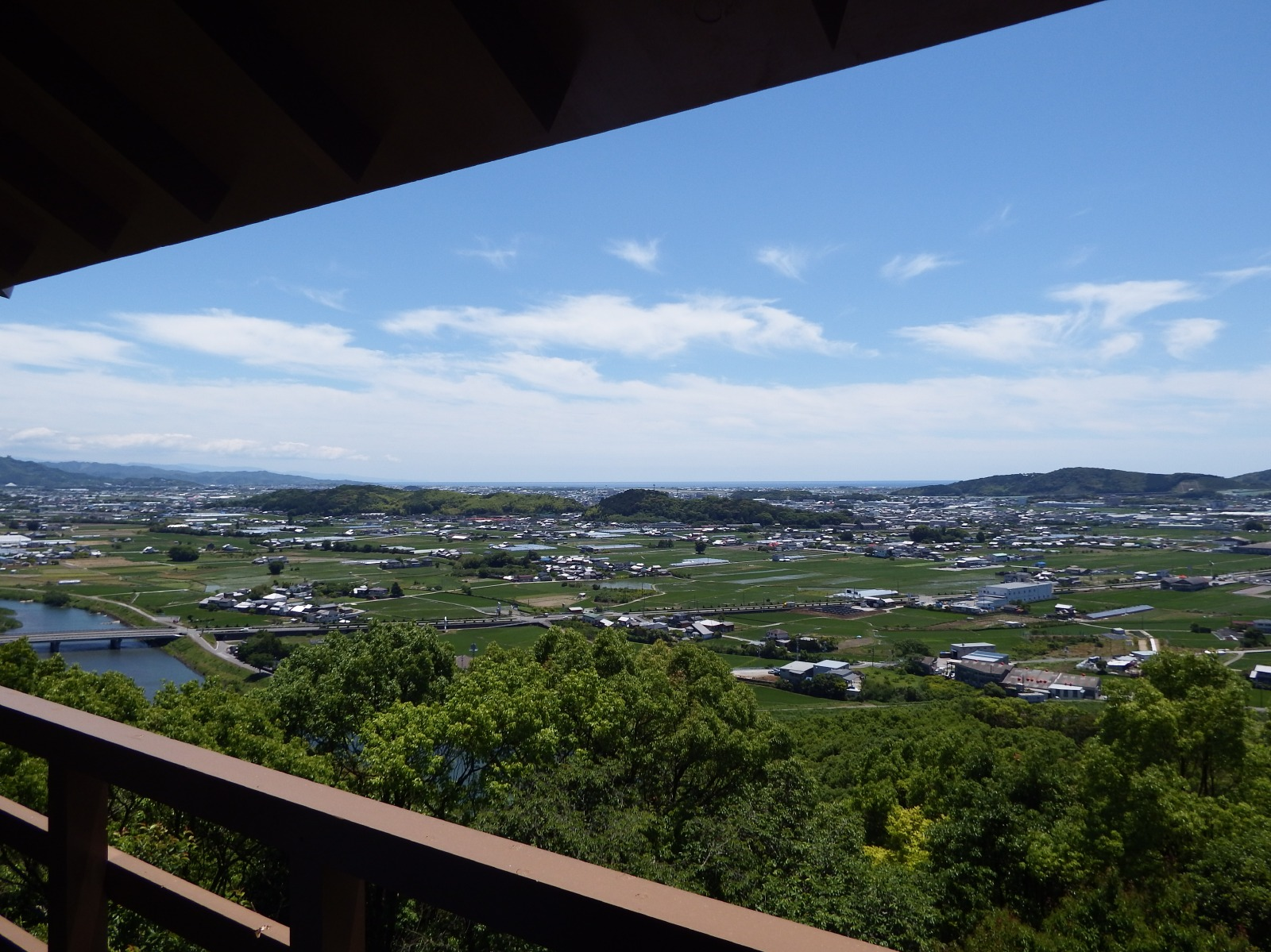
Nankoku City

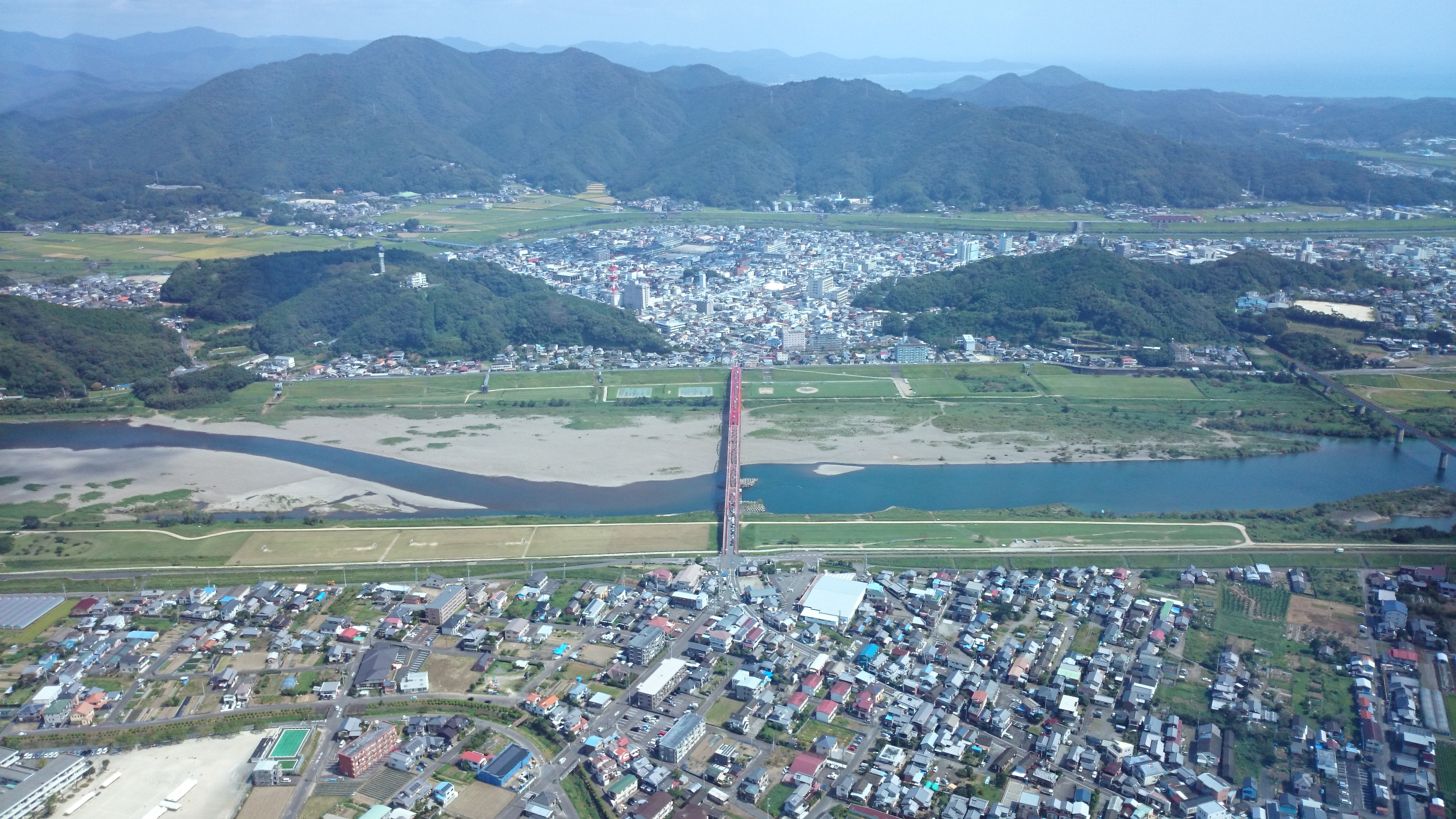
Shimanto City

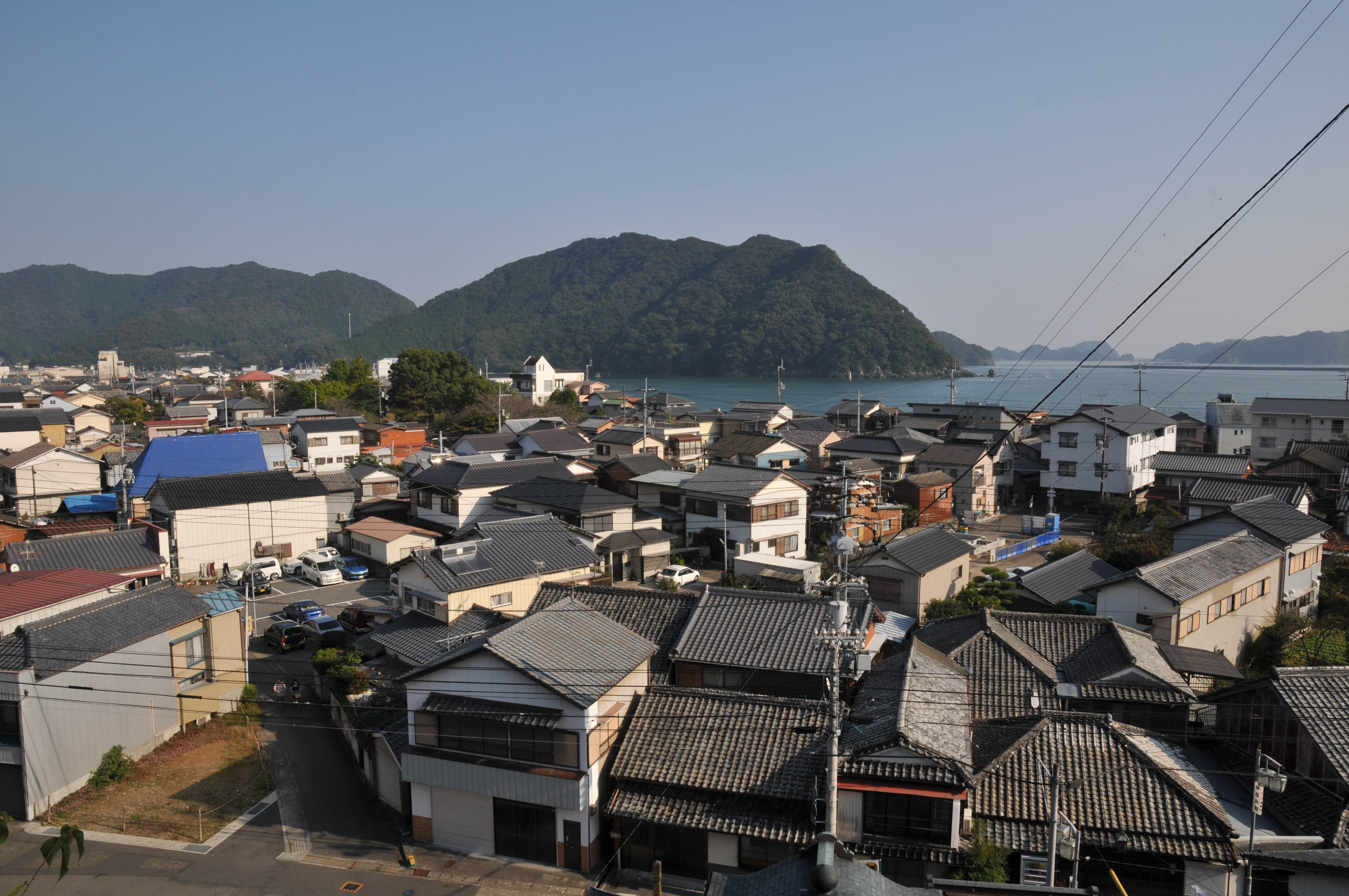
Susaki City

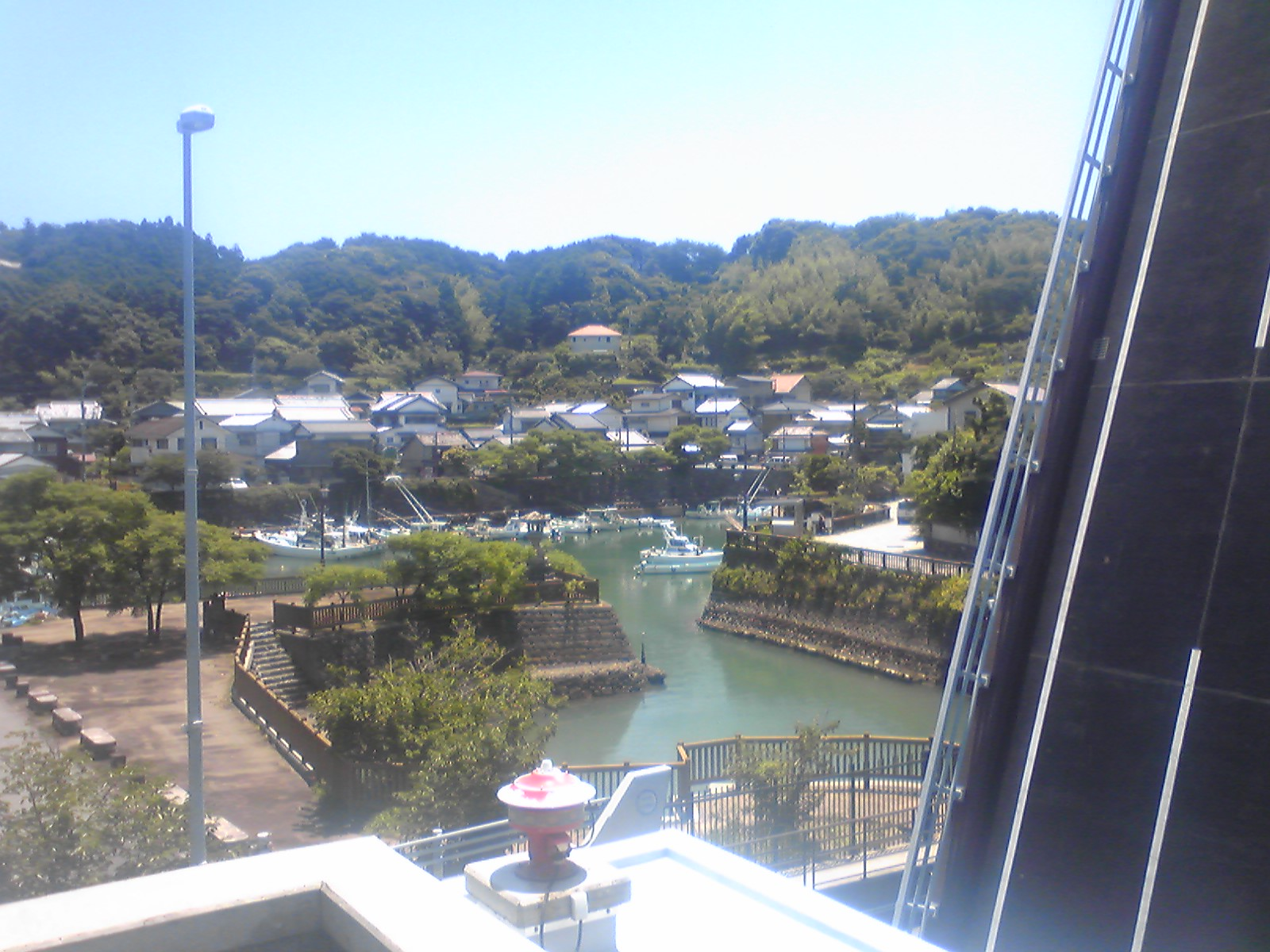
Kōnan City

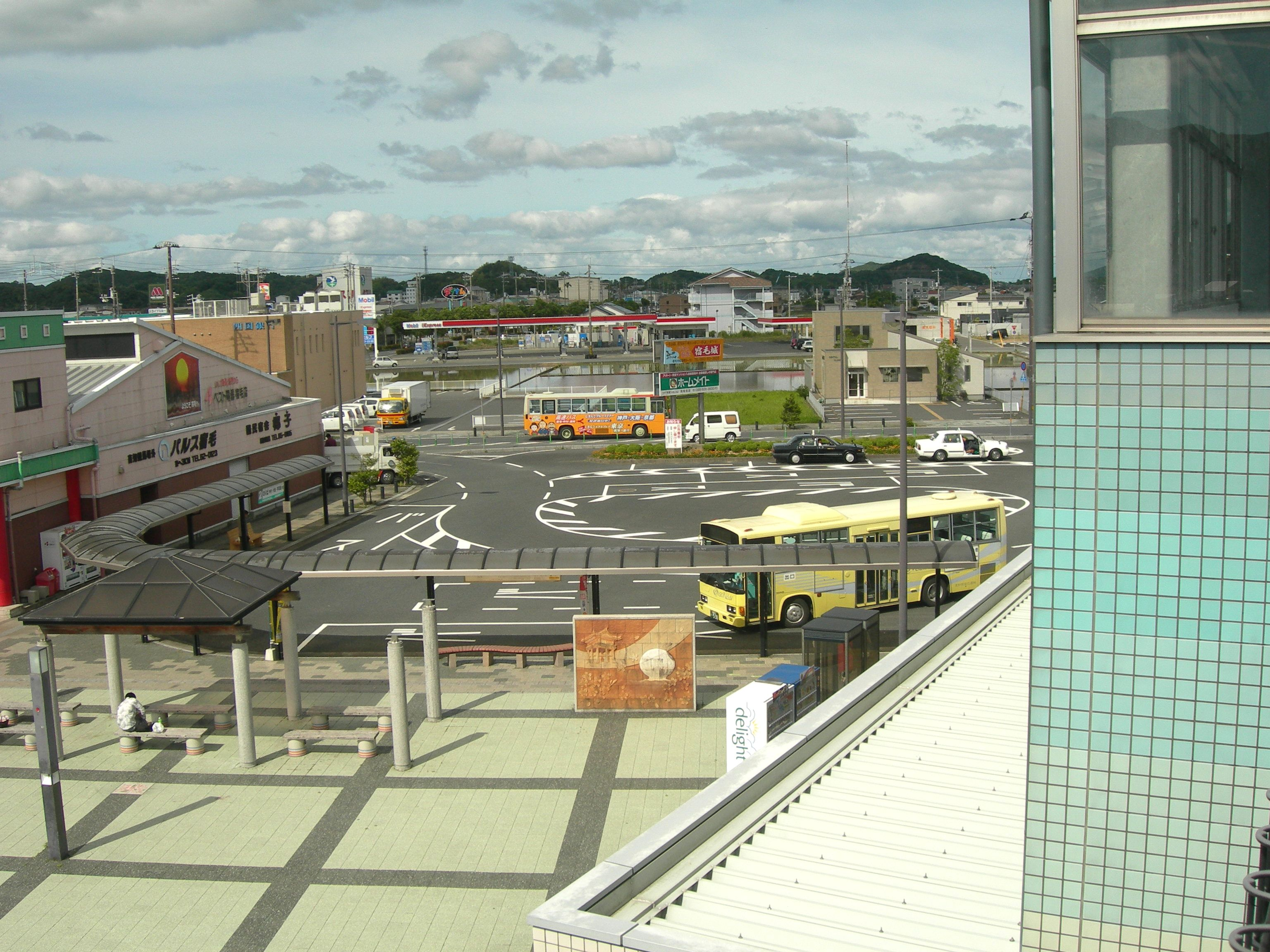
Sukumo City

=== Towns and villages ===
Kochi prefecture population pyramid in 2020

These are the towns and villages in each district:

Name		Area (km^{2})	Population	District	Type	Map
Rōmaji	Kanji	Area (km^{2})	Population	District	Type	Map
Geisei	芸西村	39.63	3,846	Aki District	Village	
Hidaka	日高村	44.88	4,896	Takaoka District	Village	
Ino	いの町	470.71	22,155	Agawa District	Town	
Kitagawa	北川村	196.18	1‚328	Aki District	Village	
Kuroshio	黒潮町	188.38	11,559	Hata District	Town	
Mihara	三原村	85.35	1,627	Hata District	Village	
Motoyama	本山町	134.21	3,605	Nagaoka District	Town	
Nahari	奈半利町	28.32	3,359	Aki District	Town	
Nakatosa	中土佐町	193.19	7,156	Takaoka District	Town	
Niyodogawa	仁淀川町	332.96	5,676	Agawa District	Town	
Ochi	越知町	111.58	5,847	Takaoka District	Town	
Ōkawa	大川村	95.28	521	Tosa District	Village	
Ōtoyo	大豊町	314.94	4,950	Nagaoka District	Town	
Ōtsuki	大月町	103.03	5,719	Hata District	Town	
Sakawa	佐川町	101.21	13,223	Takaoka District	Town	
Shimanto	四万十町	642.06	18,269	Takaoka District	Town	
Tano	田野町	6.56	2,644	Aki District	Town	
Tosa	土佐町	212.11	3,997	Tosa District	Town	
Tōyō	東洋町	74.09	2,598	Aki District	Town	
Tsuno	津野町	197.85	5,680	Takaoka District	Town	
Umaji	馬路村	165.48	737	Aki District	Village	
Yasuda	安田町	53.03	2,614	Aki District	Town	
Yusuhara	梼原町	236.51	3,640	Takaoka District	Town	

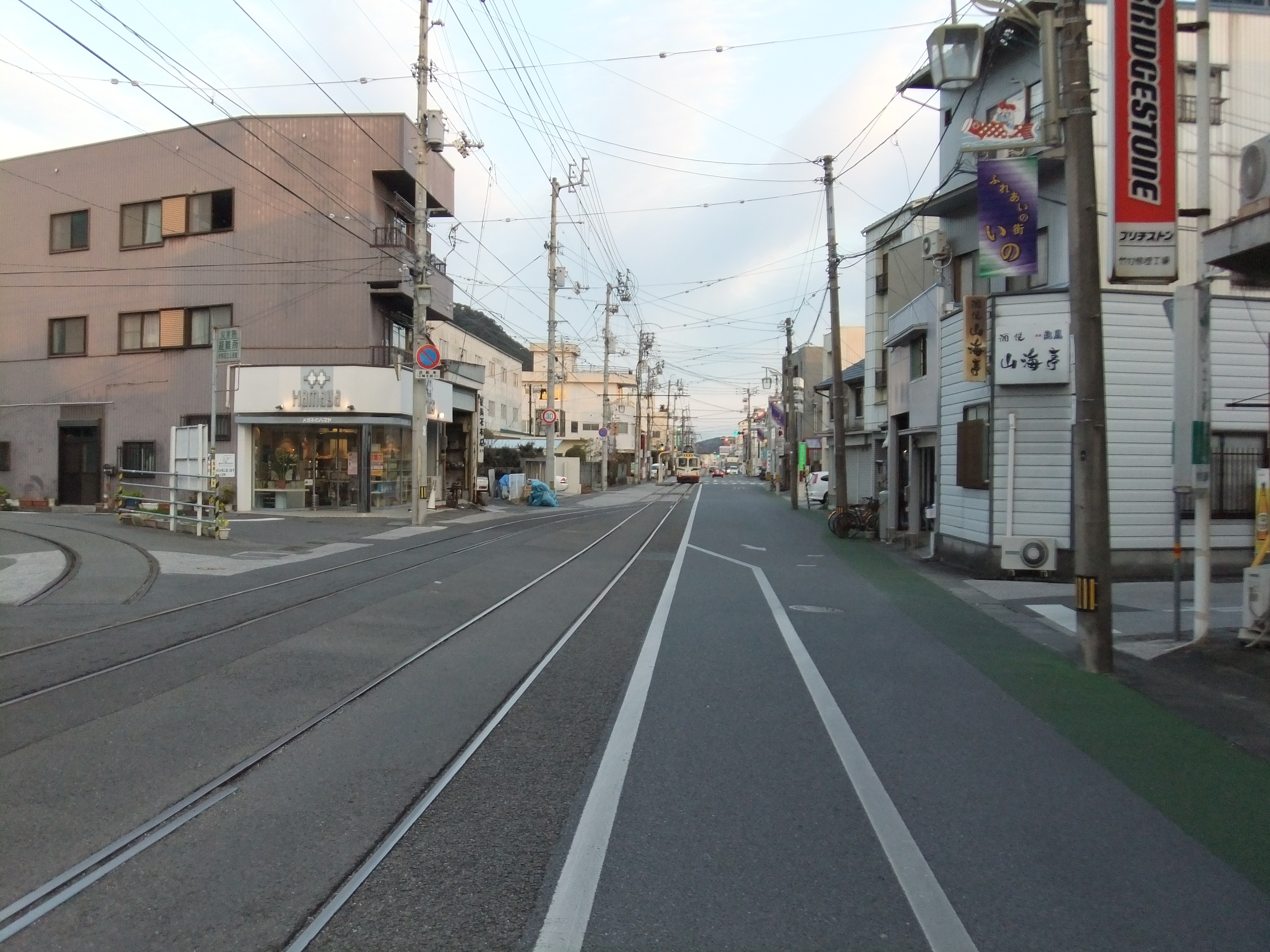
Ino Town

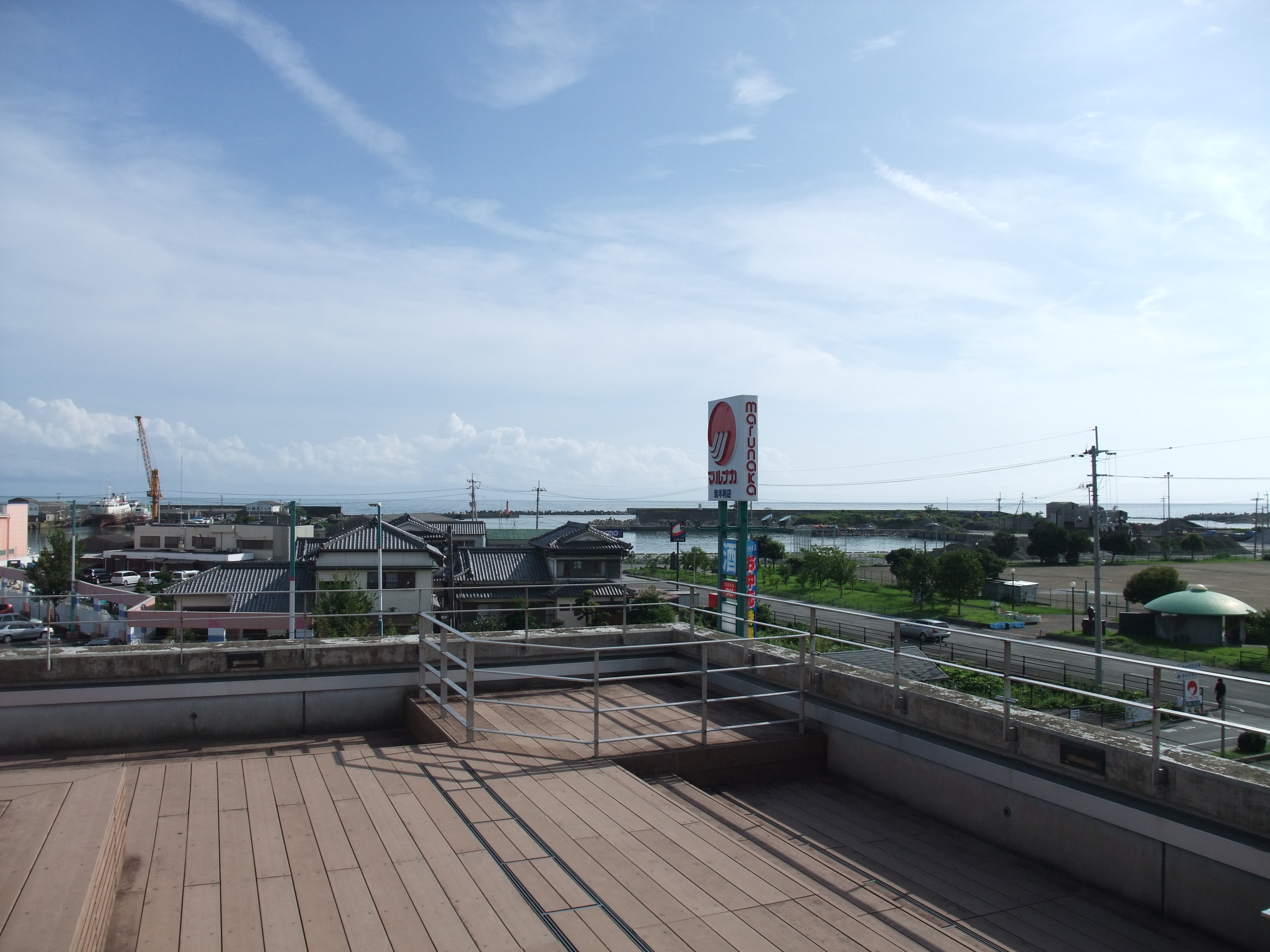
Nahari Town

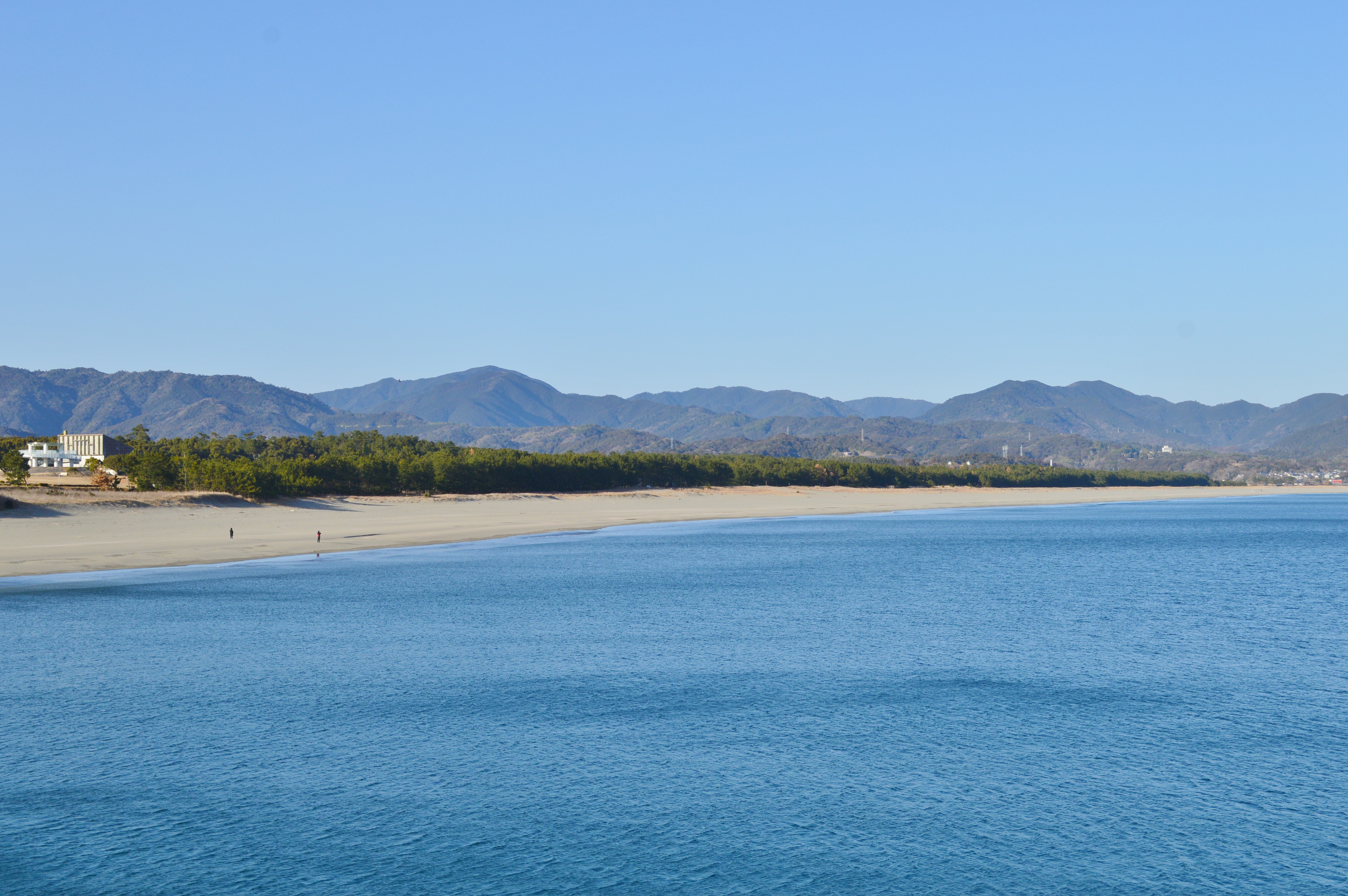
Kuroshio Town

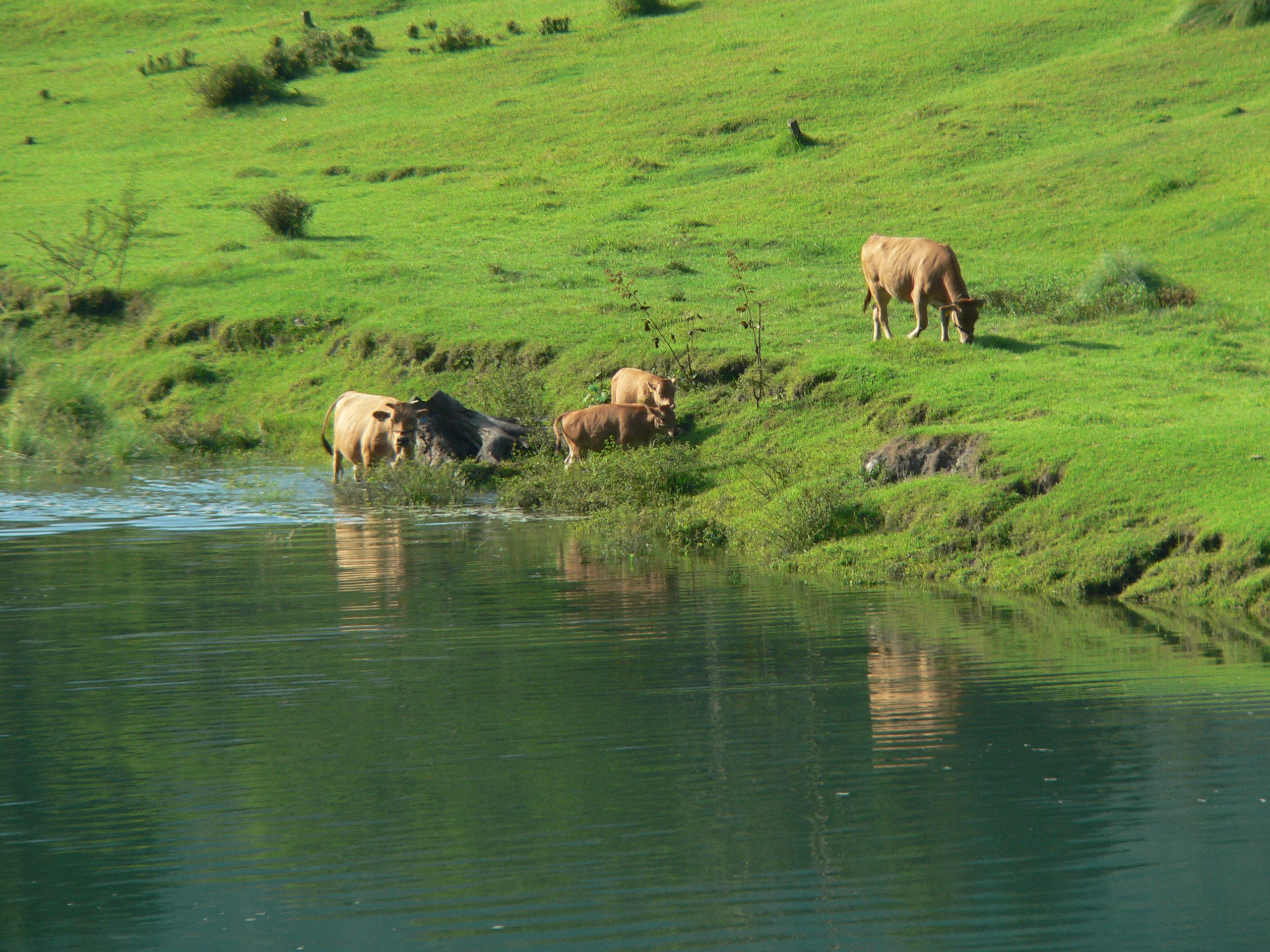
Motoyama Town

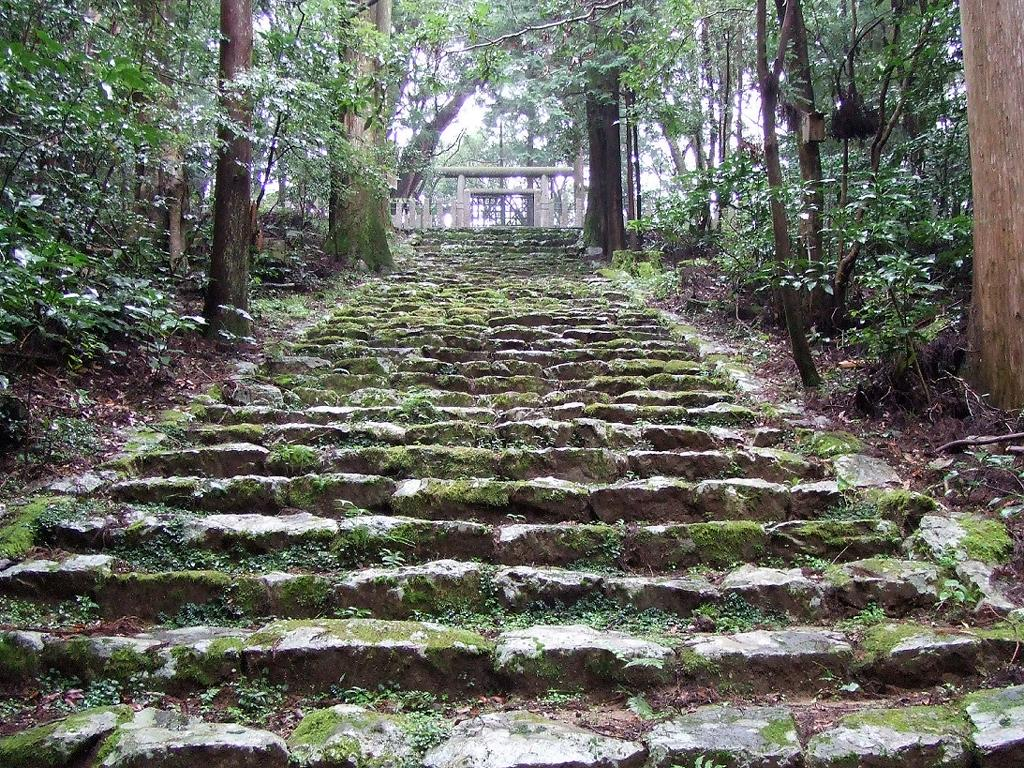
Ochi Town

== Tourism ==
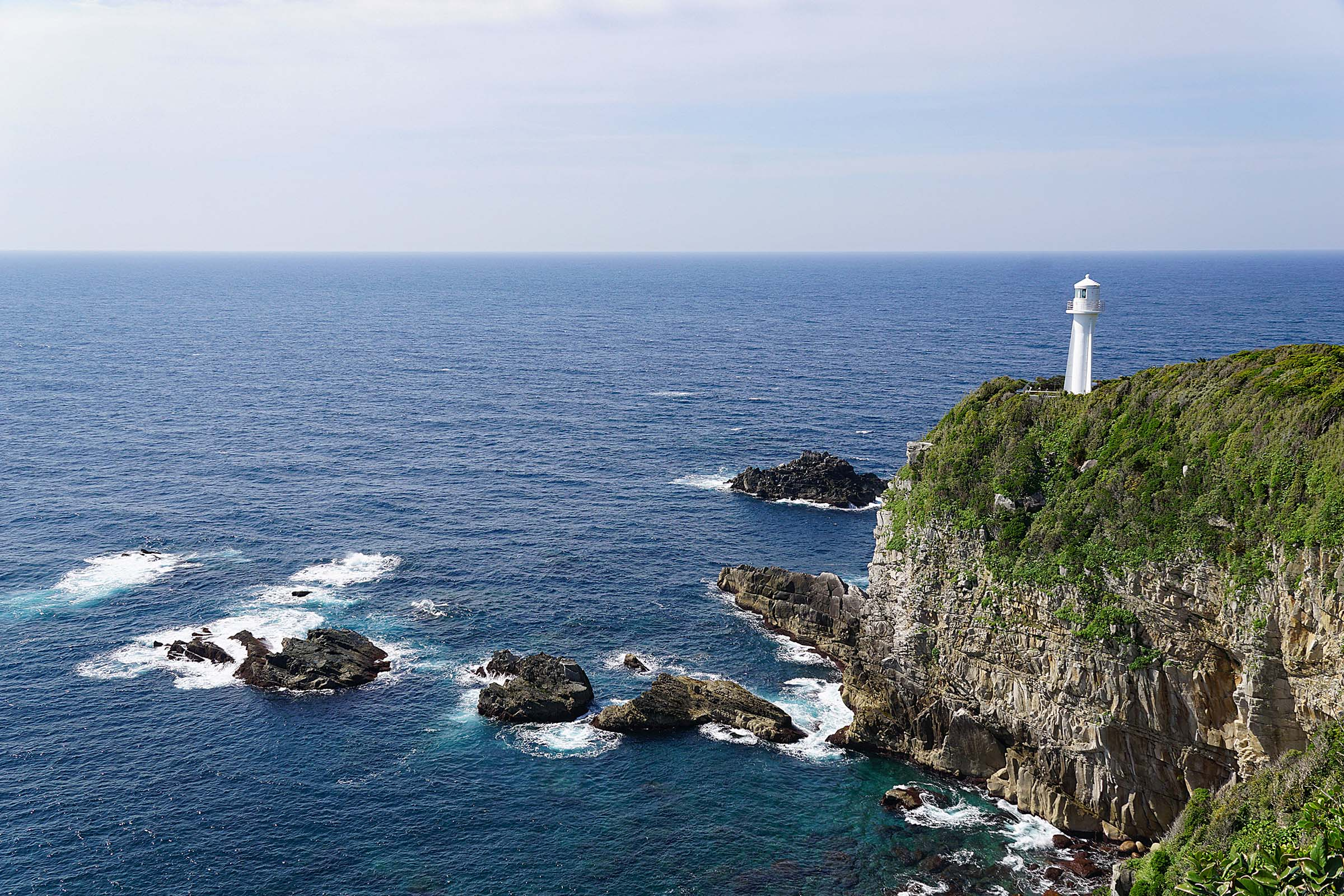
Cape of Ashizuri

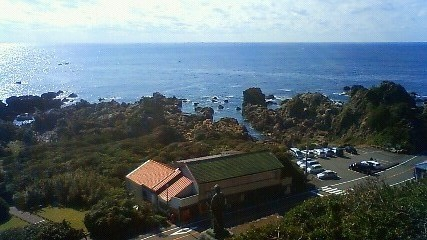
Cape of Muroto

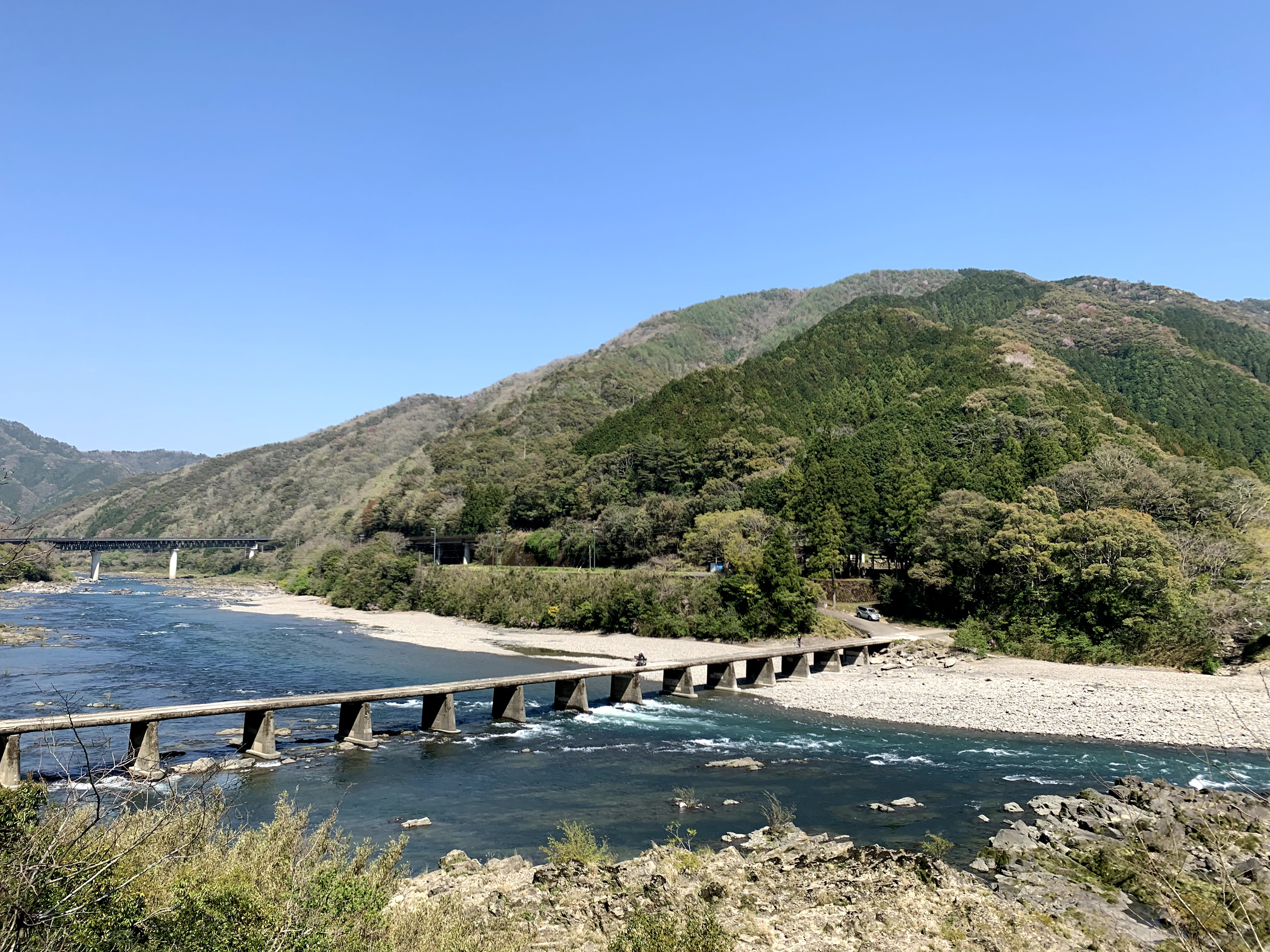
Shimanto River

- Aki Castle and samurai's residence district called Doi Kachū
- Anpanman Museum
- Godaisan
- Katsurahama
- Katsurahama Aquarium
- Kōchi Castle, one of only 12 original castles left in Japan
- Kōchi Prefectural Museum of History, Historical Museum located on Okō Castle
- Muroto Schoolhouse Aquarium
- Okō Castle, Chōsokabe clan's prime castle ruins.
- Ryūga Cave, one of Japan's top three caves
- Sakamoto Ryōma Memorial Museum
- Shimanto River, the only undammed river in Japan

== Media ==
Various movies have been set in Kōchi. These include the following:

The 1993 Studio Ghibli movie Ocean Waves (Umi ga Kikoeru).

The 2009 movie The Harimaya Bridge starring Danny Glover.

The 2013 movie Hospitality Department (Kencho Omotenashi Ka), which shows views of Kōchi Prefecture.

The 2021 movie Belle (Ryū to Sobakasu no Hime).

== Culture ==
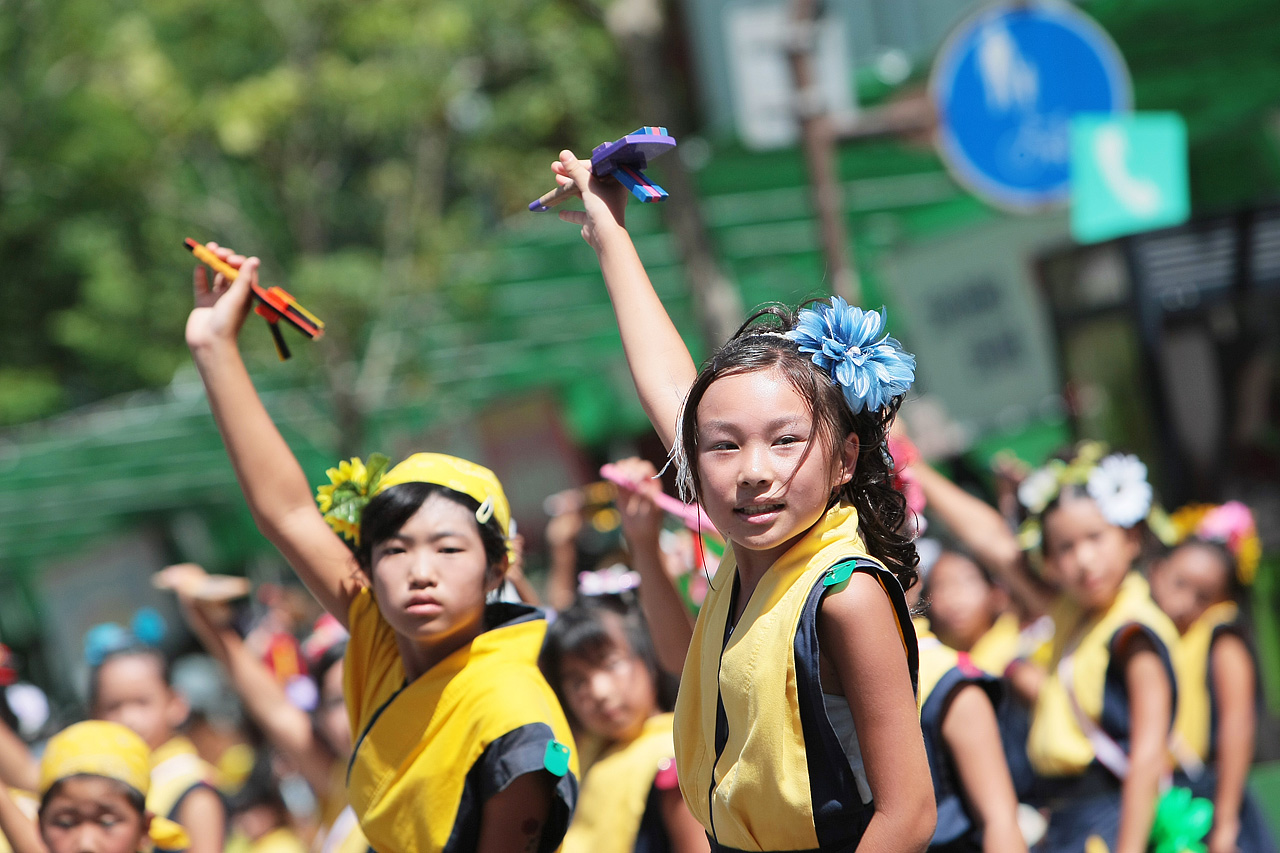
Yosakoi

=== Food ===
Like most areas of Japan, Kōchi advertises itself as specializing in a major food item, often known as meibutsu. Kōchi's is katsuo no tataki – skipjack tuna or bonito which is lightly seared. Traditionally this is done over the straw generated as a by-product of the rice harvest.

Sawachi is a term which refers to "a style of meal" in Kochi prefecture, according to Kochi-City Tourism Association. It says that the characteristic of the style of eating is "its freeness in the arrangement of food on a large dish" People eat Sawachi in the situation of "Enkai" which refers to a gathering of family, friends and relatives. They surround "Sawachi", feasts on large dishes, and take own portions by themselves. The style represents the cultural climate of Kochi Prefecture, which dislikes formal arrangements and respects freedom.

=== Festival and events ===
Festival

- Yosakoi Festival - Yosakoi (よさこい) is a unique style of dance that originated in Japan and that is performed at festivals and events all over the country.

=== Sports ===
The sports teams listed below are based in Kōchi.

Baseball

- Kōchi Fighting Dogs

Football

- Kōchi United SC

== See also ==
- Tosa Domain
