= Tosa District, Kōchi =

District in Kōchi Prefecture, Japan

Coordinates: 33.764°N 133.462°E

Tosa (土佐郡, Tosa-gun) is a district located in Kōchi Prefecture, Japan.

As of the January 1, 2005 merger but with 2003 population estimates, the district has an estimated population of 5,348 and a density of 17.4 persons per km^{2}. The total area is 307.39 km^{2}.

== Towns and villages ==
- Tosa
- Ōkawa

== Mergers ==
- On October 1, 2004, the village of Hongawa, along with the village of Gohoku, from Agawa District, merged into the expanded town of Ino, in Agawa District.
- On January 1, 2005, the villages of Kagami and Tosayama merged into the expanded city of Kōchi.
