= Mount Inamura =

Mountain in Tosa, Kōchi Prefecture, Japan

- 稲叢山
- On the summit of Mount Inamura

Highest point
- Elevation: 1,506 m (4,941 ft)
- Prominence: 1,506 m (4,941 ft)
- Coordinates: 33°44′18″N 133°22′20″E

Geography
- Location: Kōchi Prefecture, Japan

Climbing
- Easiest route: Hiking

Mount Inamura (稲叢山, Inamura-yama) is the highest mountain in Kōchi Prefecture, Japan, at 1,506 m (4,941 ft). Situated in the town of Tosa, Mount Inamura is famous for its Akebono-tsutsuji (Rhododendron pentaphyllum) flowers, which bloom during the middle of spring season (April–May).

== History ==
Mount Inamura is home to a historically-famous Shinto shrine dedicated to the fertility goddess Ama-no-Uzume. Hikers, upon reaching the summit are permitted to pay homage to the Ama-no-uzume by touching the divine phallus, made of Japanese cypress.

== See also ==
- Geography of Japan
- List of mountains and hills of Japan by height

== Views of the mountain ==
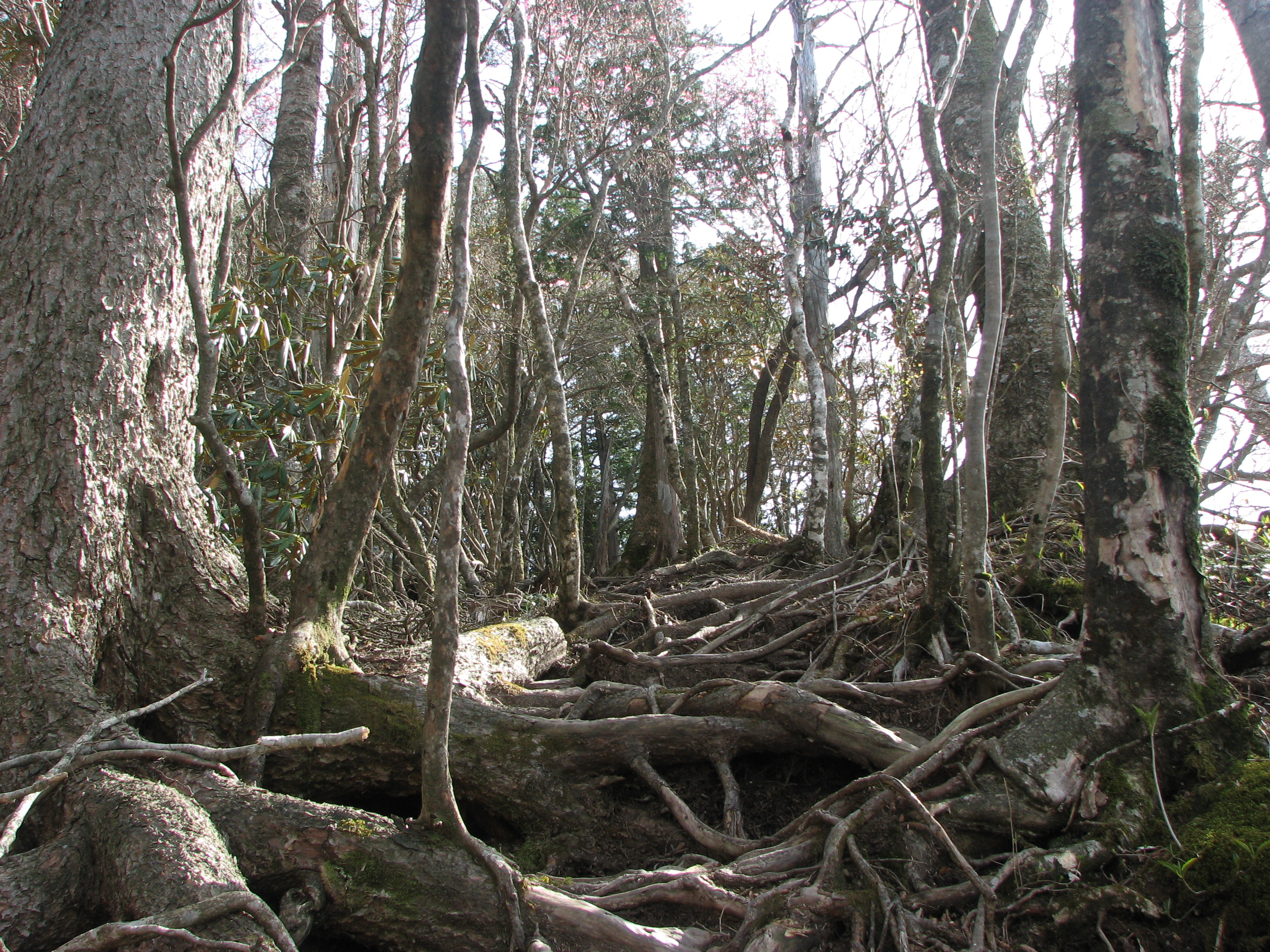
Hiking path to Mt. Inamura

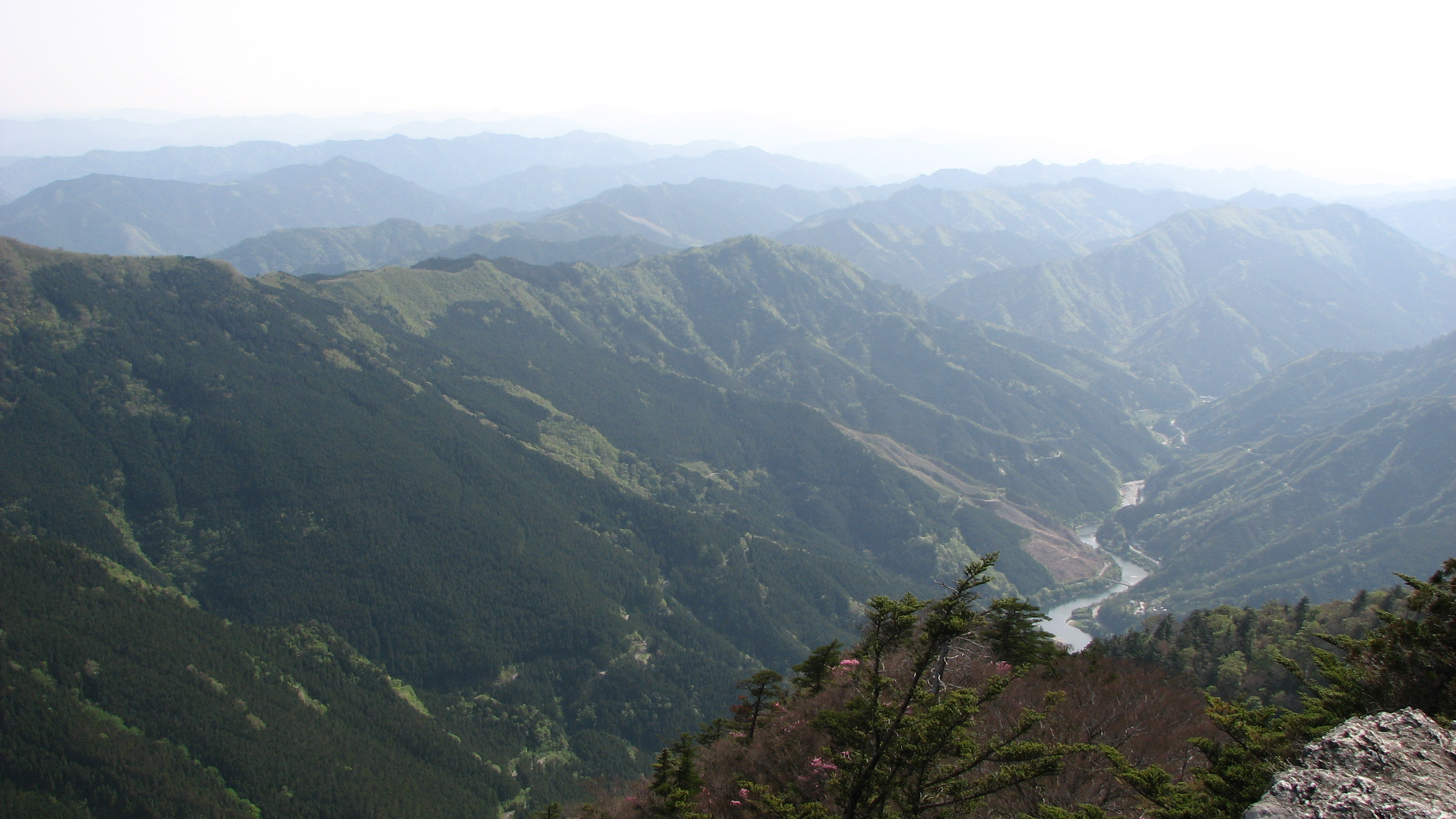
Panoramic view from the summit

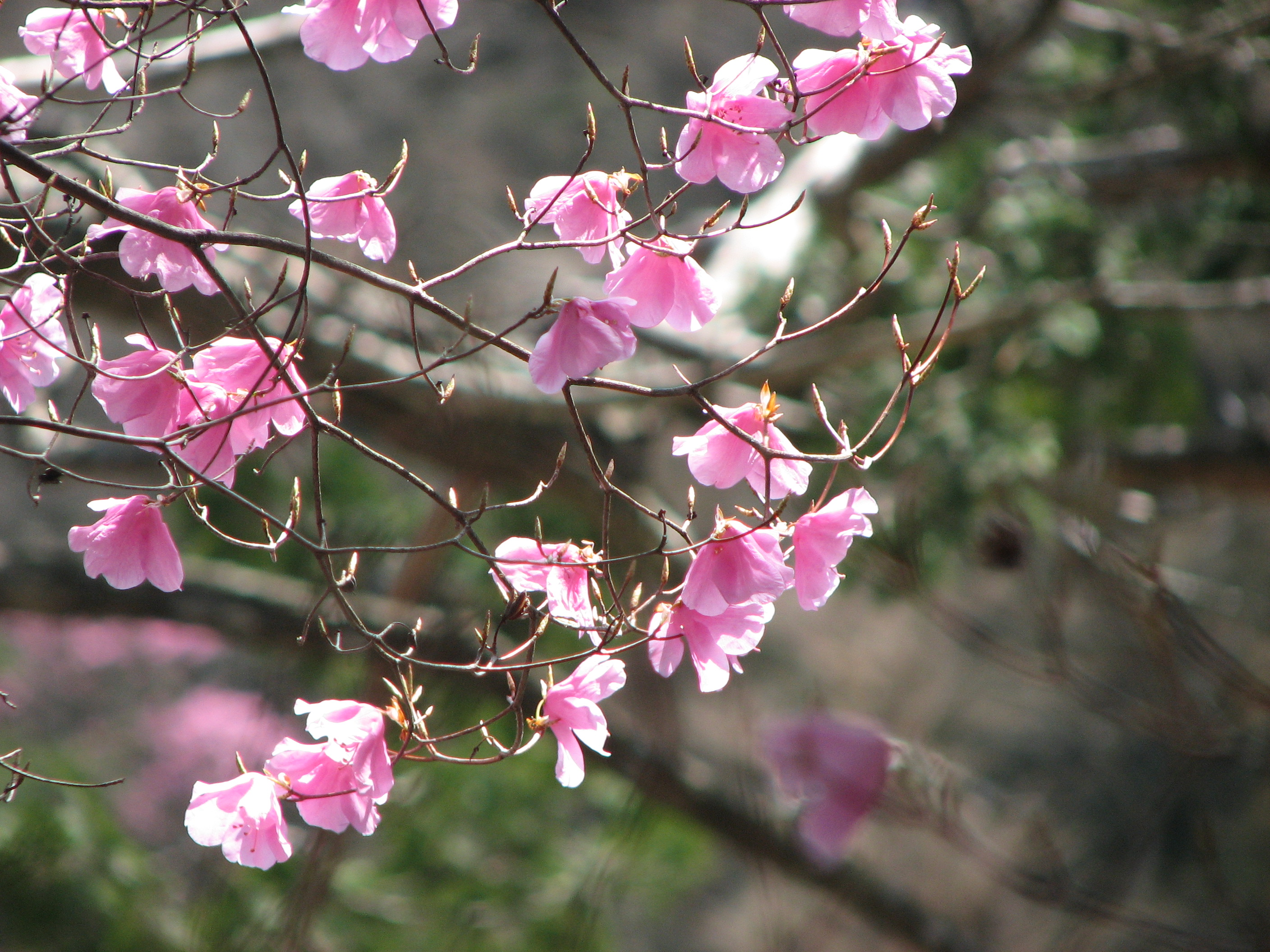
Akebono tsutsuji flowers

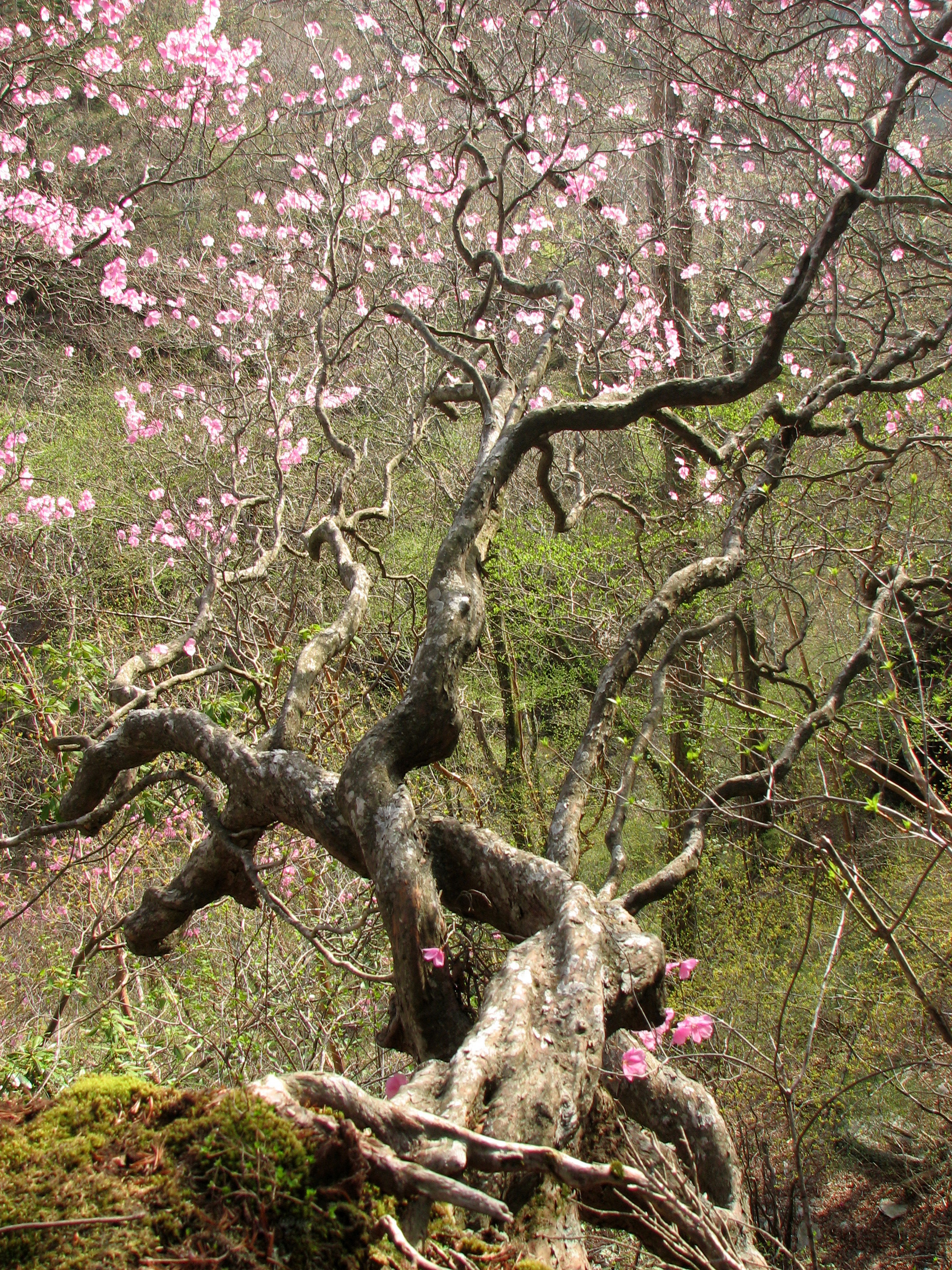
Akebono tsutsuji tree
