= Inamura (surname) =

Inamura (written: 稲村) is a Japanese surname. Notable people with the surname include:

- Ami Inamura (稲村 亜美, born 1996), Japanese gravure idol, television personality and sportscaster
- Kazumi Inamura (稲村 和美, born 1972), Japanese politician
- Narihiro Inamura (稲村 成浩, born 1971), Japanese cyclist
- Takamasa Inamura (稲村 隆正, 1923–1989), Japanese photographer
- Yūna Inamura (稲村 優奈, born 1982), Japanese voice actress
