= Sameura Dam =

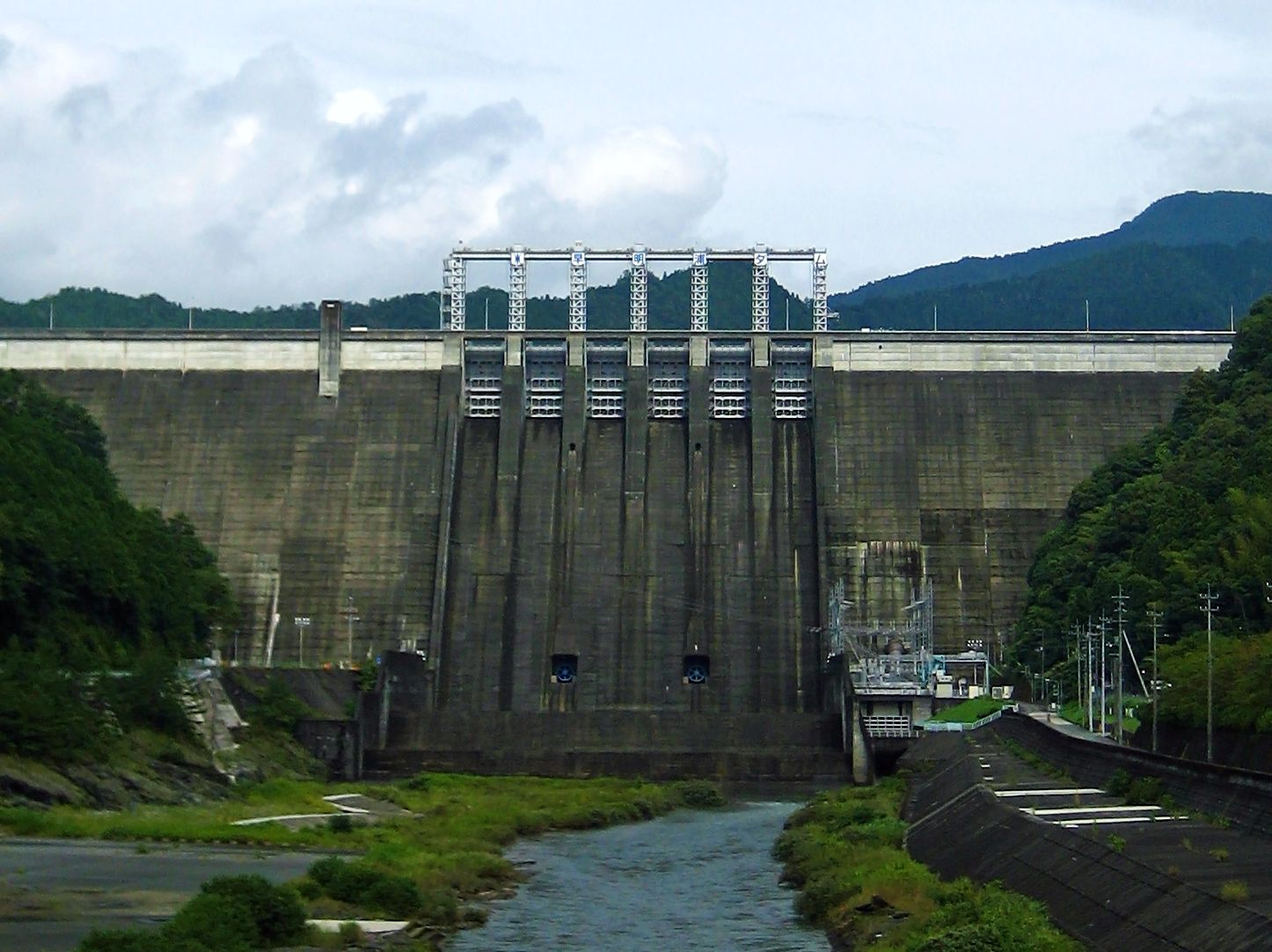
- Sameura Dam
- Official name: Sameura Dam
- Country: Japan
- Location: Motoyama and Tosa, Kōchi, Japan
- Coordinates: 33.756933°N 133.550125°E
- Construction began: 1963
- Opening date: 1975
- Operator(s): Japan Water Agency

Dam and spillways
- Impounds: Yoshino River
- Height: 106 m
- Length: 400 m

Reservoir
- Creates: Lake Sameura
- Total capacity: 316 ML
- Catchment area: 472 km^{2}
- Surface area: 750 ha

Power Station
- Installed capacity: 42 MW

The Sameura Dam (早明浦ダム Sameura-damu) is a dam on the Yoshino River on the island of Shikoku, Japan, completed in 1975. It has the largest storage capacity in Shikoku. The dam holds back a reservoir, named Lake Sameura (さめうら湖 Sameura-ko)

The dam is used for flood control, as a source of irrigation, and to provide tap water to surrounding areas. It also produces electricity using hydropower. The plant can generate 42 MW.

== 1994 Grumman A-6 Intruder Incident ==
- On October 14, 1994, a US Navy training plane, the Grumman A-6 Intruder, crashed near the reservoir. The A-6 Intruder took off from NAF Atsugi in Kanagawa Prefecture, and was headed towards MCAS Iwakuni in Yamaguchi Prefecture. The plane crashed on a low-level flight following a river when it got to a bend and couldn't get out. The wing sliced into the water upon a reverse. Both pilots, Lt. Eric A. Hamm and B/N John J. Dunne, Jr., were killed in the crash.

== Water Supply Crisis of 2005 ==
- The Sameura Dam supplies water to Takamatsu, Kagawa Prefecture and Tokushima Prefecture. In 2005, because of little rainfall and a series of dry spells from April to June, the Shikoku Region was hit by a very serious drought and Lake Sameura dried up twice. Luckily, they could get over this crisis thanks to the heavy rain brought Typhoon Nabi.
