= Shikoku Mountains =

Mountain range in Shikoku, Japan

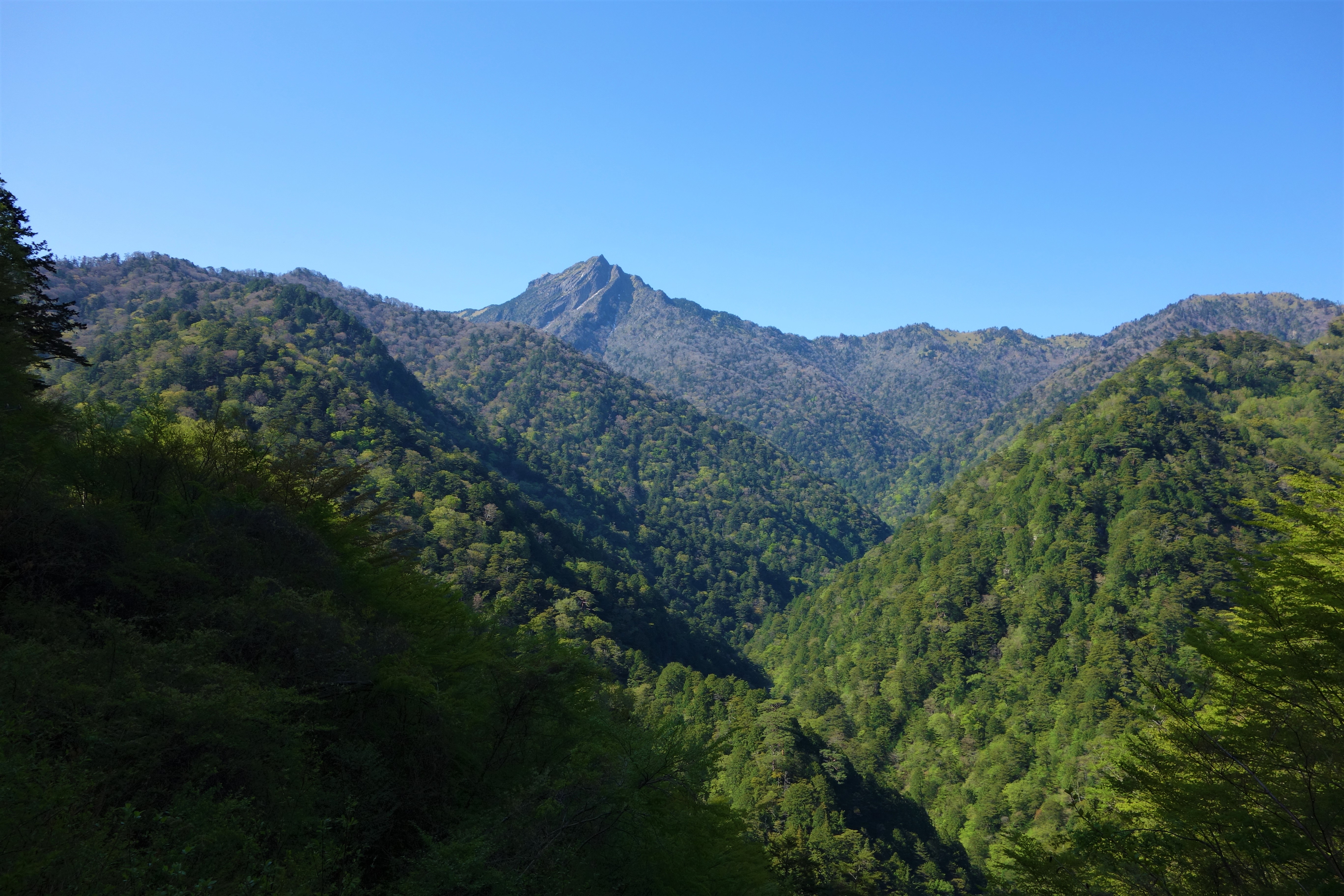
Mount Ishizuchi

Geofeatures map of Shikoku

The Shikoku Mountains (Japanese: 四国山地) are a mountain range that runs from east to west in the central part of Shikoku in Japan. The length of the mountain range is about 250 km (160 mi). The highest peak in the mountain range is Mount Ishizuchi with a height of 1,984m.
