= List of historic sites of Japan (Kōchi) =

This list is of the historic sites of Japan located within the Prefecture of Kōchi.

== National Historic Sites ==
As of 3 January 2026, thirteen Sites have been designated as being of national significance.

| Site | Municipality | Comments | Image | Coordinates | Type | Ref. |
|---|---|---|---|---|---|---|
| Okō Castle ruins 岡豊城跡; Okō-jo ato | Nankoku | Muromachi period castle ruins | | 33°35′43″N 133°37′21″E | 2 | |
| Kōchi Castle Site 高知城跡; Kōchi-jo ato | Kōchi | Edo period castle | | 33°33′39″N 133°31′52″E | 2 | |
| Sukumo Shell Mound 宿毛貝塚; Sukumo kaizuka | Sukumo | Jōmon period shell midden | | 32°56′14″N 132°42′55″E | 1 | |
| Tani Shigetō grave 谷重遠墓; Tani Shigetō no haka | Kami | Edo period Confucian scholar | | 33°36′49″N 133°40′50″E | 7 | |
| Tosa Kokubun-ji Site 土佐国分寺跡; Tosa Kokubunji ato | Nankoku | Nara period provincial temple of Tosa Province; 29th temple of the Shikoku pilgrimage | | 33°35′55″N 133°38′24″E | 3 | |
| Tosa Domain Yamauchi clan cemetery 土佐藩主山内家墓所; Tosa-han-shu Yamauchi-ke bosho | Kōchi | Edo period daimyo cemetery | | 33°33′32″N 133°31′53″E | 7 | |
| Tosa Domain Battery Site 土佐藩砲台跡; Tosa-han hōdai ato | Susaki | Bakumatsu period fortifications | | 33°23′16″N 133°17′02″E | 2 | |
| Tosa Henro-michi 土佐遍路道; Tosa henro-michi | Tosa | pilgrimage route; includes Shōryū-ji michi (青龍寺道) | | 33°29′45″N 133°25′31″E | 3, 6 | |
| Hie temple ruins pagoda ruins 比江廃寺塔跡; Hie haiji tō ato | Nankoku | Hakohō period temple ruins | | 33°36′12″N 133°39′03″E | 3 | |
| Fudō-ga-Iwaya Cave 不動ガ岩屋洞窟; Fudō-ga-Iwaya dōkutsu | Sakawa | Jomon period settlement trace | | 33°29′02″N 133°15′45″E | 1 | |
| Takechi Hanpeita Former Residence and Grave 武市半平太旧宅および墓; Takechi Hanpeita kyū-taku oyobi haka | Kōchi | Bakumatsu period political theorist | | 33°32′16″N 133°36′13″E | 7 | |
| Ryūga Cave 龍河洞; Ryūga-dō | Kami | Yayoi period settlement trace, also a Natural Monument | | 33°36′12″N 133°44′44″E | 1 | |
| Nonaka Haiji Site 野中廃寺跡; Nonaka haiji ato | Nankoku | | | 33°34′42″N 133°38′24″E | 3 | |

== Prefectural Historic Sites ==
As of 1 May 2025, thirty-one Sites have been designated as being of prefectural importance.

| Site | Municipality | Comments | Image | Coordinates | Type | Ref. |
|---|---|---|---|---|---|---|
| Mount Akagi 赤鬼山; Akagi-yama | Kōchi | | | 33°33′13″N 133°28′54″E | | |
| Asakura Kofun 朝倉古墳; Asakura kofun | Kōchi | | | 33°33′12″N 133°28′54″E | | |
| Yamada Weir 山田堰; Yamada-zeki | Kami | | | 33°36′42″N 133°42′44″E | | |
| Mount Yokokura 横倉山; Yokokura-yama | Ochi | | | 33°32′04″N 133°14′29″E | | |
| Sakihama Sutra Mound 佐喜浜の経塚; Sakihama no kyōzuka | Muroto | | | 33°23′39″N 134°12′16″E | | |
| 23 Samurai Graves 二十三士墓; Nijūsan shi no haka | Tano | | | 33°25′43″N 134°00′46″E | | |
| Aki Kunitora Grave 安芸国虎墓; Aki Kunitora no haka | Aki | | | 33°30′30″N 133°53′42″E | | |
| Ki no Natsui Residence Site 紀夏井邸跡; Ki no Natsui yashiki ato | Kōnan | | | 33°35′02″N 133°42′19″E | | |
| Asano Chikatada Grave 津野親忠墓; Asano Chikatada no haka | Kami | | | 33°34′58″N 133°40′40″E | | |
| Mount Kizen 帰全山; Kizen-zan | Motoyama | | | 33°45′29″N 133°35′42″E | | |
| Kohasu Kofun 小蓮古墳; Kohasu kofun | Nankoku | | | 33°35′58″N 133°37′09″E | | |
| Gyūkō-an Site 吸江庵跡; Gyūkōan ato | Kōchi | | | 33°32′50″N 133°34′15″E | | |
| Asakura Castle Site 朝倉城跡; Asakura-jō seki | Kōchi | | | 33°32′58″N 133°28′48″E | | |
| Chōsokabe Motochika Grave 長宗我部元親墓; Chōsokabe Motochika no haka | Kōchi | | | 33°29′50″N 133°33′11″E | | |
| Tani Jichū Grave 谷時中墓; Tani Jichū no haka | Kōchi | | | 33°31′10″N 133°32′47″E | | |
| Nangaku Birthplace 南学発祥地; Nangaku hassōnchi | Kōchi | | | 33°30′27″N 133°27′58″E | | |
| Takaoka Shinnō Tō 高岳親王塔; Takaoka Shinnō tō | Tosa | in the grounds of Kiyotaki-ji (清瀧寺) | | 33°30′45″N 133°24′34″E | | |
| Tanokuchi Kofun 田ノ口古墳; Tanokuchi kofun | Kuroshio | | | 33°00′57″N 132°59′35″E | | |
| Arii Shōji Grave 有井庄司墓; Arii Shōji no haka | Kuroshio | | | 33°02′27″N 133°04′18″E | | |
| Ichijō Norifusa Grave 一条教房墓; Ichijō Norifusa no haka | Shimanto | | | 32°59′55″N 132°55′47″E | | |
| Kashiwajima Stone Dike 柏島石堤; Kashiwajima sekitei | Ōtsuki | | | 32°46′02″N 132°37′44″E | | |
| Kamochi Masazumi Residence Site 鹿持雅澄邸跡; Kamochi Masazumi yashiki ato | Kōchi | | | 33°34′01″N 133°30′27″E | | |
| Tosa Provincial Government Offices Site 土佐国衙跡; Tosa kokuga ato | Nankoku | | | 33°36′00″N 133°38′55″E | | |
| Nakaoka Shintarō Residence Site 中岡慎太郎宅跡; Nakaoka Shintarō taku ato | Kitagawa | | | 33°27′26″N 134°03′22″E | | |
| Yoshimura Toratarō Residence Site 吉村虎太郎宅跡; Yoshimura Toratarō taku ato | Tsuno | | | 33°24′41″N 133°01′23″E | | |
| Nōsayama Sanjō Kiln Site 能茶山山上窯跡; Nōsayama Sanjō kama ato | Kōchi | | | 33°32′43″N 133°30′10″E | | |
| Hōkyō-ji Site 宝鏡寺 (香宗我部菩提寺) 跡 Hōkyōji (Kōsogabe Bodaiji) ato | Kōnan | | | 33°33′19″N 133°43′11″E | | |
| Lotus Sutra Tower (Inscribed 1684) 貞亨元年銘法華経塔 (五台山の経塔); Teikyō gannen-mei hokekyō tō (Godaisan no keitō) | Kōchi | | | 33°32′48″N 133°34′39″E | | |
| Lotus Sutra Tower (Inscribed 1684) 貞亨元年銘法華経 (宿毛の経塔); Teikyō gannen-mei hokekyō (Sukumo no keitō) | Sukumo | | | 32°57′02″N 132°46′11″E | | |
| Lotus Sutra Tower (Inscribed 1684) 貞亨元年銘法華経 (甲浦の経塔); Teikyō gannen-mei hokekyō (Kannoura no keitō) | Tōyō | | | 33°32′56″N 134°17′48″E | | |
| Sakamoto Site Kiln Site 坂本遺跡窯跡; Sakamoto iseki kama ato | Shimanto | | | 32°58′29″N 132°56′01″E | | |

== Municipal Historic Sites ==
As of 1 May 2025, a further three hundred and thirty-eight Sites have been designated as being of municipal importance.

== See also ==
- Cultural Properties of Japan
- Tosa Province
- List of Cultural Properties of Japan - paintings (Kōchi)
- List of Places of Scenic Beauty of Japan (Kōchi)
