= Sukumo Shell Mound =

Sukumo Shell Midden
- 宿毛貝塚 (Japanese)
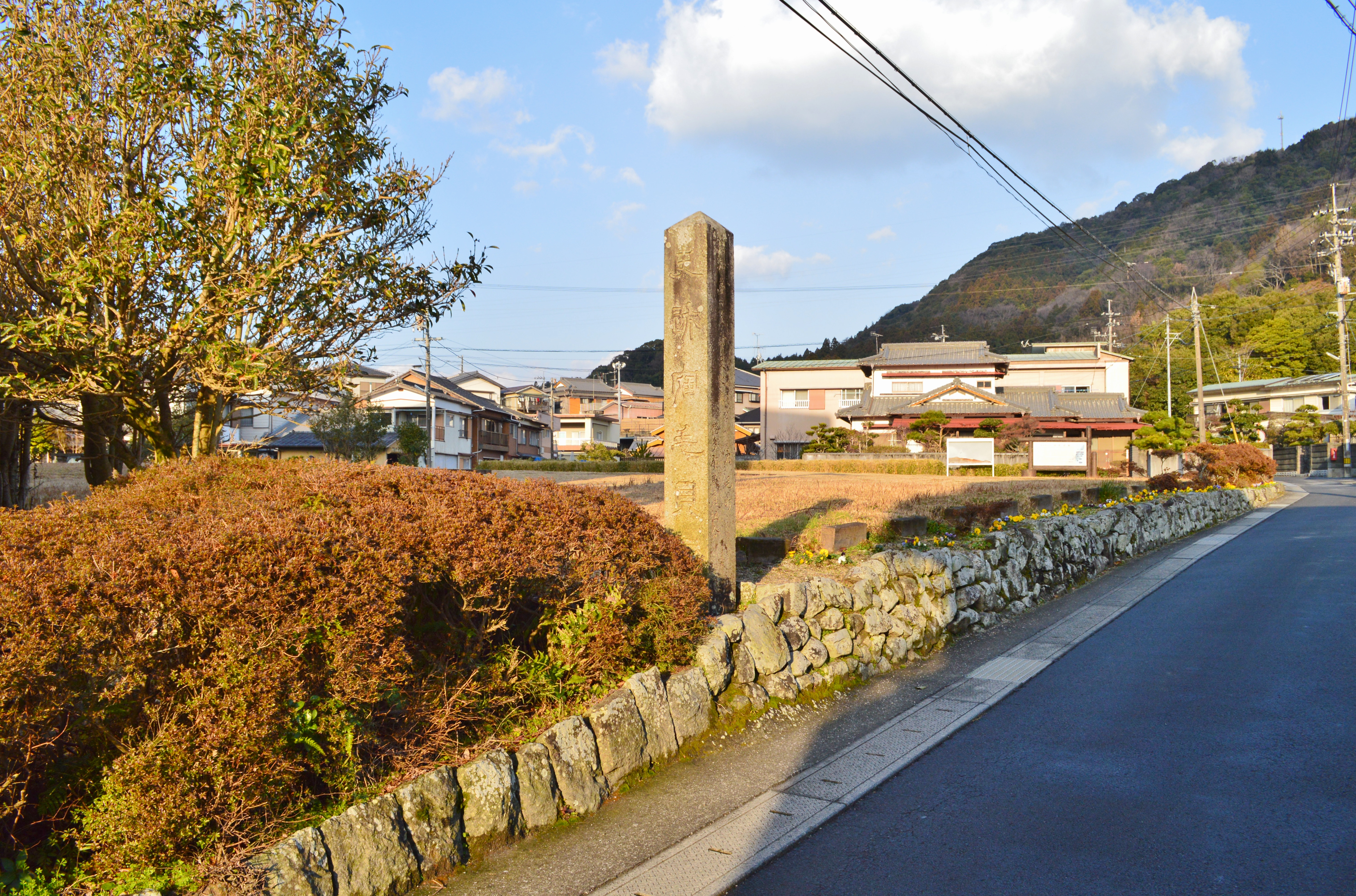
- Sukumo Shell Midden

- Sukumo Shell Midden Sukumo Shell Mound (Japan)
- Interactive map of Sukumo Shell Midden
- 32°56′14″N 132°42′55″E
- Type: shell midden
- Periods: Jōmon period
- Location: Sukumo, Kōchi, Japan
- Region: Shikoku

Site notes
- Public access: Yes (no public facilities)

The Sukumo Shell Midden (宿毛貝塚, Sukumo kaizuka) is an archaeological site in the city of Sukumo, Kōchi Prefecture, on the island of Shikoku in Japan. It consists of a pair of late Jōmon period shell middens. The middens were designated a National Historic Site of Japan in 1957.

== Overview ==
During the Jōmon period (approximately 3500 BC), sea levels were five to six meters higher than at present, and the ambient temperature was also 2 deg C higher. During this period, Shikoku was inhabited by the Jōmon people, many of whom lived in coastal settlements. The middens associated with such settlements contain bone, botanical material, mollusc shells, sherds, lithics, and other artifacts and ecofacts associated with the now-vanished inhabitants, and these features, provide a useful source into the diets and habits of Jōmon society. Most of such middens are found along the Pacific coast of Japan.

The location of this shell midden is on a plateau at the foot of Mount Ganjoji, to the northwest of the city center. The existence of shell middens on the gentle slope facing south of Sukumo Bay has been known since antiquity, but came to the attention of academia only in 1891, when they were first excavated. The mounds are located approximately 60 meters apart and form the largest known shell midden in Shikoku, both in terms of size and in number of excavated artifacts. The site was excavated again in 1949, 1985-1986 and in 1996; however, traces of the settlement which was once associated with this midden have yet to be discovered. The shell layer is approximately 70-centimeters thick, and consists of reef and open sea clam shells in its lower layers and coastal and muddy sea shells (much as mussels) in its upper layers. Jōmon pottery, stone arrowheads and stone hoes, and bone jewelry have been found in the upper layers, along with a number of Jōmon period human remains.

The site is about five minutes by car from Tosa Kuroshio Railway Sukumo Station.

== See also ==
- List of Historic Sites of Japan (Kōchi)
