= Kiyotaki-ji =

- 清瀧寺
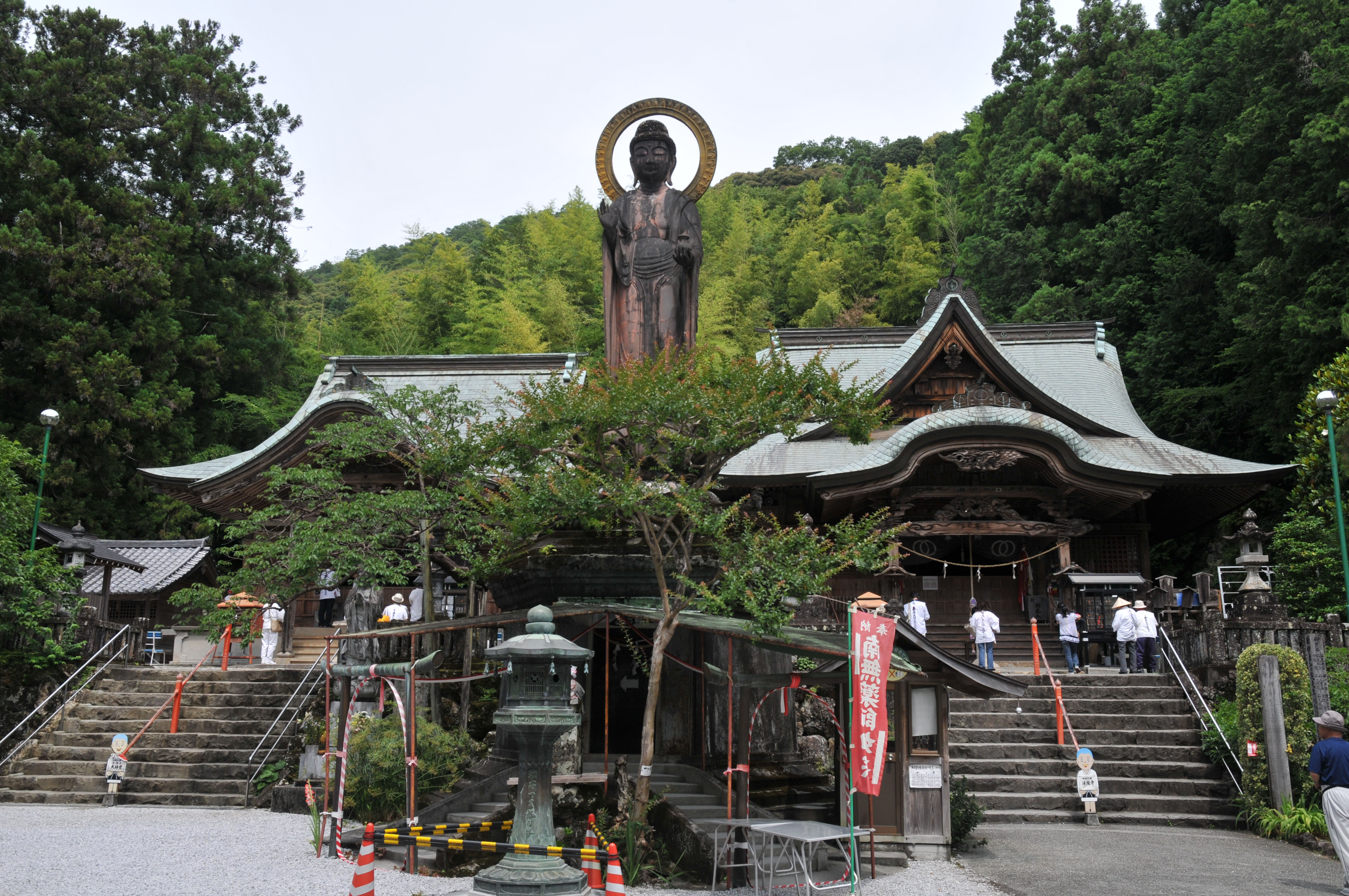

Religion
- Affiliation: Shingon

Location
- Location: Kōchi-ken
- Country: Japan
- Interactive map of Kiyotaki-ji
- Coordinates: 33.5125°N 133.4095°E

Website
- http://www.88shikokuhenro.jp/35kiyotakiji/

Kiyotaki-ji is a Shingon Buddhist Temple located in Tosa, Kōchi, Japan. It is the 35th temple of the Shikoku Pilgrimage. The Honzon of Kiyotaki-ji is Bhaisajyaguru.

== History ==
According to the temple records, during the 7th year of the Yoro period (723) Gyoki carved the Honzon Bhaisajyaguru and named the temple Keisanmitsu-in Takumoku-ji. (景山密院繹木寺(けいさんみついんたくもくじ)). Later, when Kukai was proselytizing by the temple, upon completing a seven day prayer for good harvest, he struck his staff upon the prayer podium, and spring water burst out creating a pond as reflective as a mirror. Thus, the name of the temple was changed to Iouzankagamiike-in Kiyotaki-ji (醫王山鏡池院清瀧寺(いおうざんかがみいけいんきよたきじ) in reference to the clear waters, roughly translated as “Iou mountain’s mirror pond and clear waterfall temple”.

The third son of Emperor Heizei, Takaoka Shinno became a pupil of Kukai after the Kusuko Incident. During the third year of the Jogan era (861), he built a grave to pray for his next life at the temple.

During the Edo period the temple flourished, but by the 4th year of the Meiji era (1871) the temple was in ruins and not restored until 1880.
