= Hagiko Umezu =

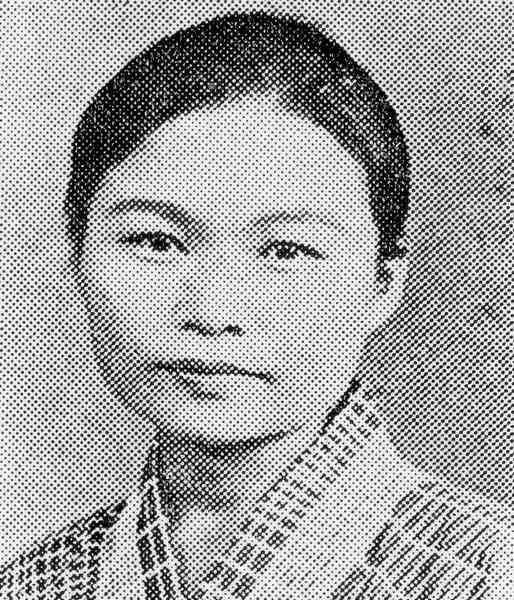
- Umezu in 1933
- Born: Hagiko Nakahira; April 22, 1904; Takaoka, Japan
- Died: October 8, 1989 (aged 85)
- Occupation: trade unionist

Hagiko Umezu (Japanese: 梅津はぎ子, romanized: Umezu Hagiko; April 22, 1904 – October 8, 1989) was a Japanese trade unionist. Having experienced harsh working conditions in textile factories, she became an advocate for her fellow female textile workers.

== Biography ==
Hagiko Umezu was born Hagiko Nakahira (Japanese: 中平はぎ子) in the Japanese village of Takaoka (now Tosa) in 1904. She grew up in a very poor family. Her parents divorced when she was 4 years old, and she was adopted by a relative. She then became a domestic worker at a very young age.

At age 17, facing the prospect of an arranged marriage, she ran away from home and found a job at Fuji Boseki's textile mill in Hodogaya. The mill's workforce at the time was largely made up of teenage girls, who worked long hours for low pay. In 1923, the factory collapsed in the Great Kantō Earthquake, killing hundreds of workers, but she survived and returned to her job there after it reopened.

After hearing of strikes at other textile plants, she became increasingly engaged with the fight for labor rights. At one point, the company's official magazine published an article praising her efficiency, and she was given the chance to address her fellow female workers. Rather than parroting the company line, she took this opportunity to call for them to become conscious of their own exploitation. She led a strike at her own factory, and she was detained by police in response to her role.

Umezu persisted in union organizing. At the Hyōgikai trade union federation's April 1926 convention, she pushed for women's representation in the labor movement, and she gained recognition for her speech at a May Day rally in Yokohama the following month. She pawned her own kimonos for cash to fund her labor activism. Eventually, she was fired from the mill, and despite trying to work at other factories under pseudonyms, she was quickly found out and fired each time due to police surveillance of her activities.

Due to this inability to secure work, she relocated to Tokyo in late 1926. There, she continued to organize in the labor movement, as well as the consumer cooperative movement and the contraceptive movement. She was arrested several more times, including during the March 15 incident in 1928.

She was married to Shiro Umezu, whom she'd met through the labor movement. After the birth of their eldest son, Hagiko would bring the child with her during her organizing activities, and he even spent time in jail with her.

After World War II, she joined the Japanese Communist Party and continued organizing locally. Having remained engaged into her 70s, she died in 1989, at age 85.
