= Tosa Domain Yamauchi clan cemetery =

Cemetery in Kōchi Prefecture, Japan

- 土佐藩主山内家墓所
- Interactive map of Tosa Domain Yamauchi clan cemetery

Details
- Established: 1661
- Location: Kōchi, Kōchi Prefecture
- Country: Japan
- Coordinates: 33°33′32″N 133°31′53″E
- Type: daimyō cemetery
- Footnotes: National Historic Site of Japan

The Tosa Domain Yamauchi clan cemetery (土佐藩主山内家墓所, Tosa-han-shu Yamauchi-ke bosho) refers to a site located in the city of Kōchi, Kōchi Prefecture, Japan containing the graves of the Yamauchi clan, the daimyō of Tosa Domain under the Edo Period Tokugawa shogunate. The cemetery was designated a National Historic Site in 2016.

== Background ==
The Yamauchi clan under Yamauchi Kazutoyo served Oda Nobunaga and later Toyotomi Hideyoshi, under whom he had been entrusted with Kakegawa Castle in Tōtōmi Province. Following the Battle of Sekigahara, Tokugawa Ieyoshi ordered him to take control of Tosa Province as daimyō of the newly created Tosa Domain, with a nominal kokudaka of 202,600 koku. While this was a huge promotion, the area was controlled by retainers of the dispossessed Chōsokabe clan who were extremely hostile to the new regime. Kazutoyo came in with only 158 mounted men, and was able to pacify his new domain by a combination of "ruse and violence ... After his death at Kōchi Castle in 1605, he was buried at the temple of Nichirinzan Shinnyō-ji in the city. The temple is located at the northern foot of Mt. Fudeyama, a hill along the right bank of the Kagami River.

Kazutoyo's successors followed suit. The second daimyō Yamauchi Tadayoshi also died in Kochi and was buried next to his father. However, the third daimyō, Yamauchi Tadatoyo, died in Edo, and a decision was made to return his remains to Kōchi. Using this as a precedent, all subsequent daimyō would be returned this cemetery even if they died in Edo. The fourth daimyō, Yamauchi Toyomasa, expanded the cemetery in 1669 to 130 meters from north-to-south and 200 meters from east-to-west. It now contains the tombs of every daimyō of Tosa Domain (with the exception of the 15th daimyō, Yamauchi Yōdō), many of their children, wives, and concubines.

From 2009 to 2012, the Tosa Yamauchi Family Treasury and Archives conducted a literature survey and archaeological excavation of the cemetery and tombs. The cemetery extends approximately 130 meters north–south and 200 meters east–west. It contains the graves of 15 daimyō, two lawful wives, one concubine, and 15 children. The grave of the first generation Kazutoyo is on the top level, the grave areas of successive feudal lords are placed on the middle level, and the grave areas of wives and children are placed on the bottom level. The style of the gravestones evolved over time; most are from three to five meters high, accompanied by two-meter stone tōrō lanterns, and graves of the 4th, 7th, 9th and 11th daimyō have large cenotaphs engraved with the history of their tenure. During the excavation, surveys were conducted with the aim of confirming the extent of the burial area and clarifying the structure and dimensions of any foundations for memorial chapels. Documentary historical materials describing the funeral of each daimyō remain, confirming that the current cemetery has not undergone any major changes since the Edo Period.

== See also ==
- List of Historic Sites of Japan (Kōchi)
