= Tosa Kokubun-ji =

Buddhist temple in Nankoku, Kochi, Japan

- 土佐国分寺
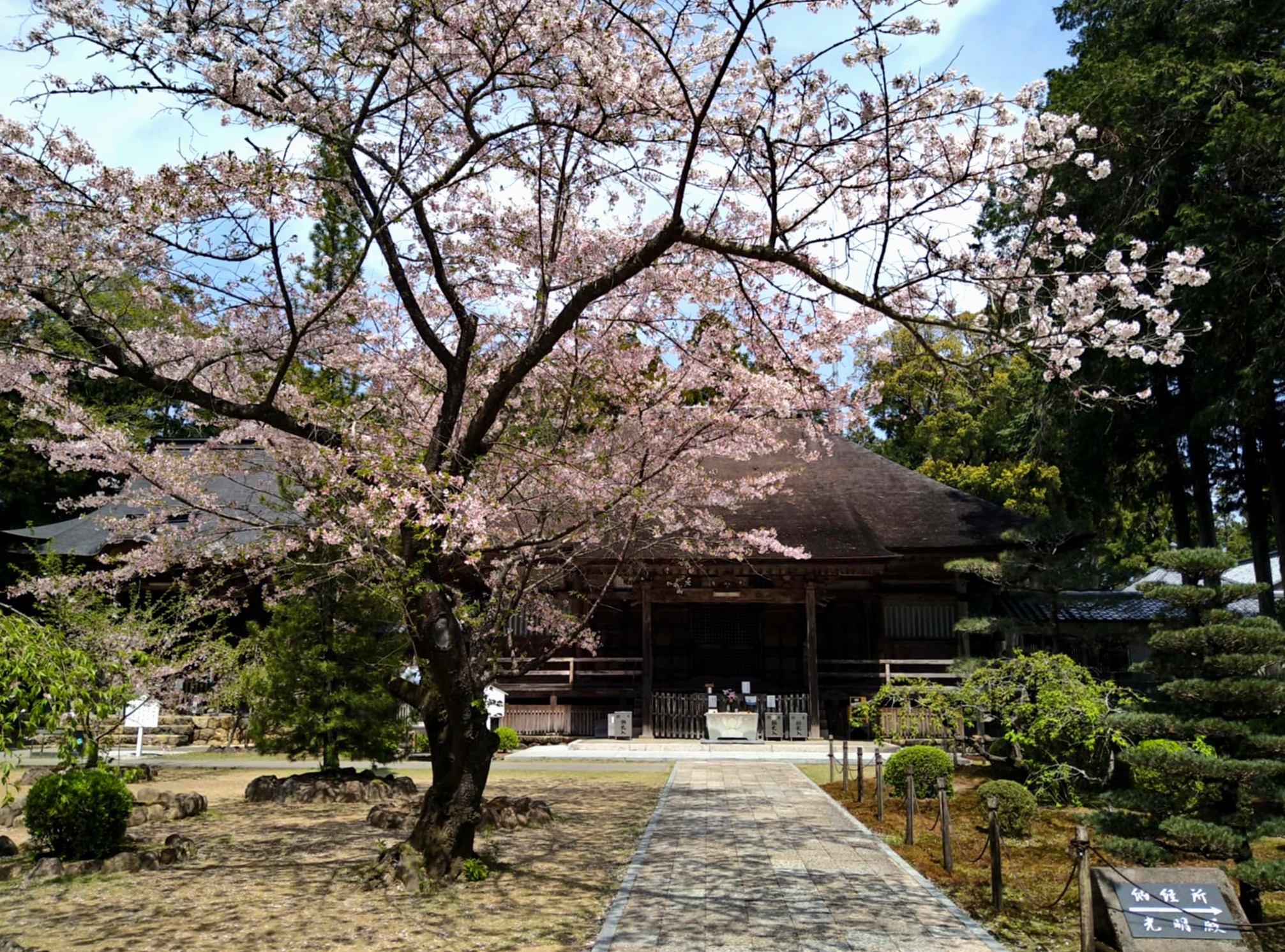
- Kondō and Daishi-do

- Tosa Kokubun-ji Tosa Kokubun-ji (Japan)

Religion
- Affiliation: Buddhist
- Deity: Senjū Kannon
- Rite: Shingon-shū Chisan-ha

Location
- Location: 546, Kokubun-cho, Nankoku-shi, Kōchi-ken
- Country: Japan
- Interactive map of Tosa Kokubun-ji
- Coordinates: 33°35′55.3″N 133°38′25.5″E

Architecture
- Founder: c.Gyōki
- Completed: c.741

Website
- Official website
- National Important Cultural Property National Historic Site of Japan

Tosa Kokubun-ji (土佐国分寺) is a Buddhist temple located in the city of Nankoku, Kōchi Prefecture, Japan. It belongs to the Shingon-shū Chisan-ha sect, and its honzon is a statue of Senjū Kannon Bosatsu (Sahasrabhuja). Its full name is Mani-zan Hōzō-in Kokubun-ji (摩尼山宝蔵院国分寺). It is the successor to the Nara period provincial temple of former Tosa Province and Temple 29 on the Shikoku 88 temple pilgrimage. The precincts were designated a National Historic Site in 1922.

== History ==
The Shoku Nihongi records that in 741, as the country recovered from a major smallpox epidemic, Emperor Shōmu ordered that a monastery and nunnery be established in every province, the kokubunji (国分寺). These temples were built to a semi-standardized template, and served both to spread Buddhist orthodoxy to the provinces, and to emphasize the power of the Nara period centralized government under the Ritsuryō system.

The exact circumstances of the Tosa Kokubun-ji's foundation are uncertain. According to temple legend, ite was founded in 741 by Gyōki, who carved the Senjū Kannon Bodhisattva and enshrined it as the principal image. Later, in 815, Kūkai carved a statue of Bishamonten and enshrined it in the inner sanctuary. He also practiced the secret teachings of Hoshi-ku, and the temple became the main dōjō for these esoteric Buddhism practices, and the statue of Kōbō Daishi at the temple is still called the "Hoshi-ku Daishi." It later became a Shingon Buddhist temple around that time. The temple first appears in historical documentation, in the Shoku Nihongi, which records that in 756 Buddhist implements were bestowed on the provincial temples of 26 provinces, including Tosa. The temple is located along the right bank of the Kokubu River, which meanders southwest through the central northern part of the Kōchi Plain. The area around Tosa Kokubun-ji was the location of the provincial government office of Tosa Province, and was the location to which Ki no Tsurayuki, the author of "Tosa Nikki" spent four years as provincial governor. The site of the provincial government office is located a 15-minute walk from the Tosa Kokubun-ji.

Archaeological excavations have been carried out several times since 1977, and the unearthing of roof tile mounds, heated tiles, and earthenware revealed that the original building was destroyed by fire in the late Heian period. On the south side of the temple grounds, the remains of the stone foundation buildings of the east and west wings were discovered, and a group of post-hole buildings thought to be monks' quarters were discovered to the north of the current main hall, and post-hole buildings, walls, and ditches were confirmed further north of the current temple grounds.

The temple was burned down many times during wars, but in 1558, the main hall was rebuilt by Chōsokabe Kunichika and Chōsokabe Motochika. In 1655, the second daimyō of Tosa Domain under the Tokugawa shogunate, Yamauchi Tadayoshi, donated the Sanmon. The Kondō of the temple was rebuilt in 1558 by Chōsokabe Motochika and is a nationally designated Important Cultural Property (ICP). It houses two statues of Yakushi Nyorai, one from the Heian period and one from the Kamakura period, both of which are also ICPs. The temple's bonshō dates from the early Heian period and is the oldest temple bell in Kochi Prefecture. It is also an ICP.

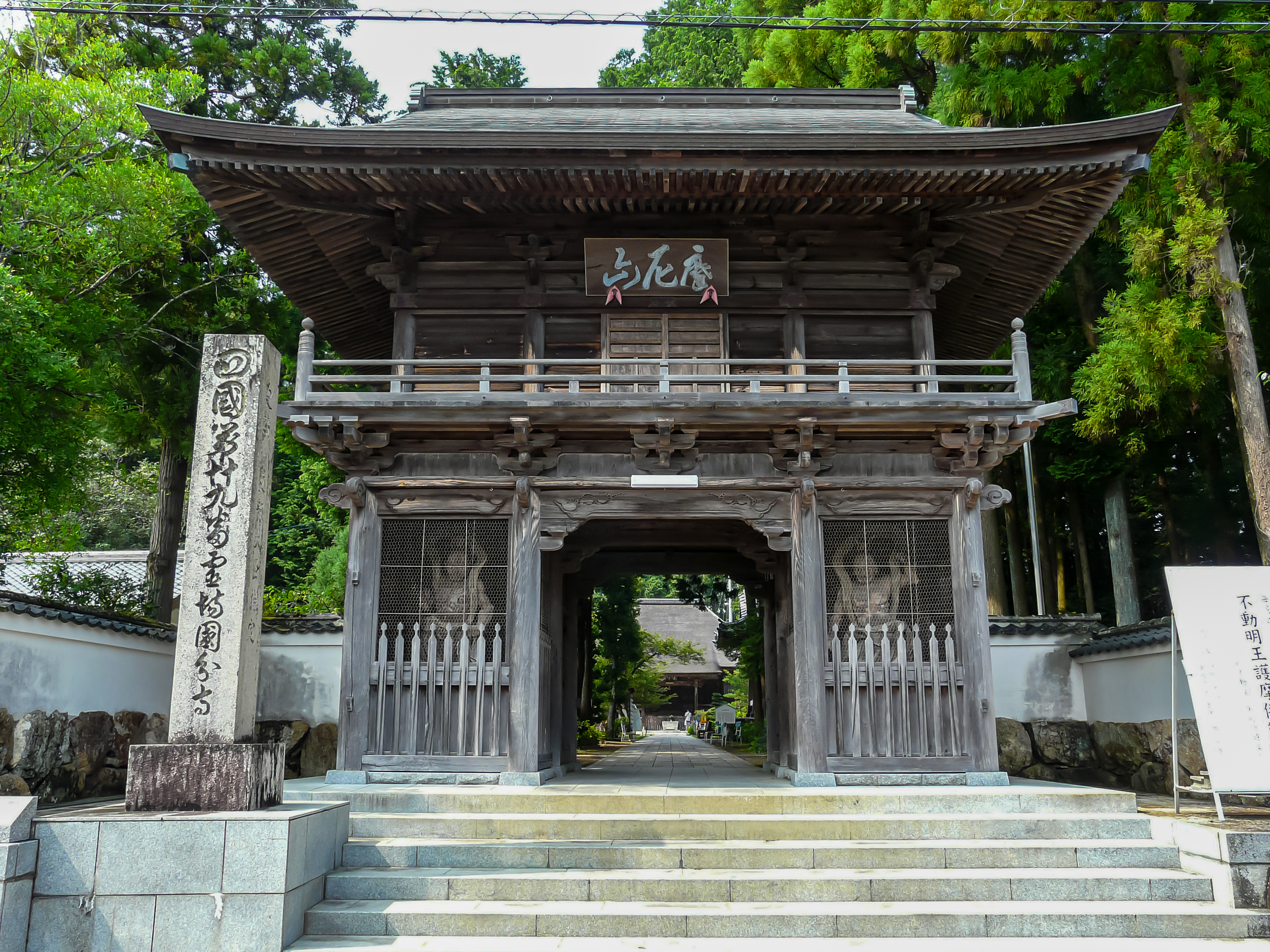
Sanmon

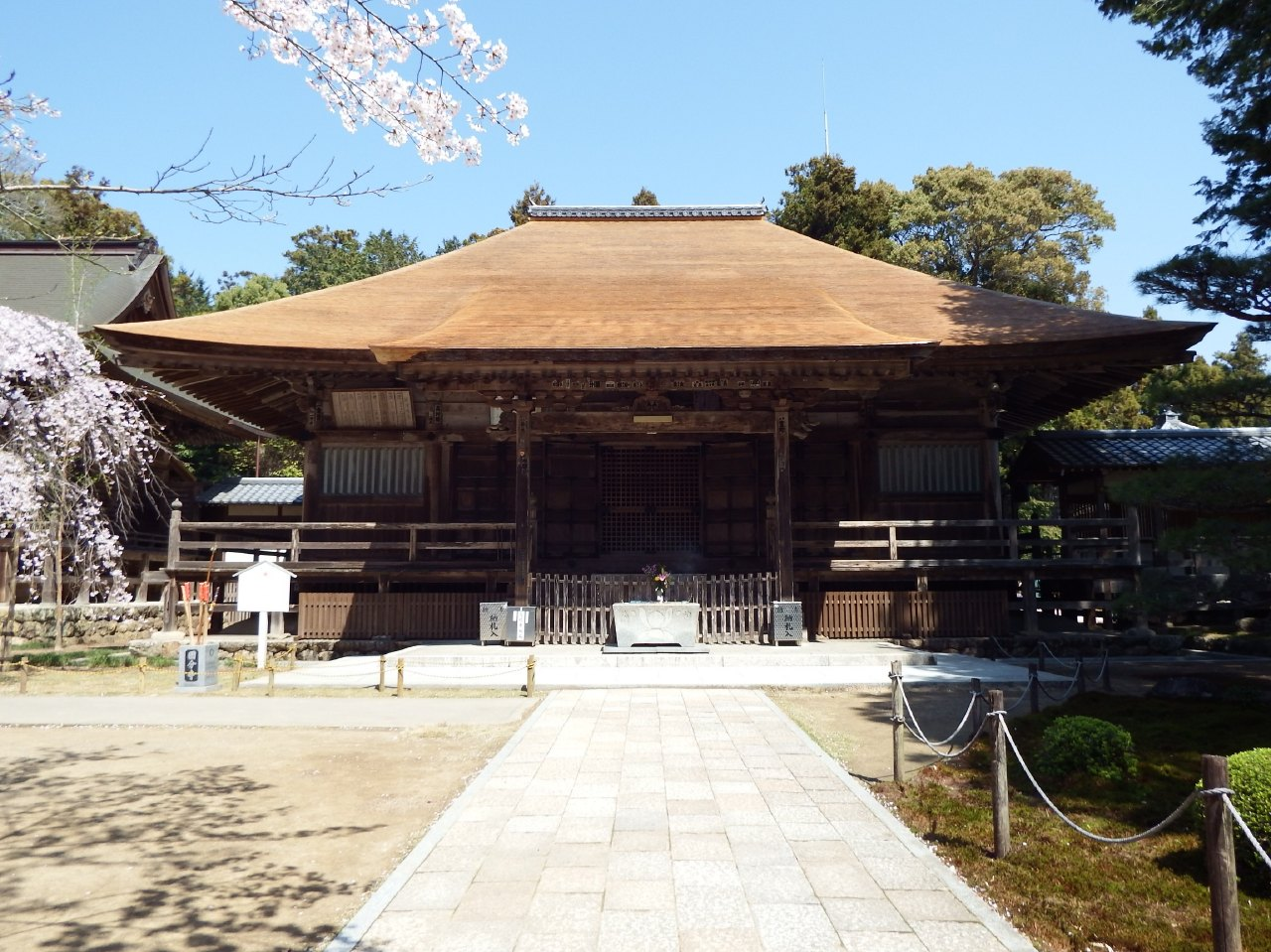
Kondō (ICP)

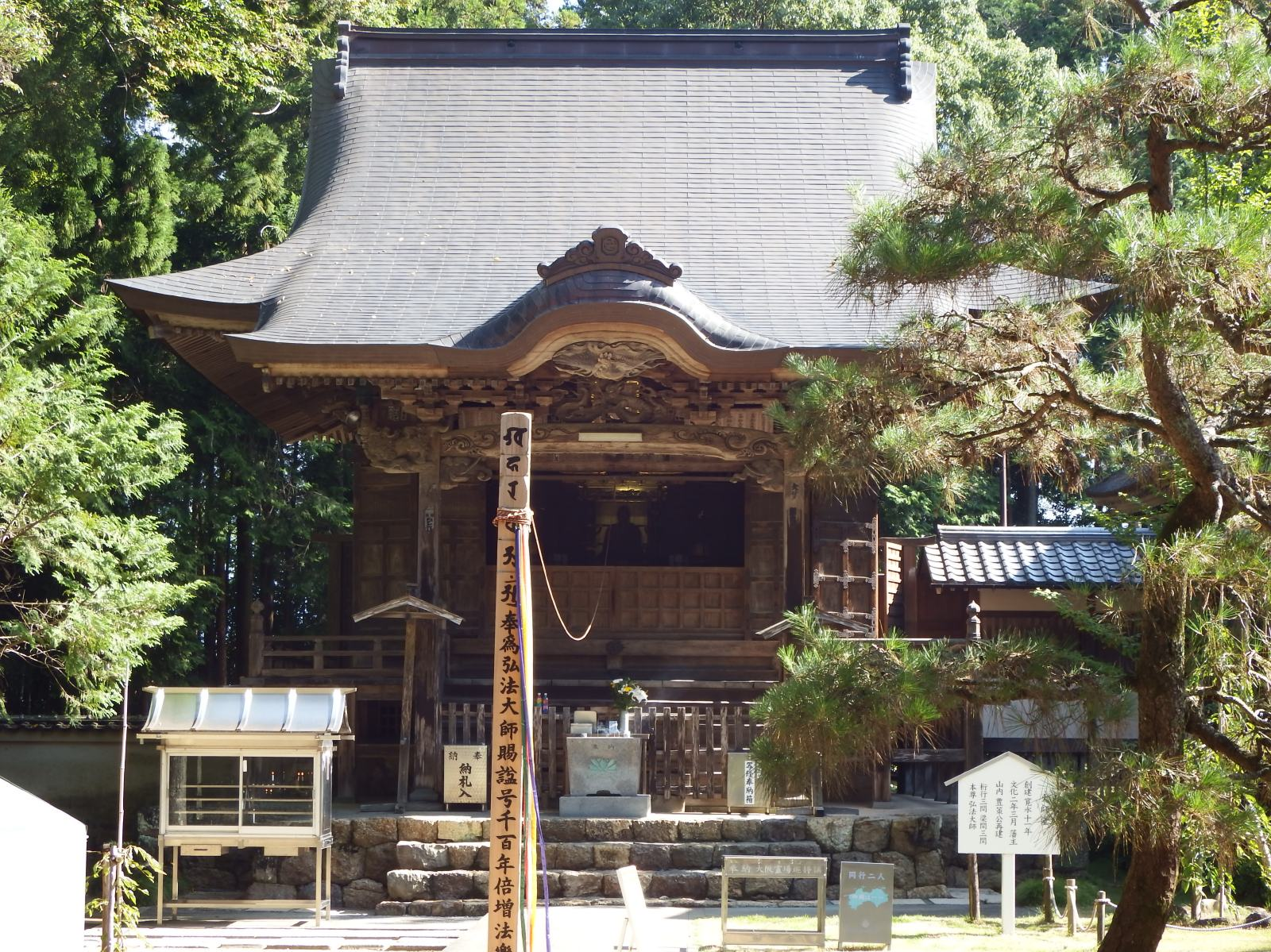
Daishi-dō

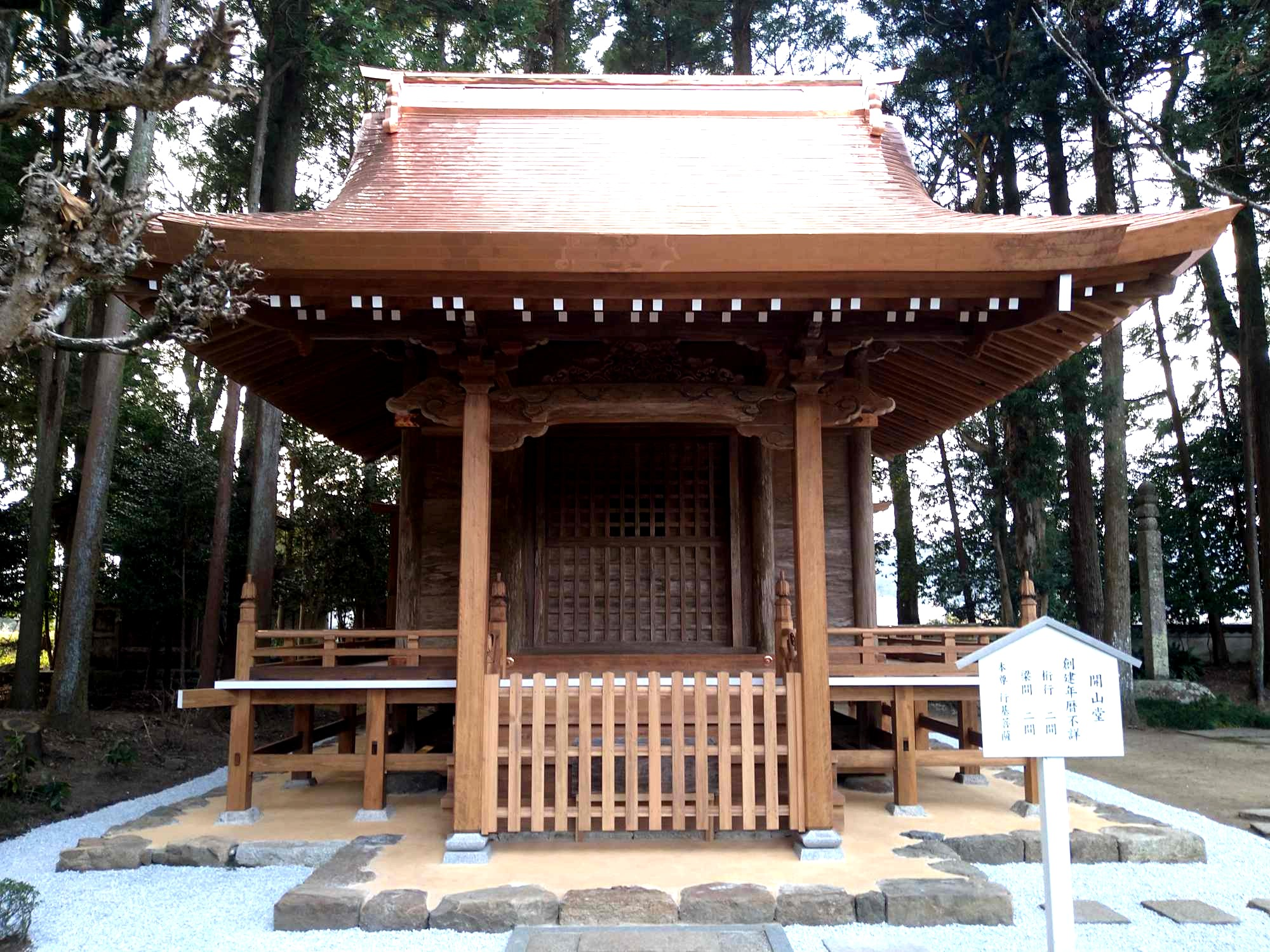
Kaisan-dō

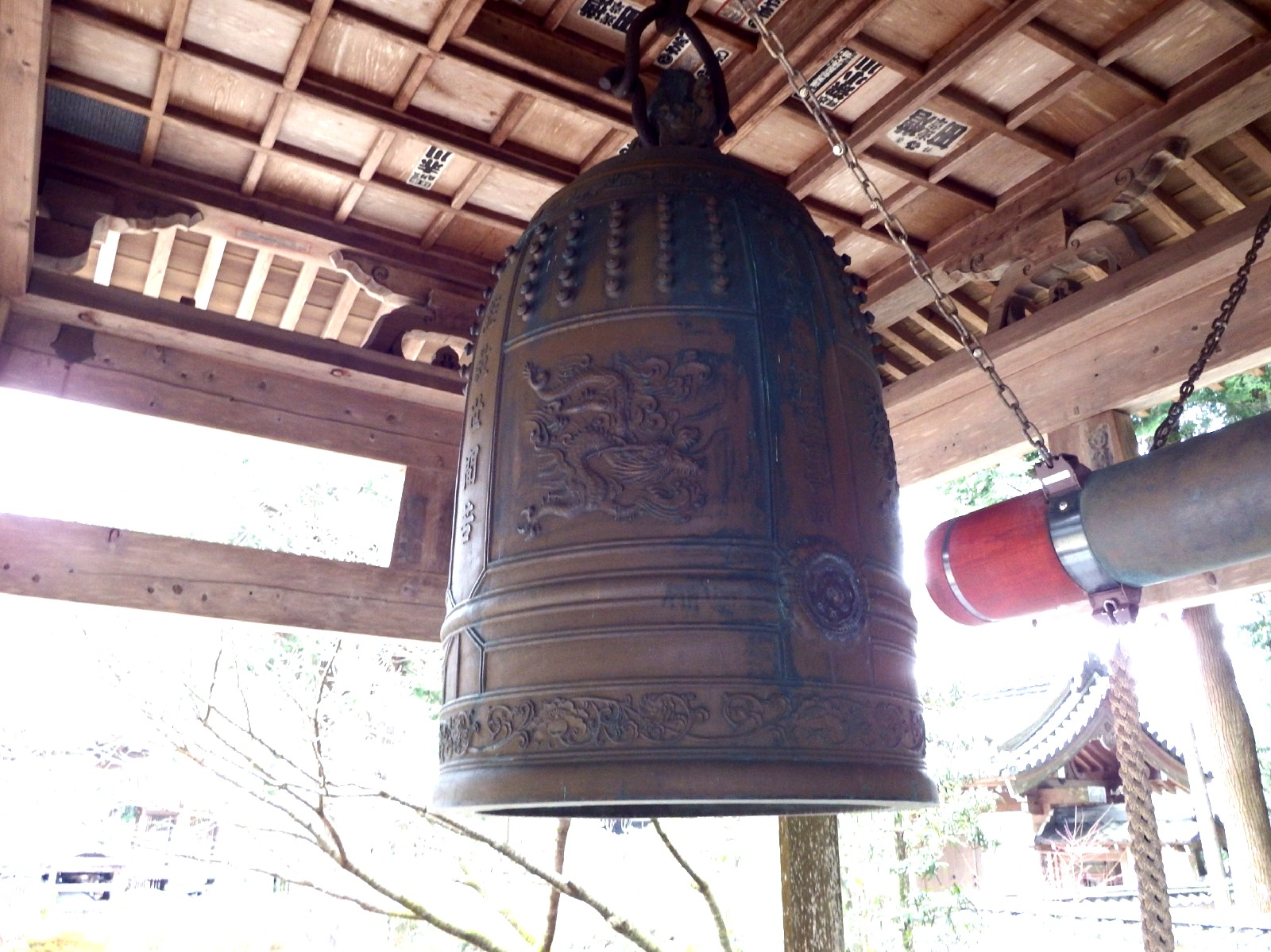
Bonshō (ICP)

== Cultural Properties ==
=== National Important Cultural Properties ===
- Kondō (金堂), late Muromachi period (rebuilt 1558);
- Wooden statue of standing Yakushi Nyorai (木造薬師如来立像), mid Heian period; 99.6-cm carved from single block of hinoki cypress;
- Wooden statue of standing Yakushi Nyorai (木造薬師如来立像), Kamakura period; 35.1-cm, yosegi-zukuri, repaired in 1416;
- Bonshō (梵鐘), early Heian period; Diameter: 47.2 cm, height: 80.6 cm, weight: 225 kg. the oldest temple bell in Kochi Prefecture;

=== Kochi Prefecture Designated Protected Tangible Cultural Properties ===
- Silk painting of Ryōkai Mandala (絹本著色両界曼陀羅), Muromachi period;
- Zushi & Shumidan (本堂の厨子・須弥壇), Muromachi period;

== Tosa Kokubun-niji ==
While the locations of the provincial nunneries associated with the kokubunji in Sanuki, Iyo, and Awa have been identified and designated as either national or prefectural historic sites, Tosa Kokubun-niji has yet to be identified. The most likely site is the Hie temple ruins (a National Historic Site), located approximately two kilometers northeast of Tosa Kokubun-ji. One theory is that the Hie temple ruins was founded during the Hakuho period, and was later converted into a kokubuniji nunnery, and then abandoned around the early 10th century. Only the central stone of the pagoda remains. The foundation stone measures 3.24 meters in height, 2.21 meters in width, and has an 81-cm central hole, suggesting that it was a five-story pagoda over 30 meters in height.

== See also ==
- Provincial temple
- Shikoku 88 temple pilgrimage
- List of Historic Sites of Japan (Kōchi)
