= Hie temple ruins =

Coordinates: 33°36′12.20″N 133°39′2.60″E

- 比江廃寺跡 (Japanese)
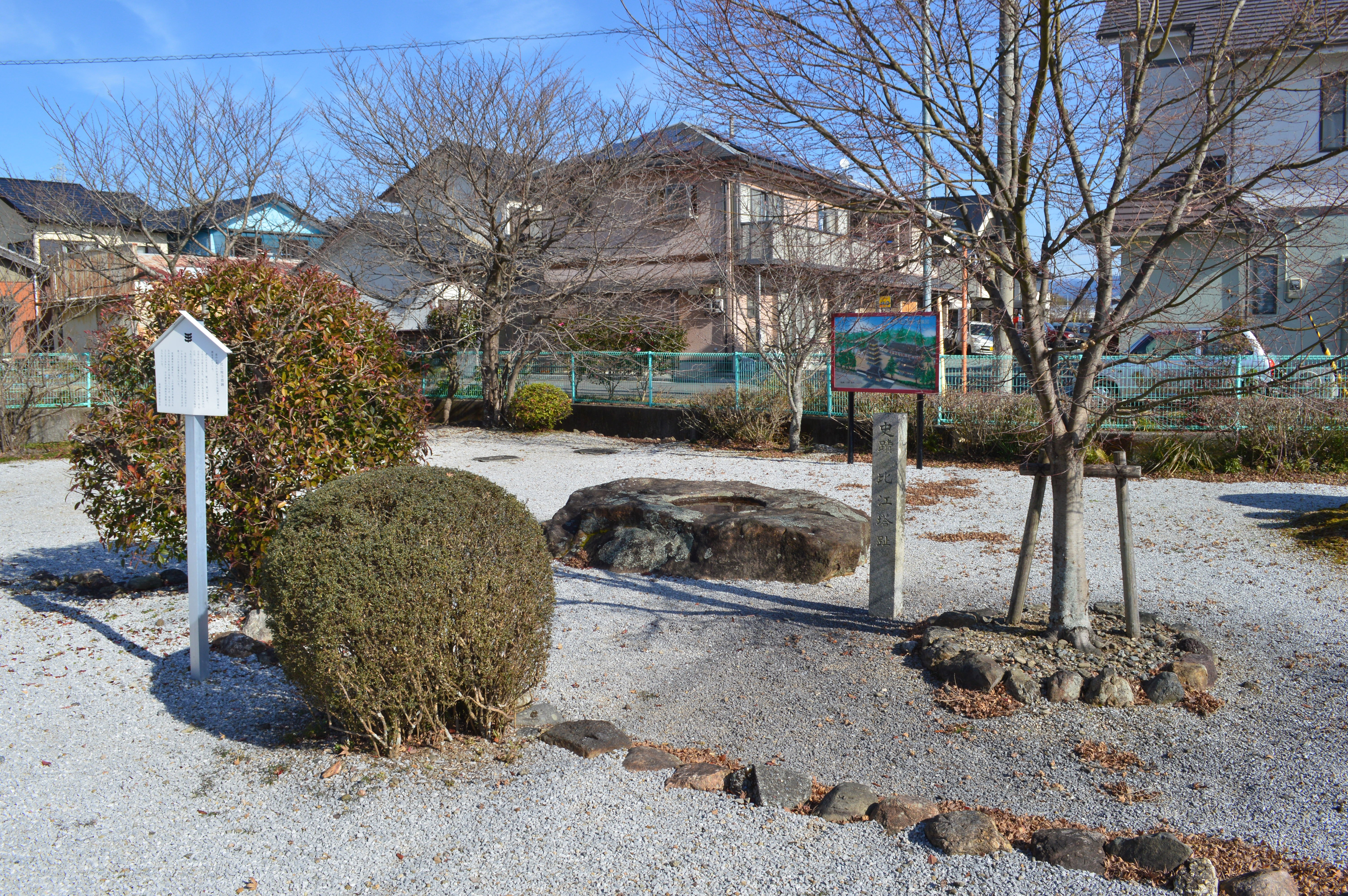
- Hie temple ruins pagoda foundations

- Hie temple ruins Hie temple ruins (Japan)
- Interactive map of Hie temple ruins
- Type: temple ruins
- Periods: Hakuhō period
- Location: Nankoku, Kōchi, Japan
- Region: Shikoku

History
- Built: 6th century AD

Site notes
- Public access: No facilities

Hie temple ruins (比江廃寺跡, Hie haiji ato) is an archaeological site with the ruins of a Hakuhō period Buddhist temple located in the Hie neighborhood of what is now the city of Nankoku, Kōchi, Japan. The foundations of its pagoda were designated as a National Historic Site in 1934, with the area under protection extended in 1982.

== History ==
The Hie temple ruins are located on a natural embankment on the northern bank of the Kokubu River in central Kochi Prefecture, north of the central Kochi Plain. Per archaeological excavations conducted in 1969, 1990, and 1994–1995, it was found to have been a clan temple for a local ruling clan in the 7th century during the Hakuhō period. The period of construction of the temple coincided with the expansion of the nearby Tosa provincial capital, although the temple does not appear in any records and its name are history are unknown. The temple was refurbished around the middle of the 8th century, during which time a pagoda was added to its layout. This has led to speculation that it may be been converted into either a Kokufu-ji temple (official temple associated with the provincial capital) or converted to the Tosa Kokubun-niji, or provincial nunnery, who construction was mandated by Emperor Shōmu, but whose whereabouts are still unknown. Either theory is supported by the fact that roof tiles recovered from the site are the same as have been found at the Tosa Kokubun-ji. The former theory is further supported by the sites location to the "unlucky" northeast direction from the provincial capital complex, and the latter theory is weakened by the fact that most provincial nunneries did not have a pagoda; however, neither theory can conclusively be proved. The temple was abandoned around the middle of the 10th century.

The area and layout of the temple remain clear. A north-south ditch has been detected on the east side of the presumed temple precinct, but the west, south, and north sides have not yet been found. The foundation stones for only the pagoda and two other structures have been found. The pagoda foundations are relatively intact and are in situ. They indicate a structure 11.4 meters on each side, indicating a five-story pagoda with a height of around 32 meters. The base stones made of sandstone and measures 3.24 meters long, 2.21 meters wide and 1.80 meters high, with post hole with a diameter of 0.81 meters drilled in the center to hold the main spar of the pagoda. A reliquary hole with a diameter of 0.20 meters and a depth of 0.12 meters was drilled slightly north of the center. In the 1994-1995 survey, two buildings were confirmed on the north side of the tower. One building believed to have been an eight by five bay structure, with spans of 3.00 meters between the pillars. Another building was located northwest of the pagoda. This building was a slightly smaller five by four bay structure. A large amount of roof tiles have been excavated from the temple grounds, and include the same pattern as found at Hōryū-ji in Ikaruga, Nara. The tile supply kiln may have been one of the Sue Old Kiln Sites located in the Tosa-Yamada neighborhood of Kami, Kōchi, and transported using the Kokubu River. Fragments of cylindrical haniwa have been found among the excavated shards. No burial mounds have been confirmed in the vicinity, and the shape and arrangement of the cylindrical haniwa are the same as those excavated from the Fushihara-Otsuka Kofun in Tosa-Yamada-cho, Kami.

Artifacts excavated from the site are kept at the Kōchi Prefectural Museum of History, also in Nankoku.

== Gallery ==
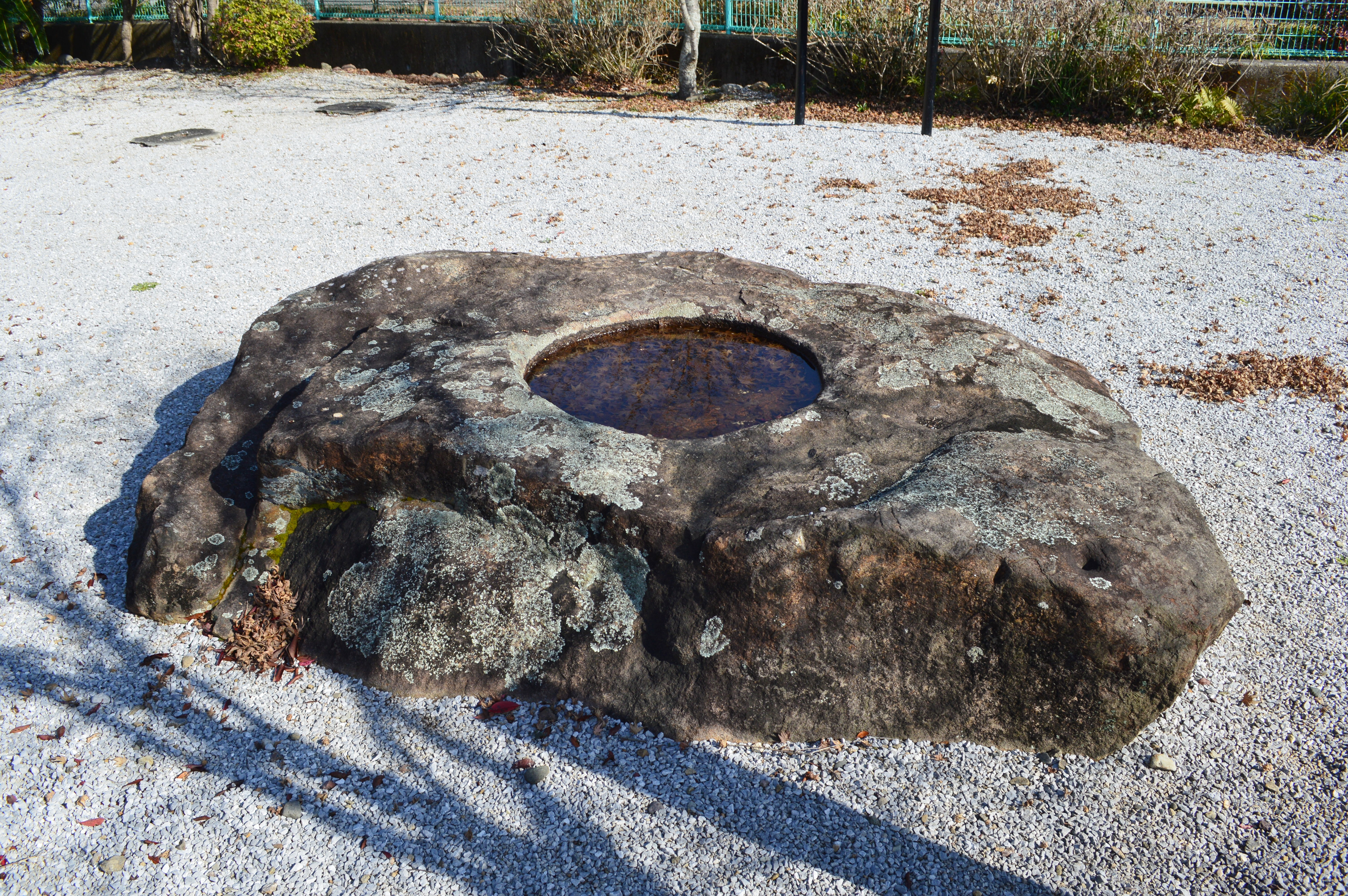
Pagoda foundation stone

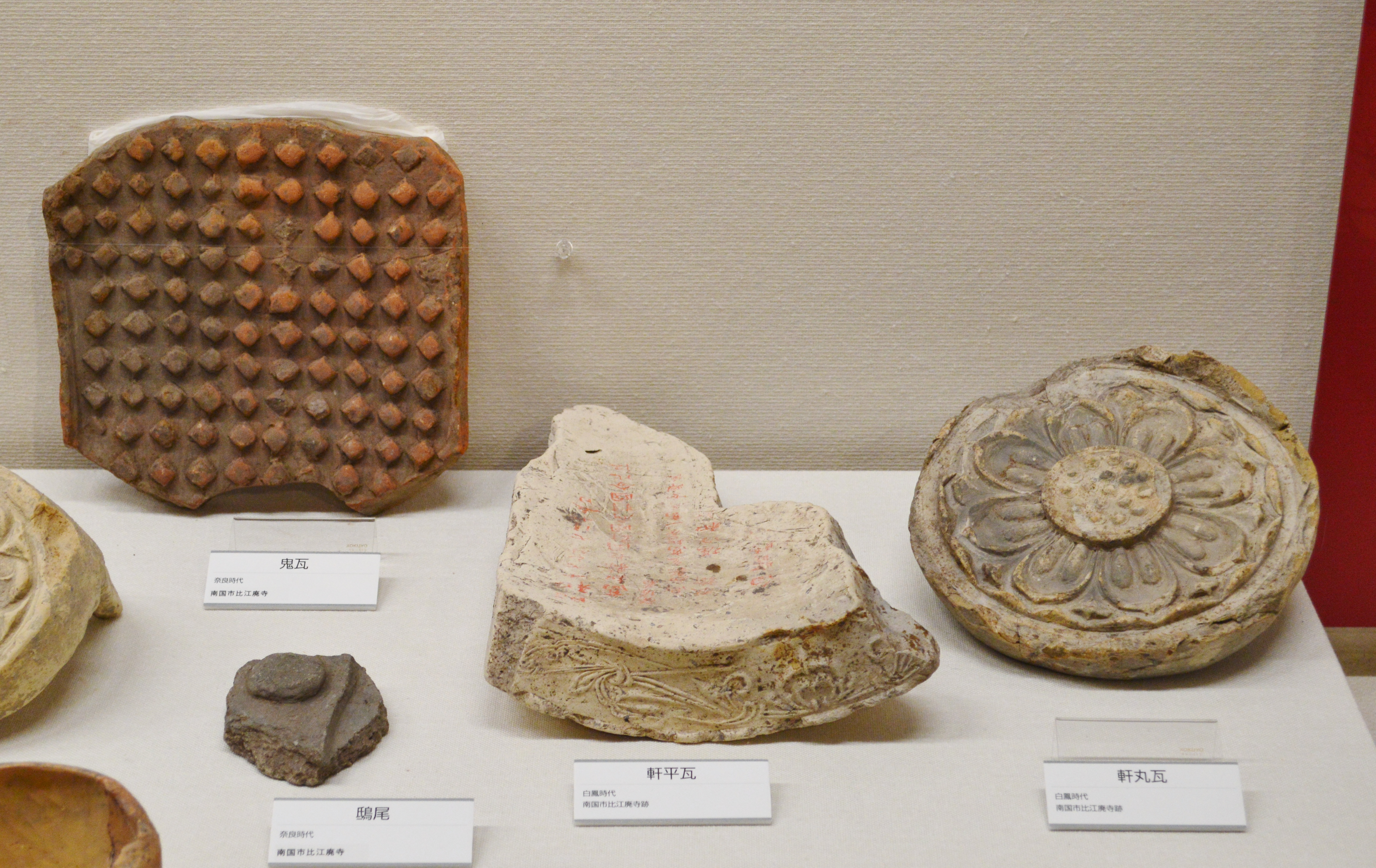
Excavated roof tiles

== See also ==
- List of Historic Sites of Japan (Kōchi)
