= Asakura Kofun =

Kofun period burial mound in Kōchi, Japan

- 朝倉古墳 (Japanese)
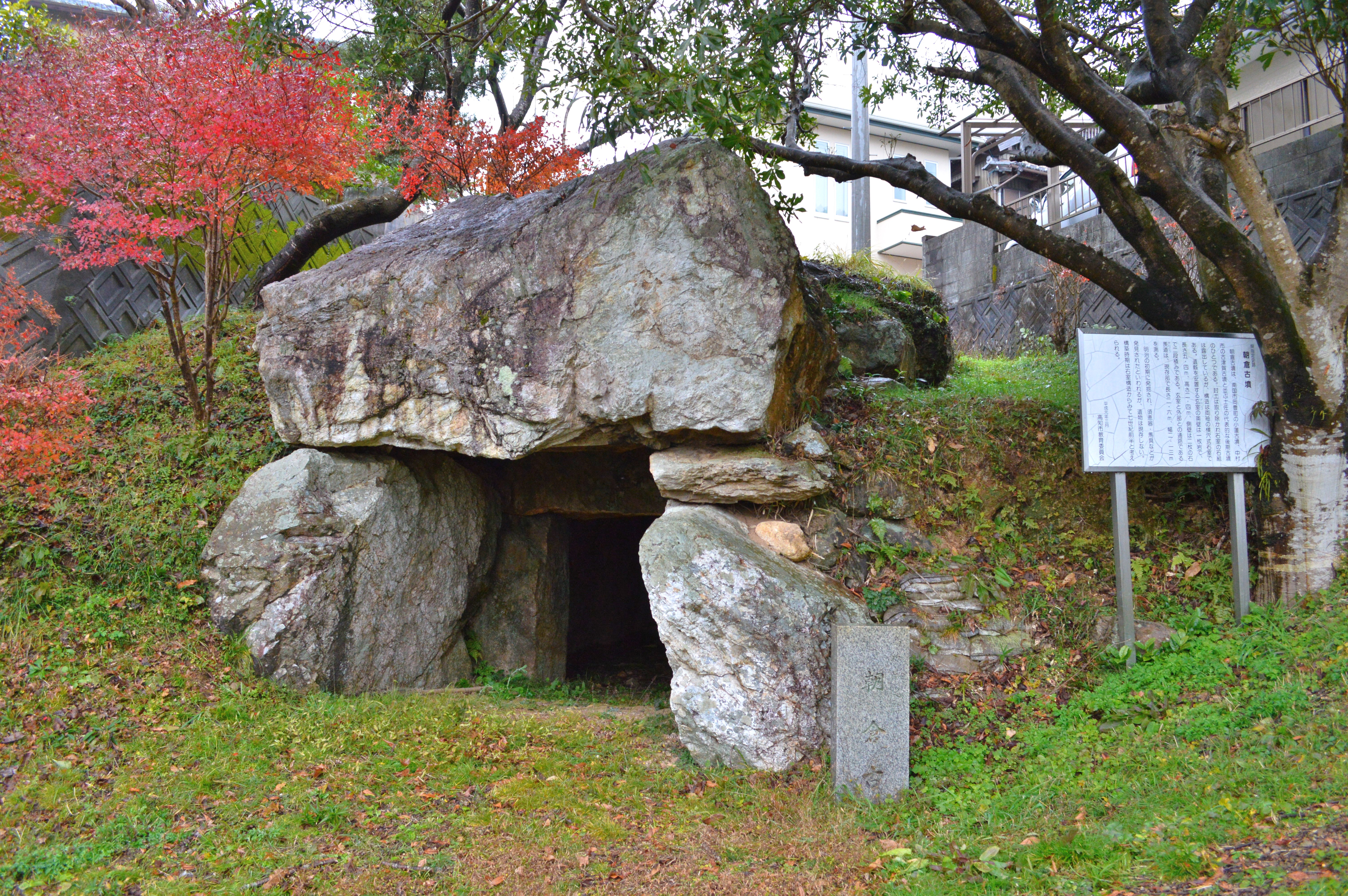
- Asakura Kofun

- Asakura Kofun Asakura Kofun (Japan)
- 33°33′11.50″N 133°28′40.07″E
- Type: Kofun
- Periods: Kofun period
- Location: Asakura, Kōchi, Kōchi, Japan
- Region: Shikoku

History
- Built: early 7th century

Site notes
- Public access: Yes (no facilities)
- Kōchi Prefecture Historic Site

Asakura Kofun (朝倉古墳) is a Kofun period burial mound, located in the Asakura neighborhood of the city of Kōchi in the island of Shikoku, Japan. The tumulus was designated a Kōchi Prefecture Historic Site in 1950.

== Overview ==
The Asakura Kofun is located on the southern slope of Akagiyama (also a Kochi Prefecture Historic Site), the sacred mountain of Asakura Shrine, in the western part of the Kōchi Plain. Due to land reclamation in the early twentieth century, the earthen mound was lost, leaving the stone burial chamber exposed to the elements. Because of its appearance, it is also called the "Ishibutai Kofun of Kōchi." Several archaeological excavations have been conducted. Since the mound has been destroyed, the original shape and size of the kofun are unknown. The burial facility is a double-chambered horizontal-entry stone burial chamber measuring just over 5.4 by 2.6 meters, with a 3.9 meter x 1.1 meter entry passage. Due to repeated looting, few grave goods have been unearthed. Historical records indicate horse trappings, iron arrowheads, and Sue ware pottery were excavated from the chamber in the early Meiji period (but the whereabouts of these artifacts is now unknown). Excavations in 2008 and 2009 yielded Sue ware pottery, iron arrowheads, and a knife.

From its location, the kofun has been traditionally associated with the kuni no miyatsuko of Tosa Province, an ancient powerful clan related to the Miwa clan who served nearby Asakura Shrine. However, the burial chamber was constructed using megaliths, and its shape is known as a "corner mound type," which is found in other locations associated with the Seto Inland Sea's transportation routes. Based on its appearance, it is estimated to have been constructed around the first half of the 7th century, towards the end of the Kofun period. The 6th and 7th centuries in Tosa Province are considered an unstable period without a clear ruler, suggesting a possibility that whoever ruled what is now western Kōchi City was connected to the rulers of lands along the Seto Inland Sea.

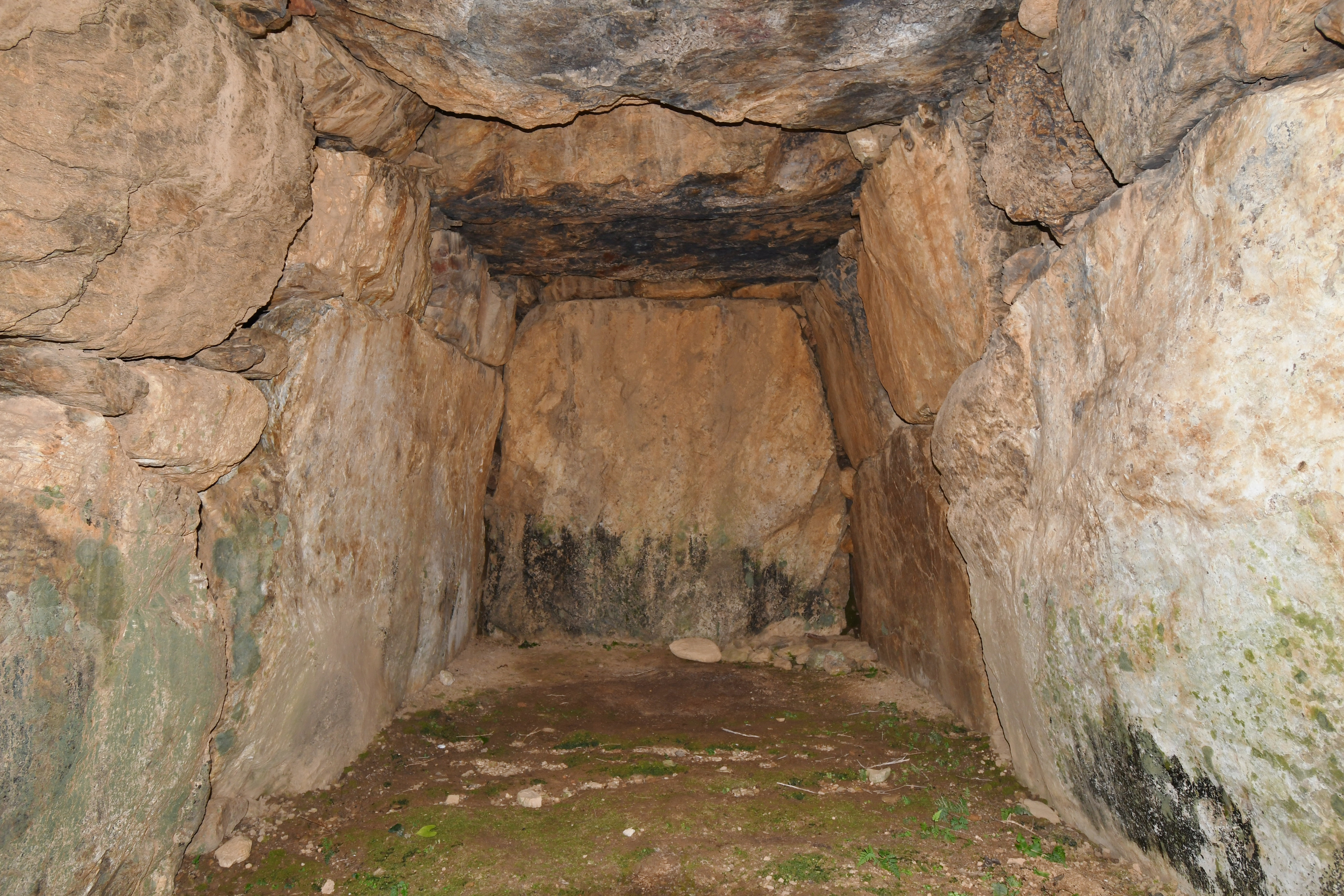
Burial Chamber (towards the back wall)

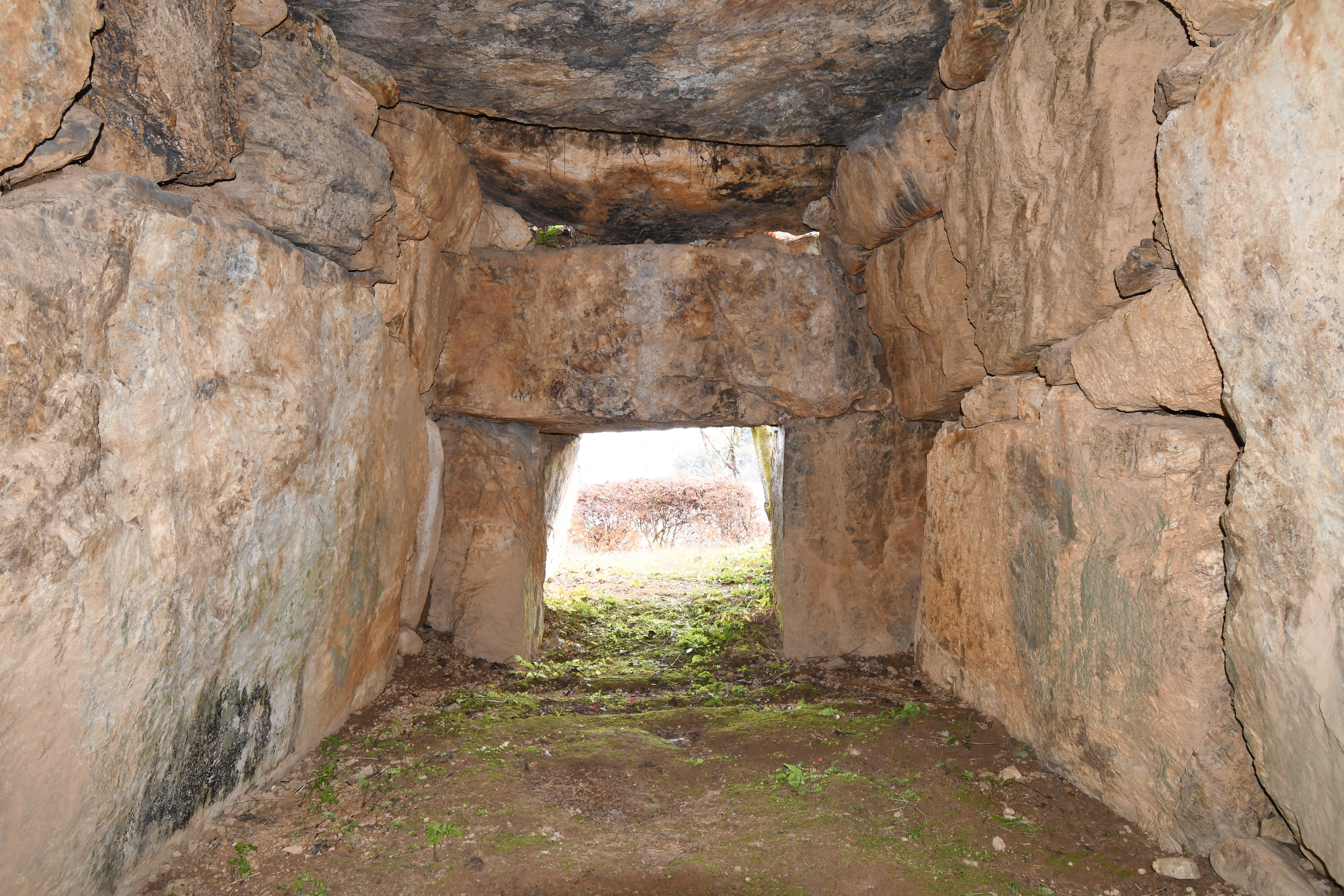
Burial Chamber (towards entry)

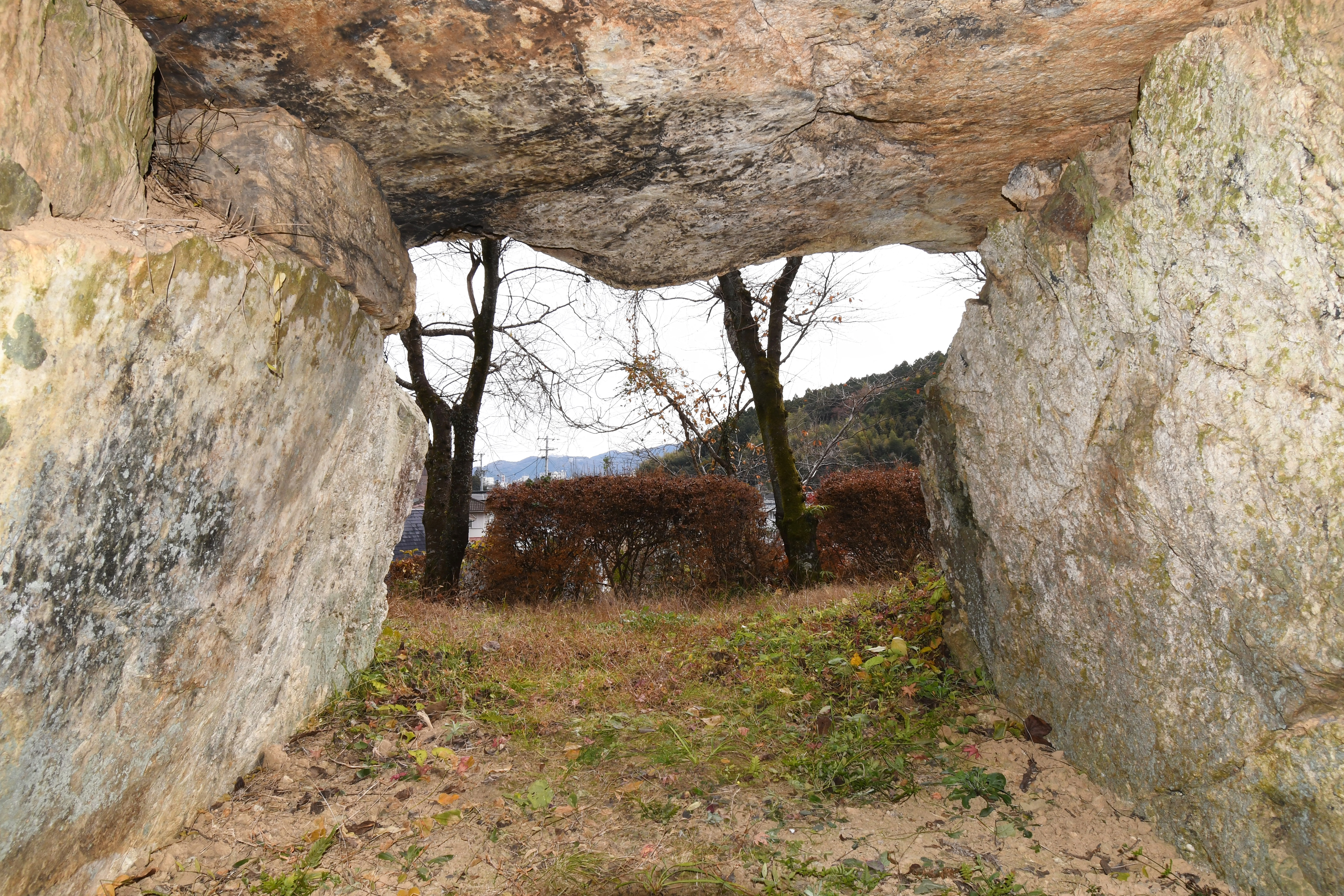
Entrance Passage (towards entry)

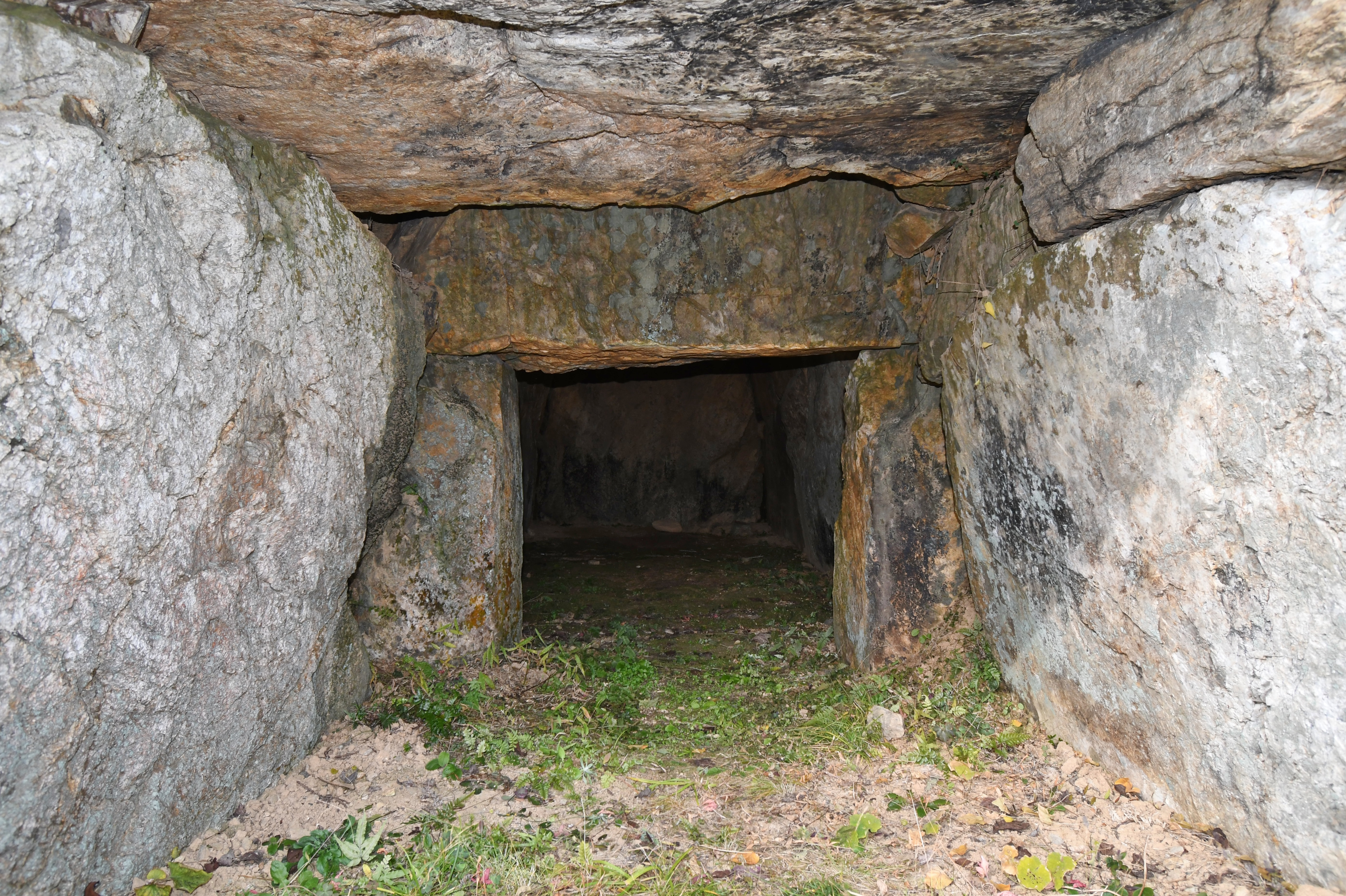
Entrance Passage (towards the burial chamber)

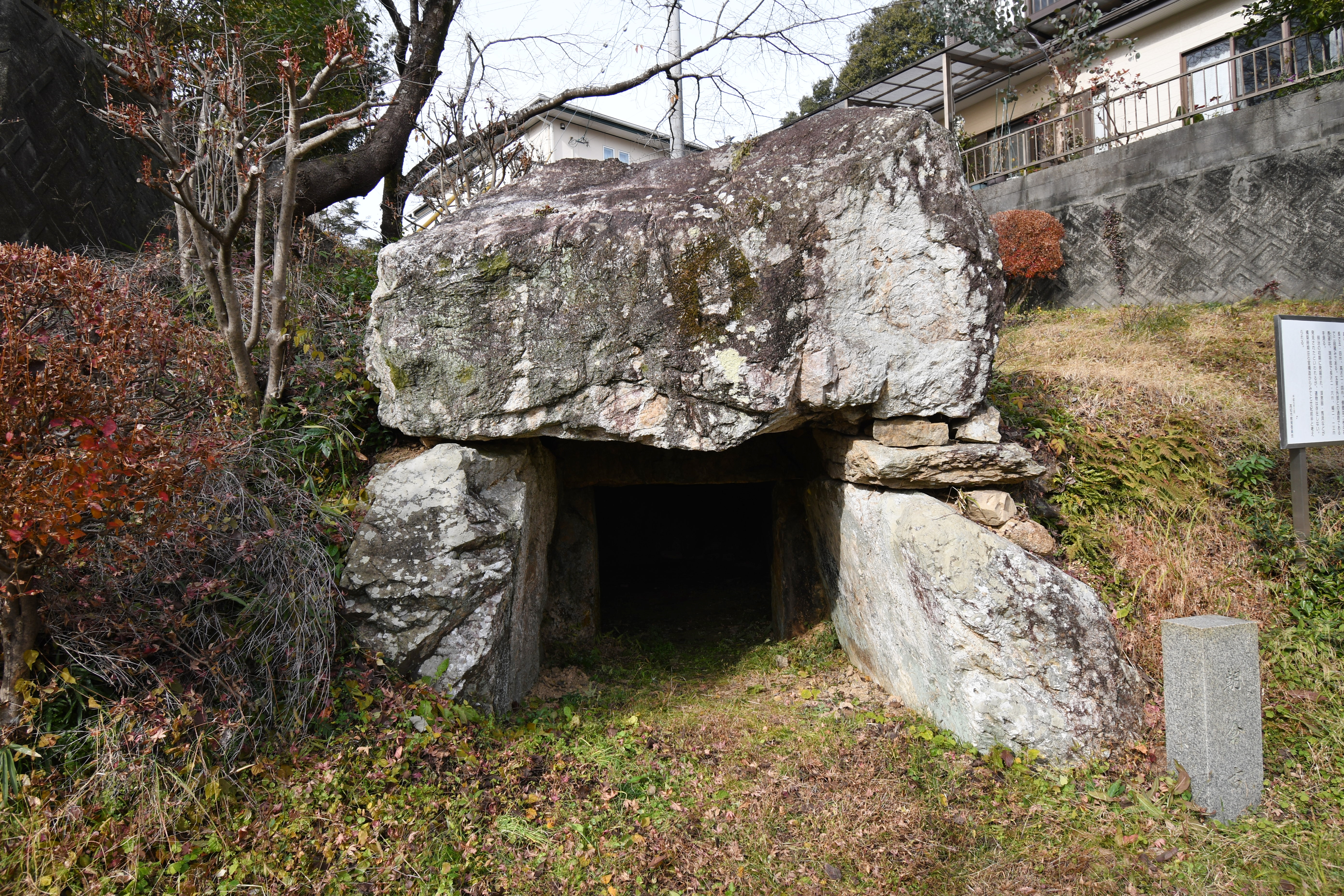
Entry

== See also ==
- List of Historic Sites of Japan (Kōchi)
