= Kohasu Kofun =

Kofun period burial mound in Kōchi, Japan

- 小蓮古墳 (Japanese)
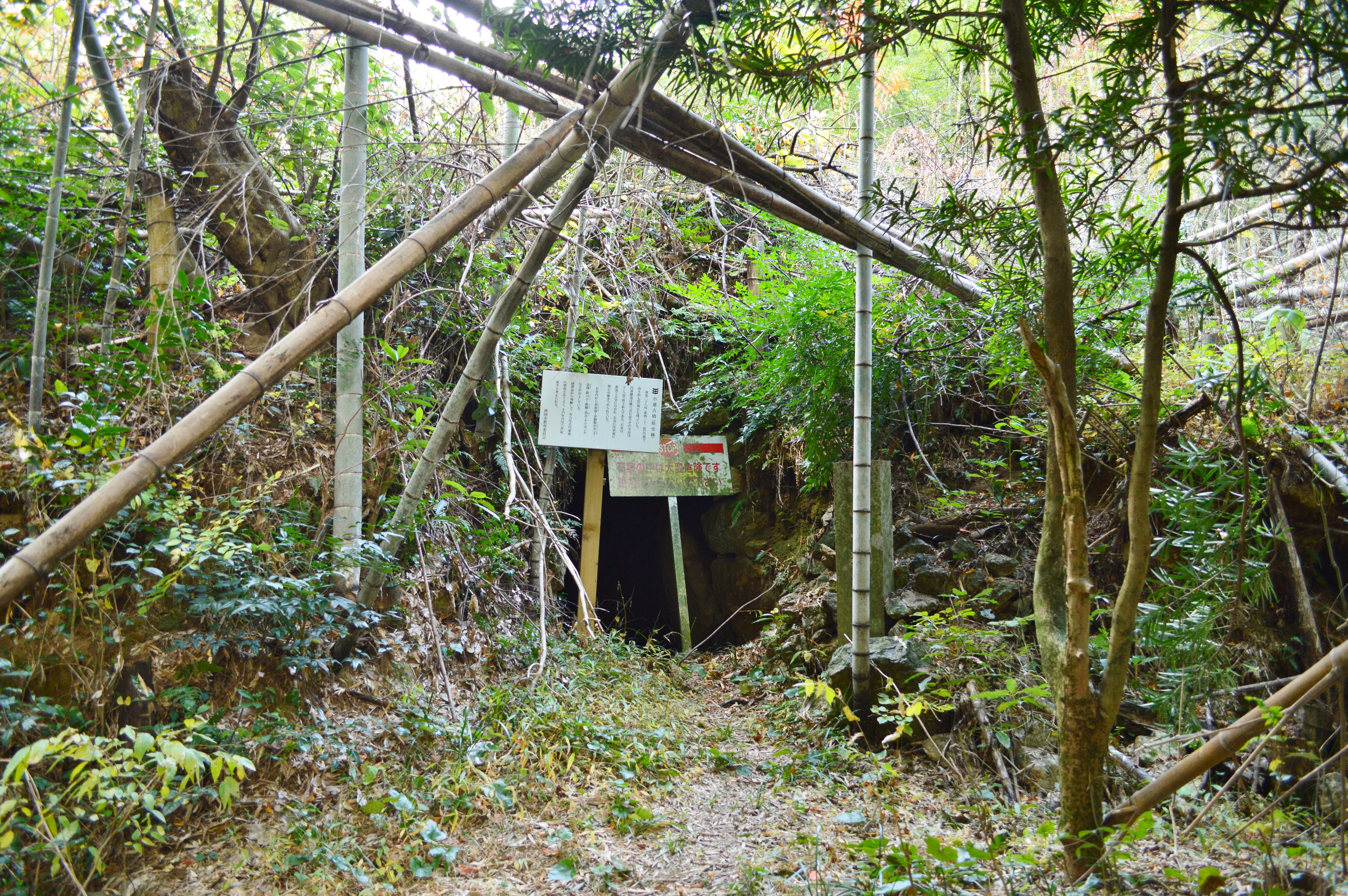
- Kohasu Kofun

- Kohasu Kofun Kohasu Kofun (Japan)
- 33°35′8.93″N 133°37′8.93″E
- Type: Kofun
- Periods: Kofun period
- Location: Okocho Kohasu, Nankoku, Kōchi, Japan
- Region: Shikoku

History
- Built: late 6th century

Site notes
- Public access: Yes (no facilities)
- Kōchi Prefecture Historic Site

Kohasu Kofun (小蓮古墳) is a Kofun period burial mound, located in the Okocho Kohasu neighborhood of the city of Nankoku in the island of Shikoku, Japan. The tumulus was designated a Kōchi Prefecture Historic Site in 1953.

== Overview ==
The Kohasu Kofun is located on the southern slope (approximately 20 meters above sea level) of the Hieyama Fault Line in western Nankoku City. Archaeological excavations were conducted in 1972, and a three-dimensional digital measurement of the stone burial chamber was performed in 2004.

The current shape of the tumulus is oval. measuring 28 meters north-south and 22 meters east-west, and 7.13 meters high; however, the original shape of the kofun is uncertain, as part of it was leveled in later periods. The burial chamber is a double-chambered horizontal-entry stone burial chamber orientated to the southwest . It is believed to have been open since at least the Meiji era. The total length of the burial chamber, including the main chamber and passage, is 10.75 meters, making it the largest in Kōchi Prefecture. It has a width of 1.95 meters (near the back wall) and 2.18 meters (near the entrance), height 2.85 meters (near the back wall), and is connected by a 3.25 meter passage.The floor of the burial chamber is covered with split stones. Excavations have yielded grave goods including gilded bronze hollow beads, gold rings, iron knives, iron arrowheads, chisels, horse fittings, and Sue ware pottery (such as bowls, lids, straight-mouthed lids, and straight-mouthed jars).

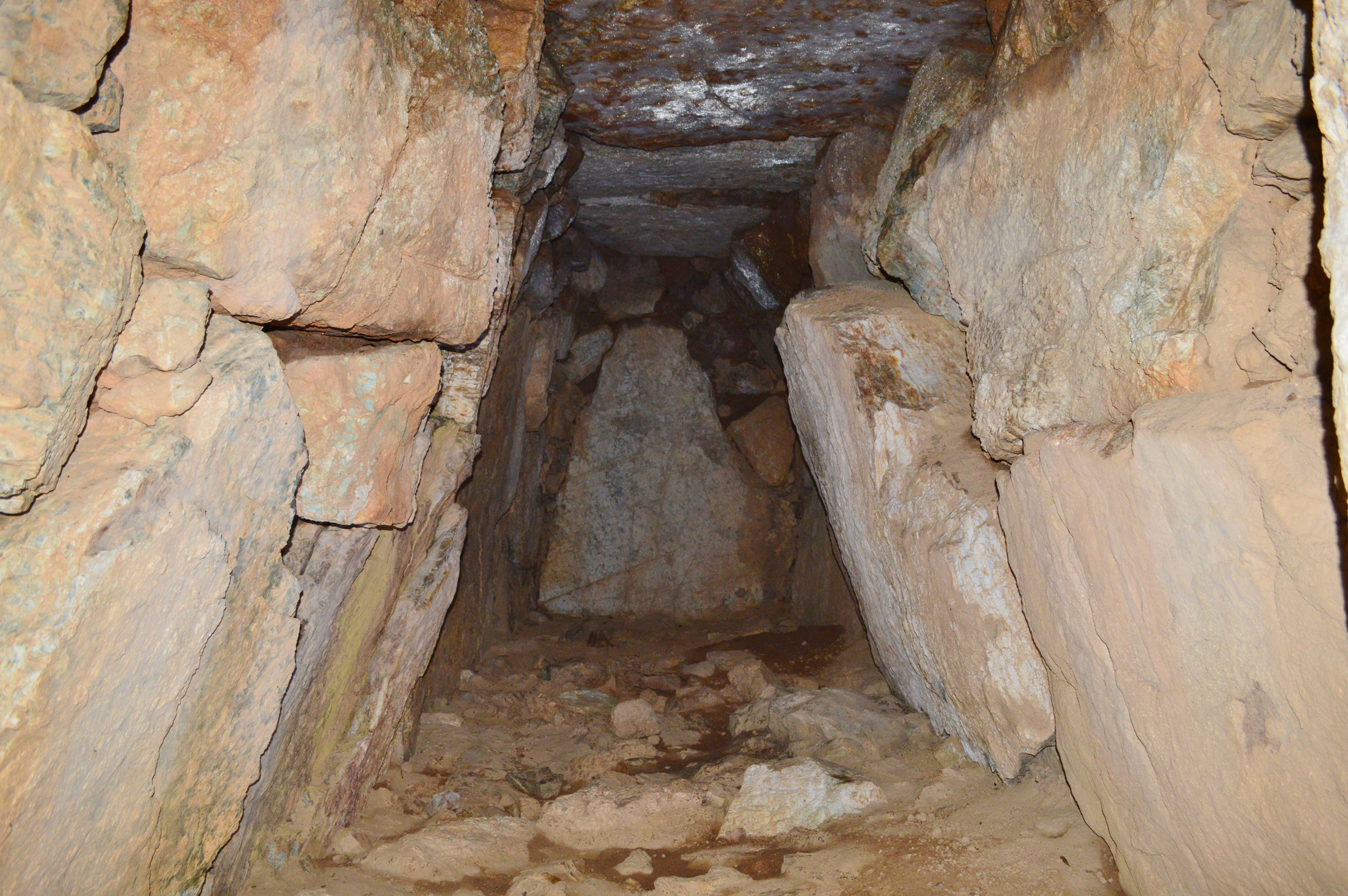
Burial Chamber (towards the back wall)

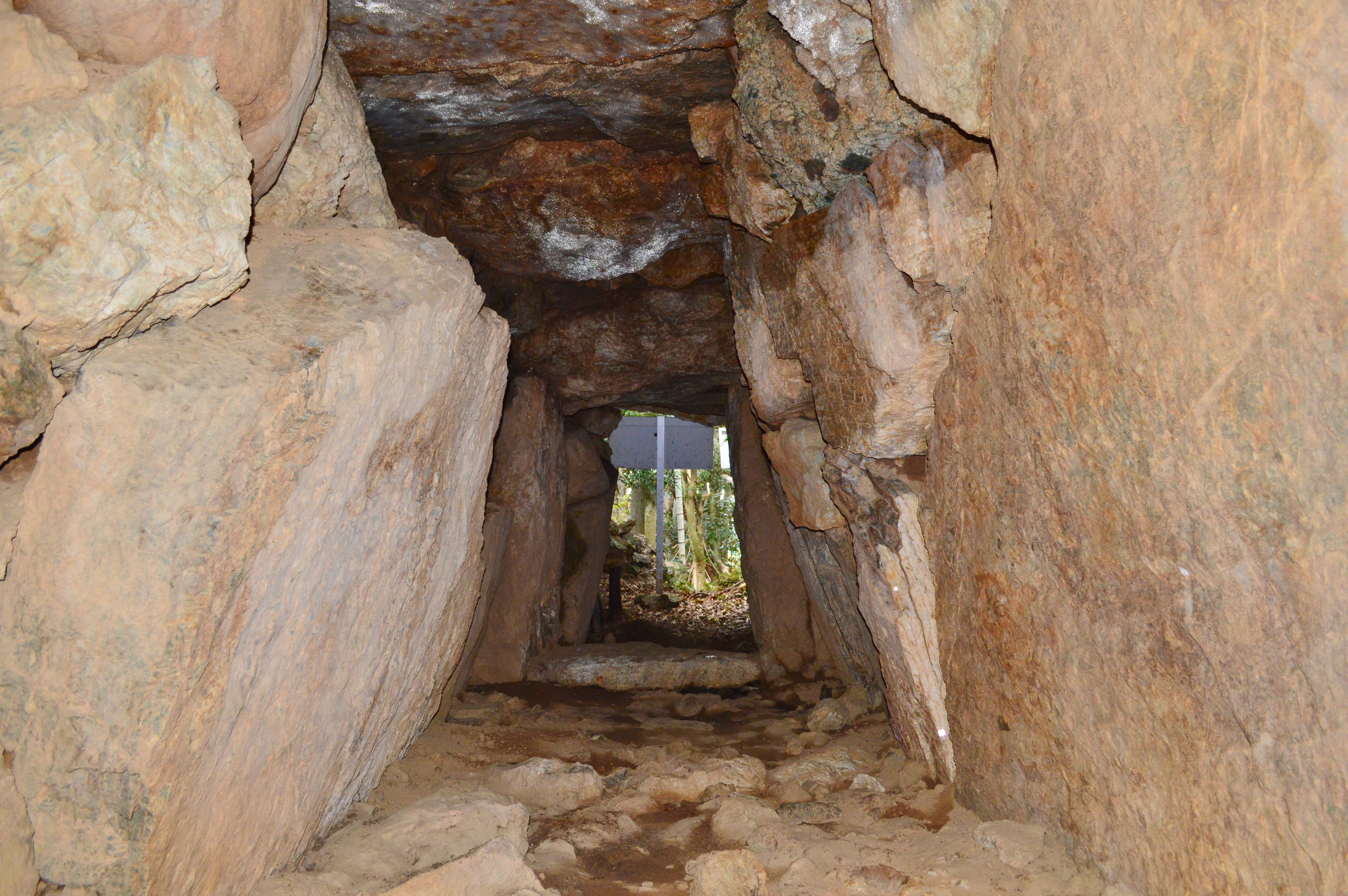
Burial Chamber (towards entry)

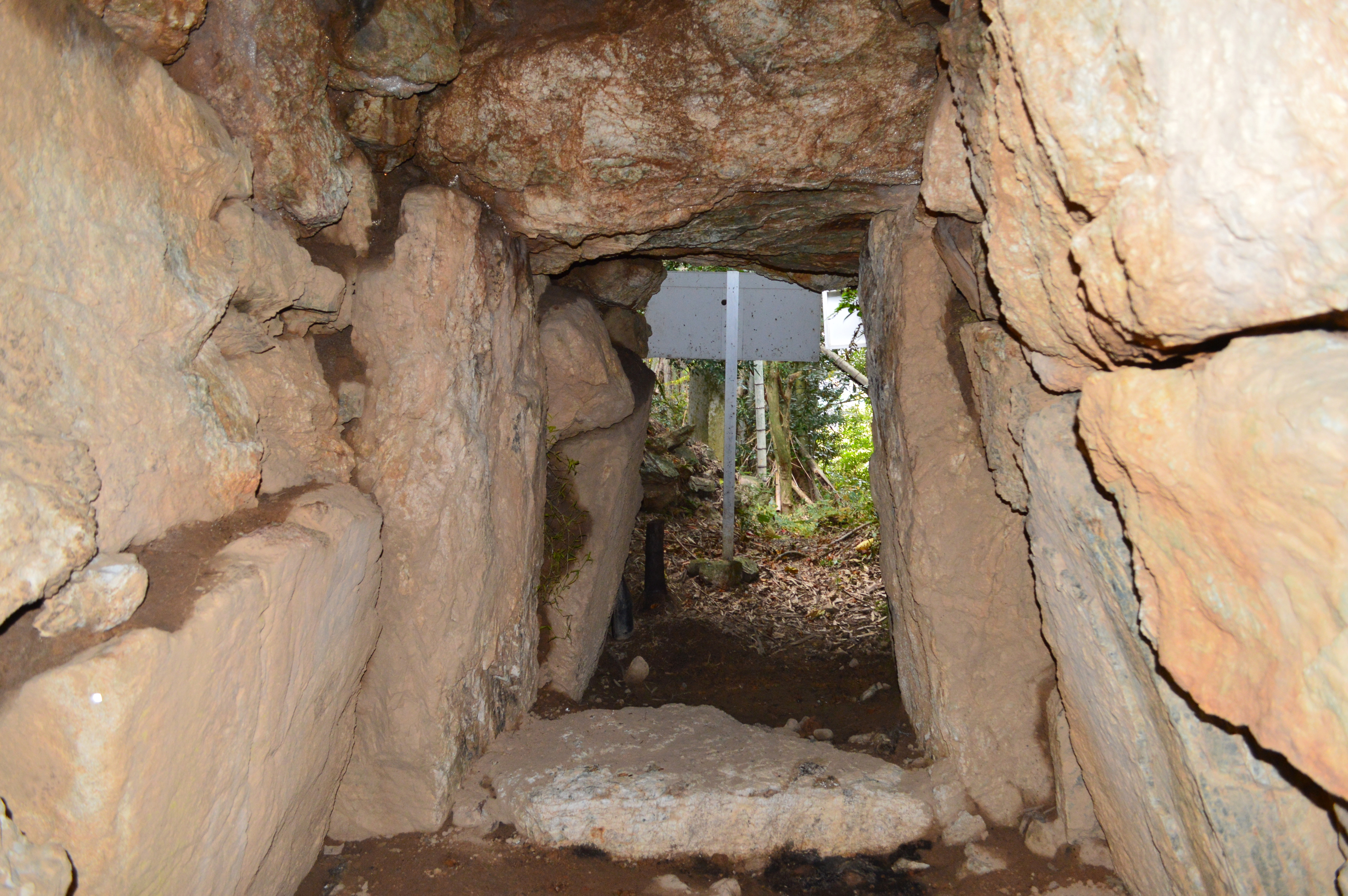
Entry

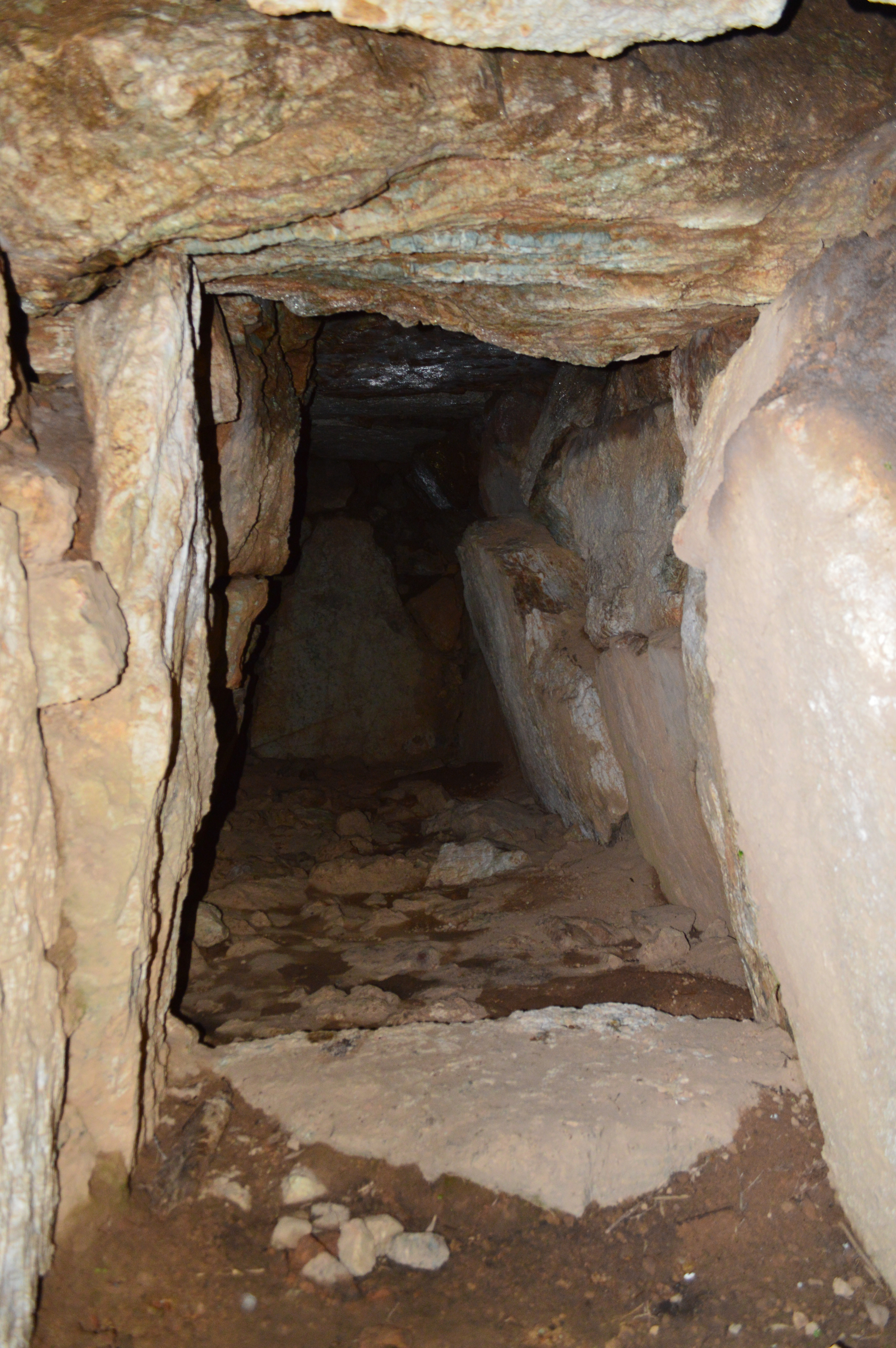
Entrance Passage (towards burial chamber)

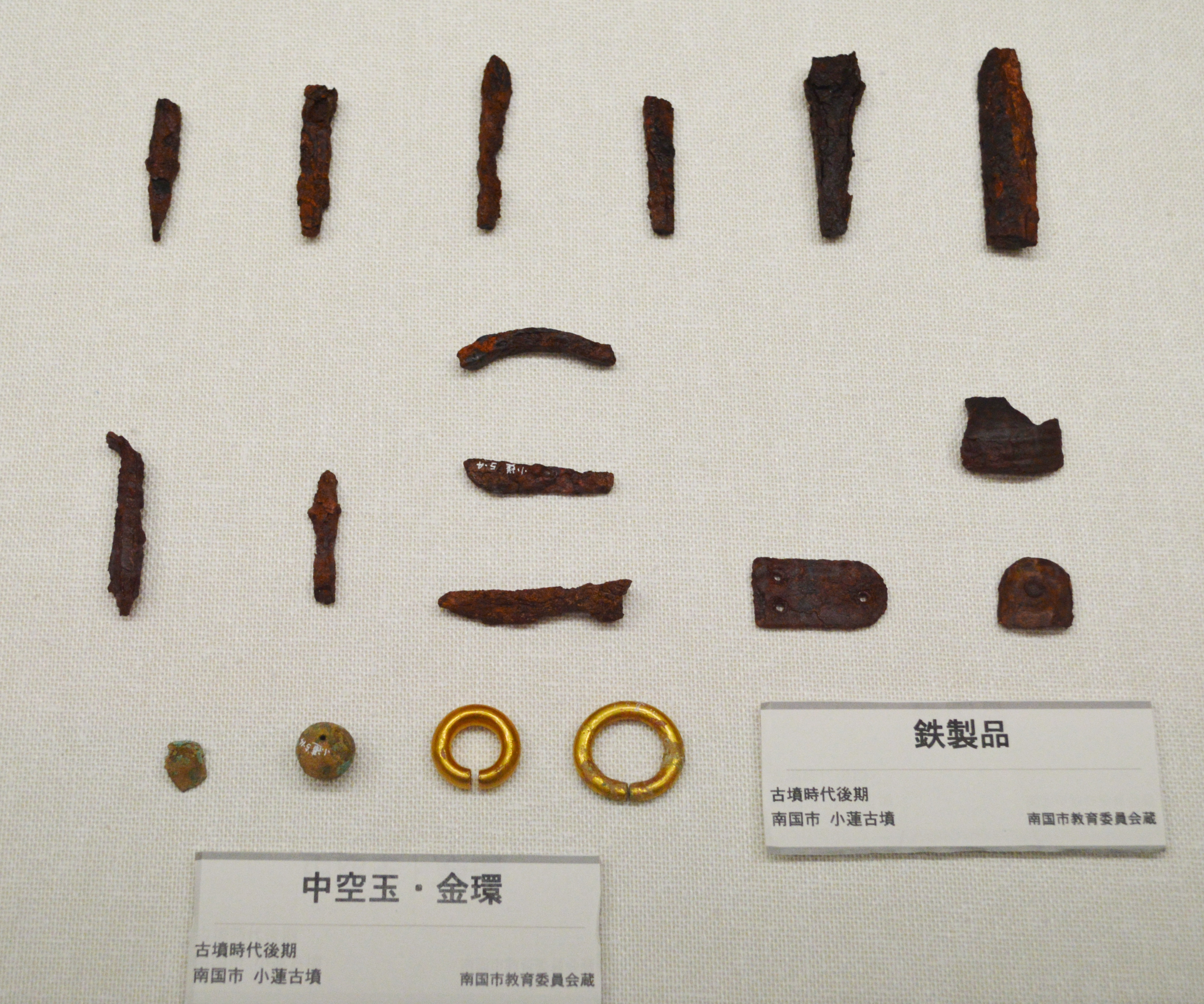
Excavated Artifacts
On display at Kochi Prefectural Museum of History and Folklore

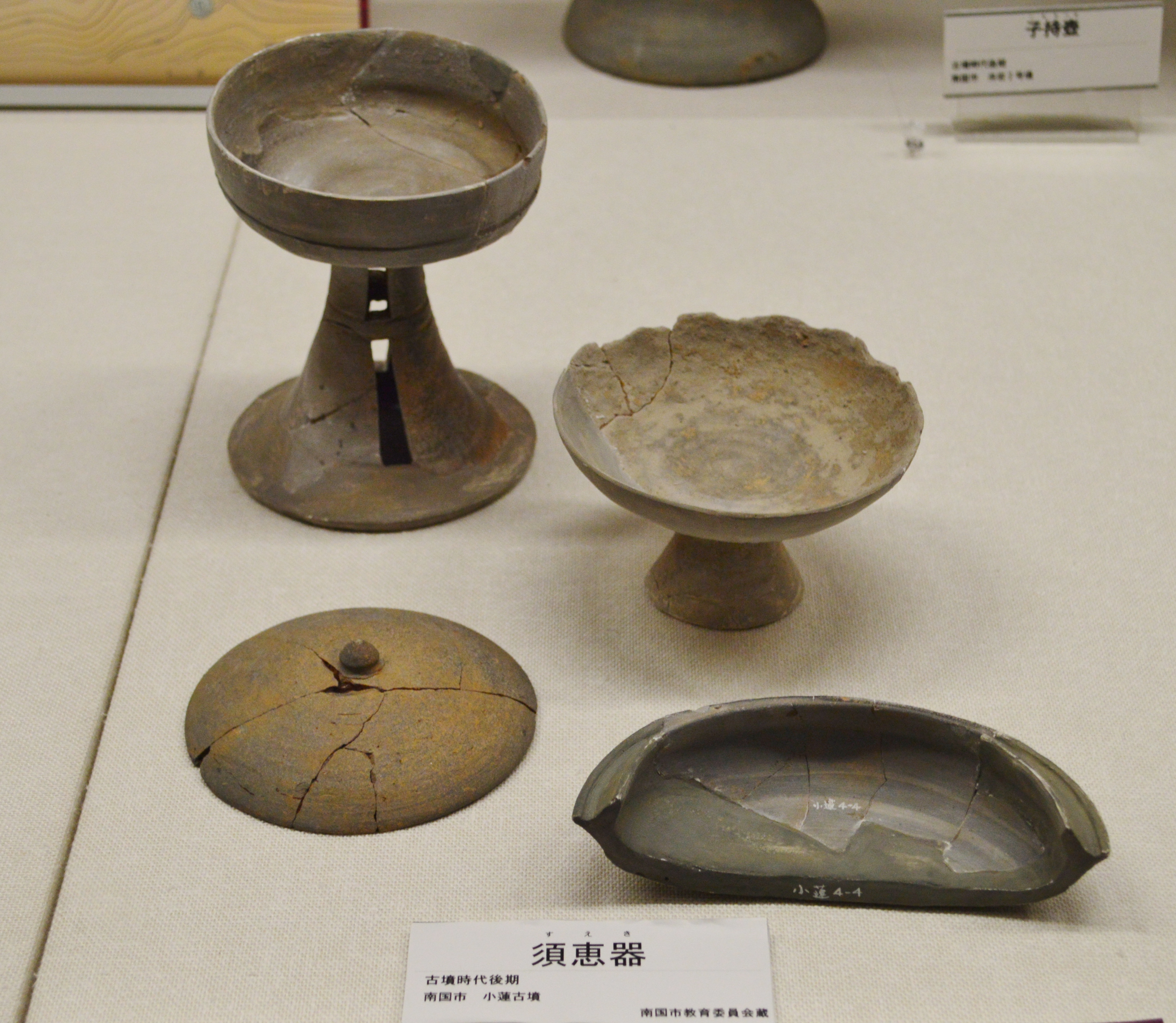
Excavated Sue Ware
On display at Kochi Prefectural Museum of History and Folklore.

== See also ==
- List of Historic Sites of Japan (Kōchi)
