= Tosa, Kōchi =

Tosa 土佐市
- City
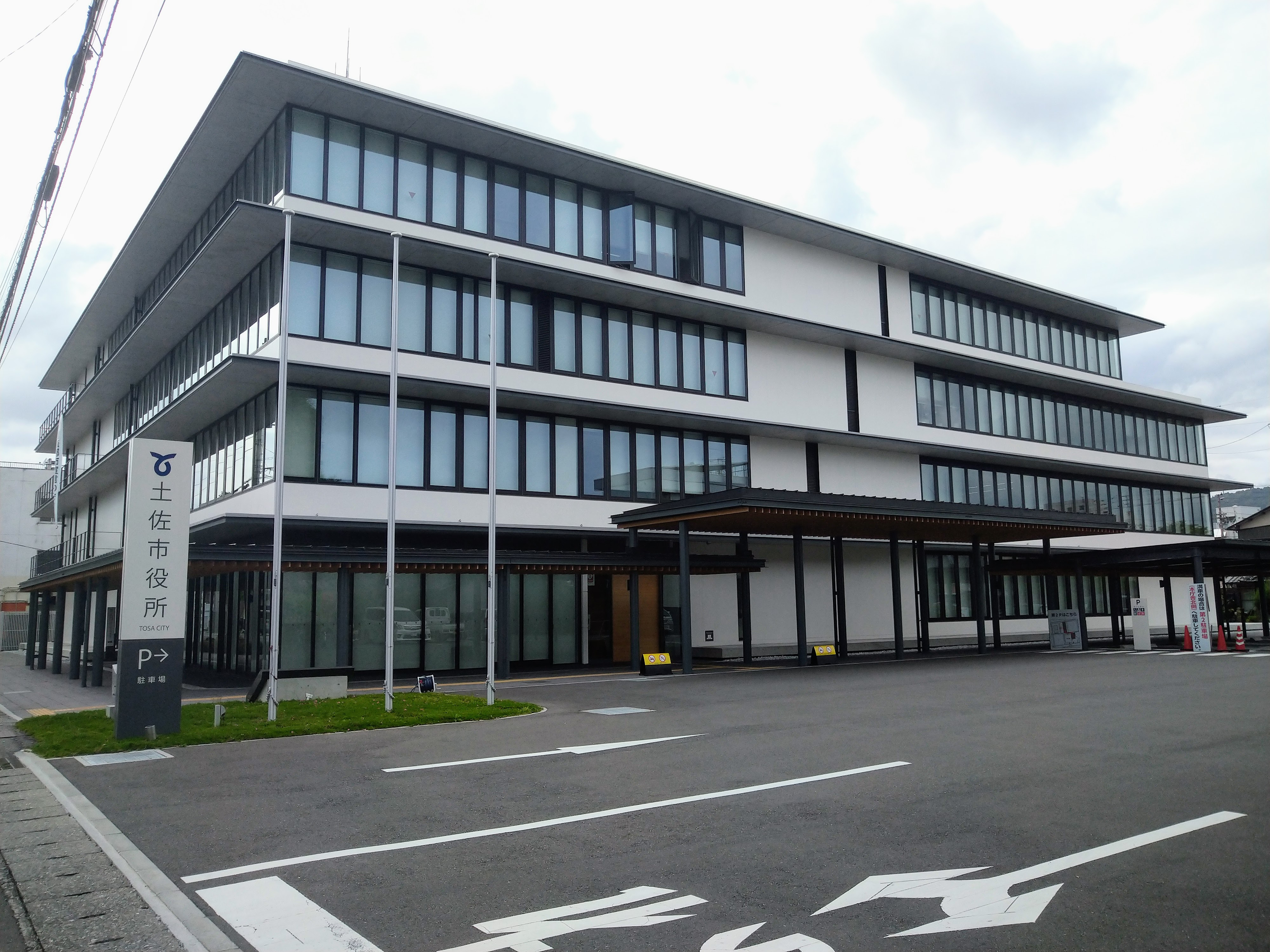
- Tosa city hall

- Flag Seal
- Location of Tosa in Kōchi Prefecture

- Location in Japan
- Coordinates: 33°30′N 133°26′E
- Country: Japan
- Region: Shikoku
- Prefecture: Kōchi

Government
  - Mayor: Yoshifumi Itahara (since October 2007)

Area
  - Total: 91.50 km^{2} (35.33 sq mi)

Population (1 August 2022)
  - Total: 26,427
  - Density: 288.8/km^{2} (748.0/sq mi)
- Time zone: UTC+09:00 (JST)
- City hall address: 2017-1 Kinoe, Takaoka-chō, Tosa-shi, Kōchi-ken 781-1192
- Website: Official website
- Symbols
- Bird: White-cheeked starling
- Flower: Lilium
- Tree: Ginkgo

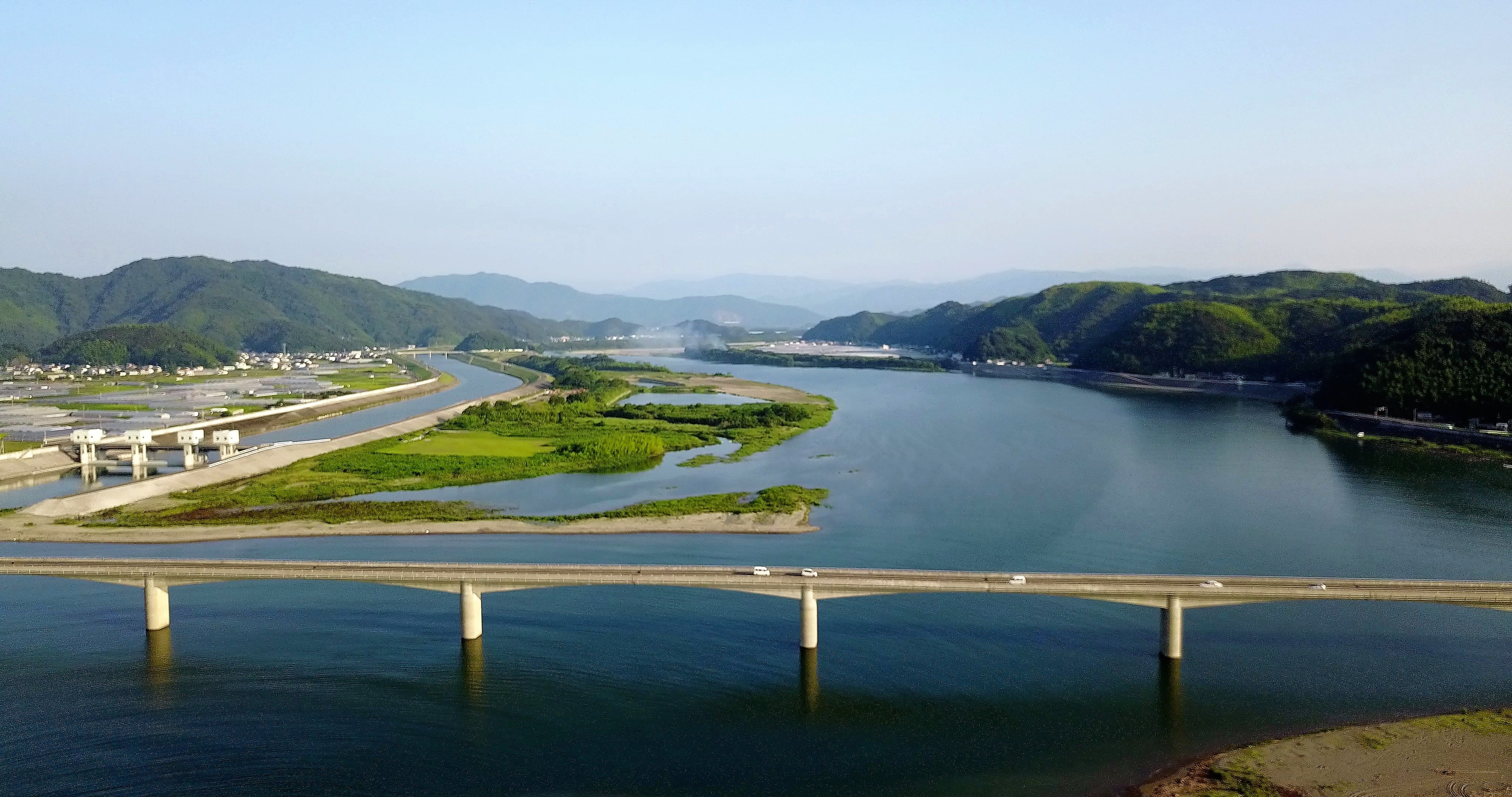
Niyodo River in Tosa

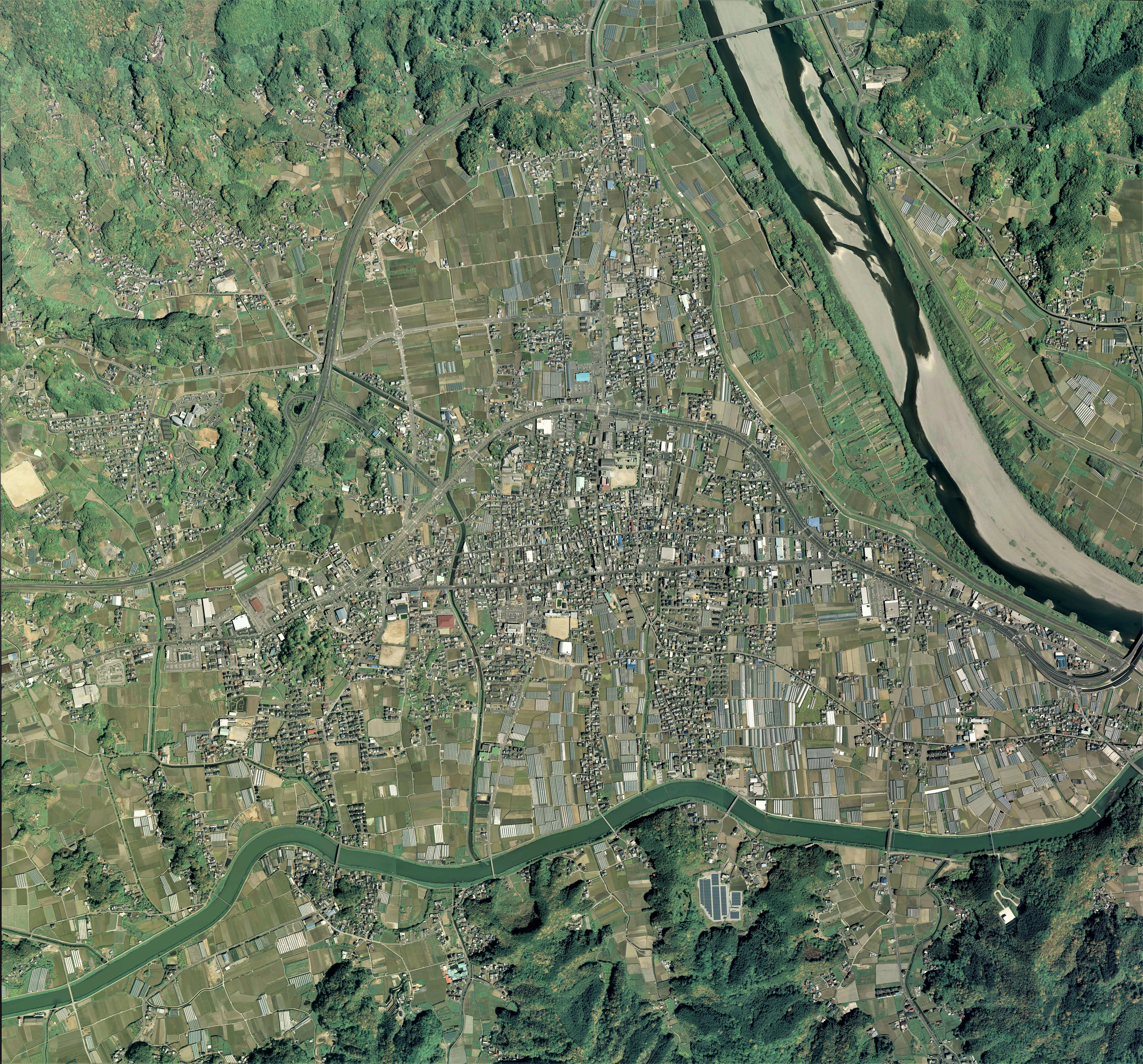
Aerial view of Tosa city center

Tosa (土佐市, Tosa-shi; Japanese pronunciation: [tó̞.sä̀, tò̞.sä́(.ɕì)]) is a city located in Kōchi Prefecture, Japan. As of 1 August 2022, the city had an estimated population of 26,427 in 12,671 households and a population density of 290 persons per km^{2}. The total area of the city is 91.50 square kilometres (35.33 sq mi). The city of Tosa should not be confused with the historical Tosa Province, which covered all of modern-day Kōchi Prefecture.

== Geography ==
Tosa is located in central Kōchi Prefecture on the southern coast of the island of Shikoku, and faces the Shikoku Mountains to the north and Pacific Ocean to the south. The Niyodo River flows through the Takaoka Plain in the town, where rice is grown.

=== Surrounding municipalities ===
Kōchi Prefecture

- Hidaka
- Ino
- Kōchi
- Sakawa
- Susaki

=== Climate ===
Tosa has a humid subtropical climate (Köppen Cfa) characterized by warm summers and cool winters with light snowfall. The average annual temperature in Tosa is 15.9 °C. The average annual rainfall is 2631 mm with September as the wettest month. The temperatures are highest on average in January, at around 25.9 °C, and lowest in January, at around 5.8 °C.

== Demographics ==
Per Japanese census data, the population of Tosa has remained relatively stable for the past century.

Historical population
Year	Pop.	±%
1920	28,057	—
1930	28,067	+0.0%
1940	26,804	−4.5%
1950	34,107	+27.2%
1960	31,803	−6.8%
1970	29,905	−6.0%
1980	31,677	+5.9%
1990	31,564	−0.4%
2000	30,338	−3.9%
2010	28,686	−5.4%
2020	25,732	−10.3%

== History ==
As with all of Kōchi Prefecture, the area of Tosa was part of ancient Tosa Province. Remains from the Jōmon period dated to 4000 years ago have been found within the city limits. During the Edo period, the area was part of the holdings of Tosa Domain ruled by the Yamauchi clan from their seat at Kōchi Castle. Following the Meiji restoration, the village of Takaoka (高岡村) was established within Takaoka District, Kōchi with the creation of the modern municipalities system on October 1, 1889. Takaoka was elevated to town status on March 1, 1899. Takaoka was elevated to city status on January 1, 1959, and renamed Tosa.

== Government ==
Tosa has a mayor-council form of government with a directly elected mayor and a unicameral city council of 15 members. Tosa contributes one member to the Kōchi Prefectural Assembly. In terms of national politics, the city is part of Kōchi 1st district of the lower house of the Diet of Japan.

== Economy ==
Benefiting from the warm climate and abundant water, the area has long been a prosperous region for agriculture, with greenhouse horticulture in the plains and fruit tree cultivation in the surrounding mountains. In addition, the rich subsoil water of the Niyodo River has nurtured the paper industry, and in the Usa neighborhood, which faces the Pacific Ocean, coastal fishing and seafood processing have developed as key industries.

== Education ==
Tosa has nine public elementary schools and three public middle schools operated by the city government and two public high schools operated by the Kōchi Prefectural Department of Education. There is also one private high school. The Kochi Professional University of Rehabilitation is located in Tosa.

== Transportation ==
=== Railway ===
Tosa does not have any passenger railway service. The nearest train station is Ino Station on the JR Shikoku Dosan Line.

=== Highways ===
- Kōchi Expressway
- National Route 56

== Sister cities ==
- (Japan) Ebetsu, Hokkaidō, since July 15, 1978
- Itatiba, São Paulo, Brazil, since August 5, 1989

== Local attractions ==
- Kiyotaki-ji, 35th temple on the Shikoku Pilgrimage
- Shōryū-ji, 36th temple on the Shikoku Pilgrimage

== Notable people ==
- Chisako Hara, actress
- Michiharu Kusunoki, manga artist
- Seito Saibara, politician, missionary, colonist, and farmer
- Hagiko Umezu, trade unionist
