= Tani Jinzan =

- Born: April 18, 1663; Nankoku, Kōchi, Japan
- Died: July 27, 1718 (aged 55); Kami, Kōchi, Japan
- Other names: Tani Shigetō

Tani Jinzan (谷秦山; April 18, 1663 - July 27, 1718) was the pseudonym for a Japanese Shintoist, astronomer, Confucian scholar and forerunner of the kokugaku movement which would lead to the events of the Bakumatsu period and Meiji restoration in Japanese history. His real name was Tani Shigetō (谷重遠) and he was also known commonly as "Tanzaburō".

== Biography ==
Tani was born the third son of a Shinto priest in Okatoyo Hachiman (now Nankoku, Kōchi). At the age of 17, he was sent to Kyoto to study Neo-Confucianism, Shintoism, and calendar studies under Yamazaki Ansai and Asami Keisai. At the age of 32, he traveled to Edo to study under the celebrated Shibukawa Shunkai, and completed work on what would later be termed the Tosa Nangaku (土佐南学) school of philosophy. In 1702, at the age of forty, he was summoned home to Tosa Domain by the 5th daimyō, Yamauchi Toyofusa, and gave lectures to the feudal retainers at Kōchi. During this time, he also accurately calculated the latitude of Kōchi Castle at just over 33.5 degrees north, well over a century before the much more famous Ino Tadataka began his survey of Japan. However, he fell out of favor during a succession dispute over the 6th daimyō, Yamauchi Toyotaka and was banished from Kōchi Castle and sent to live under house arrest in Tosayamada, now part of the city of Kami, Kōchi. During that time, he studied kokugaku and wrote numerous treatises on national polity, natural history, and the ritsuryō system, which exerted a great influence on later generations. The Meiij period general and politician Tani Tateki was Tani Jinzan's descendant.

He died suddenly at the age of 56. His tombstone, located in Tosayamada, is a simple natural river stone about 30 cm high. It was designated as a National Historic Site in 1944. It is located about 20 minutes on foot from Tosa-Yamada Station on the JR Shikoku Dosan Line.
