= Shōryū-ji =

Shingon temple in Tosa, Kōchi Prefecture, Japan

- 青龍寺
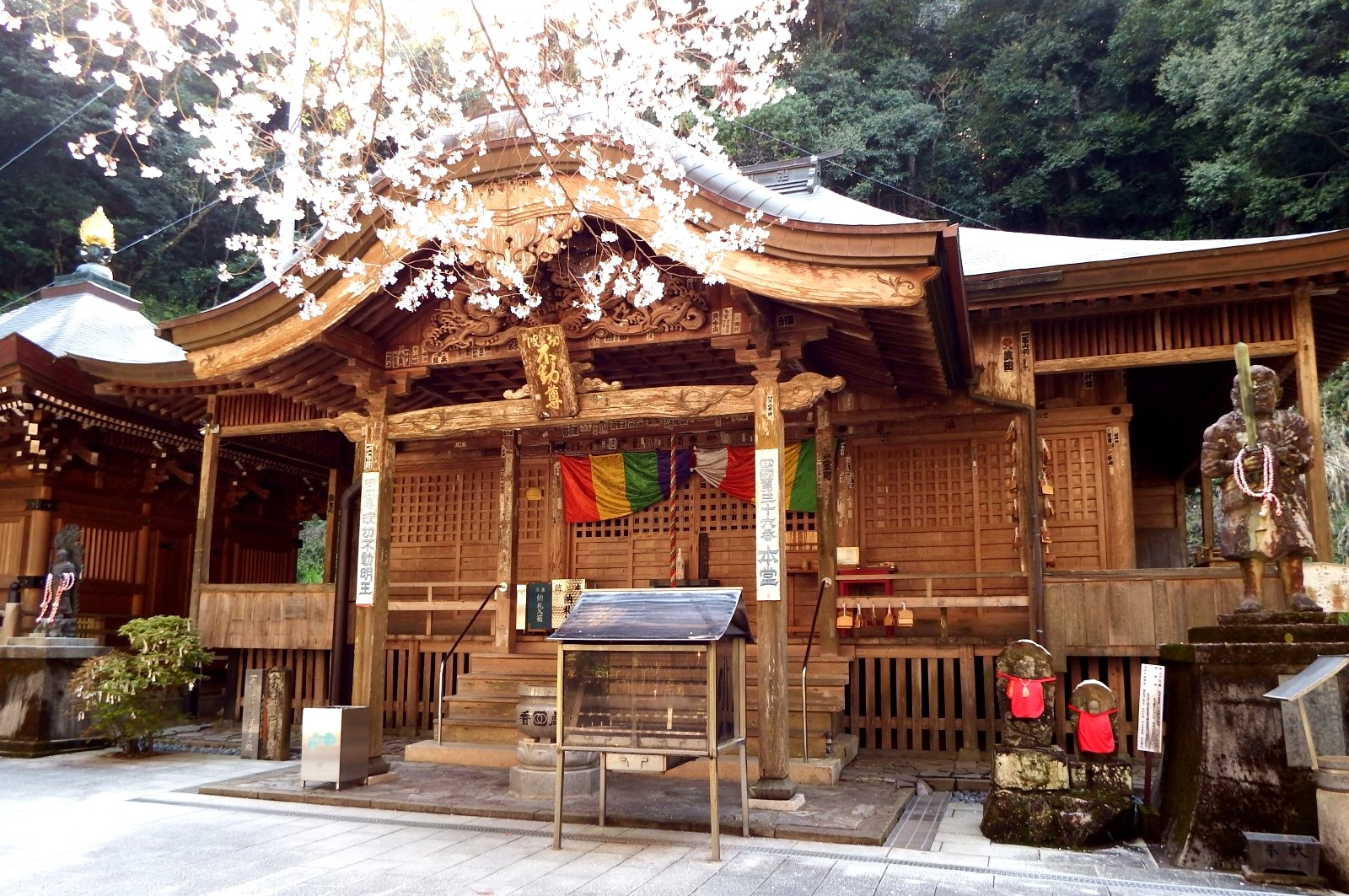

Religion
- Affiliation: Shingon

Location
- Location: Kōchi-ken
- Country: Japan
- Interactive map of Shōryū-ji
- Coordinates: 33°25′34″N 133°27′03″E

Website
- http://www.88shikokuhenro.jp/36shoryuji/

Shōryū-ji (青龍寺 kana: しょうりゅうじ) is a Shingon Buddhist Temple located in Tosa, Kōchi, Japan. It is the 36th temple of the Shikoku Pilgrimage.

The Honzon of worship at Shōryū-ji is Acala.

== History ==
According to the temple records, the temple was founded by Kukai during the Kōnin era (810–824). Following his travels to China, upon returning to Japan with the knowledge that Kukai's teacher Huiguo had bestowed upon him, Kukai grasped his vajra, prayed that he had arrived in a land he was destined to, and threw it eastwards.

Kukai sensed that the vajra he had thrown was inside a pine tree of the mountain Shōryū-ji is located on, and reported to Emperor Saga. During the 6th year of the Kounin era (815), remembering his master's teachings, Kukai founded the construction of Shoryu-ji, which shared the same name as his masters temple in Chang-an, Qinglong Temple (青龍寺). The Honzon Acala was chosen due to an experience Kukai had during a storm while returning to Japan, in which Acala was said to have appeared and cut the waves with a sword, saving them, which Kukai had carved as the Honzon.

The temple was in ruins by the beginning of the Edo period (1603–1868), but the second feudal lord of the Tosa domain, Yamauchi Tadayoshi, had it restored during the Shōhō era (1644–1648). However, due to an earthquake and tsunami in 1707, it was rebuilt near the end of the Edo period.
