= Kagami, Kōchi =

Kagami in Kōchi Prefecture was the name of:

- Kagami, Kōchi (Kami), a former town in Kami District, Kōchi (now part of Kōnan, Kōchi)
- Kagami, Kōchi (Tosa), a former village in Tosa District, Kōchi (now part of Kōchi, Kōchi)
