= Kōchi, Kōchi =

Kōchi 高知市
- Prefecture capital and Core city
- Kōchi City
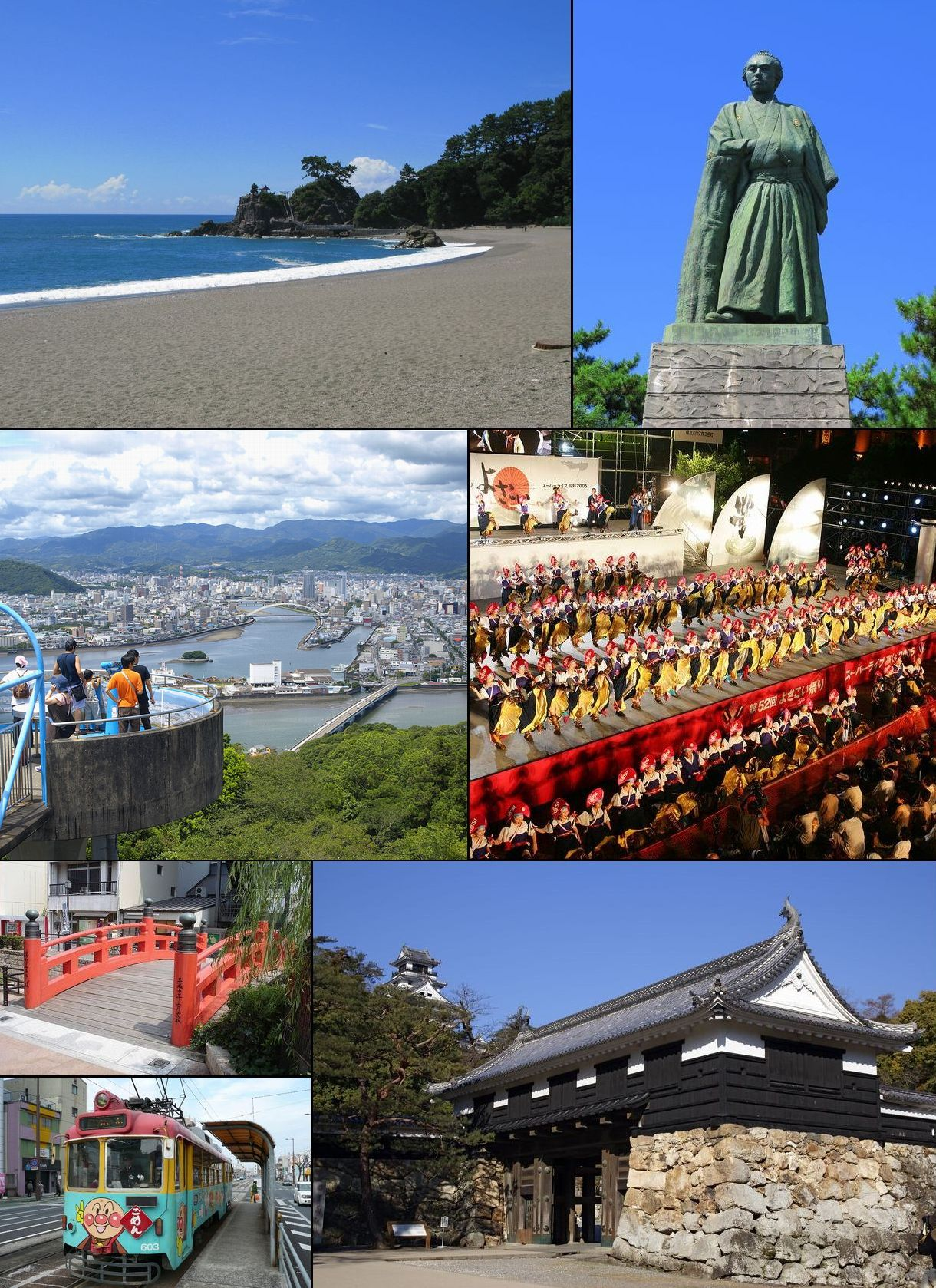
- From top left: Katsurahama, Statue of Sakamoto Ryoma, View of Kōchi from Mt. Godai, Yosakoi Festival, Harimayabashi, Tosa Electric Railway, Kōchi Castle

- Flag Chapter
- Interactive map of Kōchi
- Location in Japan
- Coordinates: 33°33′32″N 133°31′53″E
- Country: Japan
- Region: Shikoku
- Prefecture: Kōchi

Government
  - Mayor: Ryugo Kuwana

Area
  - Total: 309.00 km^{2} (119.31 sq mi)

Population (April 1, 2023)
  - Total: 318,520
  - Density: 1,030.8/km^{2} (2,669.8/sq mi)
- Time zone: UTC+09:00 (JST)
- City hall address: 5-1-45 Honmachi, Kōchi-shi 780-0571
- Website: Official website
- Symbols
- Bird: Japanese wagtail
- Flower: Winter-hazel
- Tree: Chinaberry

Kōchi (高知市, Kōchi-shi; Japanese pronunciation: [kó̞ò̞.c̟͡ɕì, kò̞ó̞.c̟͡ɕi̥.ɕì, kó̞ó̞.c̟͡ɕi̥-], locally [kò̞ó̞.c̟͡ɕí]) is the capital city of Kōchi Prefecture located on the island of Shikoku in Japan. With over 40% of the prefectural population, Kōchi is the main commercial and industrial centre and the "primate city" of the prefecture. As of 1 April 2023, the city had an estimated population of 311,224 in 163,479 households, and a population density of 1,000 persons per km^{2}. The total area of the city is 309.00 square kilometres (119.31 sq mi).

== Overview ==
A symbol of the city is its most famous dish, katsuo tataki, made by lightly searing and seasoning bonito.

=== Cityscape ===
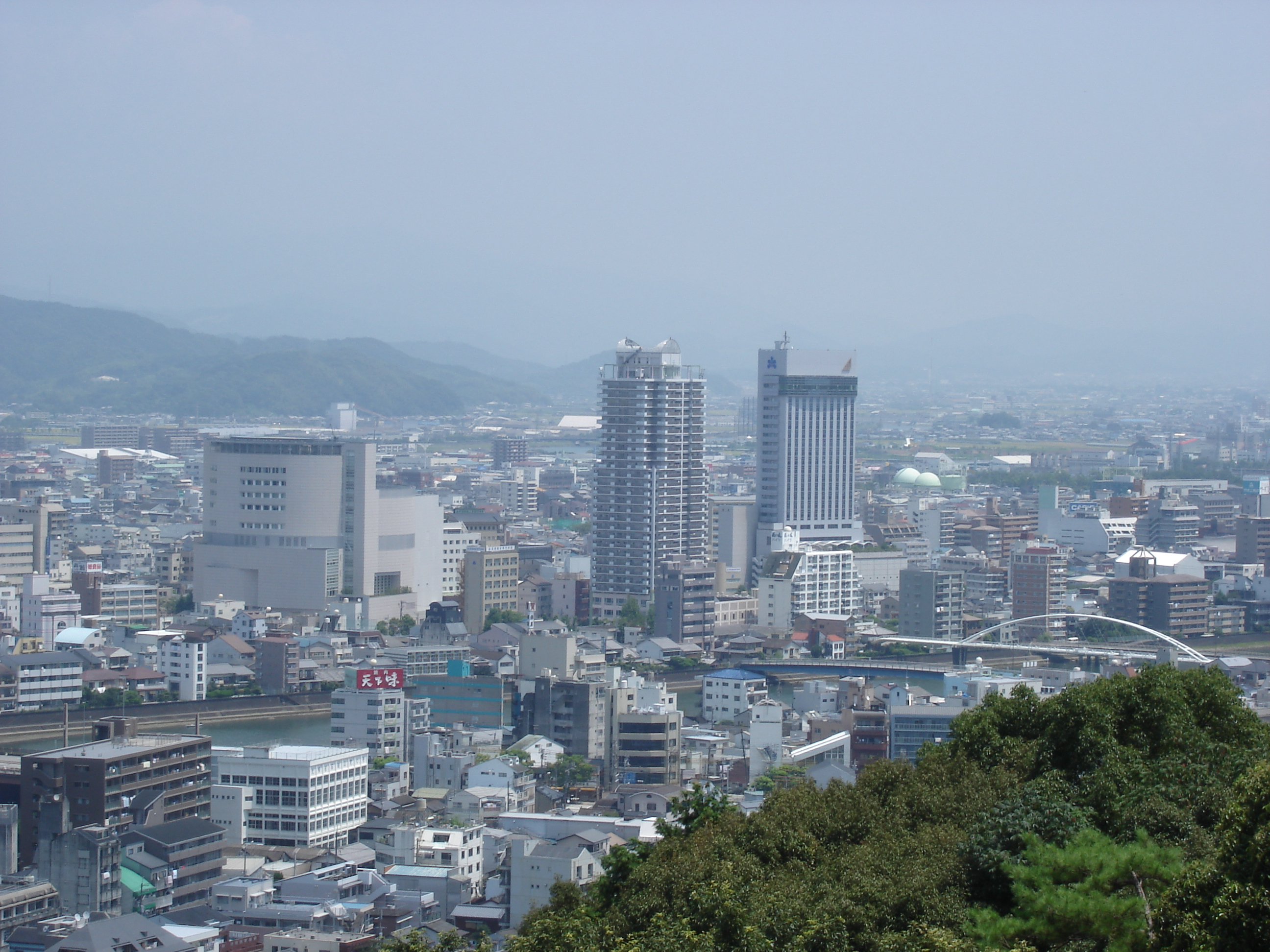
Skyline of Kōchi City（2006）

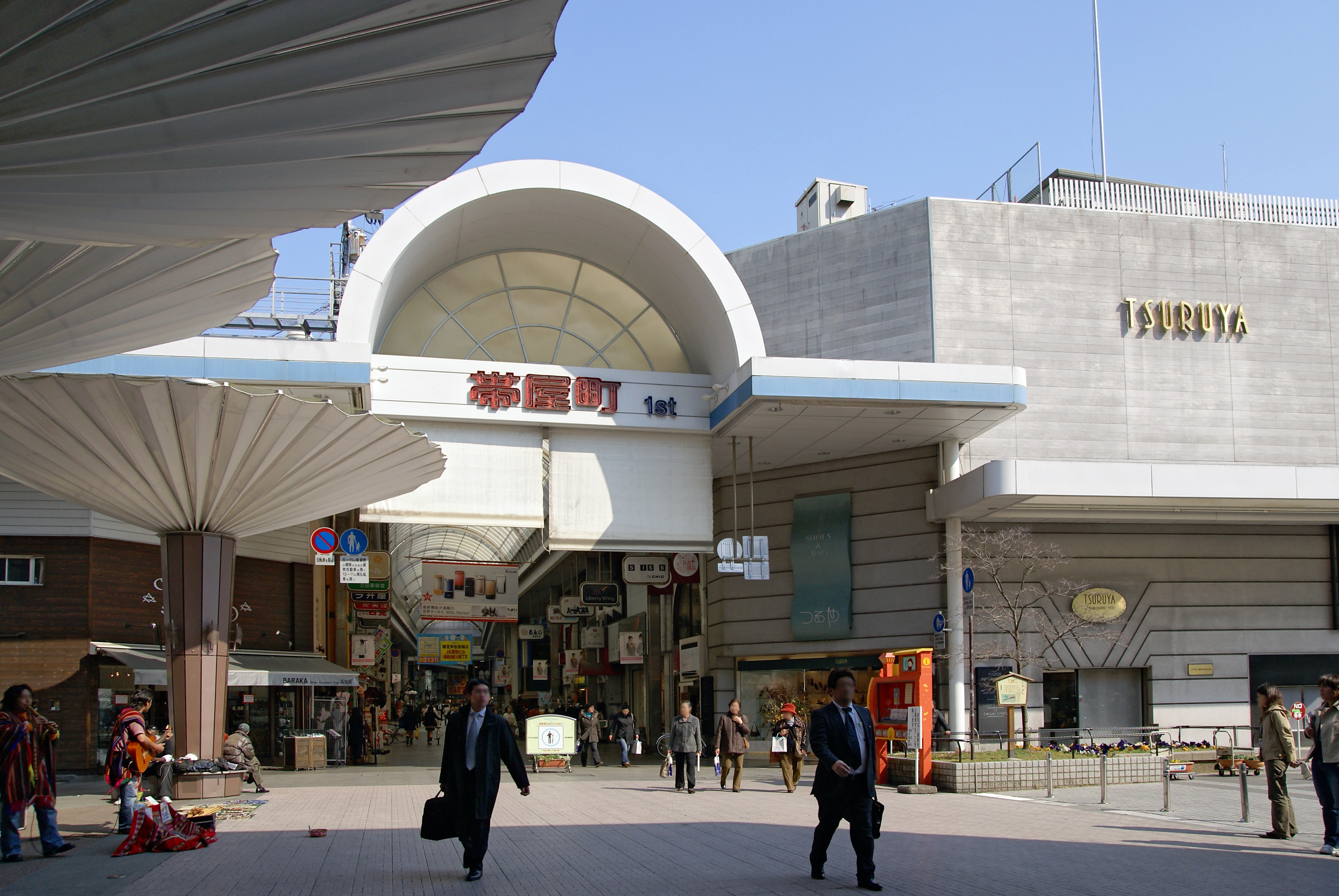
Obiyamachi in Downtown Kōchi City（2008）

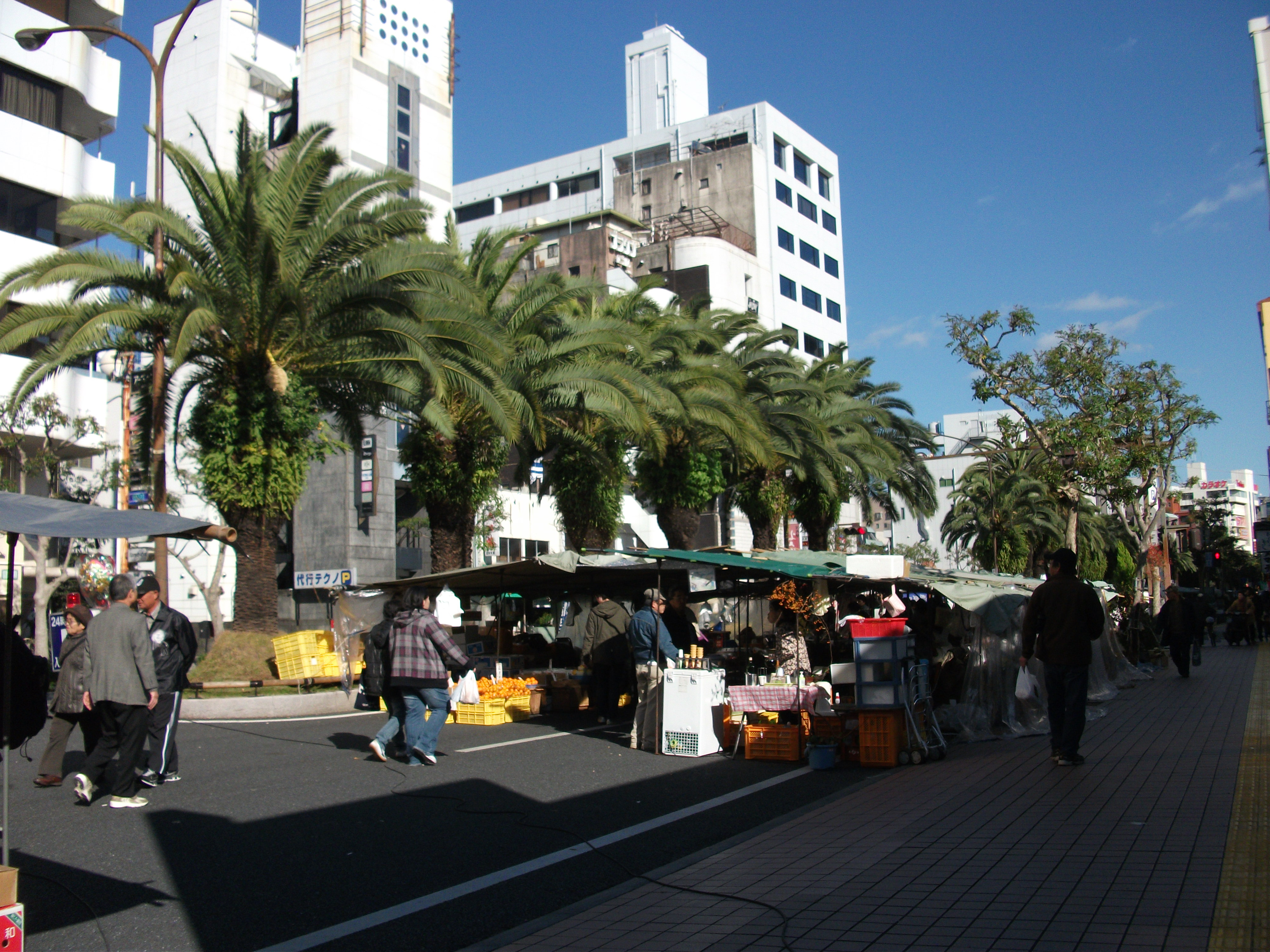
Sunday street markets（2009）

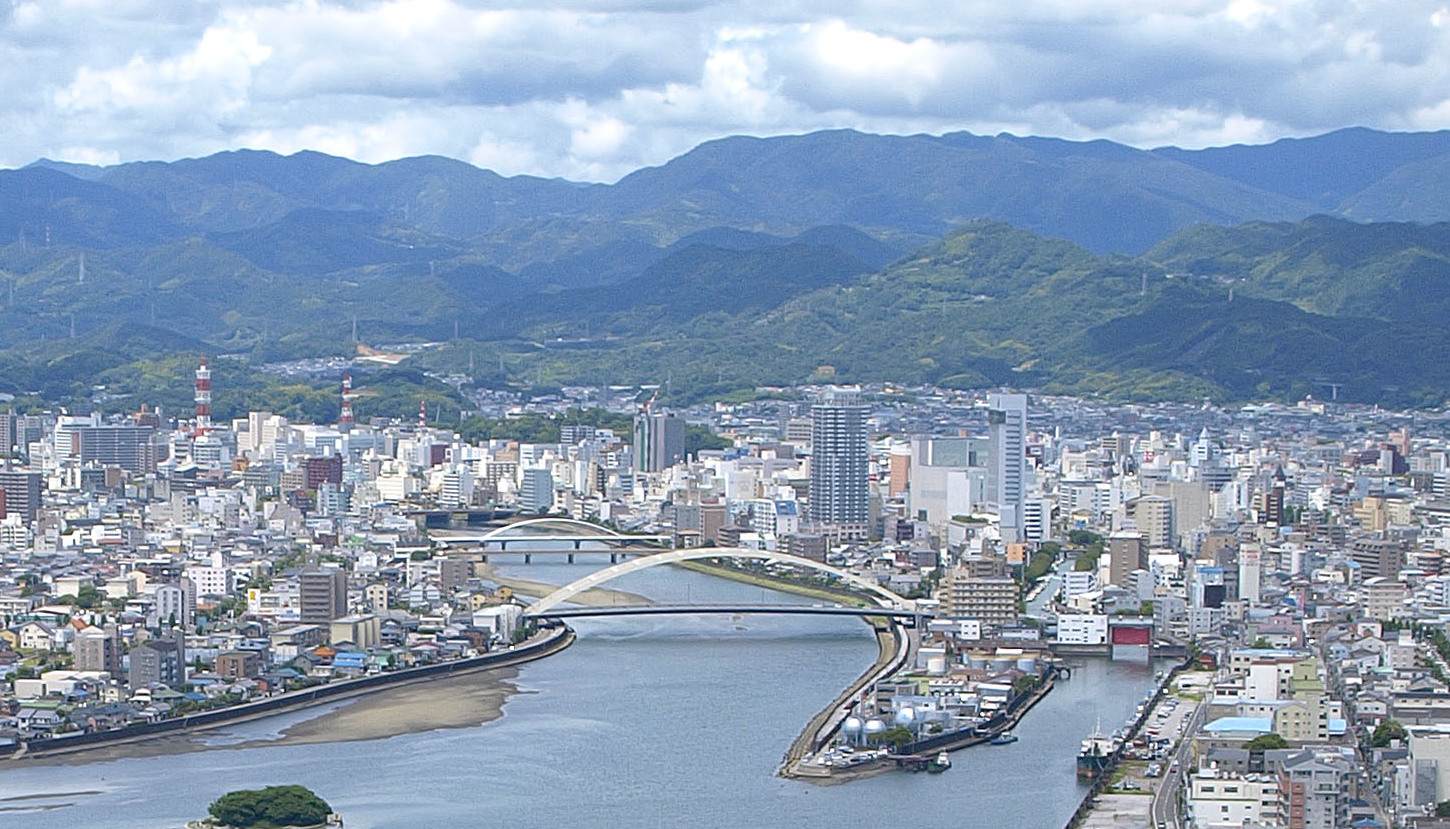
CBD of Kōchi City（2010）

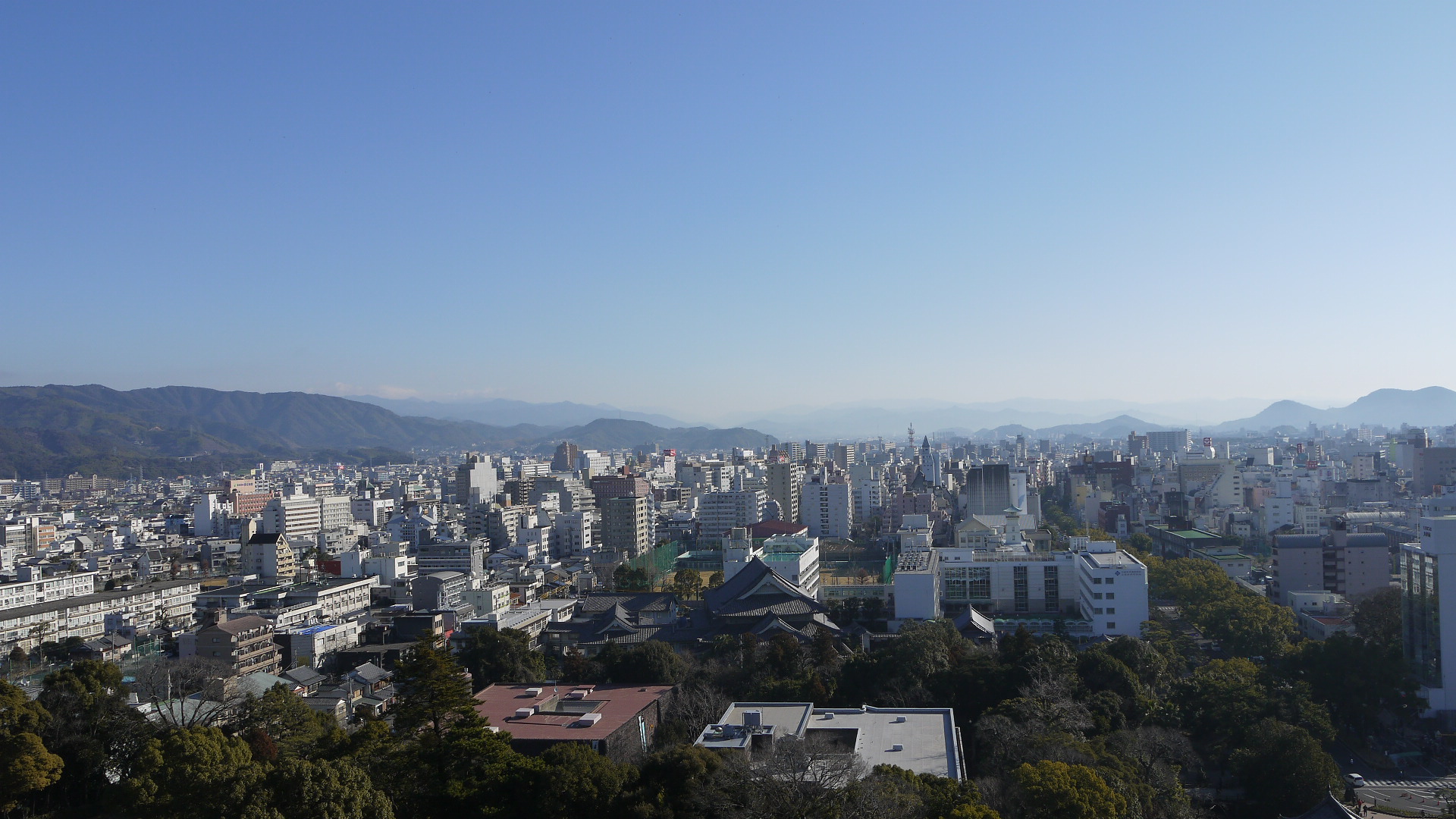
Views from Kōchi Castle Keep Tower（2013）

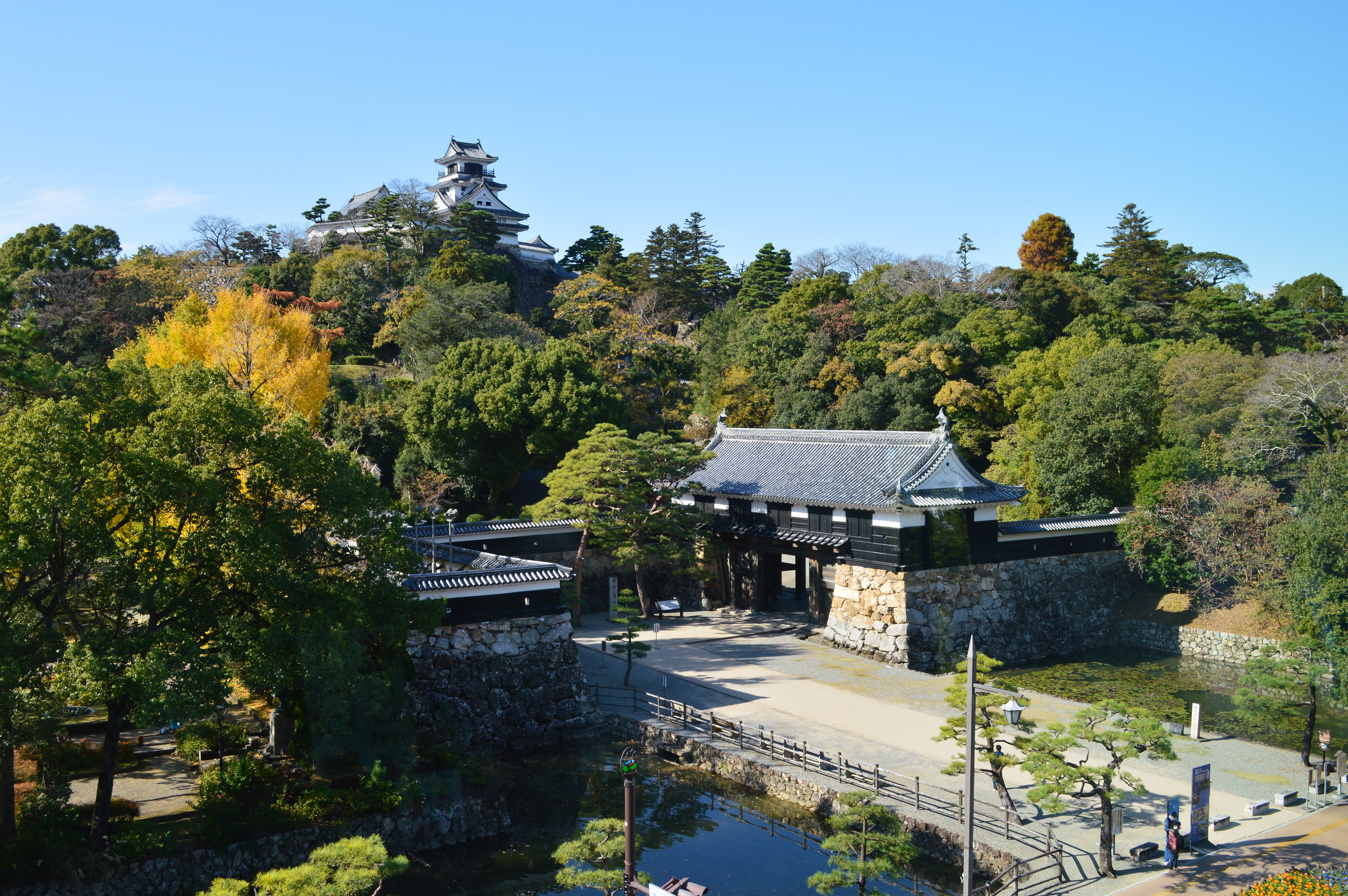
Kōchi Castle（2020）

== Geography ==
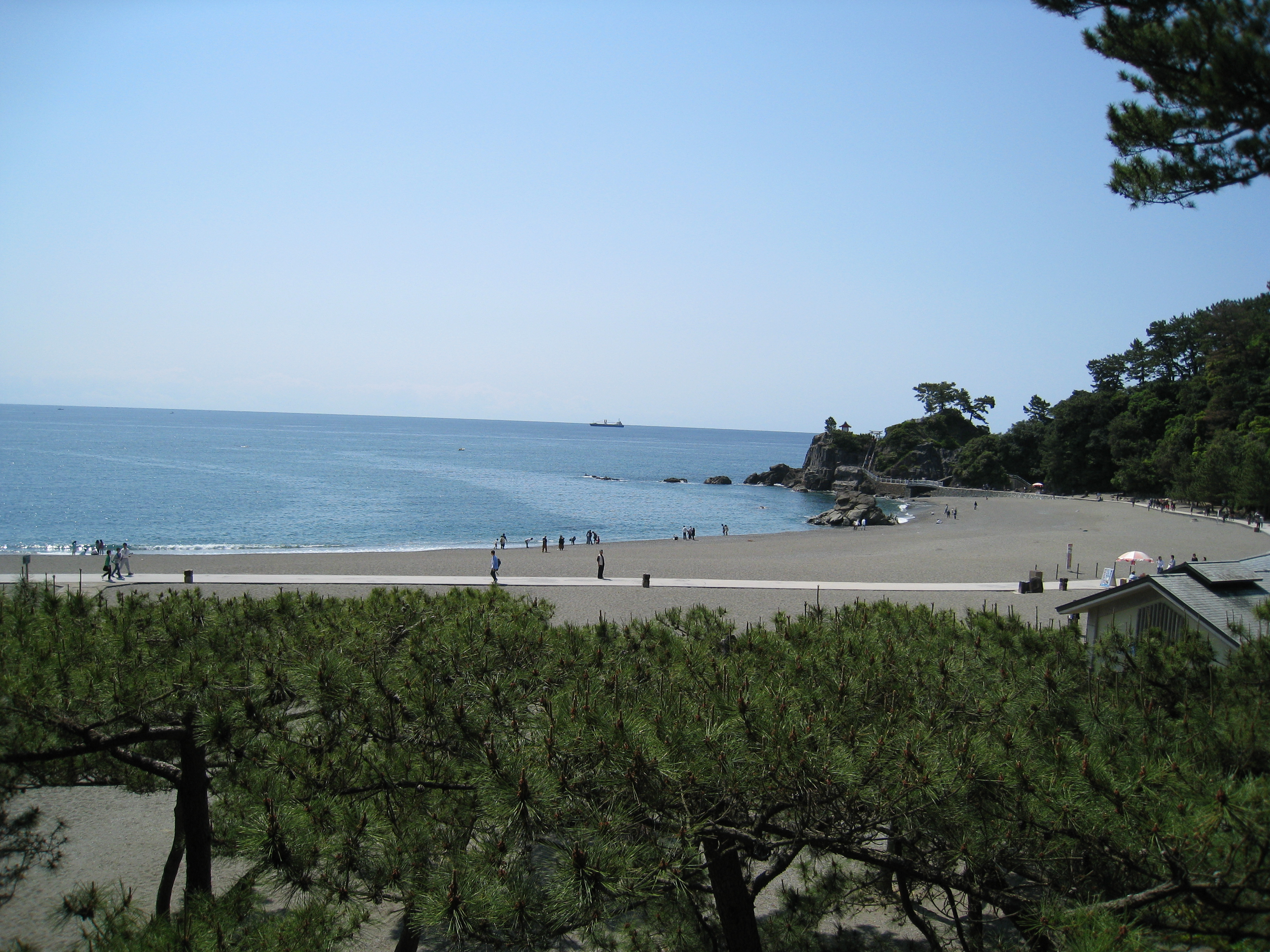
Katsurahama

Kōchi is located on the southern coast of Kōchi Prefecture, facing the Pacific Ocean to the south. The city area can be divided into three distinct geographic sections. The urban centre lies at the head of Urado Bay, in a narrow alluvial plain crossed by several rivers, notably the Kagami River and Kokubu River. The plain is bounded by mountains to the north and a range of hills to the south and west.

The northern mountains form the least densely populated part of the city, with the only settlement being along narrow river valleys. The highest point in Kōchi is Kuishi-yama at 1,176 metres (3,858 ft).

To the south of the city centre, Urado Bay cuts through the hills to its outlet into the Pacific Ocean. The land surrounding the bay and a small strip of the coastline form the third part of the city. This area, although hillier and less dense than the plain, is nevertheless a major location of housing and port-related industry.

=== Neighbouring municipalities ===
Kōchi Prefecture

- Ino
- Nankoku
- Tosa City
- Tosa Town

=== Climate ===
Kōchi has a very wet humid subtropical climate (Köppen climate classification Cfa), receiving twice as much rainfall as Shikoku's other chief cities Matsuyama and Takamatsu. It is also the most typhoon-prone of Japan's major cities owing to its location directly exposed to the open Pacific Ocean from which the storms enter the country, and has twice received over 50 cm (20 in) of rainfall in a day from a typhoon.

Climate data for Kochi (1991-2020 normals, extremes 1886-present)
Month	Jan	Feb	Mar	Apr	May	Jun	Jul	Aug	Sep	Oct	Nov	Dec	Year
Record high °C (°F)	23.5 (74.3)	25.2 (77.4)	26.3 (79.3)	30.0 (86.0)	32.9 (91.2)	34.7 (94.5)	38.3 (100.9)	38.4 (101.1)	37.3 (99.1)	33.2 (91.8)	28.0 (82.4)	23.5 (74.3)	38.4 (101.1)
Mean maximum °C (°F)	17.7 (63.9)	19.8 (67.6)	22.4 (72.3)	26.2 (79.2)	29.5 (85.1)	31.8 (89.2)	34.9 (94.8)	35.7 (96.3)	33.6 (92.5)	29.9 (85.8)	24.8 (76.6)	20.4 (68.7)	36.2 (97.2)
Mean daily maximum °C (°F)	12.2 (54.0)	13.2 (55.8)	16.3 (61.3)	20.9 (69.6)	24.8 (76.6)	27.1 (80.8)	30.8 (87.4)	32.1 (89.8)	29.5 (85.1)	25.0 (77.0)	19.6 (67.3)	14.4 (57.9)	22.2 (72.0)
Daily mean °C (°F)	6.7 (44.1)	7.8 (46.0)	11.2 (52.2)	15.8 (60.4)	20.0 (68.0)	23.1 (73.6)	27.0 (80.6)	27.9 (82.2)	25.0 (77.0)	19.9 (67.8)	14.2 (57.6)	8.8 (47.8)	17.3 (63.1)
Mean daily minimum °C (°F)	2.1 (35.8)	3.1 (37.6)	6.4 (43.5)	10.9 (51.6)	15.5 (59.9)	19.7 (67.5)	23.9 (75.0)	24.5 (76.1)	21.4 (70.5)	15.6 (60.1)	9.7 (49.5)	4.2 (39.6)	13.1 (55.6)
Mean minimum °C (°F)	−2.5 (27.5)	−1.9 (28.6)	0.3 (32.5)	4.1 (39.4)	10.4 (50.7)	15.6 (60.1)	20.6 (69.1)	21.5 (70.7)	16.2 (61.2)	9.5 (49.1)	3.5 (38.3)	−0.6 (30.9)	−3.0 (26.6)
Record low °C (°F)	−7.6 (18.3)	−7.9 (17.8)	−6.5 (20.3)	−0.9 (30.4)	3.8 (38.8)	9.1 (48.4)	14.6 (58.3)	15.9 (60.6)	10.0 (50.0)	2.5 (36.5)	−1.9 (28.6)	−6.6 (20.1)	−7.9 (17.8)
Average precipitation mm (inches)	59.1 (2.33)	107.8 (4.24)	174.8 (6.88)	225.3 (8.87)	280.4 (11.04)	359.5 (14.15)	357.3 (14.07)	284.1 (11.19)	398.1 (15.67)	207.5 (8.17)	129.6 (5.10)	83.1 (3.27)	2,666.4 (104.98)
Average snowfall cm (inches)	0 (0)	0 (0)	0 (0)	0 (0)	0 (0)	0 (0)	0 (0)	0 (0)	0 (0)	0 (0)	0 (0)	0 (0)	1 (0.4)
Average precipitation days (≥ 0.5 mm)	6.0	7.5	10.5	10.4	11.1	15.1	13.7	12.9	13.2	9.0	7.3	6.4	123.2
Average relative humidity (%)	61	60	62	65	70	78	79	76	74	68	68	64	69
Mean monthly sunshine hours	190.7	177.2	192.2	197.3	195.7	133.8	173.7	204.0	162.0	179.6	168.8	184.6	2,159.7
Source: Japan Meteorological Agency

== Demographics ==
Per Japanese census data, the population of Kōchi increased rapidly in the 1960s and 1970s before peaking around the year 2000 and going into decline.

Historical population
Year	Pop.	±%
1920	133,277	—
1930	159,010	+19.3%
1940	163,182	+2.6%
1950	190,452	+16.7%
1960	221,737	+16.4%
1970	265,571	+19.8%
1980	318,266	+19.8%
1990	335,287	+5.3%
2000	348,979	+4.1%
2010	343,393	−1.6%
2020	326,545	−4.9%

== History ==
=== Feudal period ===
As with all of Kōchi Prefecture, the area of today Kōchi city was part of ancient Tosa Province. The river plain now containing the city centre was originally settled as a castle town around Kōchi Castle, the seat of the daimyō of Tosa Domain. The castle site was chosen by Yamauchi Kazutoyo in 1601 to replace the earlier seats of the Chōsokabe clan who had previously ruled in province. The city takes its name from that of the castle. As the centre of administration for the province, and the prefecture which succeeded it, the town rapidly grew to become the largest settlement of the region.

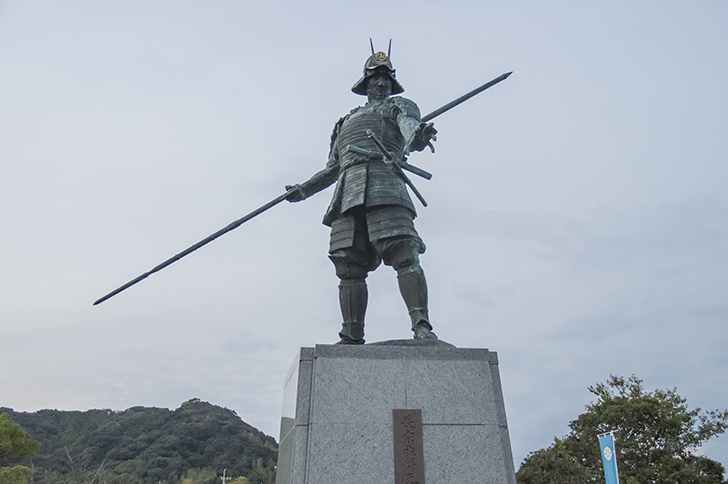
Chōsokabe Motochika

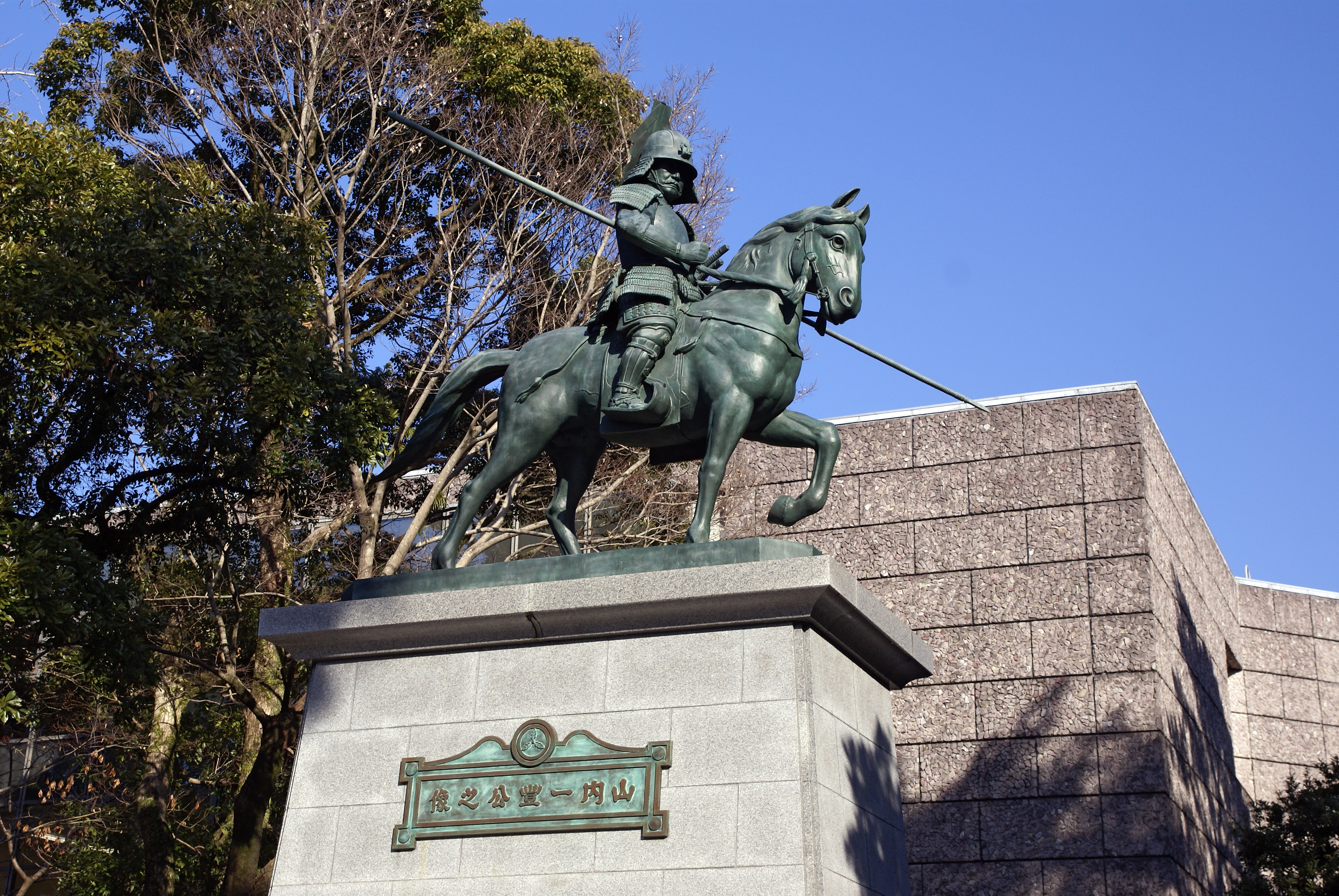
Yamauchi Kazutoyo

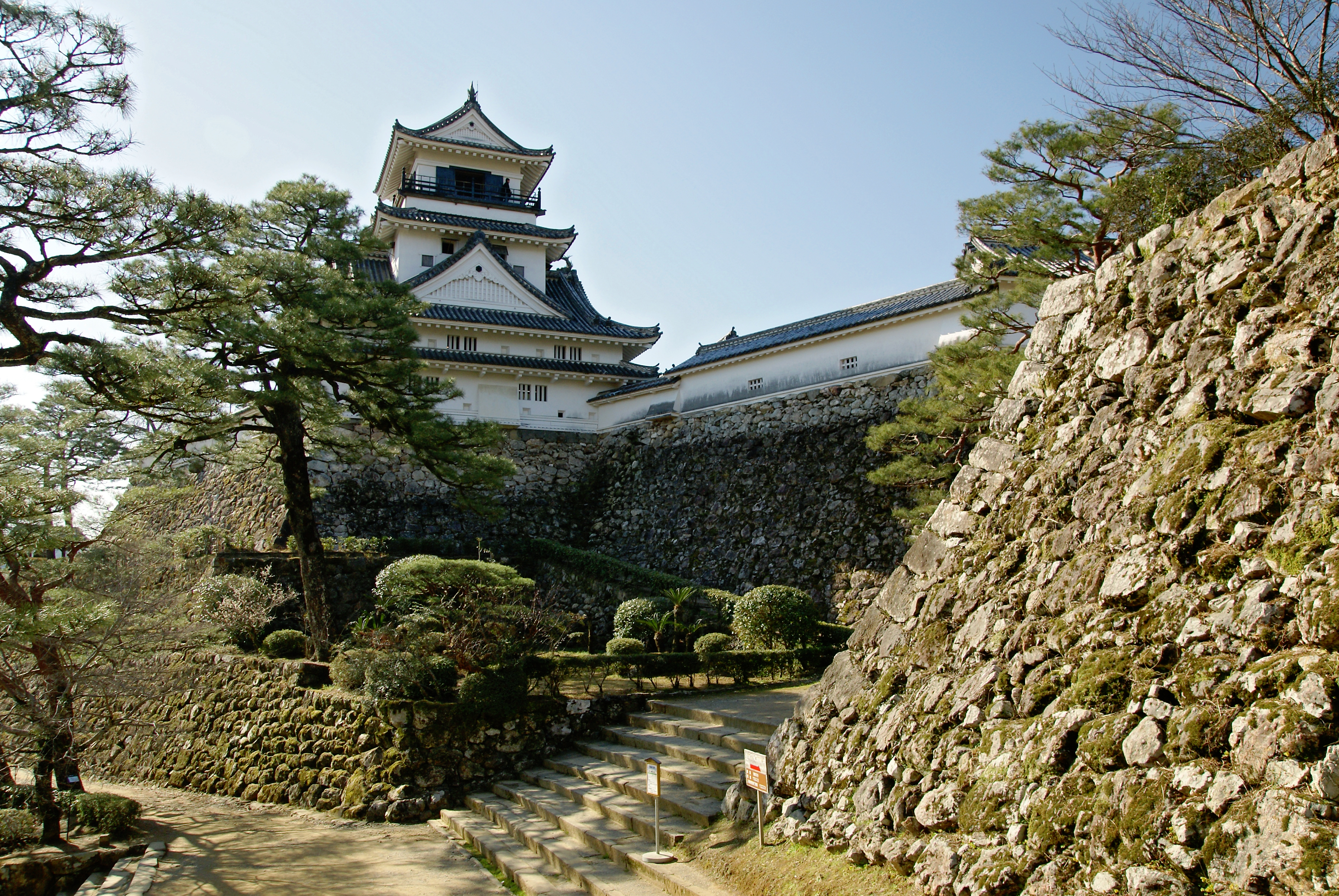
Kōchi Castle

=== Meiji period ===
During the time of the Meiji Restoration, Kōchi became famous as a centre of pro-imperial ideology, and later for incubating democratic and human rights movements. The city was incorporated on April 1, 1889, with the establishment of the modern municipalities system..

Tram service began in the city on May 2, 1904, and the city was connected to the national rail network on November 12, 1951.

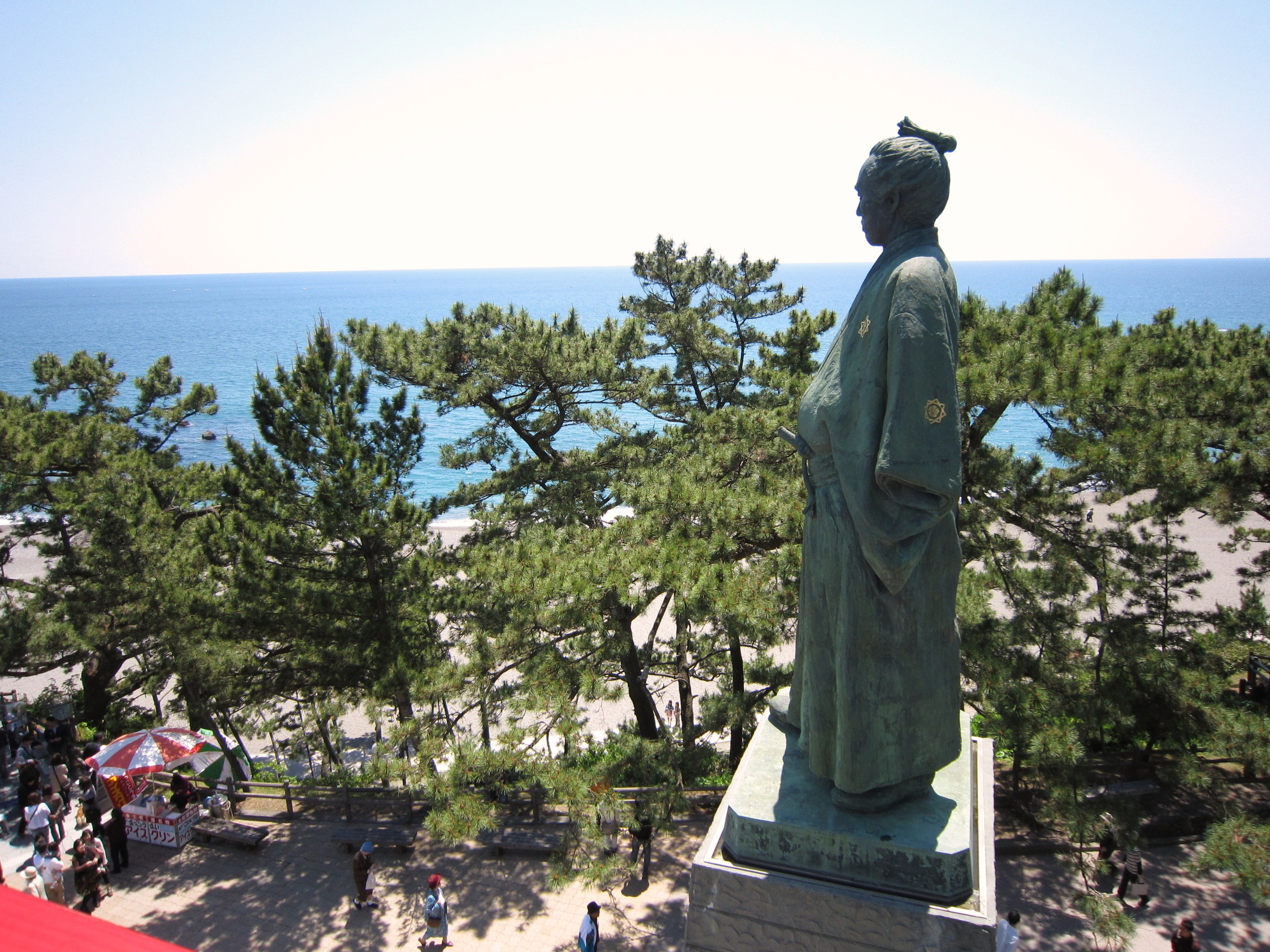
Sakamoto Ryouma

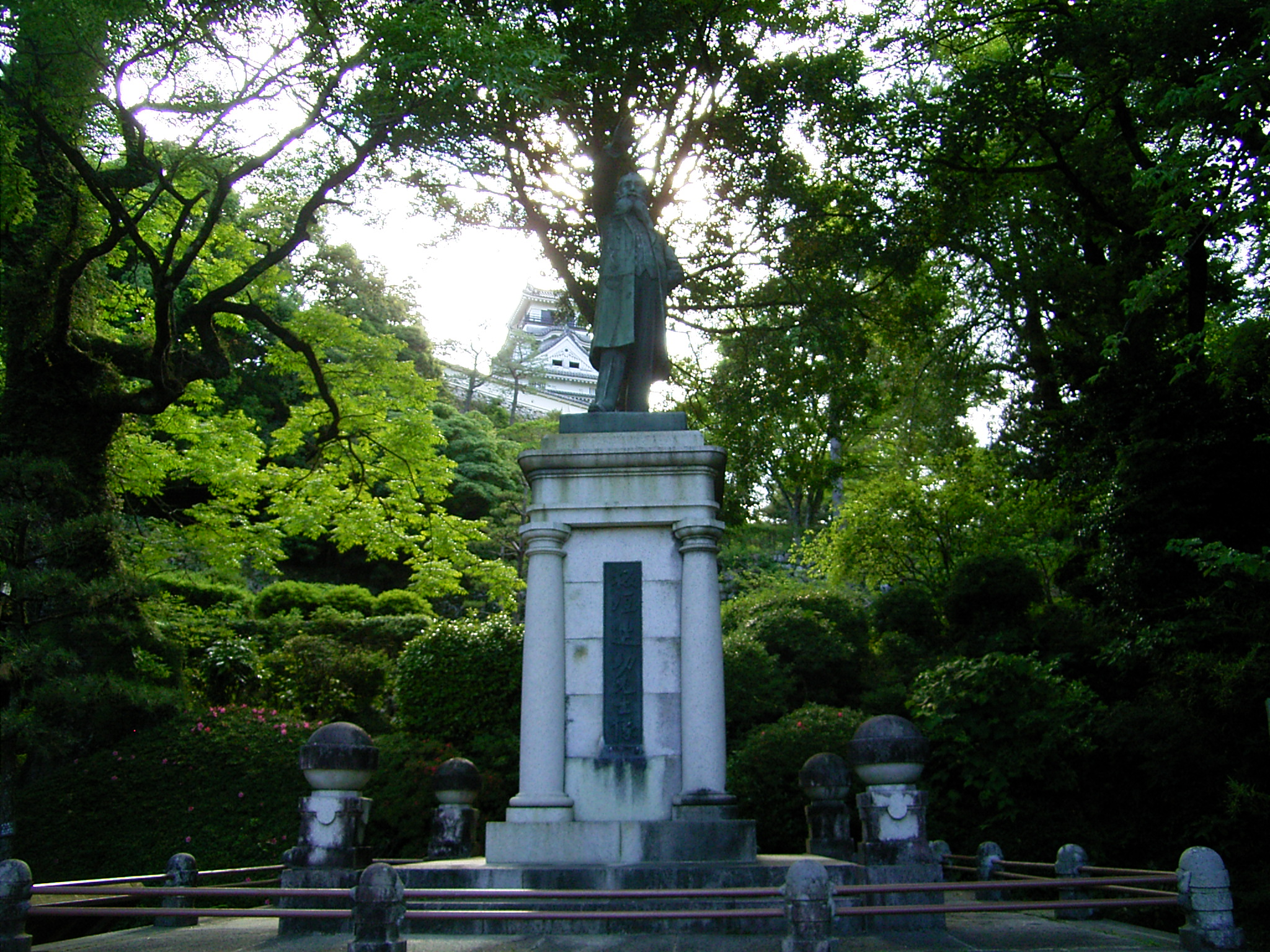
Itagaki Taisuke

=== WWII air raid ===
Kōchi was selected as a target by the United States' XXI Bomber Command because of the city's status as a prefectural capital, and the fact that it was a centre for industry and commercial trade. On July 3, 1945, at 6:22 pm (JST) 129 aircraft took off to bomb Kōchi. 1060 tons of incendiary bombs were dropped on Kōchi, destroying 48% of the built up areas of the city, killing 401 civilians and rendering over 40,000 homeless.

=== Modern period ===
On April 1, 1998, the city was designated as the first core city on Shikoku.

On January 1, 2005, the villages of Kagami and Tosayama, both from Tosa District were merged into Kōchi.

On January 1, 2008, the town of Haruno (from Agawa District) was also merged into Kōchi.

== Government ==
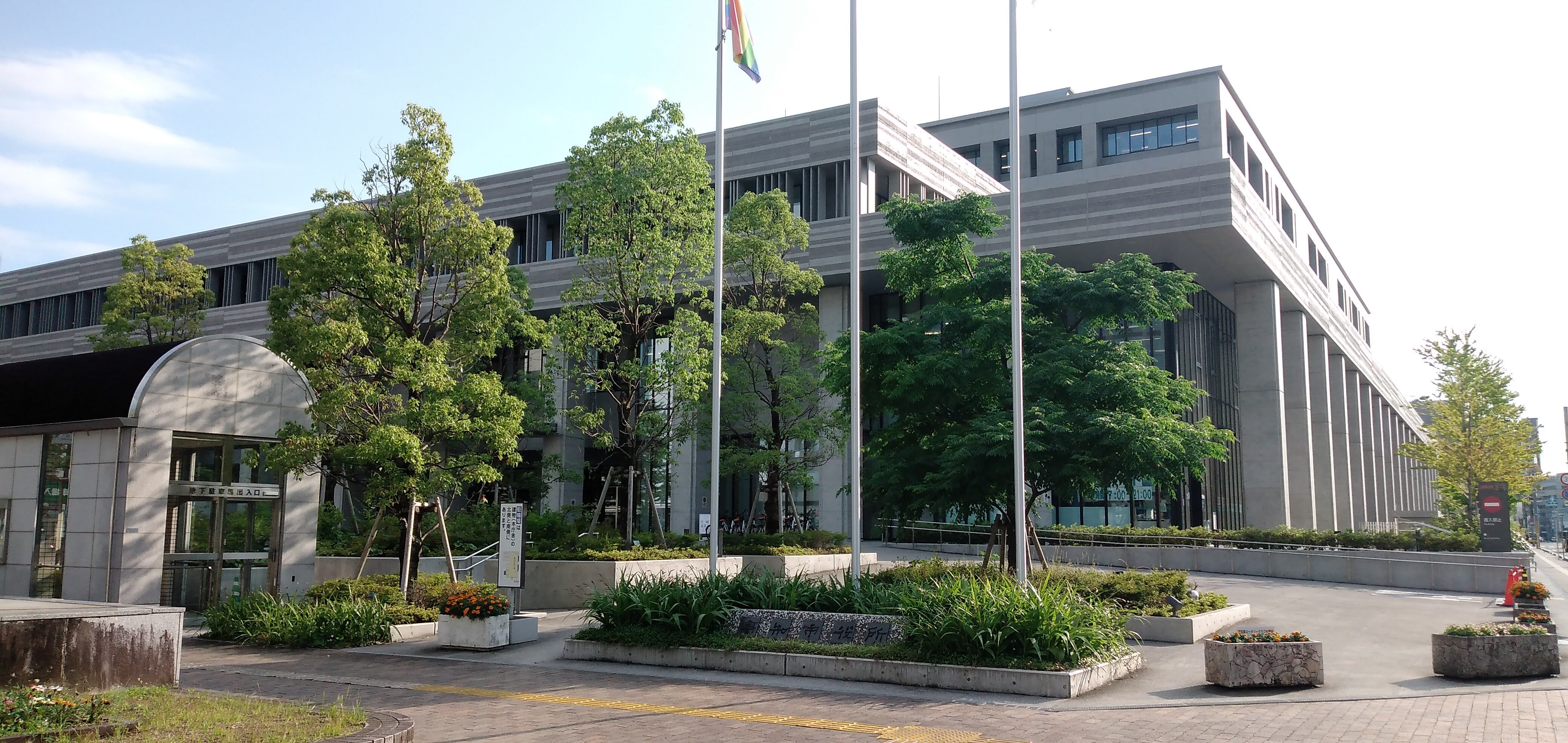
Kōchi city hall

Kōchi has a mayor-council form of government with a directly elected mayor and a unicameral city council of 42 members. The current mayor (since 2023) is Ryugo Kuwana.

Kōchi contributes 15 members to the Kōchi Prefectural Assembly. In terms of national politics, the city is divided between the Kōchi 1st district and Kōchi 2nd districts of the lower house of the Diet of Japan.

== International relations ==
=== International ===
Sister cities

City	Country	State	Since
Fresno	United States	California	February 11, 1965
Surabaya	Indonesia	East Java	April 17, 1997

Friendship cities

City	Country	State	since
Wuhu	China	Anhui	April 19, 1985
Mokpo	South Korea	South Jeolla Province	November 9, 2012

Sister ports

City	Country	State	since
Subic Bay	Philippines	Zambales	February 17, 1998
Port of Qingdao	China	Shandong	April 4, 1998
Port of Colombo	Sri Lanka	Colombo District	April 4, 1998
Port of Tanjung Perak	Indonesia	Surabaya	May 12, 1998

=== National ===
Sister cities

City	Region	Prefecture	Subprefecture	Since
Kitami	Hokkaidō region	(Hokkaido) Hokkaidō	Okhotsk	April 28, 1986

== Education ==
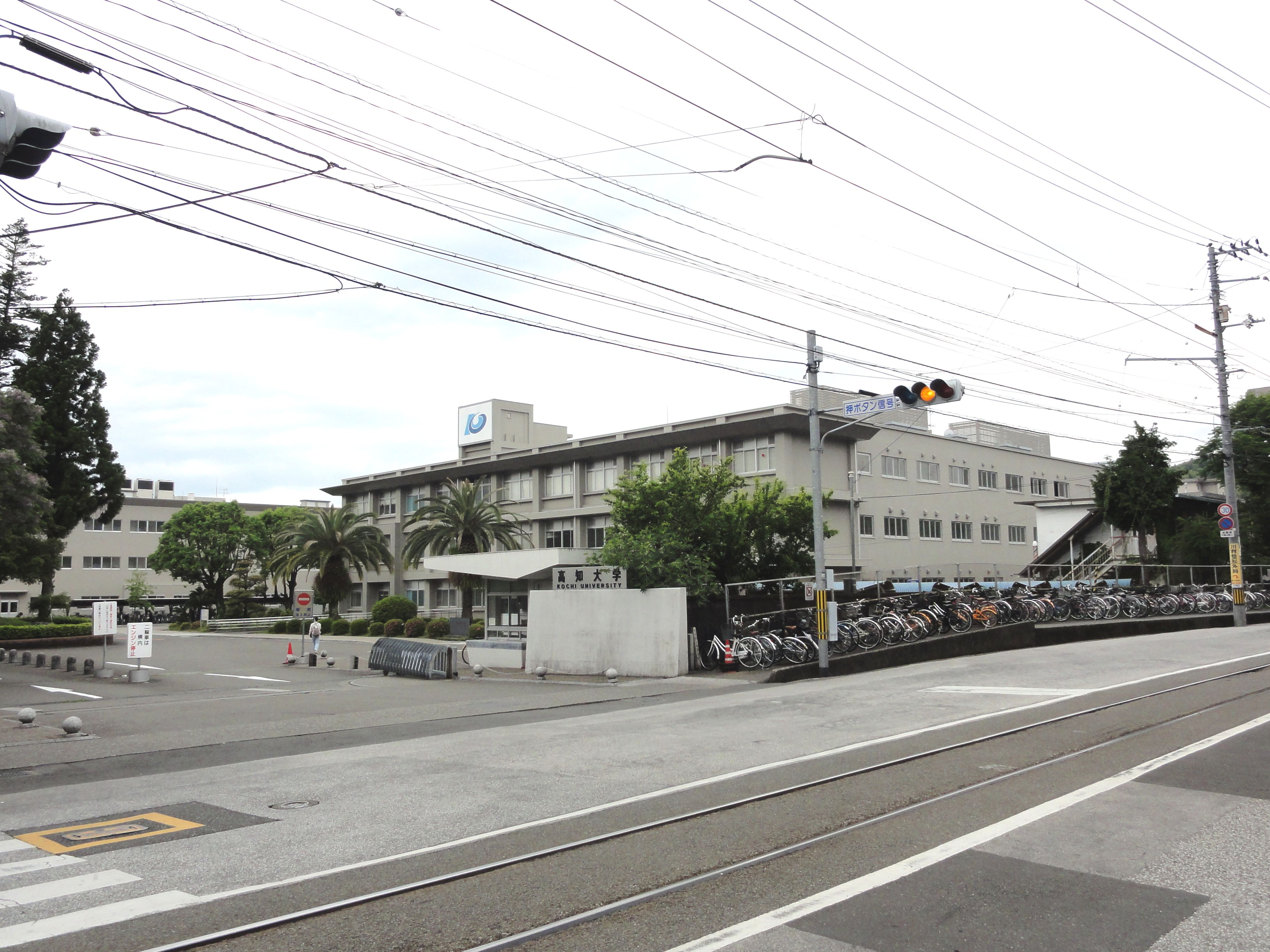
Kōchi University

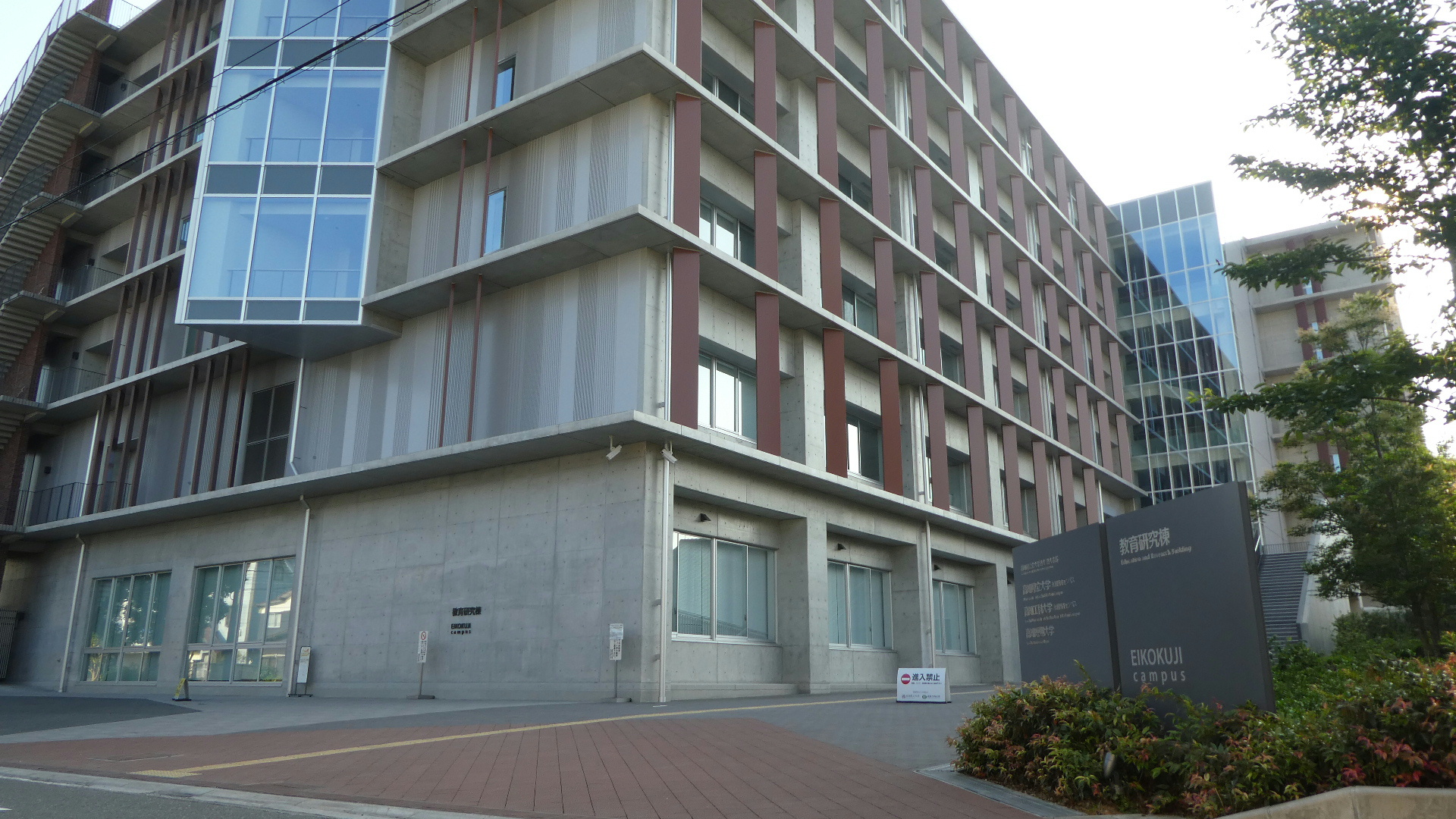
Kōchi Prefectural University

=== Universities ===
Kōchi is home to two universities, Kōchi University (national) and University of Kochi (prefectural), and four junior colleges including Kochi Junior College.

National university

- Kōchi University

Public university

- University of Kochi（Kōchi Prefectural University）

Private university

- Kochi Gakuen University
- The Open University of Japan
- University of Kochi Health Sciences

=== Schools ===
Elementary and secondary education

Kōchi has 39 public elementary schools, 17 public middle schools and one public high school operated by the city government, one private and one national elementary school, and five private combined middle/high schools. The city has eight public high schools administered by the Kōchi Prefectural Department of Education. The prefecture also operates one middle school and one combined middle/high school.

== Transport ==
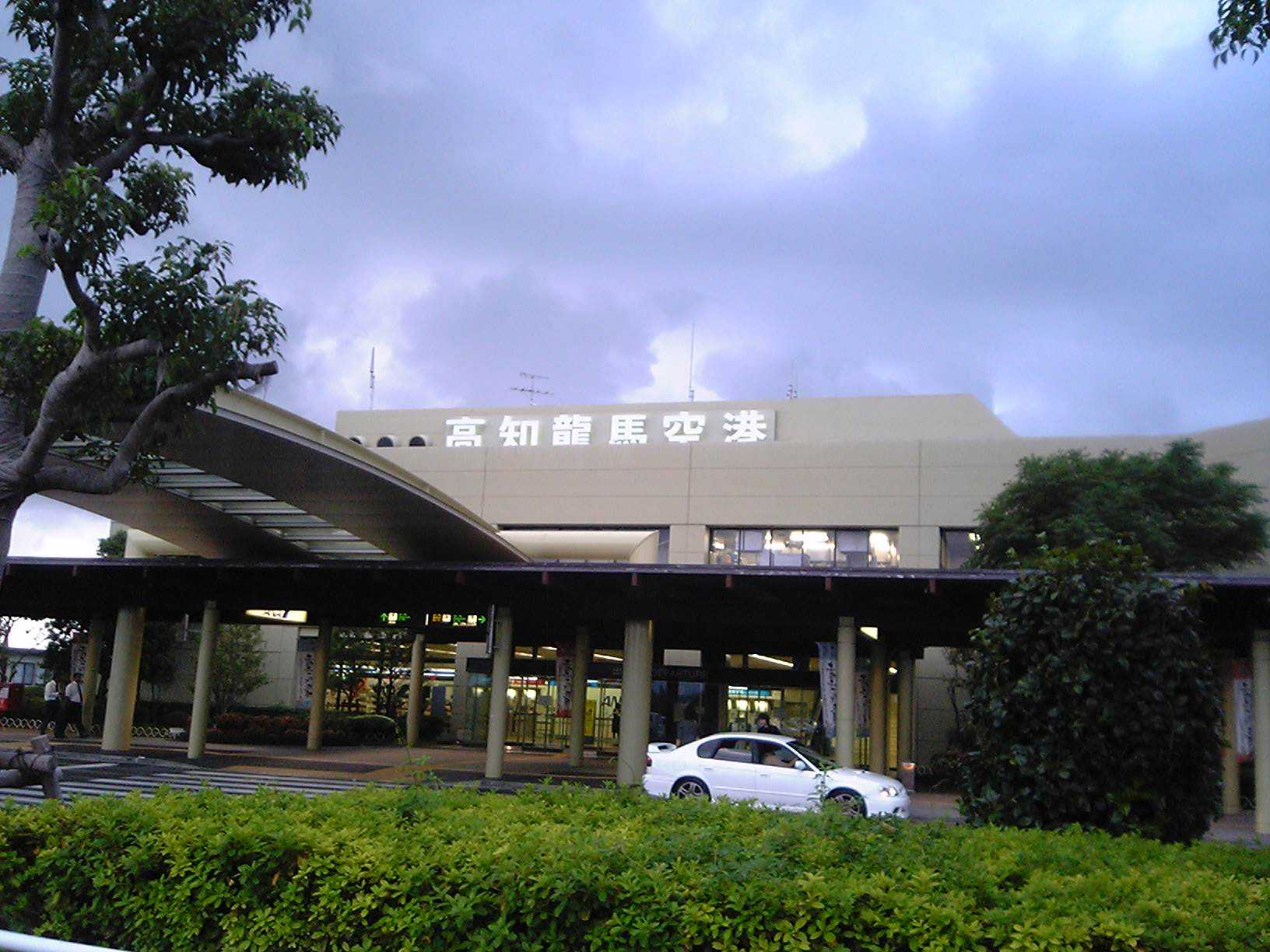
Kōchi Ryōma Airport

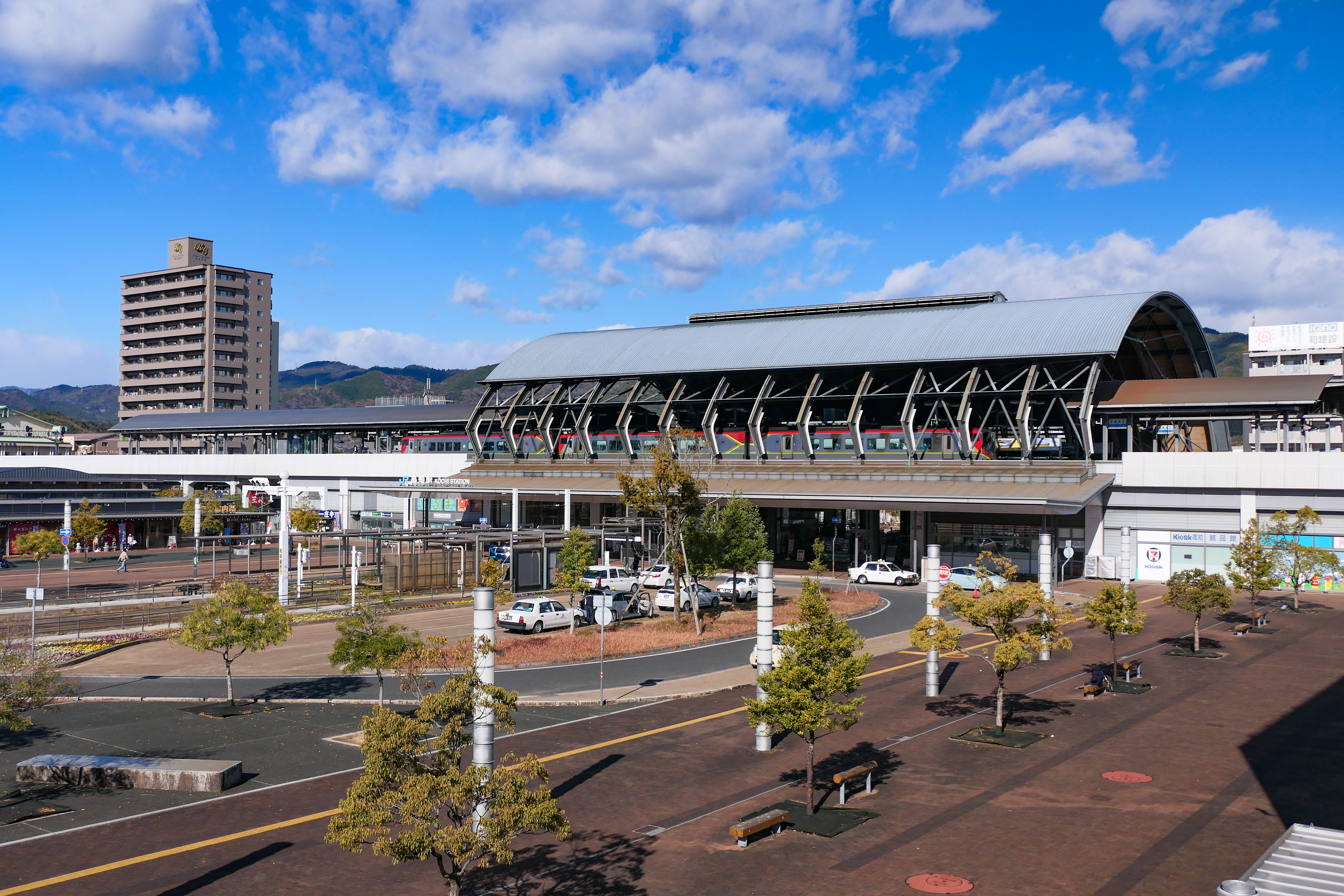
Kōchi Station

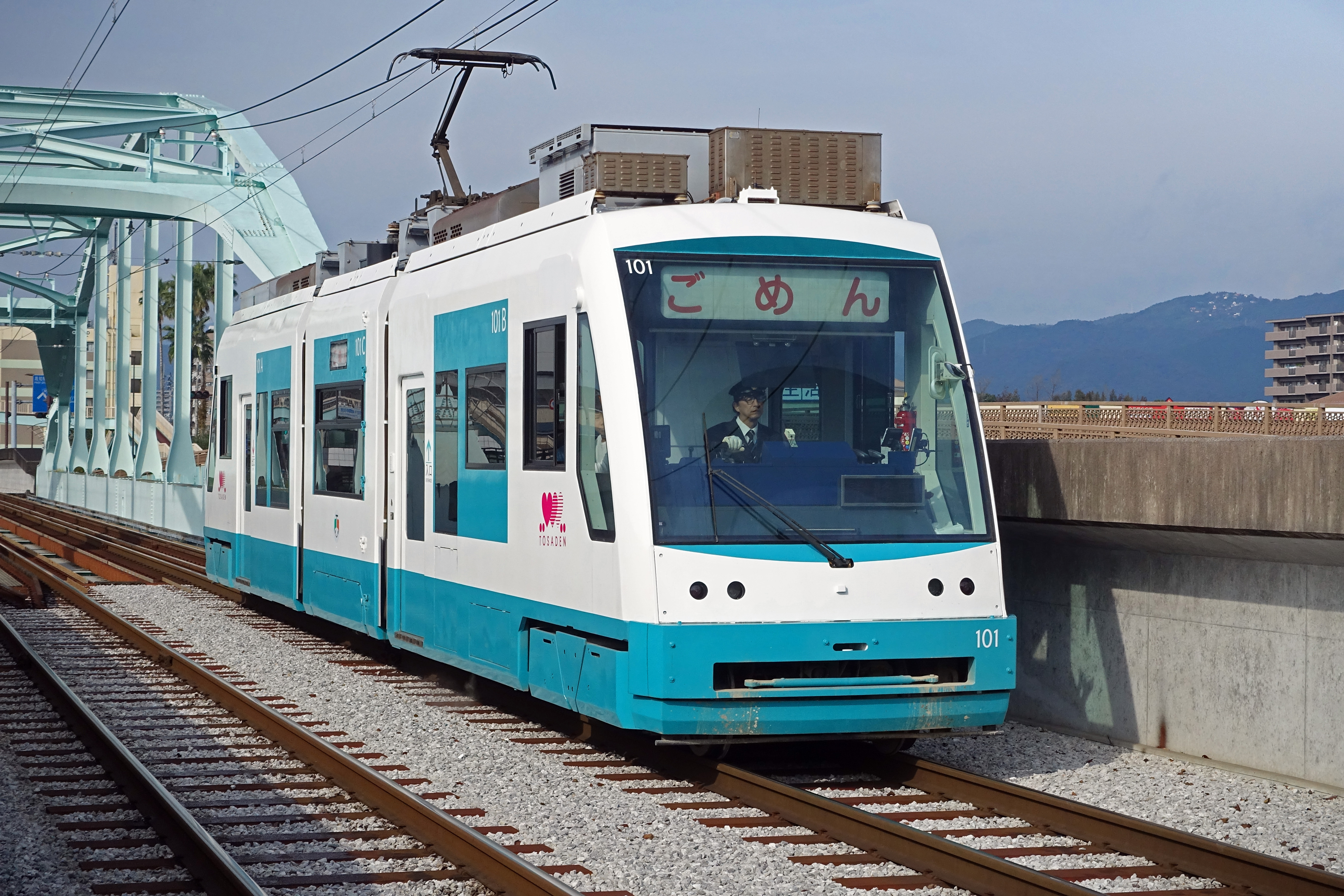
Tosaden Kōtsū

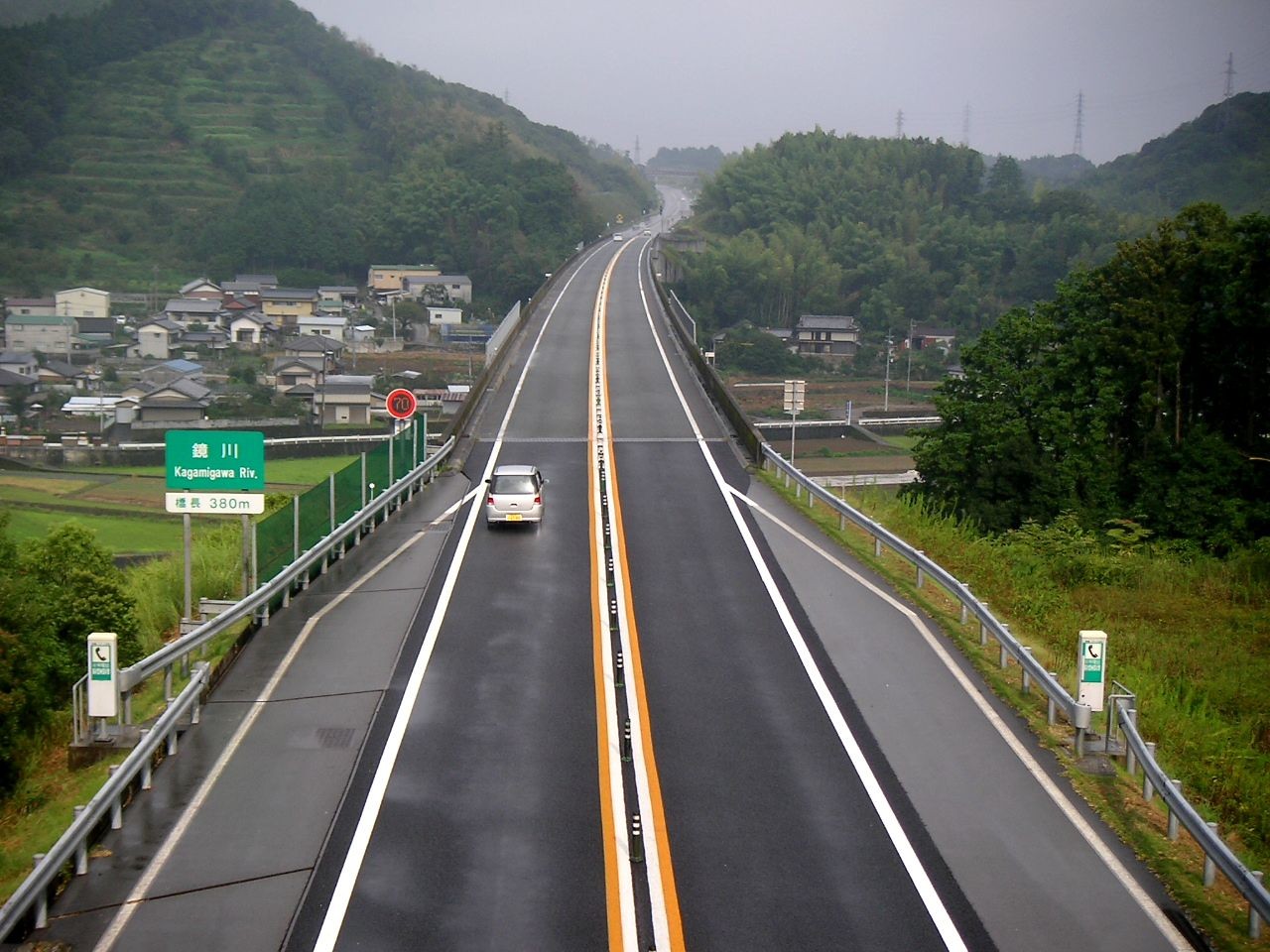
Kochi Expwy

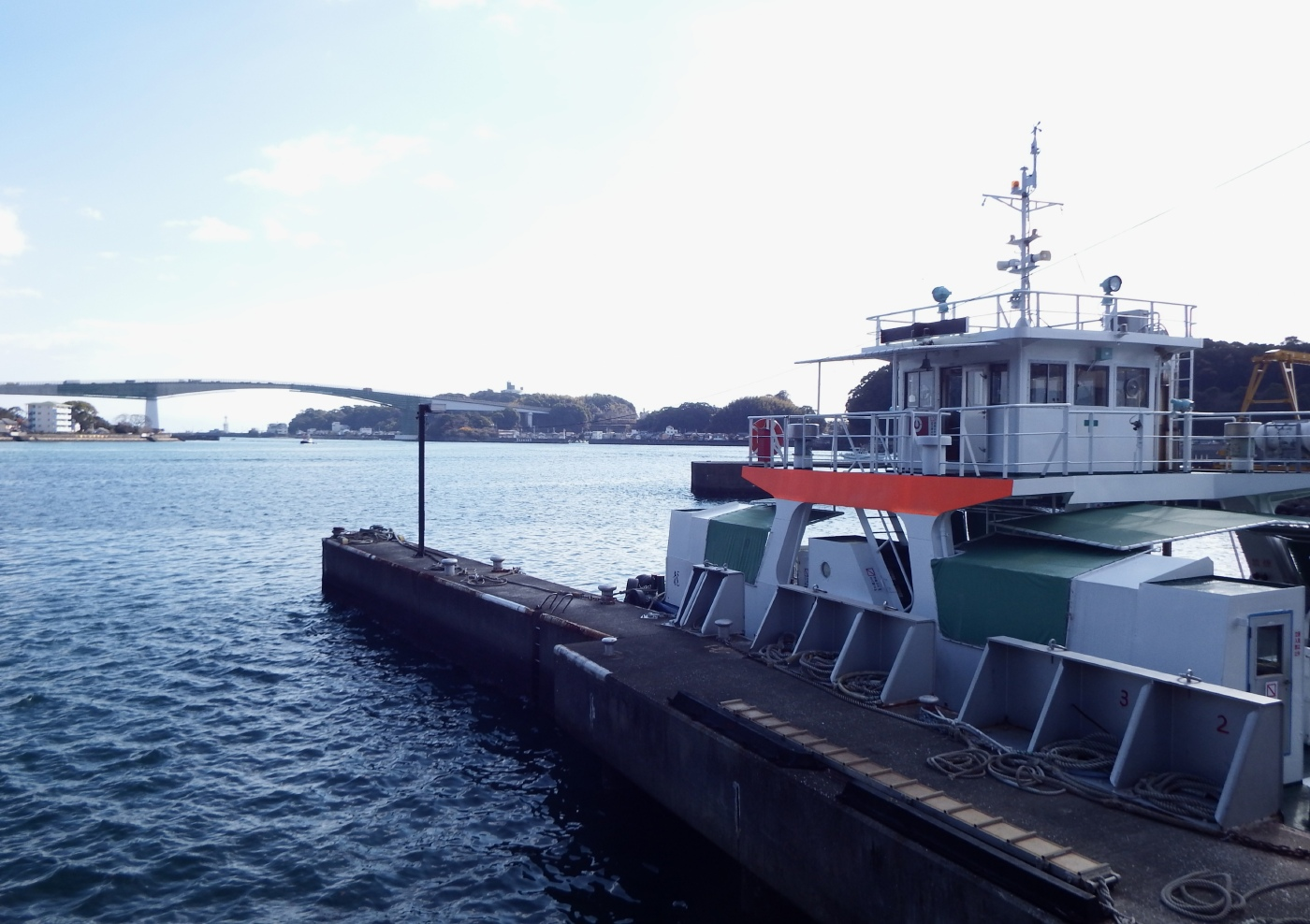
Port of Kochi

=== Airport ===
- Kōchi Ryōma Airport, located in nearby Nankoku

=== Railways ===
Kōchi is located on the JR Shikoku's Dosan Line connecting it to northern Shikoku, and via interchanges with the Tosa Kuroshio Railway to the eastern and western parts of Kōchi Prefecture. JR's central station in Kōchi is Kōchi Station.

==== Conventional lines ====
Shikoku Railway Company JR Shikoku ■Dosan Line

- Tosa-Ōtsu • Nunoshida • Tosa-Ikku • Azōno • Kōchi • Iriake • Engyōjiguchi • Asahi • Kōchi-Shōgyō-Mae • Asakura

=== Tramways ===
The most visible form of transport within Kōchi is the tram service run by Tosaden Kōtsū. Its three lines with historic cars service the major north–south and east–west axes of the city.

Tosaden Kōtsū

- ■Gomen Line
- ■Ino Line
- ■Sanbashi Line

=== Busways ===
The city also has an extensive bus network.

=== Highways ===
Kōchi is also serviced by the Kōchi interchange of the Kōchi Expressway which connects to the national expressway system.

==== Expressway ====
- Kōchi Expressway
- Kōchi-Tōbu Expressway

==== Japan National Route ====
- National Route 32
- National Route 33
- National Route 55
- National Route 56
- National Route 194
- National Route 195

=== Seaways ===
- Port of Kōchi

== Tourism ==
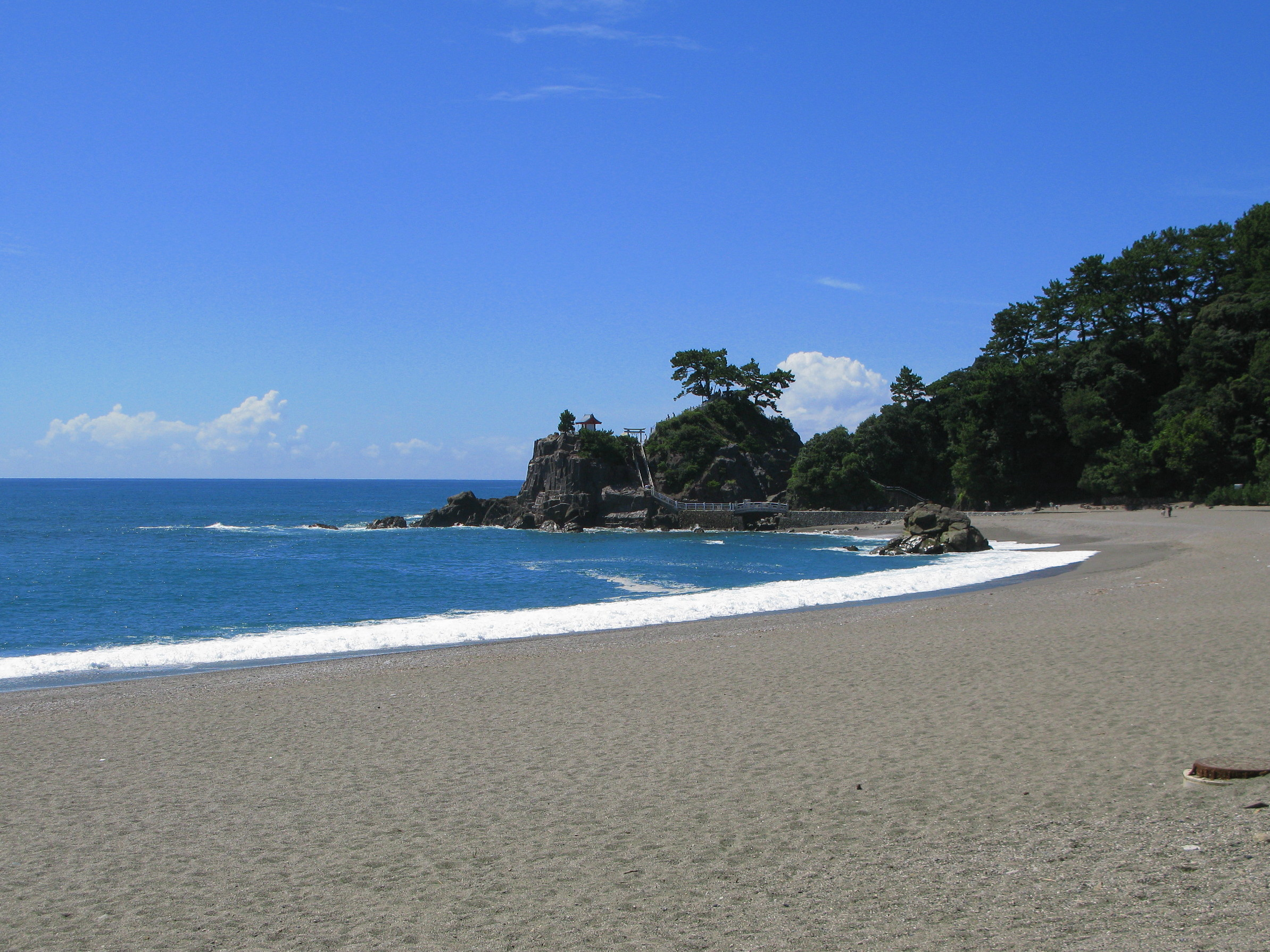
Katsurahama

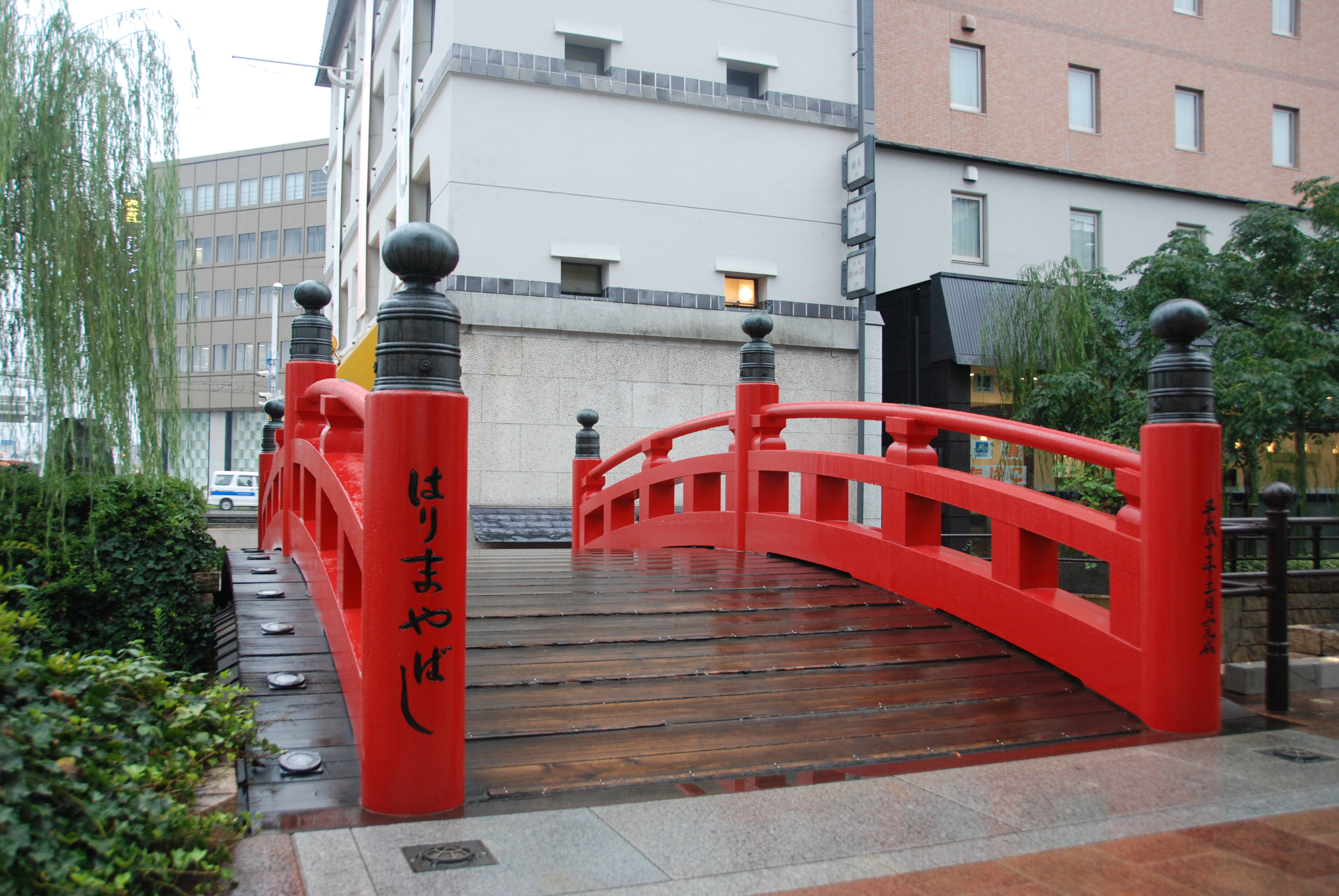
Harimaya-bashi

Kōchi Castle still exists in its pre-restoration form, and is one of the main tourist attractions. Other places of interest in the city centre are the Obiyamachi (帯屋町) shopping arcade, the regular Sunday street markets which are close to a kilometre in length, and Harimayabashi (はりまや橋), a bridge that featured in a famous Kōchi song about the forbidden love of a Buddhist priest.

=== Local attractions ===
The mountain Godaisan (五台山) holds a public park with views of the city, and is home to stop 31 on the Shikoku Pilgrimage, Chikurin-ji, as well as the Makino Botanical Garden.

Off Museum Road (Kenritsu Bijutsukandori) is The Museum of Art, Kōchi, where the main collection is composed of expressionistic works related to Kōchi.

The Former Yamauchi Residence and Tosa Yamauchi Family Treasury and Archives are also to be found in the city.

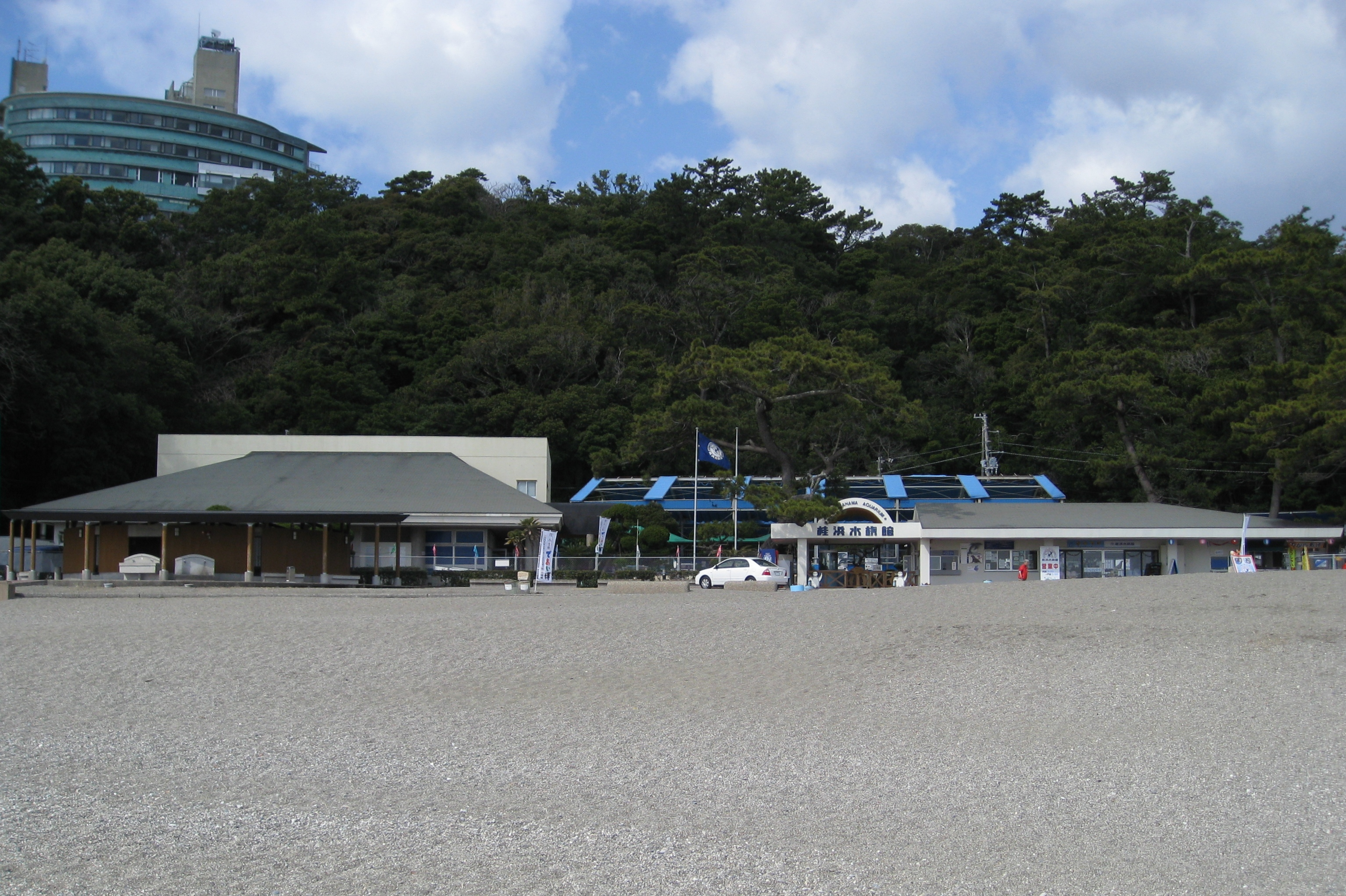
Katsurahama Aquarium

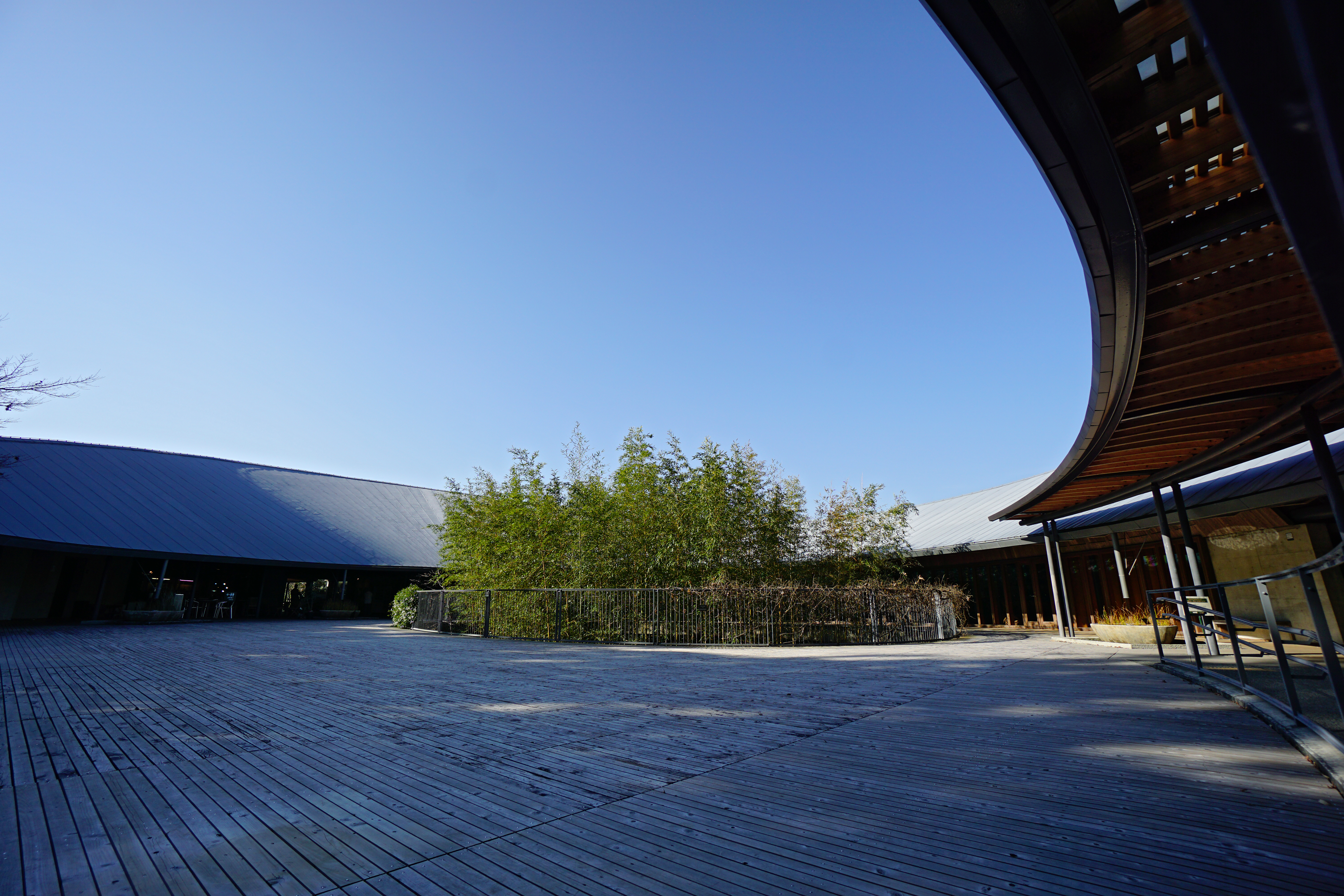
Makino Botanical Garden

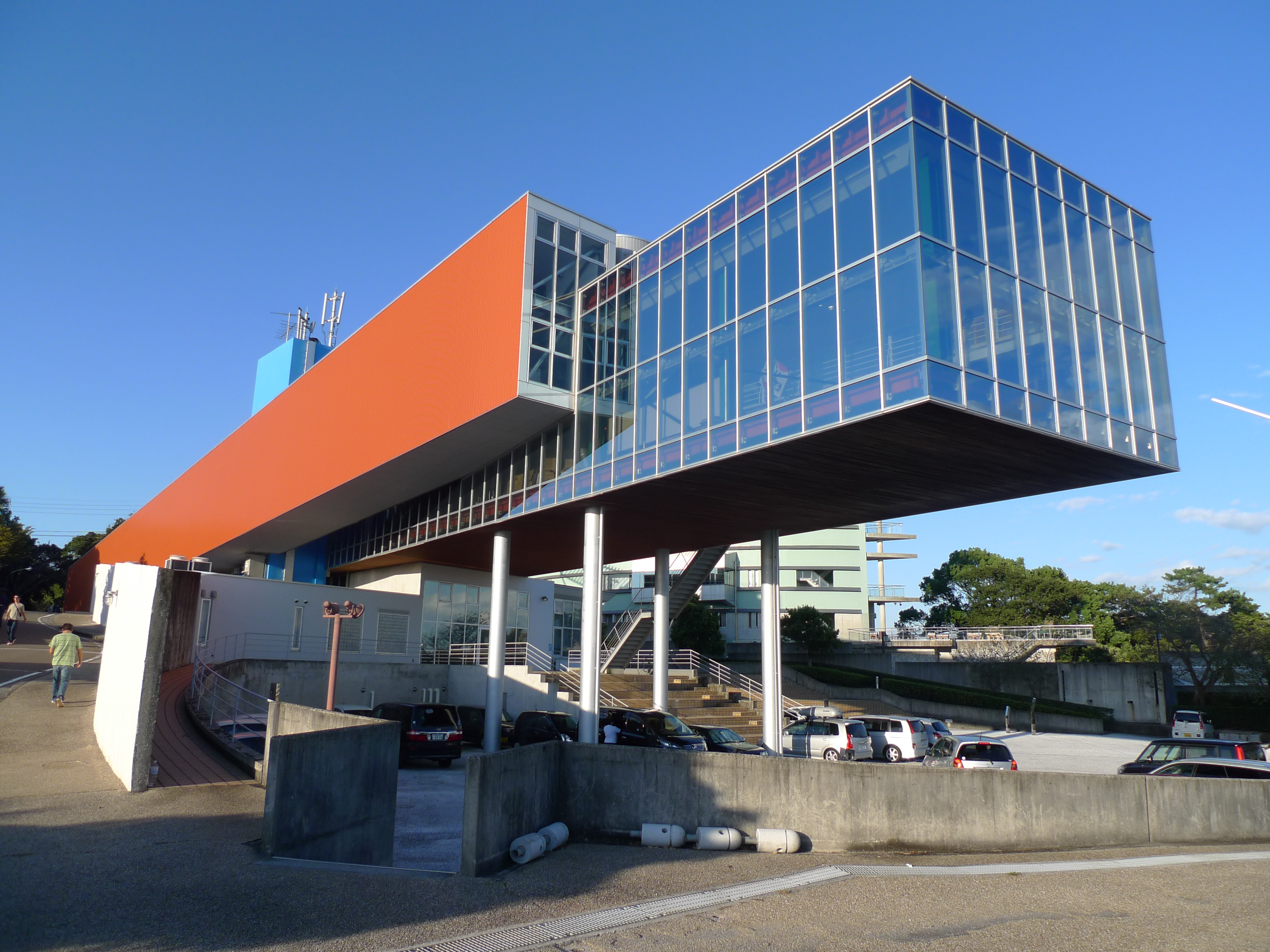
Sakamoto Ryōma Memorial Museum

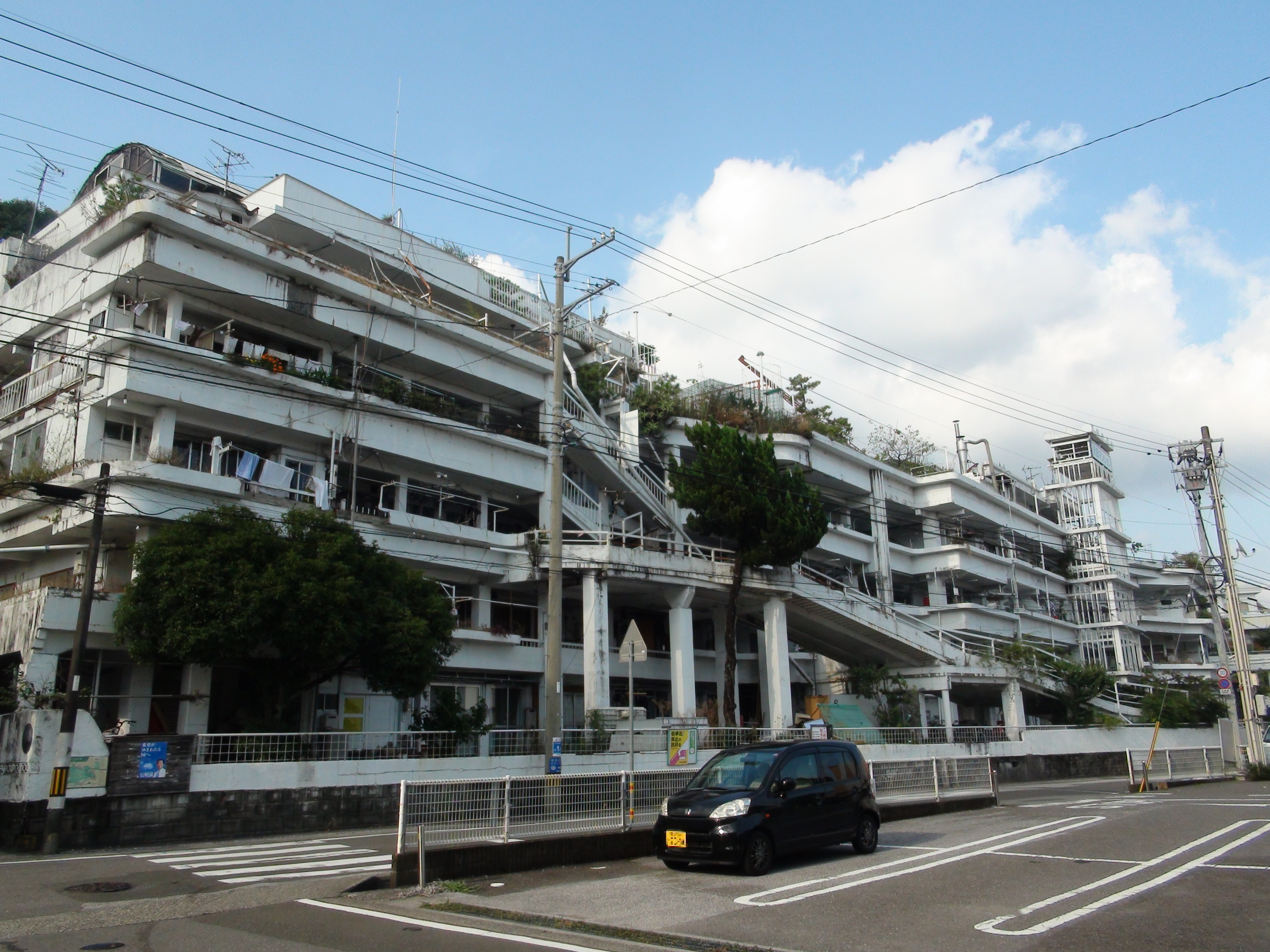
Sawada Mansion

=== Historic spots ===
Castle

- Kōchi Castle
- Urado Castle ruins

Shrine

The Shinto Shrine Tosa jinja is located to the west.

Temples

Temples No.30 (Zenrakuji, No.31(Chikurin-ji) and No.33 (Sekkei-ji) on the Shikoku Pilgrimage are located in the city.

At the mouth of Urado Bay, the remnants of Urado Castle (an earlier provincial seat) stand above Katsurahama, a famous beach with an aquarium and statue of the Kōchi hero Sakamoto Ryōma.

Nearby on the grounds is the Sakamoto Ryōma Memorial Museum.

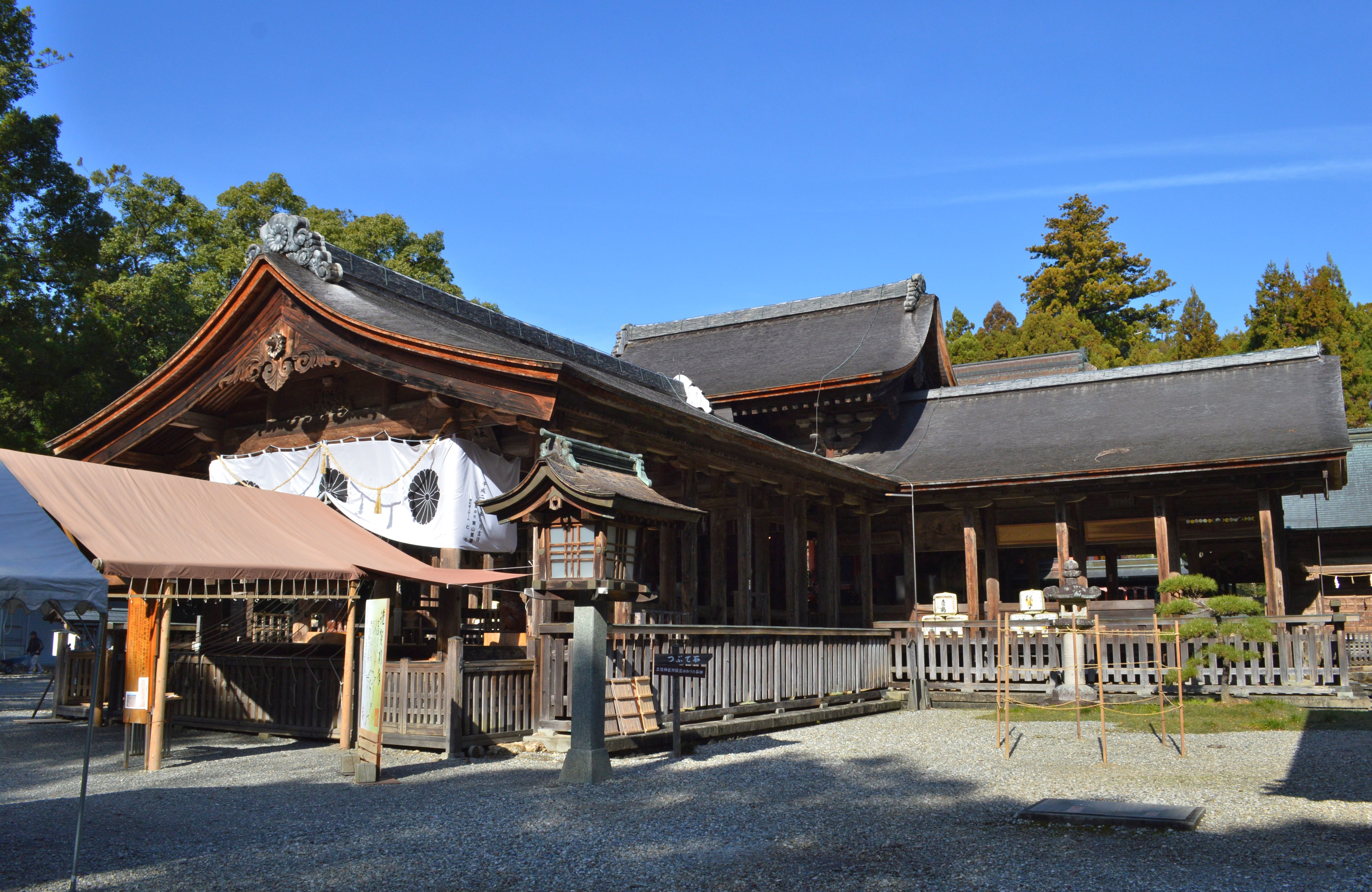
Tosa jinja

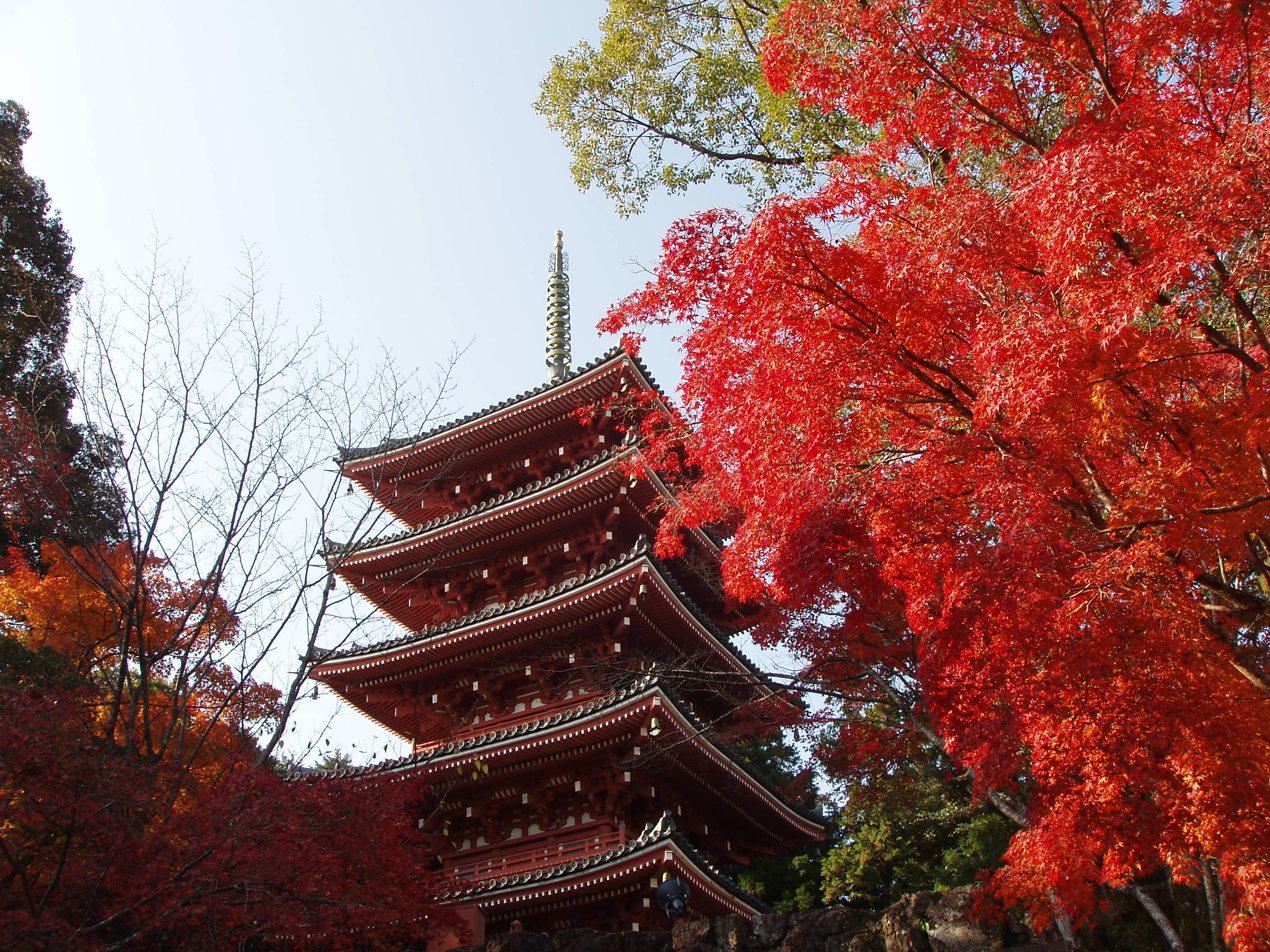
Chikurin-ji

== Culture ==
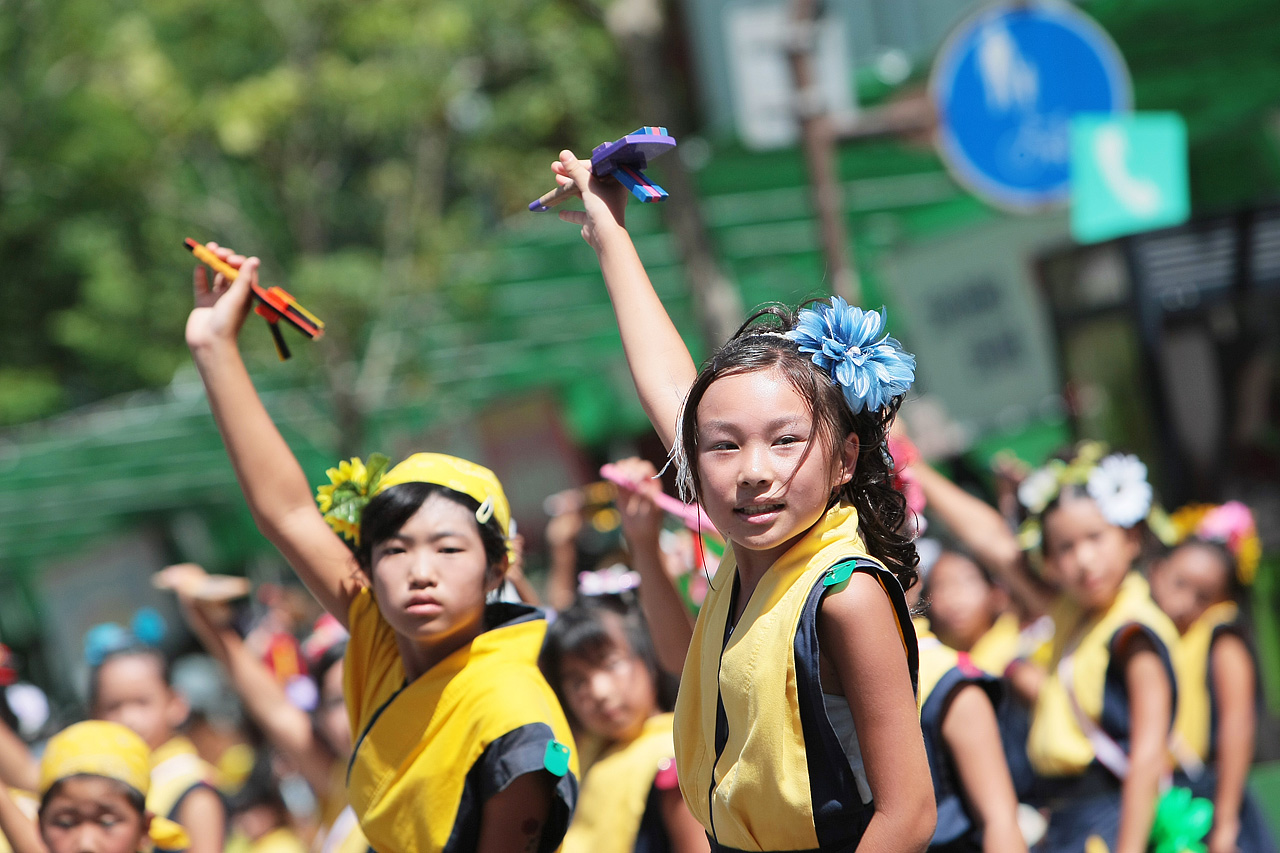
Yosakoi

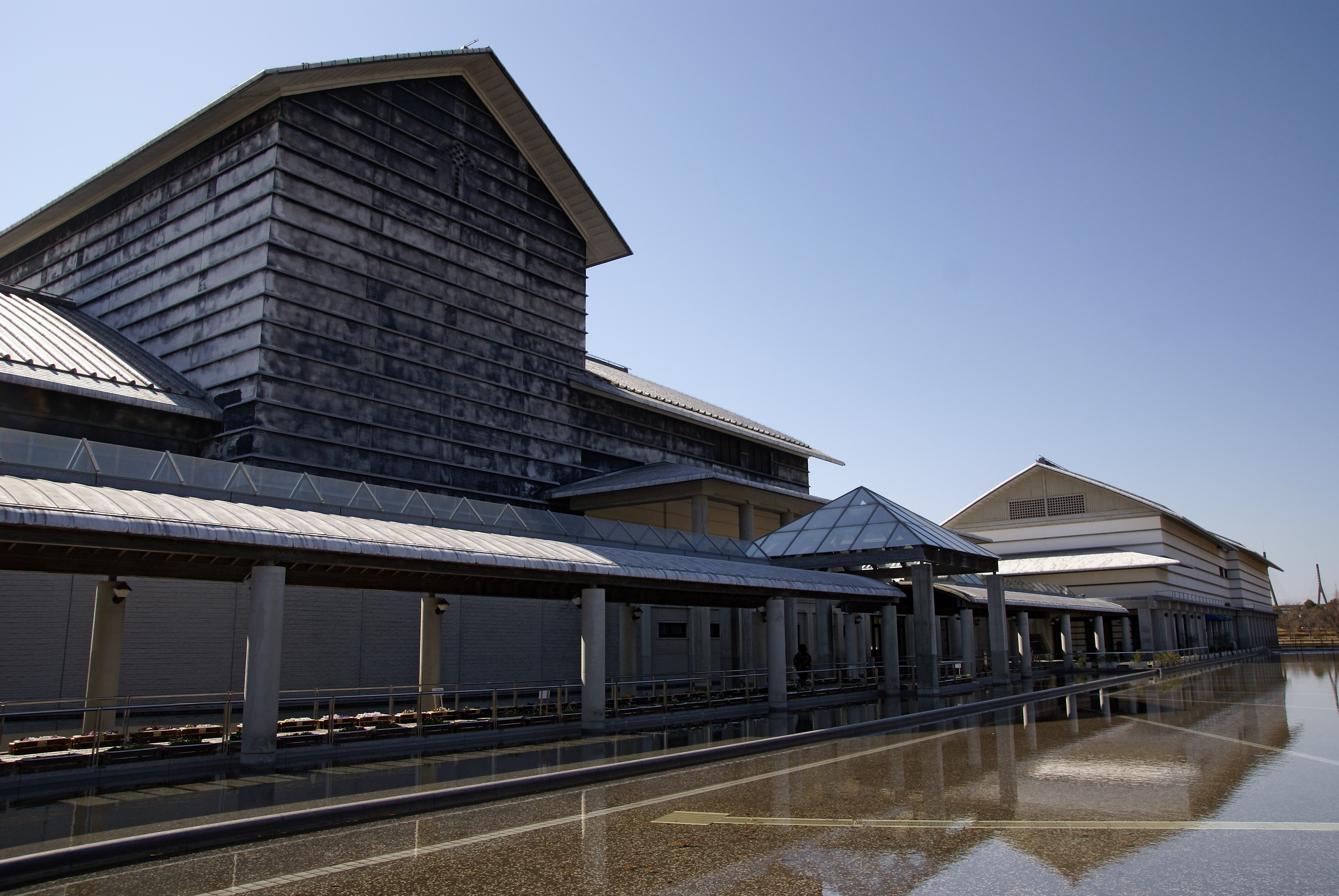
The Museum of Art, Kōchi

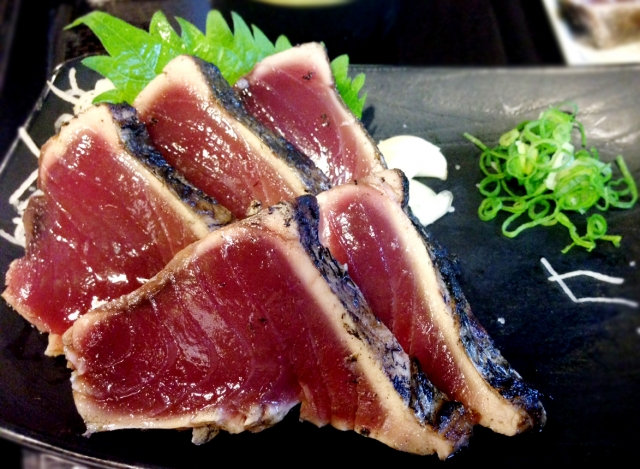
Katsuo-no-tataki

=== Festival・Events ===
Festival

Kōchi's most famous festival is the Yosakoi which is held in August. Teams of dancers dance to traditional and modern songs at various places around Kōchi. The total number of dancers is in the thousands.

- Yosakoi

Events

- Sunday street markets

=== Gourmet ===
- Katsuo-no-tataki
- Katsuobushi
- Sawachi Sushi
- Tosa-maki

=== Museums ===
- Kōchi Castle Museum of History
- Kōchi Literary Museum
- Ryōma's Birthplace Memorial Museum
- Sakamoto Ryōma Memorial Museum
- The Museum of Art, Kōchi

=== Sports ===
Club	Sport	League	Venue	Established
Kōchi Fighting Dogs	Baseball	Shikoku Island League Plus	Kochi Municipal Baseball Park, Kochi Prefectural Haruno Baseball Stadium	2005
Kochi United SC	Soccer	J3 League	Kochi Haruno Athletic Stadium	2016

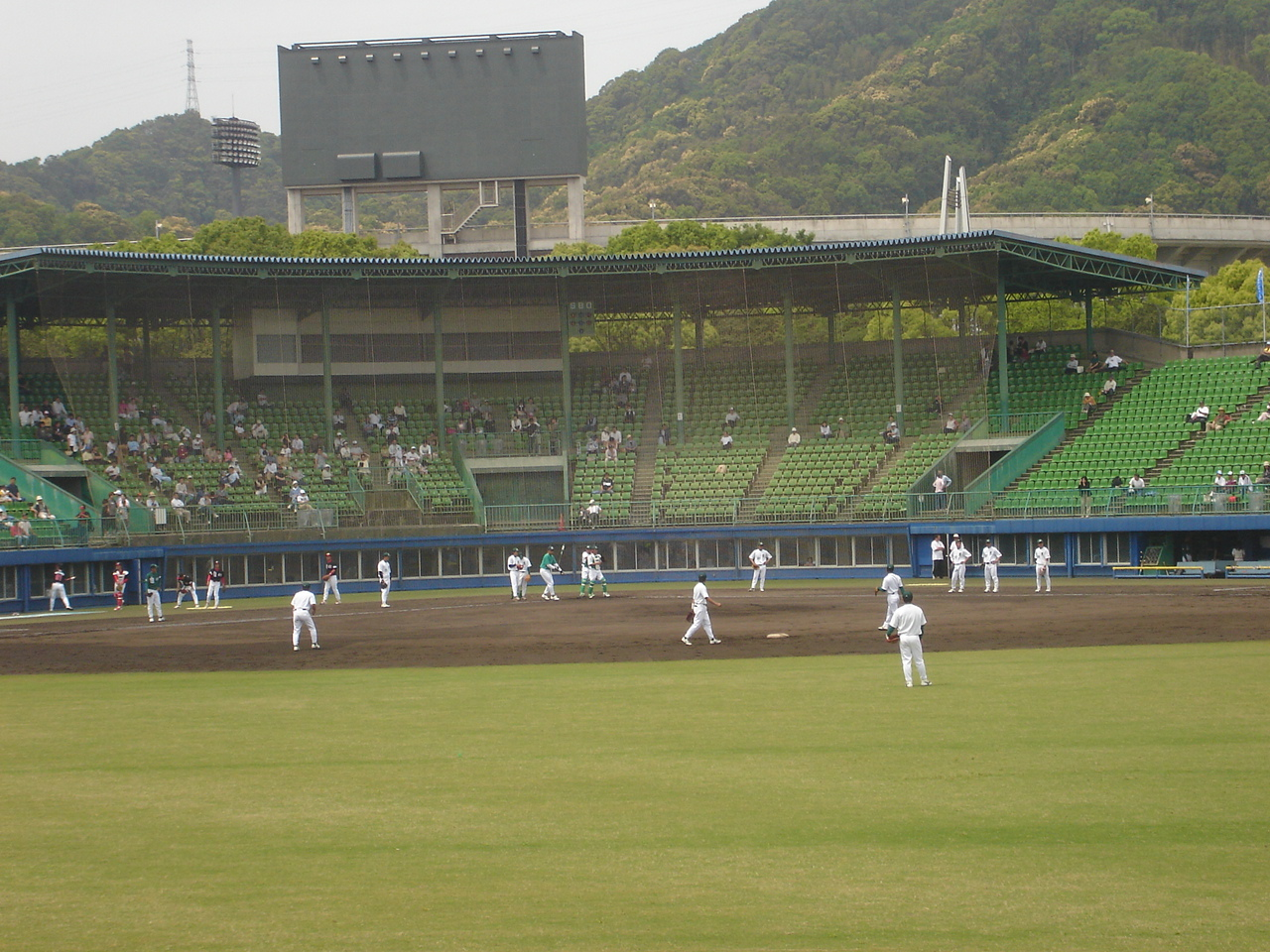
Kōchi Fighting Dogs
（Kochi Prefectural Haruno Baseball Stadium）

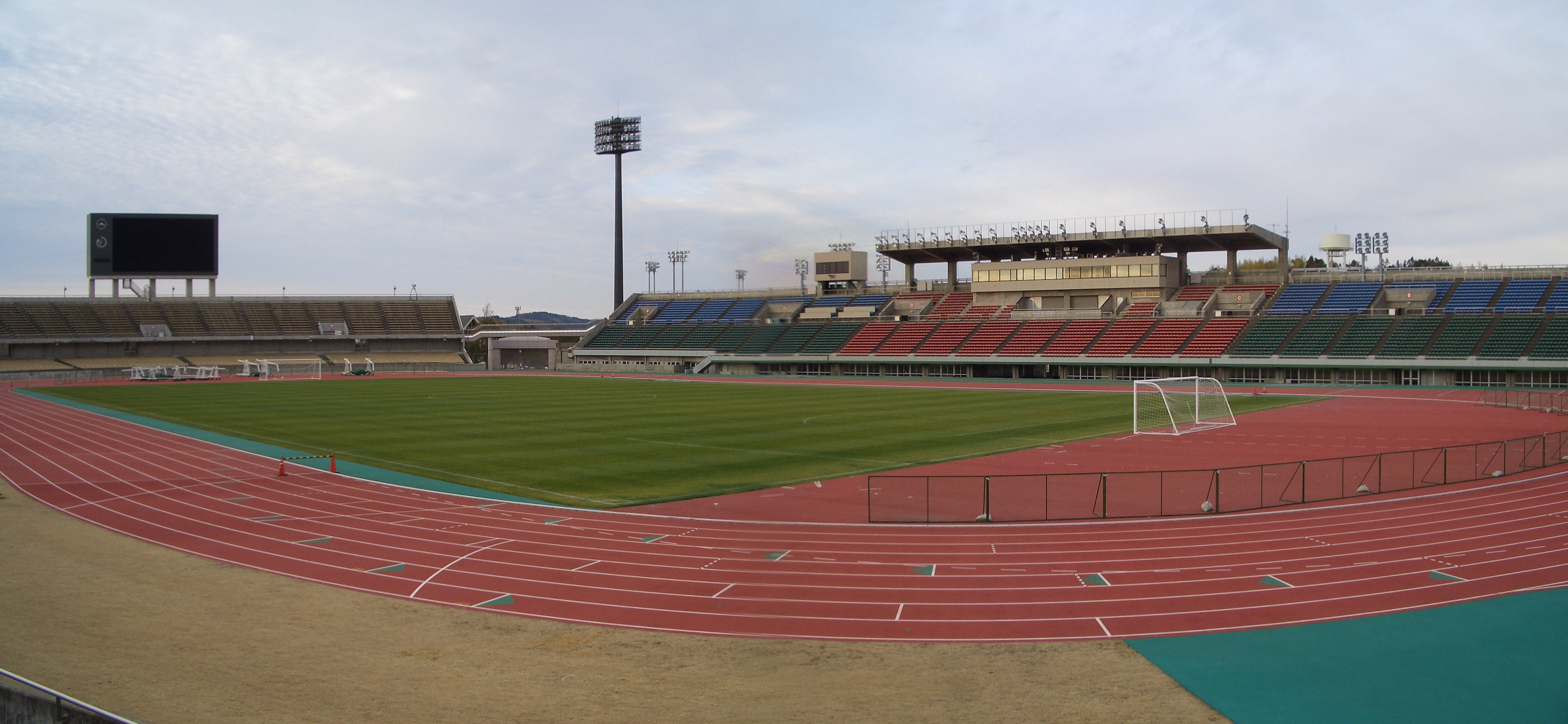
Kochi United SC
（Kochi Haruno Athletic Stadium）

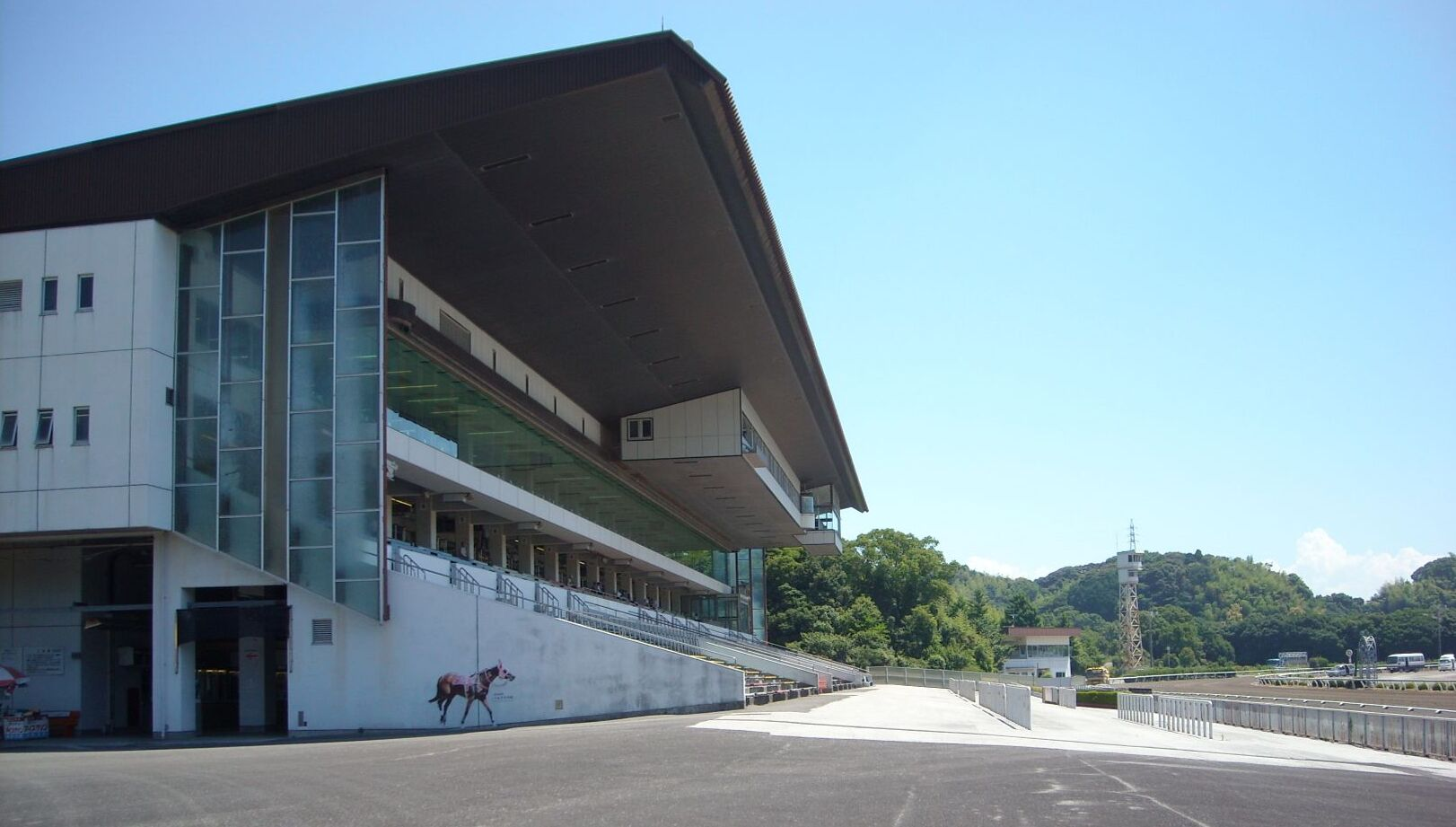
Kochi Racecourse
Horse racing

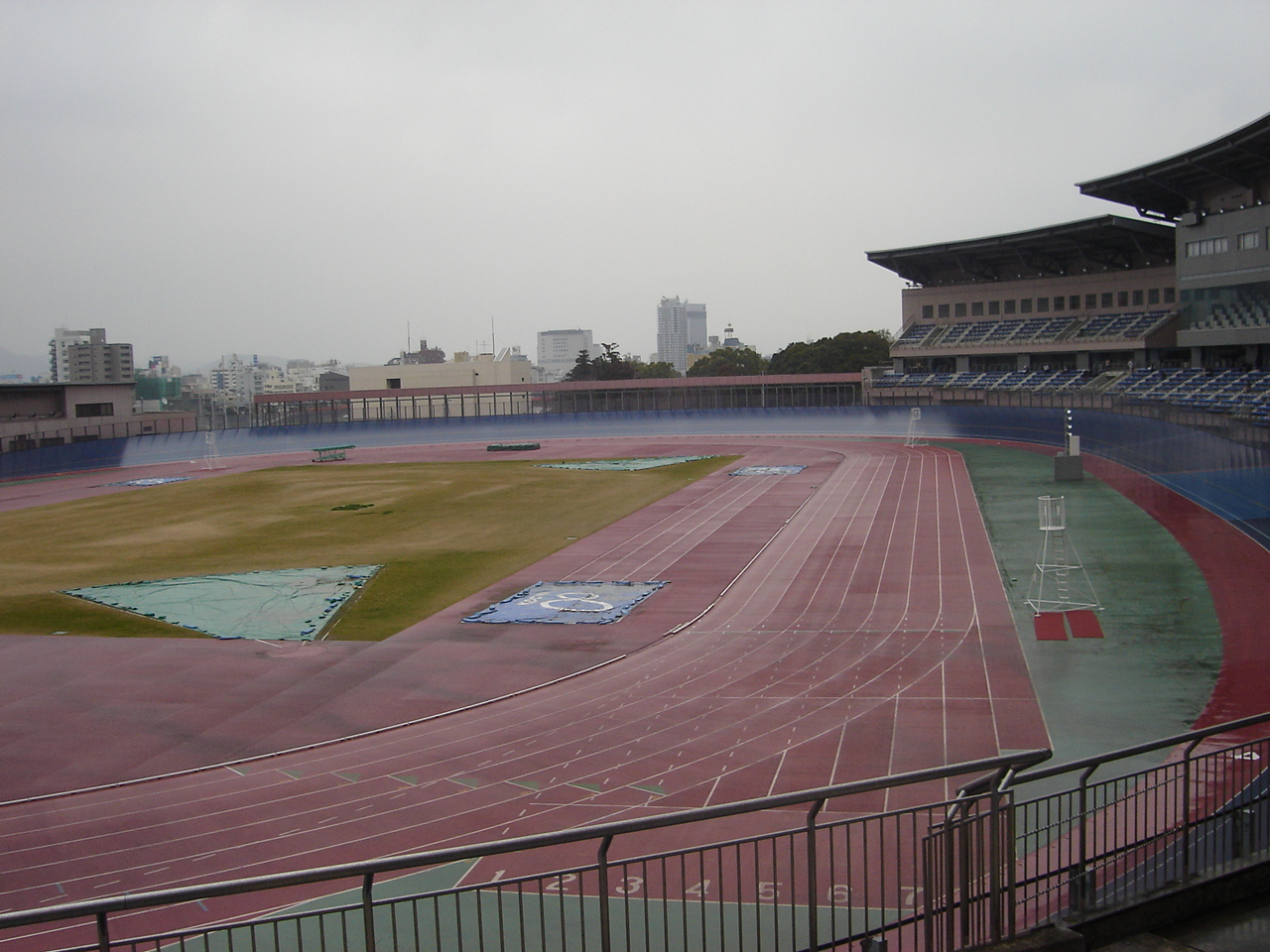
Kōchi Velodrome（Ryoma Stadium）
Keirin

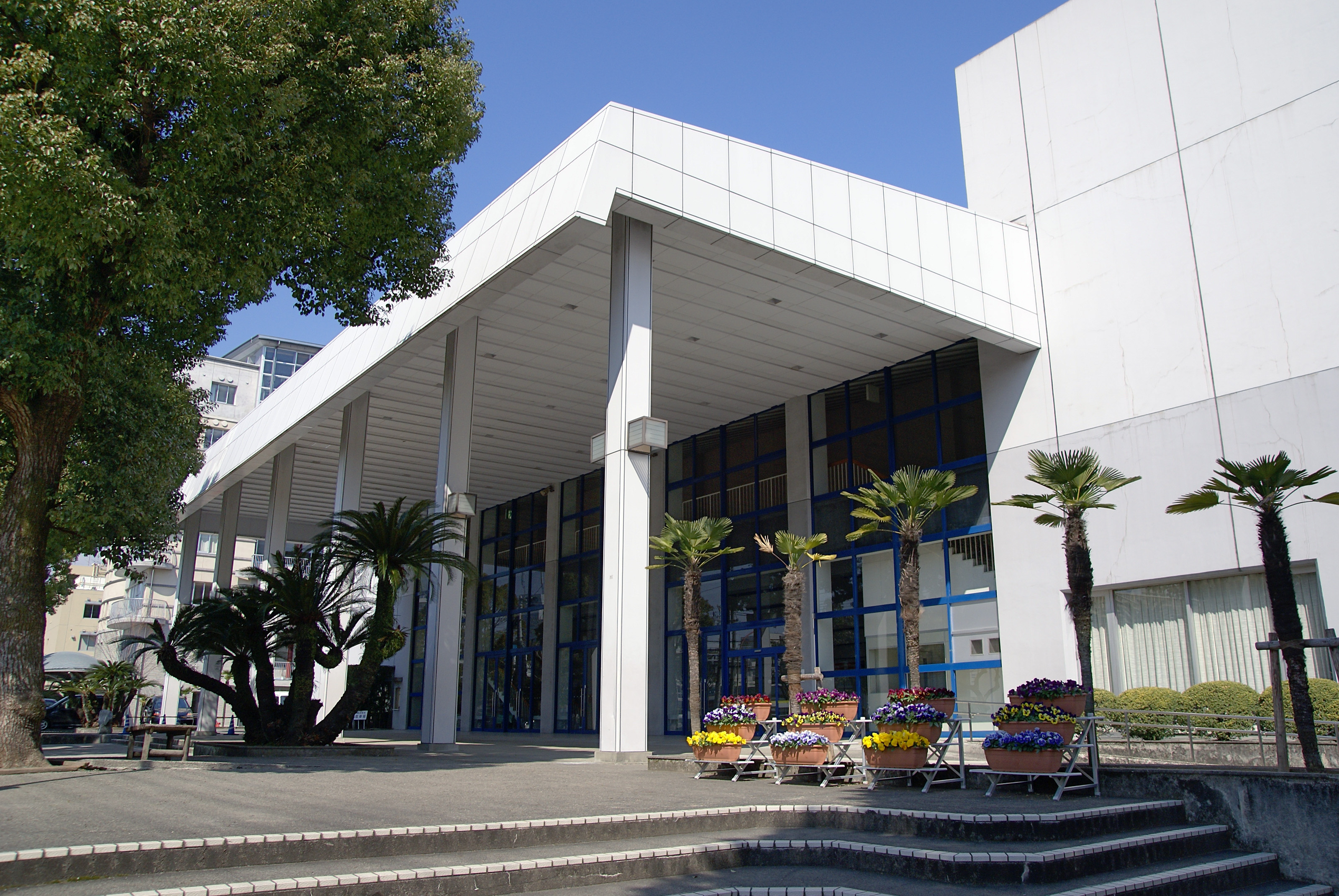
Kochi Prefectural Gymnasium

== Notable figures from Kōchi ==
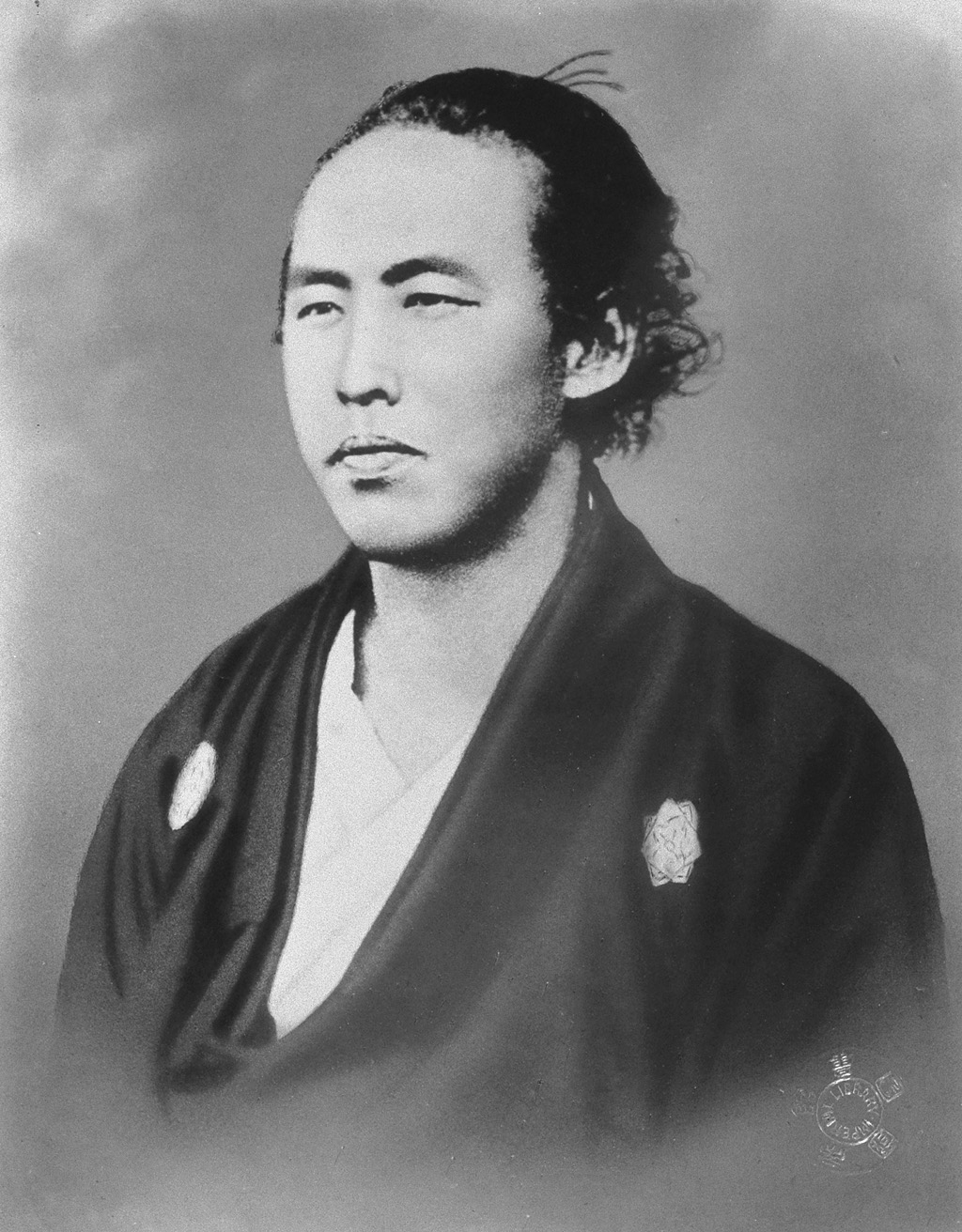
Sakamoto Ryōma

- Ryōko Hirosue (born 1980), actress and singer
- Okada Izō (1832–1865), samurai
- Kusunose Kita (1836–1920), advocate for women's rights
- Akihiro Kitamura (born 1979), actor and director
- Tomitaro Makino (1862–1957), botanist
- Nakahama Manjirō (1827–1898), samurai and translator
- Hideshi Matsuda (born 1954), car racer and TV reporter
- Tetsuya Nomura (born 1970), video game designer
- Fumio Nutahara (born 1963), rally driver
- Toshiko Okanoue (born 1928), avant-garde artist
- Sakamoto Ryōma (1836–1867), samurai and politician
- Tsutomu Seki (born 1930), astronomer
- Sumi Shimamoto (born 1954), voice actress
- Itagaki Taisuke (1837–1919), politician
- Baba Tatsui (1850–1888), legislative reformer
- Noa Tsurushima (born 2001), actress and model
- Nobuo Uematsu (born 1959), composer and keyboardist
- Haru Urara (1996-2025), Racehorse
- Hideki Kawakami (1971-2007), Musician
