= Tosayama, Kōchi =

Dissolved municipality in Tosa district, Kōchi prefecture, Japan

Tosayama (土佐山村, Tosayama-mura) was a village located in Tosa District, Kōchi Prefecture, Japan.

As of 2003, the village had an estimated population of 1,251 and a density of 21.12 persons per km^{2}. The total area was 59.22 km^{2}.

On January 1, 2005, Tosayama, along with the village of Kagami (also from Tosa District), was merged into the expanded city of Kōchi, and thus no longer exists as an independent municipality.
