= Kagami, Kōchi (Tosa) =

Dissolved municipality in Kōchi prefecture, Japan

Kagami (鏡村, Kagami-mura) was a village located in Tosa District, Kōchi Prefecture, Japan.

As of 2003, the village had an estimated population of 1,582 and a density of 26.34 persons per km^{2}. The total area was 60.06 km^{2}.

On January 1, 2005, Kagami, along with the village of Tosayama (also from Tosa District), was merged into the expanded city of Kōchi, and thus no longer exists as an independent municipality.
