= Itchōme =

Itchōme may refer to various train stations in Japan:

- Aoyama-itchōme Station
- Asahimachi-itchōme Station
- Chiyorichō-itchōme Station
- Ginza-itchōme Station
- Kamimachi-itchōme Station
- Nagamachi-Itchōme Station
- Roppongi-itchōme Station
- Sanbashi-dōri-itchōme Station
