= Inoshō-mae Station =

Tram station in Ino, Kōchi Prefecture, Japan

Coordinates: 33°33′01″N 133°26′39″E

Inoshō-mae Station (伊野商業前駅, Inoshō-mae-eki) is a tram station in Ino, Agawa District, Kōchi Prefecture, Japan.

== Lines ==
- Tosa Electric Railway
  - Ino Line

== Adjacent stations ==
«	Service	»
Tosa Electric Railway
Ino Line
Edagawa	-	Kitauchi
