= Kōchijō-mae Station =

Tram station in Kōchi, Kōchi Prefecture, Japan

Coordinates: 33°33′30″N 133°32′03″E

Kōchijō-mae Station 高知城前停留場
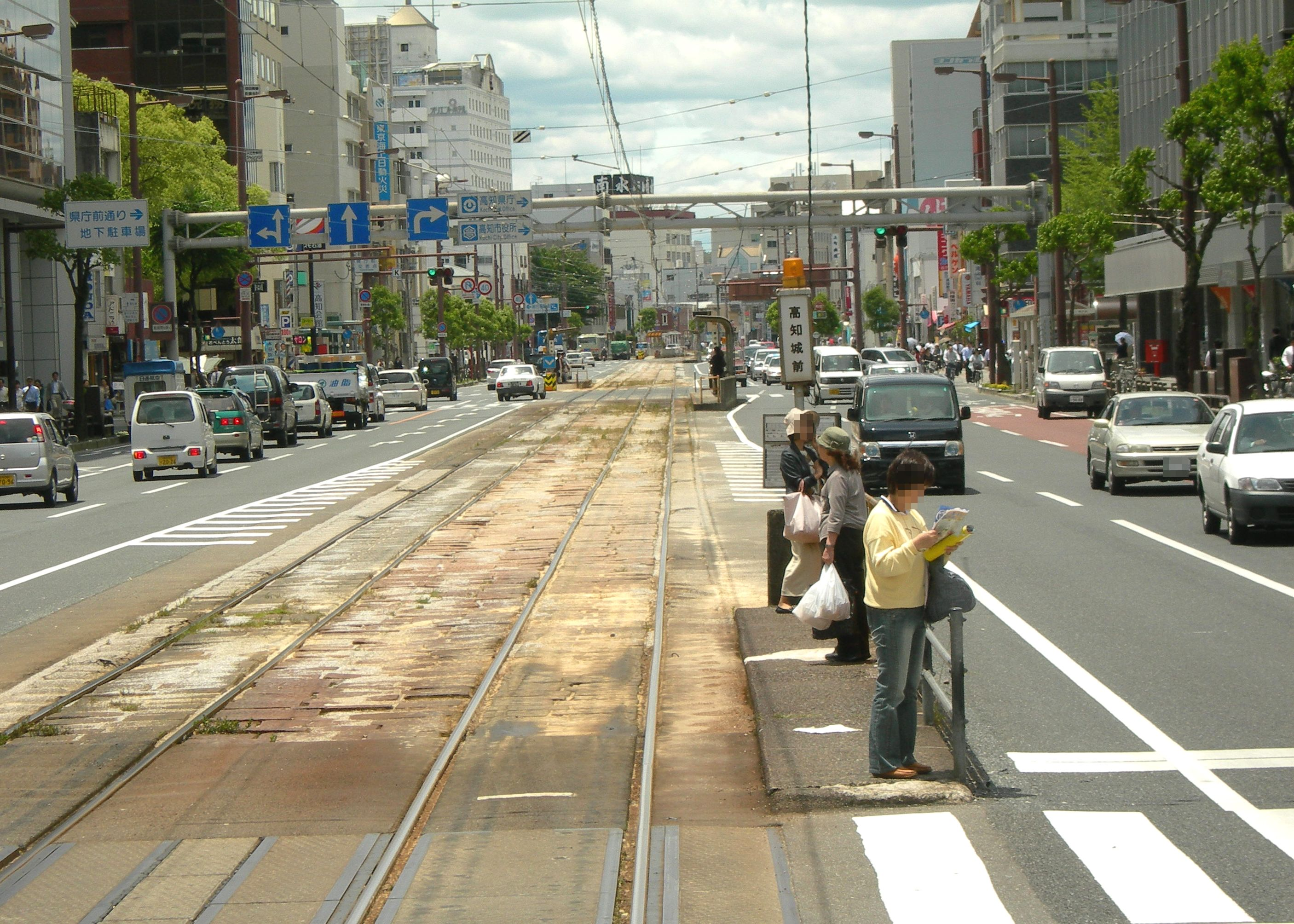
- Kōchijō-mae Station

General information
- Location: Kōchi; Japan
- Operator: Tosaden Kōtsū
- Line: Ino Line

History
- Opened: May 2, 1904
Location

Kōchijō-mae Station (高知城前停留場, Kōchijō-mae-teiryujō) is a tram station in Kōchi, Kōchi Prefecture, Japan. It is operated by Tosaden Kōtsū.

== History ==
The station first opened in 1904 as Keisatsu-mae Station (警察前停留場). In 1950, it was again renamed to Kōen-tōri Station. Because many passengers looking to visit Kōchi Castle would disembark at the adjacent Kenchō-mae Station instead, Kōen-tōri Station was renamed to Kōchijō-mae Station (lit. 'In front of Kōchi Castle') in 1978 to better guide passengers.

== Lines ==
- Tosa Electric Railway
  - Ino Line

== Adjacent stations ==
«	Service	»
Tosa Electric Railway
Ino Line
Ōhashidōri	-	Kenchō-mae

== Surrounding area ==
- Kōchi Castle
- Kōchi Literary Museum
- Kōchi Castle Museum of History
- Kochi Broadcasting Headquarters
- Japan National Route 32
