= Edagawa Station =

Railway and tram station in Ino, Kōchi Prefecture, Japan

Edagawa Station 枝川駅
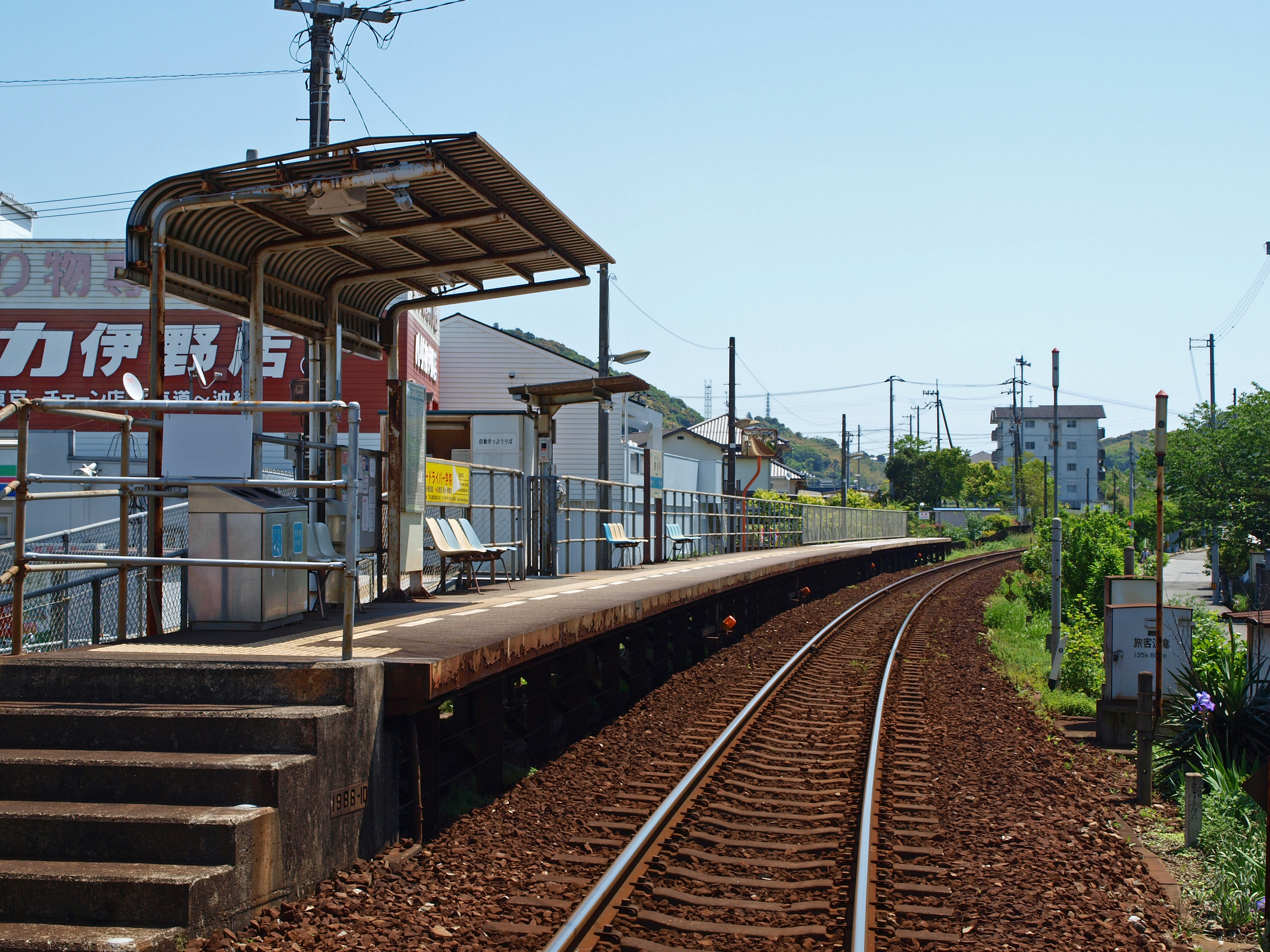
- Edagawa Station in May 2010

General information
- Location: Edagawa, Ino, Agawa-gun, Kōchi-ken 781-2120; Japan
- Coordinates: 33°33′02″N 133°26′55″E
- Operator: JR Shikoku
- Line: ■ Dosan Line
- Distance: 136.2 km from Tadotsu
- Platforms: 1 side platform
- Tracks: 1
- Connections: Tosaden Kōtsū tramstop

Other information
- Status: Unattended
- Station code: K06

History
- Opened: 1 November 1986

Passengers
- FY2019: 700
Location
- Location within Kochi Prefecture Location within Japan

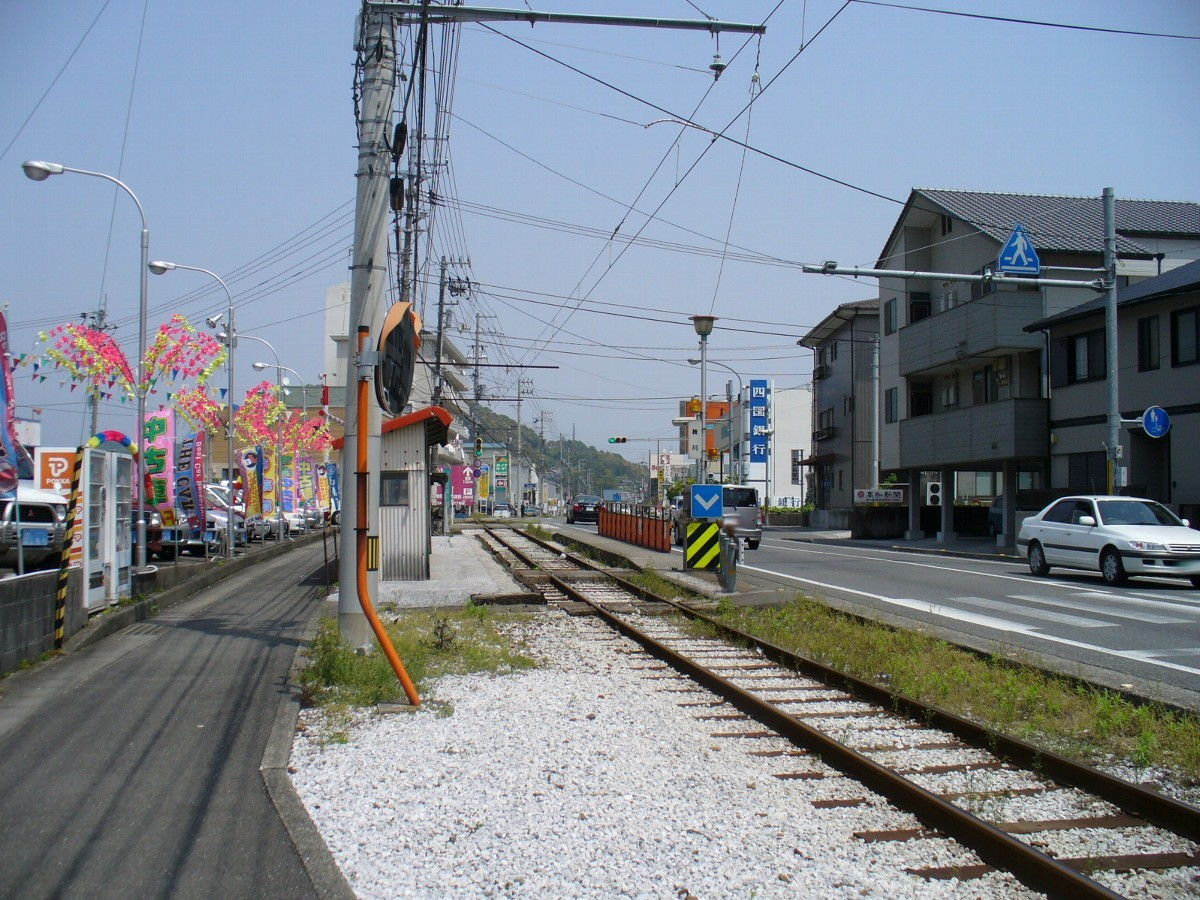
Station of Tosa Electric Railway

Edagawa Station (枝川駅, Edagawa-eki) is a passenger railway station located in the town of Ino, Agawa District, Kōchi Prefecture, Japan. It is operated by JR Shikoku and has the station number "K06".

== Lines ==
The station is served by JR Shikoku's Dosan Line and is located 136.2 km from the beginning of the line at Tadotsu. It is also across a street from the Tosa Electric Railway Ino Line tram stop, which is 9.2 kilometers from the terminus of that line at Harimayabashi in Kōchi.

== Layout ==
The JR station consists of a side platform serving a single bidirectional track. There is no station building, but only a shelter on the platform.

== Adjacent stations ==
«	Service	»
JR Shikoku
Dosan Line
Asakura	-	Ino
Tosa Electric Railway
Ino Line
Nakayama	-	Inoshō-mae

== History ==
The station opened on 1 November 1986 as a provisional stop. With the privatization of JNR on 1 April 1987, control of the station passed to JR Shikoku and Edagawa was elevated in status to a full station.

== Surrounding area ==
- Kochi Prefectural Ino Commercial High School

== See also ==
- List of railway stations in Japan
