= Kamimachi-gochōme Station =

Tram station in Kōchi, Kōchi Prefecture, Japan

Coordinates: 33°33′26″N 133°31′02″E

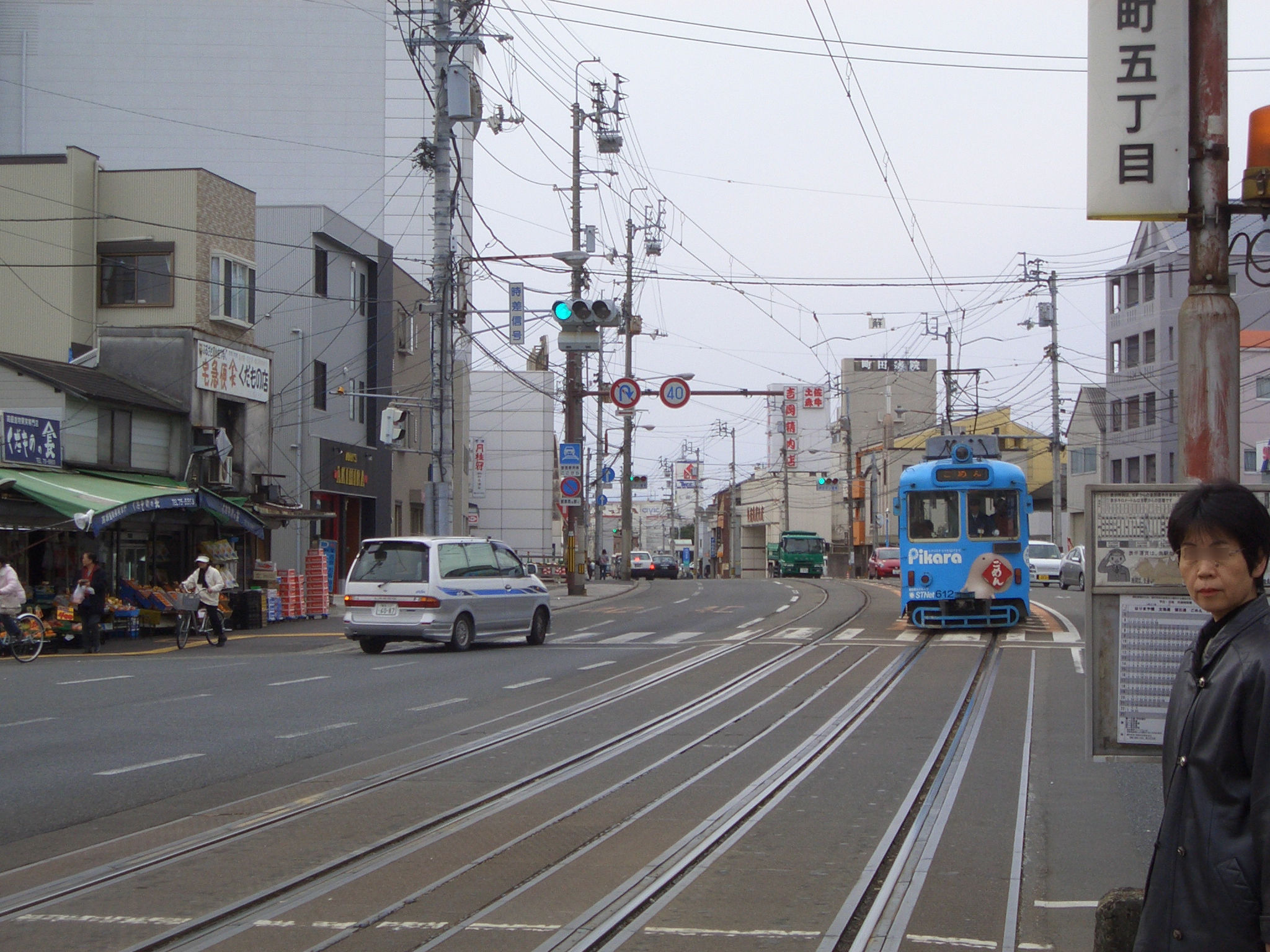
Kamimachi-gochōme Station

Kamimachi-gochōme Station (上町五丁目駅, Kamimachi-gochōme-eki) is a tram station in Kōchi, Kōchi Prefecture, Japan.

== Lines ==
- Tosa Electric Railway
  - Ino Line

== Adjacent stations ==
| « | Service | » |
Tosa Electric Railway
Ino Line
| Kamimachi-yonchōme | - | Asahimachi-itchōme |
