= Narutani Station =

Tram station in Ino, Kōchi Prefecture, Japan

Coordinates: 33°32′56″N 133°25′58″E

Narutani Station (鳴谷駅, Narutani-eki) is a tram station in Ino, Agawa District, Kōchi Prefecture, Japan.

== Lines ==
- Tosa Electric Railway
  - Ino Line

== Adjacent stations ==
«	Service	»
Tosa Electric Railway
Ino Line
Kitayama	-	Ino-ekimae
