= Miyano-oku Station =

Tram station in Kōchi, Kōchi Prefecture, Japan

Coordinates: 33°33′09″N 133°28′33″E

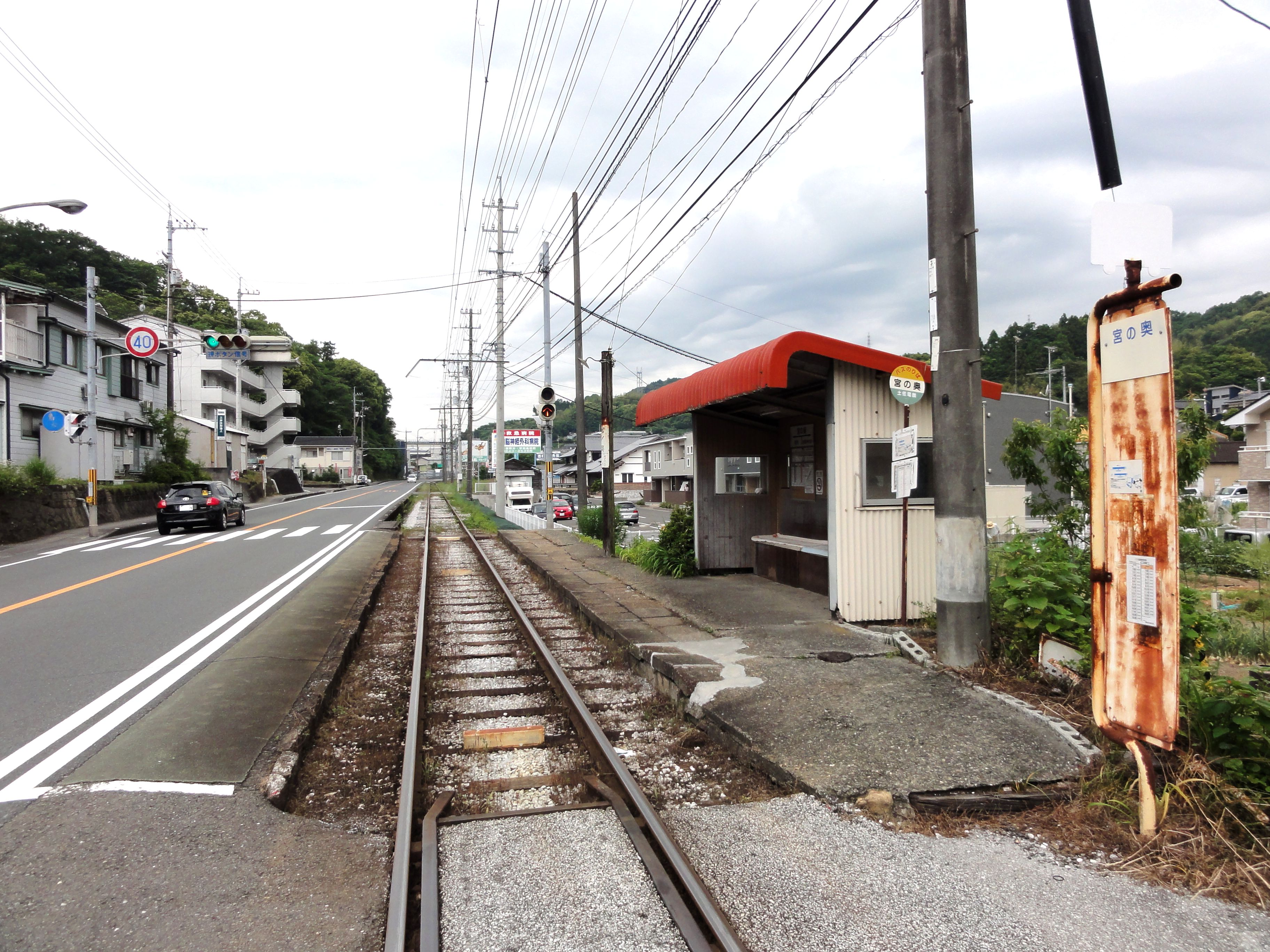
Miyano-oku Station

Miyano-oku station (宮の奥停留場, Miyano-oku-teiryūjō) is a tram stop in Kōchi, Kōchi Prefecture, Japan. It serves the Tosaden Kōtsū electric railway.

== Lines ==
- Tosa Electric Railway
  - Ino Line

== Adjacent stations ==
«	Service	»
Tosa Electric Railway
Ino Line
Asakurajinja-mae	-	Kōnai
