= Harimayabashi Station =

Tram station in Kōchi, Japan

Coordinates: 33°33′34″N 133°32′34″E

Harimayabashi Station はりまや橋駅
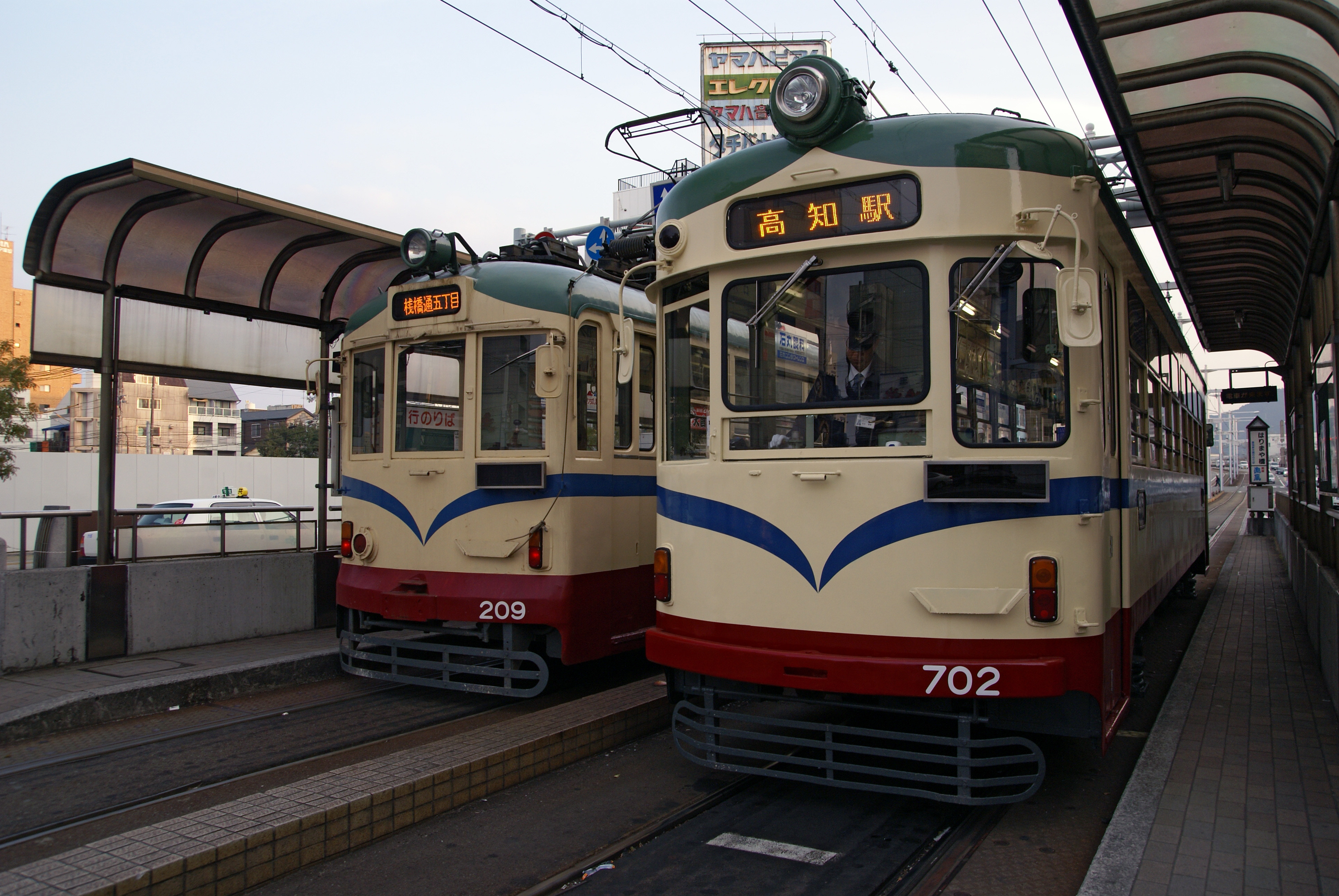
- Station on Sanbashi Line

General information
- Location: Kōchi; Japan
- Operator: Tosaden Kōtsū
- Lines: Ino Line, Gomen Line, Sanbashi Line

History
- Opened: October 31, 1908
Location

Harimayabashi Station (はりまや橋駅, Harimayabashi-eki) is a tram station in Kōchi, Kōchi Prefecture, Japan. It is operated by Tosaden Kōtsū and serves as a junction station to all three tram lines operated by the company.

== History ==
Harimayabashi Station opened along with the opening of Ino and Gomen tram lines on October 31, 1908. It was then operated by the Tosa Electric Railway, predecessor of Tosaden Kōtsū.

== Lines ==
- Tosaden Kōtsū
  - Ino Line
  - Gomen Line
  - Sanbashi Line

== Adjacent stations ==
| « | Service | » |
Ino Line
| Terminus | - | Horizume |
Gomen Line
| Dentetsu-Tāminarubiru-mae | - | Terminus |
Sanbashi Line
| Hasuikemachi-dōri | - | Umenotsuji |

== Surrounding area ==
- Harimayabashi
- Japan National Route 32
