= Hotarubashi Station =

Tram station in Kōchi, Kōchi Prefecture, Japan

Coordinates: 33°33′19″N 133°30′12″E

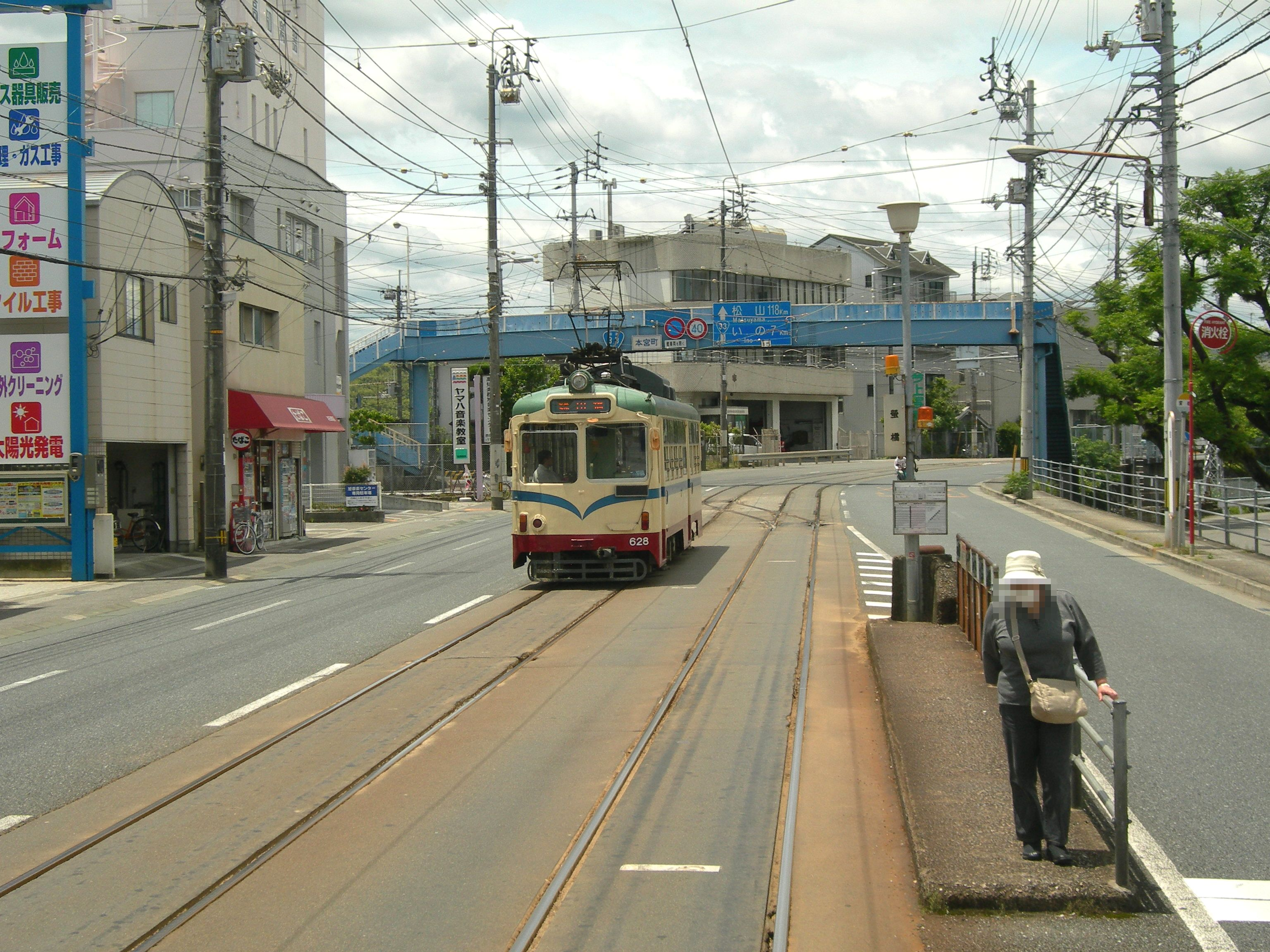
Station

Hotarubashi Station (蛍橋駅, Hotarubashi-eki) is a tram station in Kōchi, Kōchi Prefecture, Japan.

== Lines ==
- Tosa Electric Railway
  - Ino Line

== Adjacent stations ==
«	Service	»
Tosa Electric Railway
Ino Line
Asahimachi-sanchōme	-	Kagamigawabashi
