= Asahimachi-sanchōme Station =

Tram station in Kōchi, Kōchi Prefecture, Japan

Asahimachi-sanchōme 旭町三丁目駅
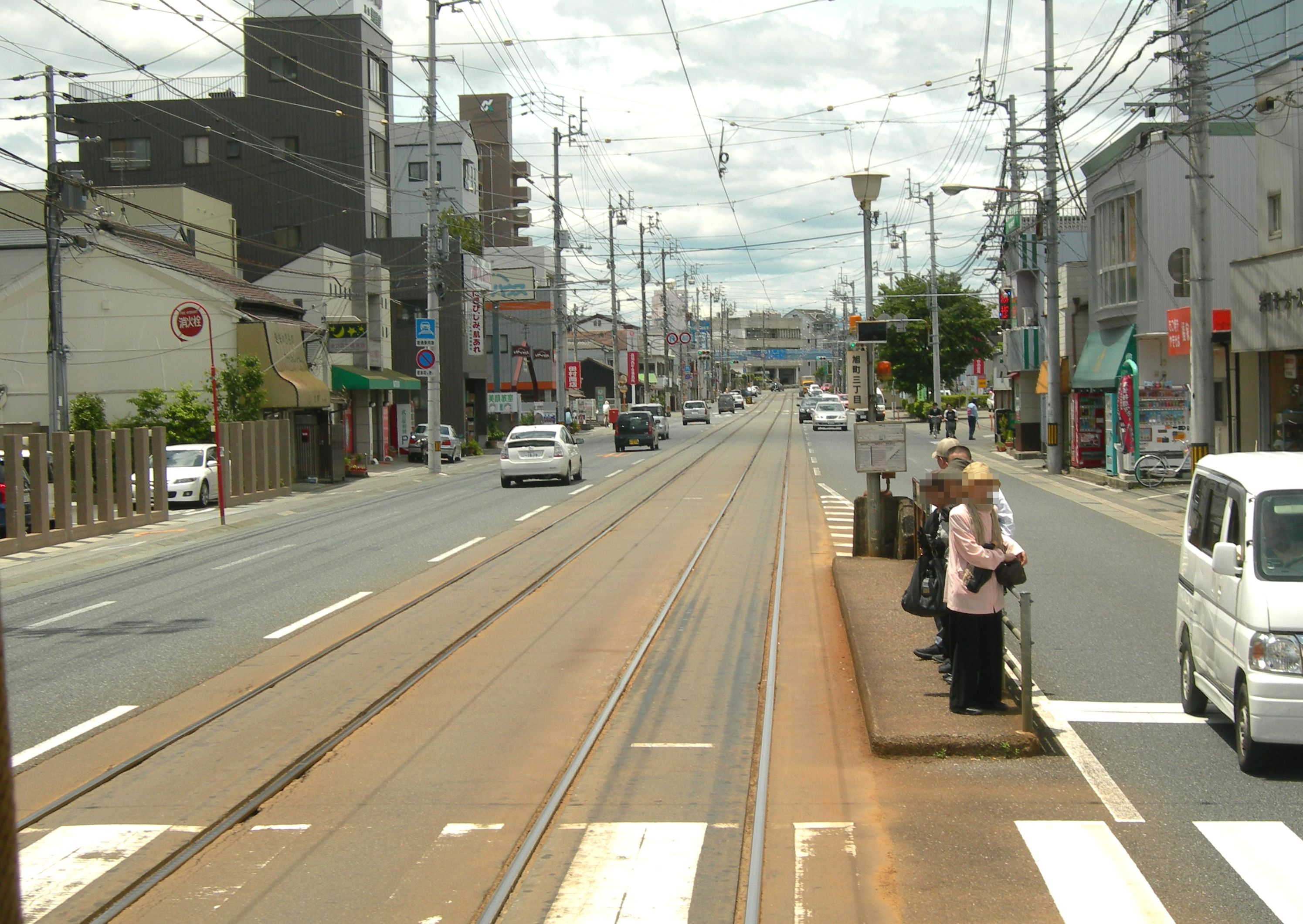

General information
- Location: Kōchi, Kōchi Prefecture; Japan
- Coordinates: 33.555629°N 133.506333°E
- System: tram stop
- Operator: Tosa Electric Railway
- Line: Ino Line

Services
Preceding station	Tosa Electric Railway	Following station
Asahi-ekimae-dōri	Ino Line	Hotarubashi
Location

Asahimachi-sanchōme Station (旭町三丁目駅, Asahimachi-sanchōme-eki) is a tram station on the Tosa Electric Railway's Ino Line in Kōchi, Kōchi Prefecture, Japan.

== See also ==
- List of railway lines in Japan
