= Kitauchi Station (Kōchi) =

Tram station in Ino, Kōchi Prefecture, Japan

Coordinates: 33°33′00″N 133°26′31″E

Kitauchi Station 北内駅
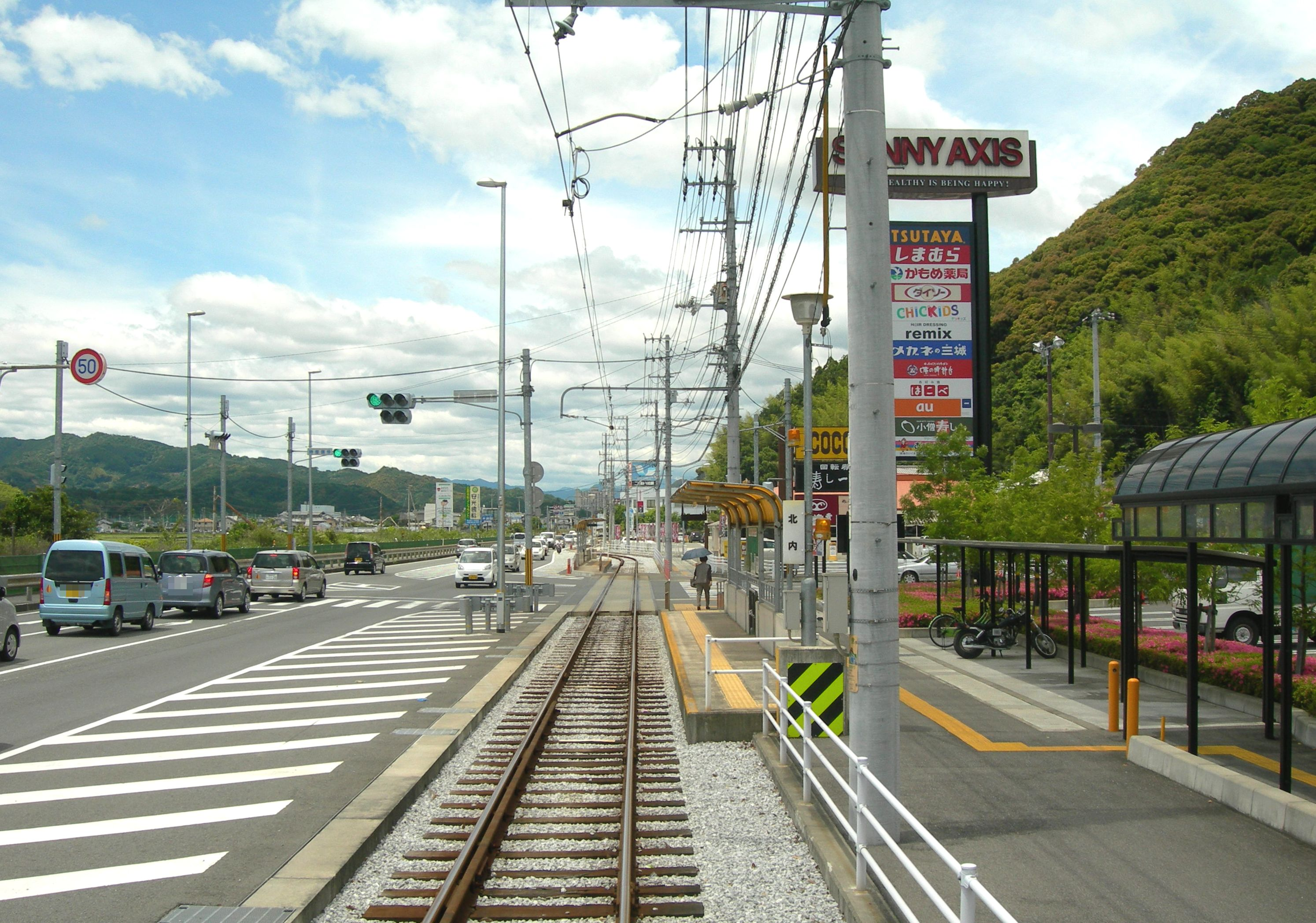

General information
- Location: Ino, Agawa District, Kōchi Prefecture, Japan
- Transit authority: Tosa Electric Railway
- Line: Ino Line
- Platforms: 2 side platforms
- Tracks: 1

History
- Opened: 10 January 2007
Location

Kitauchi Station (北内駅, Kitauchi-eki) is a tram station in Ino, Agawa District, Kōchi Prefecture, Japan.

== Lines ==
- Tosa Electric Railway
  - Ino Line

== Layout ==
1 track is sandwiched between 2 side platforms.

== Adjacent stations ==
«	Service	»
Tosa Electric Railway
Ino Line
Inoshō-mae	-	Kitayama
