= Konai =

Konai may be,

- Konai language
- Kōnai Station, Kōchi, Japan

== People ==
- Theodore Bar Konai
- Konai Helu Thaman
- Rajyadhar Konai
