= Ino, Kōchi =

Ino いの町
- Town
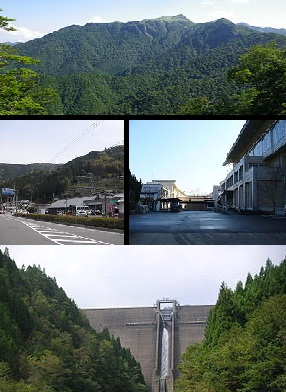
Mt.Kamegamori
Roadside Station Tosa washi kogeimura	Ino Commercial High School
Ohmorigawa Dam
- Flag Emblem
- Interactive map of Ino
- Location in Japan
- Coordinates: 33°33′N 133°26′E
- Country: Japan
- Region: Shikoku
- Prefecture: Kōchi
- District: Agawa

Area
  - Total: 470.97 km^{2} (181.84 sq mi)

Population (June 30, 2022)
  - Total: 21,672
  - Density: 46.016/km^{2} (119.18/sq mi)
- Time zone: UTC+09:00 (JST)
- City hall address: 1700-1 Ino-machi, Agawa-gun, Kōchi-ken 781-2192
- Climate: Cfa
- Website: Official website
- Symbols
- Bird: Varied tit
- Flower: Rhododendron
- Tree: Mitsumata

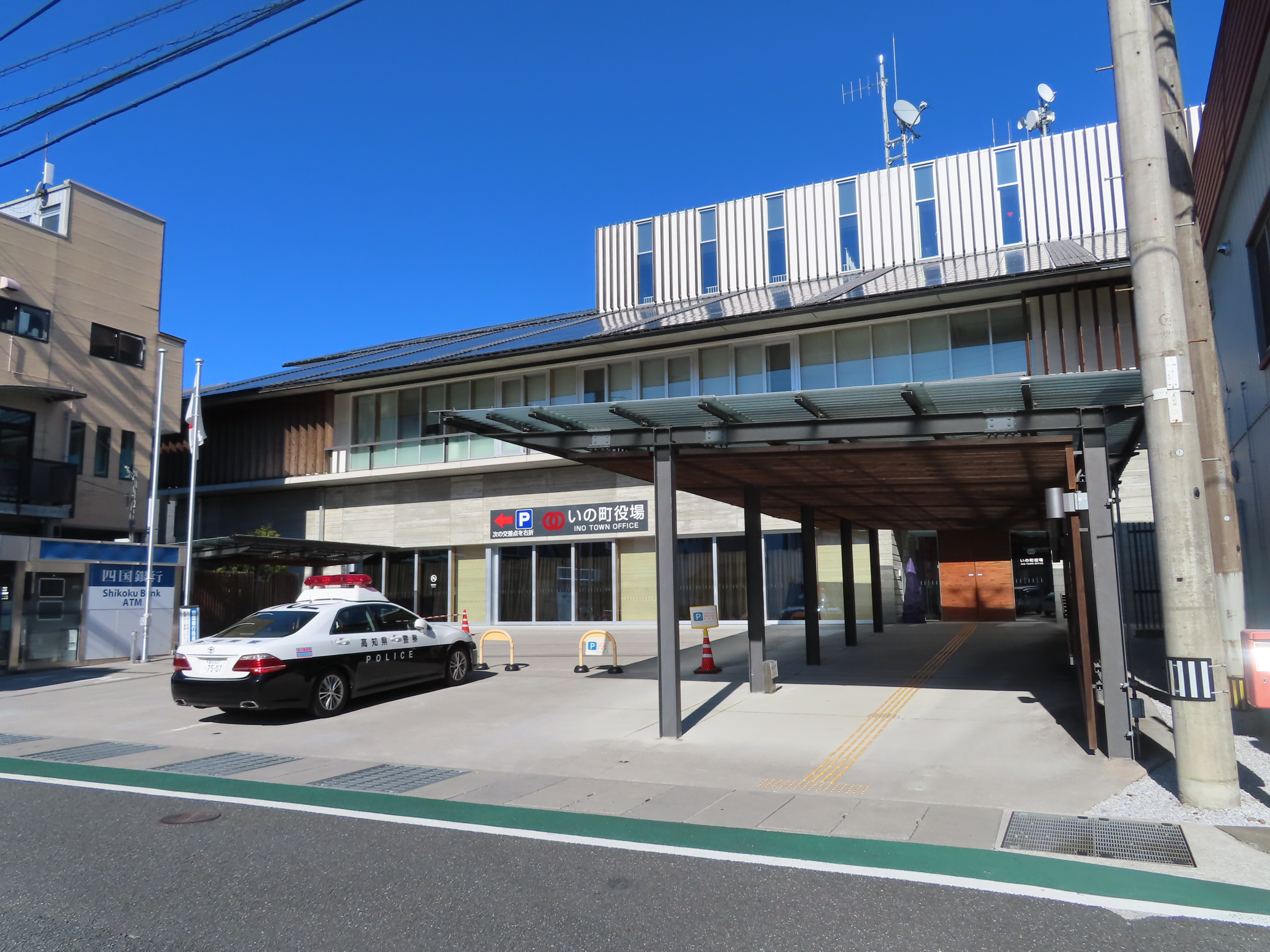
Ino Town Hall

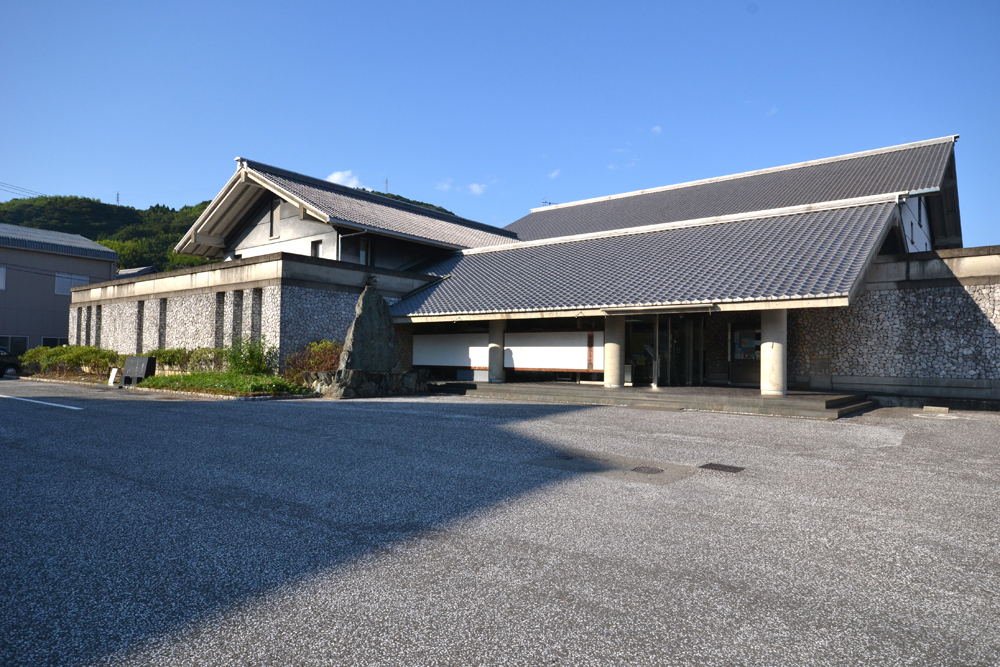
Ino Paper Museum

Ino (いの町, Ino-chō) is a town located in Agawa District, Kōchi Prefecture, Japan. As of 30 June 2022, the town had an estimated population of 21,672 in 10403 households and a population density of 46 persons per km^{2}. The total area of the town is 470.97 square kilometres (181.84 sq mi). The town is famous for the production of Japanese paper (和紙, washi).

== Geography ==
Ino is located in the Shikoku Mountains of north-central Kōchi Prefecture.

=== Neighbouring municipalities ===
Ehime Prefecture

- Kumakōgen
- Niihama
- Saijō

Kōchi Prefecture

- Hidaka
- Kōnan
- Niyodogawa
- Ochi
- Ōkawa
- Tosa
- Tosa

=== Climate ===
Ino has a humid subtropical climate (Köppen climate classification Cfa) with hot, humid summers and cool winters. There is significant precipitation throughout the year, especially during June and July. The average annual temperature in Ino is 12.2 °C (54.0 °F). The average annual rainfall is 3,184.2 mm (125.36 in) with September as the wettest month. The temperatures are highest on average in August, at around 23.1 °C (73.6 °F), and lowest in January, at around 1.6 °C (34.9 °F). The highest temperature ever recorded in Ino was 37.0 °C (98.6 °F) on 30 July 2026; the coldest temperature ever recorded was −10.8 °C (12.6 °F) on 15 January 1985.

Climate data for Ino (1991−2020 normals, extremes 1979−present)
Month	Jan	Feb	Mar	Apr	May	Jun	Jul	Aug	Sep	Oct	Nov	Dec	Year
Record high °C (°F)	16.7 (62.1)	19.8 (67.6)	23.8 (74.8)	29.0 (84.2)	31.0 (87.8)	33.1 (91.6)	37.0 (98.6)	36.0 (96.8)	32.7 (90.9)	27.5 (81.5)	22.6 (72.7)	20.1 (68.2)	37.0 (98.6)
Mean daily maximum °C (°F)	5.9 (42.6)	7.5 (45.5)	11.6 (52.9)	17.2 (63.0)	21.6 (70.9)	24.0 (75.2)	28.0 (82.4)	28.5 (83.3)	24.9 (76.8)	19.7 (67.5)	13.9 (57.0)	8.2 (46.8)	17.6 (63.7)
Daily mean °C (°F)	1.6 (34.9)	2.4 (36.3)	5.9 (42.6)	10.8 (51.4)	15.2 (59.4)	18.8 (65.8)	22.7 (72.9)	23.1 (73.6)	19.7 (67.5)	14.1 (57.4)	8.7 (47.7)	3.6 (38.5)	12.2 (54.0)
Mean daily minimum °C (°F)	−2.1 (28.2)	−1.7 (28.9)	0.9 (33.6)	5.2 (41.4)	9.8 (49.6)	14.8 (58.6)	19.0 (66.2)	19.5 (67.1)	16.1 (61.0)	9.9 (49.8)	4.5 (40.1)	−0.1 (31.8)	8.0 (46.4)
Record low °C (°F)	−10.8 (12.6)	−10.4 (13.3)	−8.7 (16.3)	−3.7 (25.3)	−0.2 (31.6)	4.6 (40.3)	9.4 (48.9)	12.0 (53.6)	4.8 (40.6)	−0.1 (31.8)	−3.2 (26.2)	−8.2 (17.2)	−10.8 (12.6)
Average precipitation mm (inches)	76.1 (3.00)	114.3 (4.50)	192.8 (7.59)	221.3 (8.71)	264.8 (10.43)	367.8 (14.48)	457.8 (18.02)	514.1 (20.24)	531.9 (20.94)	222.9 (8.78)	123.2 (4.85)	97.5 (3.84)	3,184.2 (125.36)
Average precipitation days (≥ 1.0 mm)	8.2	9.7	12.4	11.5	11.5	15.0	14.4	14.1	13.7	9.7	8.9	9.5	138.6
Mean monthly sunshine hours	—	—	—	—	—	—	—	—	—	—	—	—	1,444.5
Source: Japan Meteorological Agency

== Demographics ==
Per Japanese census data, the population of Ino in 2020 is 21,374 people. Ino has been conducting censuses since 1920. As with the general aging of Japan, Ino faces demographic challenges with many local businesses struggling to find enough workers and closing down.

Historical population
Year	Pop.	±%
1920	32,263	—
1925	31,858	−1.3%
1930	31,715	−0.4%
1935	31,110	−1.9%
1940	33,642	+8.1%
1945	37,370	+11.1%
1950	37,817	+1.2%
1955	36,197	−4.3%
1960	33,330	−7.9%
1965	29,803	−10.6%
1970	27,593	−7.4%
1975	28,196	+2.2%
1980	29,036	+3.0%
1985	28,423	−2.1%
1990	28,293	−0.5%
1995	30,079	+6.3%
2000	28,729	−4.5%
2005	27,068	−5.8%
2010	25,062	−7.4%
2015	22,767	−9.2%
2020	21,374	−6.1%
Ino population statistics

== History ==
As with all of Kōchi Prefecture, the area of Ino was part of ancient Tosa Province. During the Edo period, the area was part of the holdings of Tosa Domain ruled by the Yamauchi clan from their seat at Kōchi Castle. Following the Meiji restoration, the village of Ino was established within Agawa District, Kōchi with the creation of the modern municipalities system on October 1, 1889. On October 1, 2004, the village of Gohoku, also from Agawa District, and the village of Hongawa, from Tosa District, were merged into Ino, increasing its size by almost a factor of five.

== Government ==
Ino has a mayor-council form of government with a directly elected mayor and a unicameral town council of 18 members. Ino, together with the municipalities of Agawa District, contributes two members to the Kōchi Prefectural Assembly. In terms of national politics, the town is part of Kōchi 2nd district of the lower house of the Diet of Japan.

== Economy ==
Traditionally, agriculture, forestry and paper production were mainstays of the local economy.

== Education ==
Ino has seven public elementary schools and five public middle schools operated by the town government and two public high schools operated by the Kōchi Prefectural Department of Education.

== Transportation ==
=== Railway ===
JR Shikoku - Dosan Line

- Edagawa - Ino - Hakawa

Tosaden Kōtsū - Ino Line (tram line)

- Ujidanchi-mae - Yashiro-dōri - Nakayama - Edagawa - Inoshō-mae - Kitauchi - Kitayama - Narutani - Ino-ekimae - Ino

=== Highways ===
- Kōchi Expressway
- National Route 33
- National Route 194
- National Route 439

== Sister cities ==
- Cotia, São Paulo, Brazil, since June 16, 1966

== Local attractions ==
- Ino Paper Museum

== Noted people from Ino ==
- Arase Nagahide, sumo wrestler and television personality
