= Kamobe Station =

Tram station in Kōchi, Kōchi Prefecture, Japan

Coordinates: 33.5522°N 133.4968°E

Kamobe Station (鴨部駅, Kamobe-eki) is a tram station in Kōchi, Kōchi Prefecture, Japan.

== Lines ==
- Tosa Electric Railway
  - Ino Line

== Adjacent stations ==
| « | Service | » |
Tosa Electric Railway
Ino Line
| Kagamigawabashi | - | Akebonochō-higashimachi |
