= Kagamigawabashi Station =

Tram station in Kōchi, Kōchi Prefecture, Japan

Coordinates: 33°33′20″N 133°29′56″E

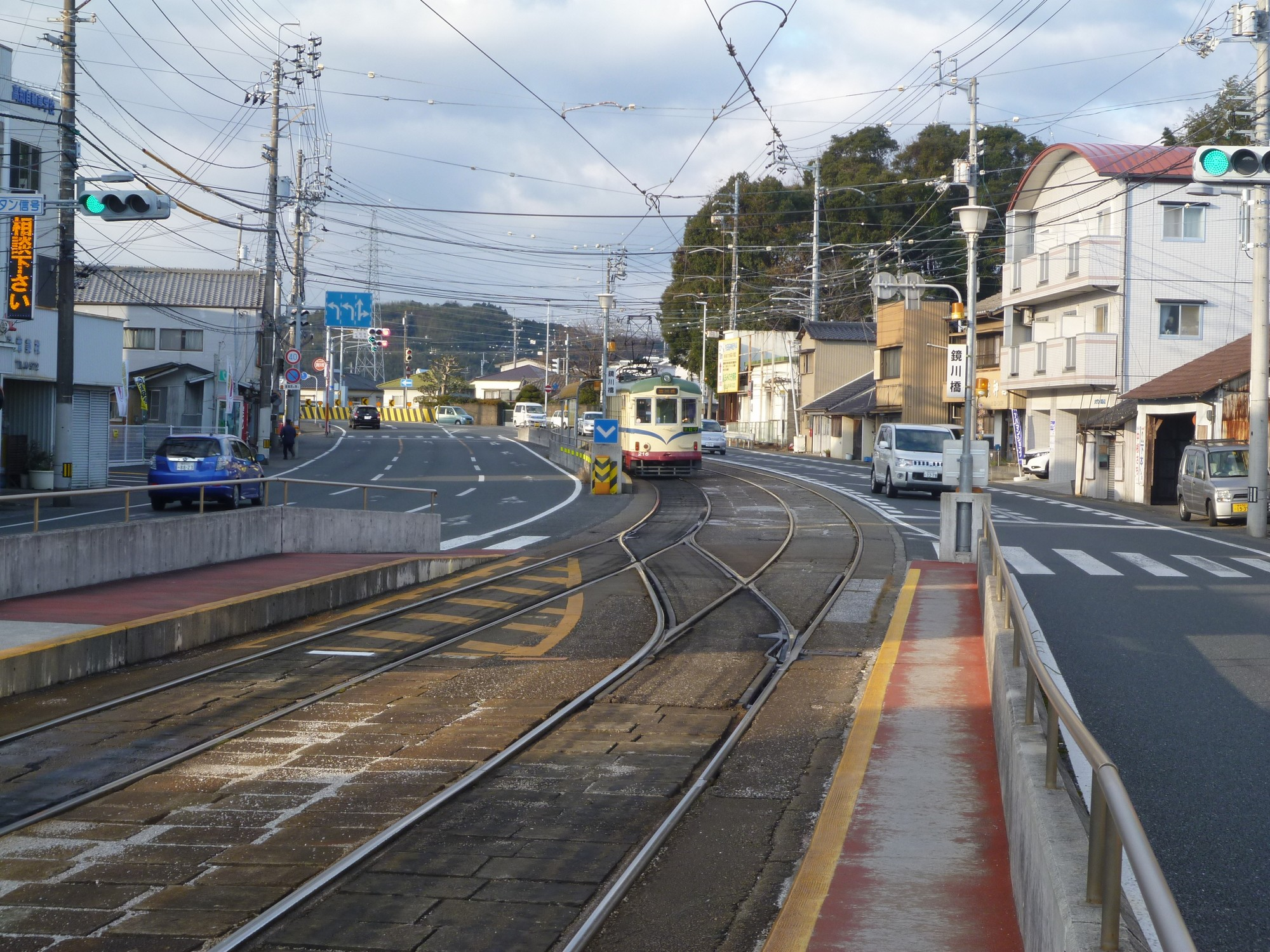
Kagamigawabashi Station

Kagamigawabashi Station (鏡川橋駅, Kagamigawabashi-eki) is a tram station in Kōchi, Kōchi Prefecture, Japan.

== Lines ==
- Tosa Electric Railway
  - Ino Line

== Adjacent stations ==
«	Service	»
Tosa Electric Railway
Ino Line
Hotarubashi	-	Kamobe
