= Ujidanchi-mae Station =

Tram station in Ino, Kōchi Prefecture, Japan

Coordinates: 33°33′07″N 133°27′40″E

Ujidanchi-mae Station (宇治団地前駅, Ujidanchi-mae-eki) is a tram station in Ino, Agawa District, Kōchi Prefecture, Japan.

== Lines ==
- Tosa Electric Railway
  - Ino Line

== Adjacent stations ==
| « | Service | » |
Tosa Electric Railway
Ino Line
| Kōnai | - | Yashiro-dōri |
