= Yashiro-dōri Station =

Tram station in Ino, Kōchi Prefecture, Japan

Coordinates: 33°33′08″N 133°27′23″E

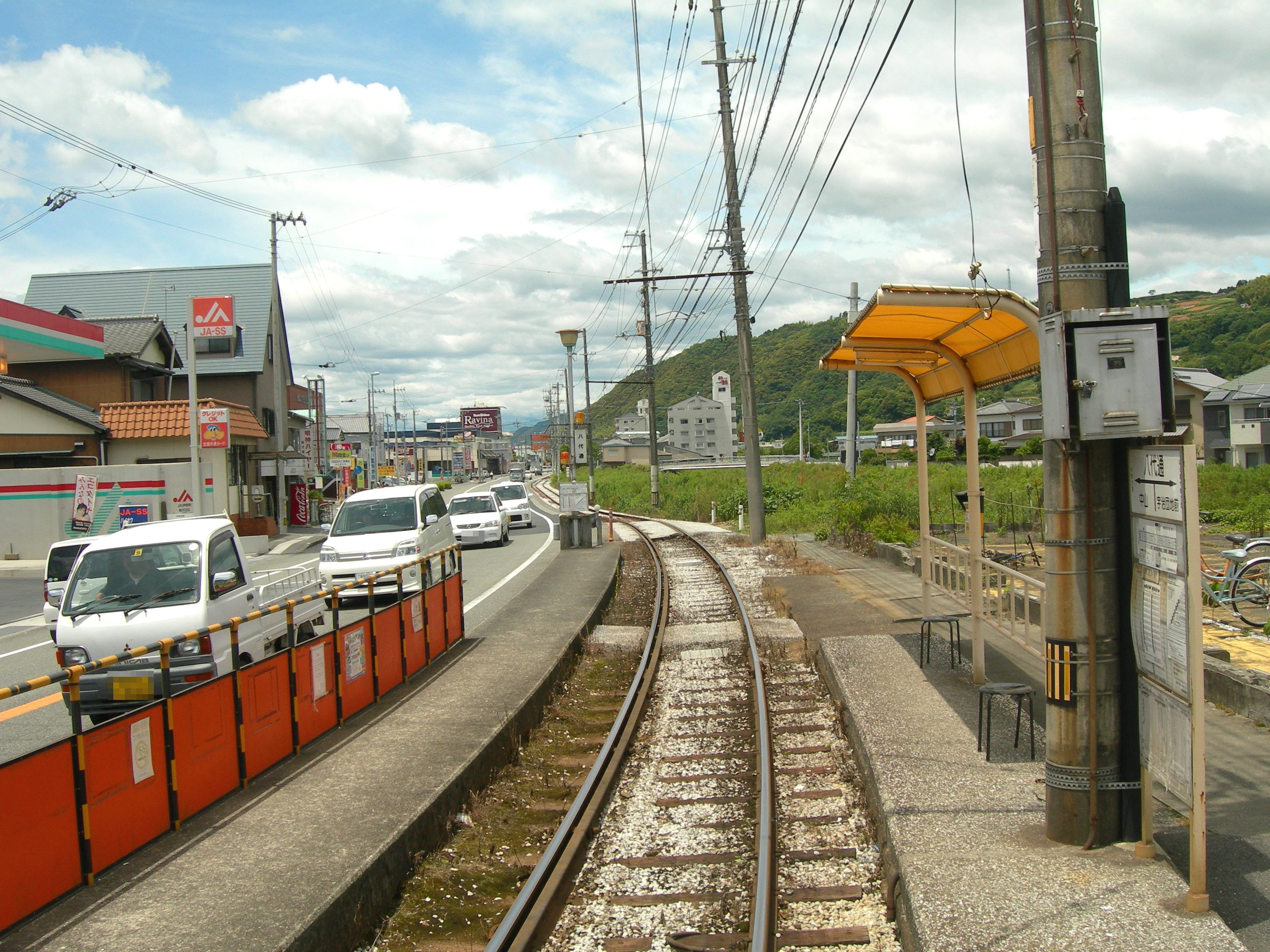
Station 27 May 2010

Yashiro-dōri Station (八代通駅, Yashiro-dōri-eki) is a tram station in Ino, Agawa District, Kōchi Prefecture, Japan.

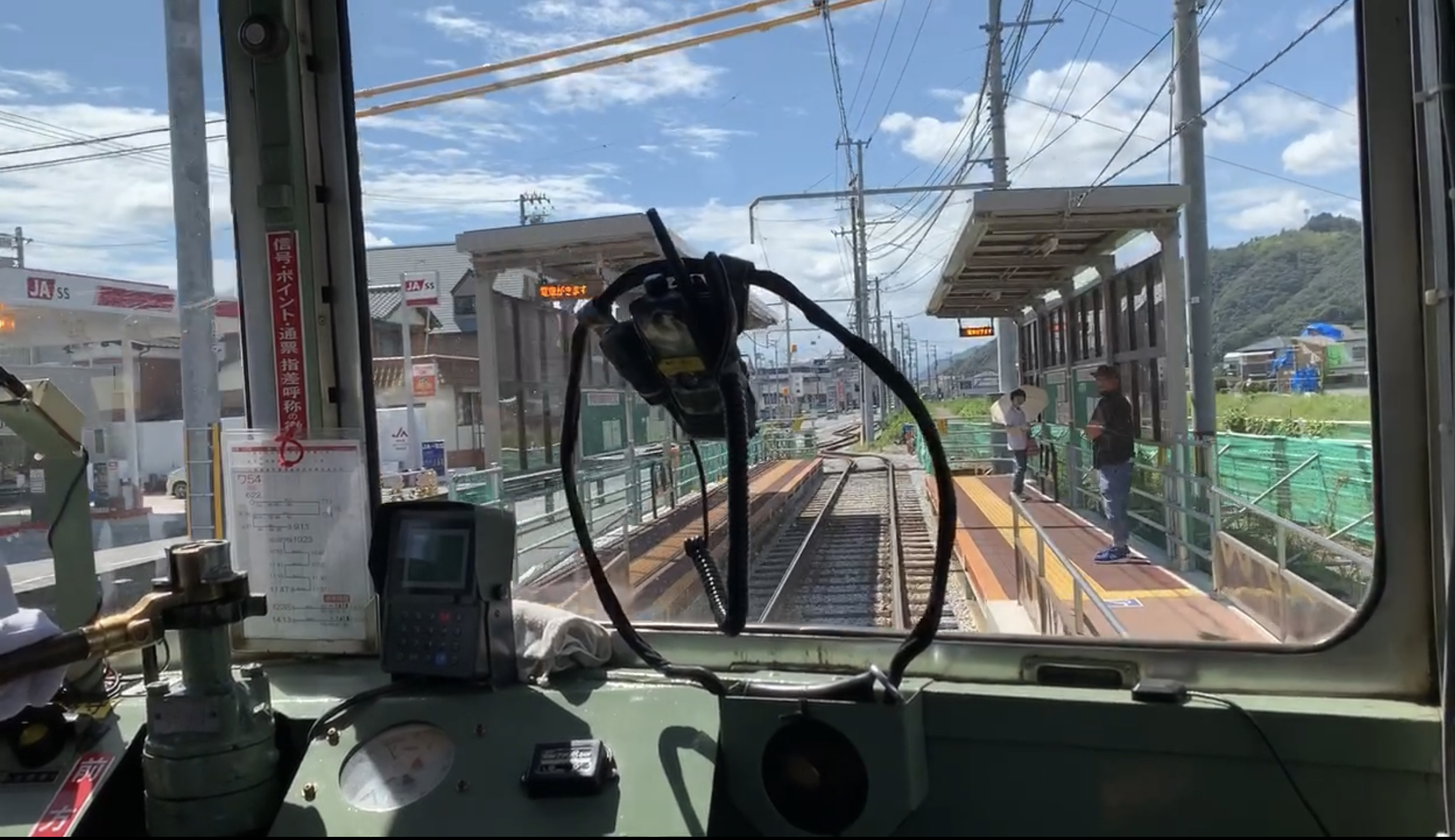
Approaching Yashirodori Station showing rebuilt platforms 14-Sep-2019

== Lines ==
- Tosa Electric Railway
  - Ino Line

== Adjacent stations ==
«	Service	»
Tosa Electric Railway
Ino Line
Ujidanchi-mae	-	Nakayama
