= Kōchi-Shōgyō-Mae Station =

Railway station in Kōchi, Japan

Kōchi-Shōgyō-Mae Station 高知商業前駅
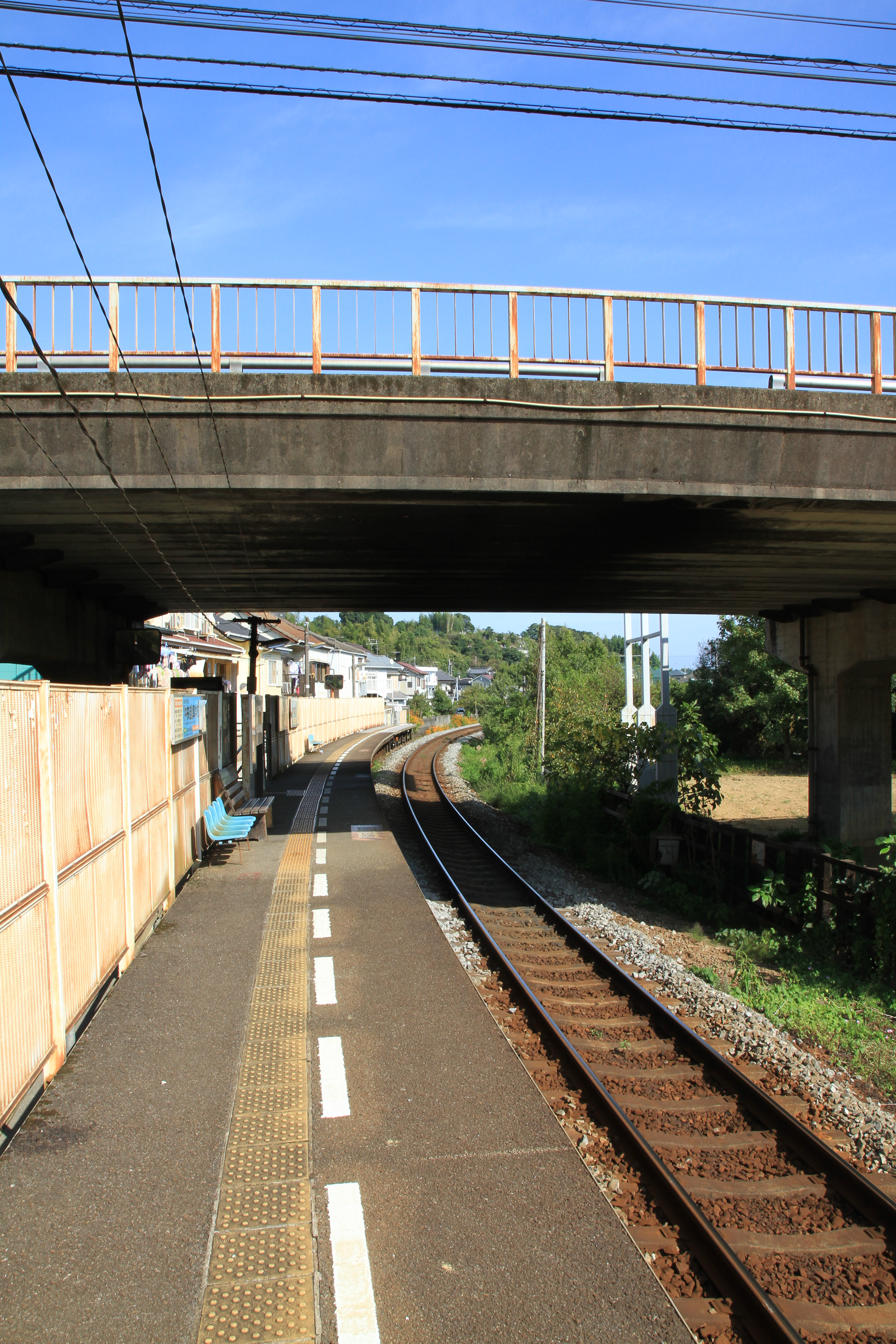
- Kōchi-Shōgyō-Mae Station in 2011

General information
- Location: Nagaoyamacho, Kochi-shi, Kōchi-ken 780-0953; Japan
- Coordinates: 33°33′31″N 133°29′51″E
- Operator: JR Shikoku
- Line: ■ Dosan Line
- Distance: 131.3 km from Tadotsu
- Platforms: 1 side platform
- Tracks: 1
- Connections: Tosaden Kōtsū tramstop

Other information
- Status: Unstaffed
- Station code: K04

History
- Opened: 1 November 1986
- Former names: Kōchi-Shōgyō-Mae Temporary Stop (until 1987)

Passengers
- FY2019: 1094
Location
- Location within Kochi Prefecture Location within Japan

Kōchi-Shōgyō-Mae Station (高知商業前駅, Kōchi-Shōgyō-Mae-eki) is a passenger railway station located in the city of Kōchi city, the capital of Kōchi Prefecture, Japan. It is operated by JR Shikoku and has the station number "K04".

== Lines ==
The station is served by JR Shikoku's Dosan Line and is located 131.3 km from the beginning of the line at Tadotsu.

== Layout ==
The station, which is unstaffed, consists of a side platform serving a curved section of track. There is no station building or shelter. A road viaduct crosses the tracks over part of the platform, providing cover from weather.

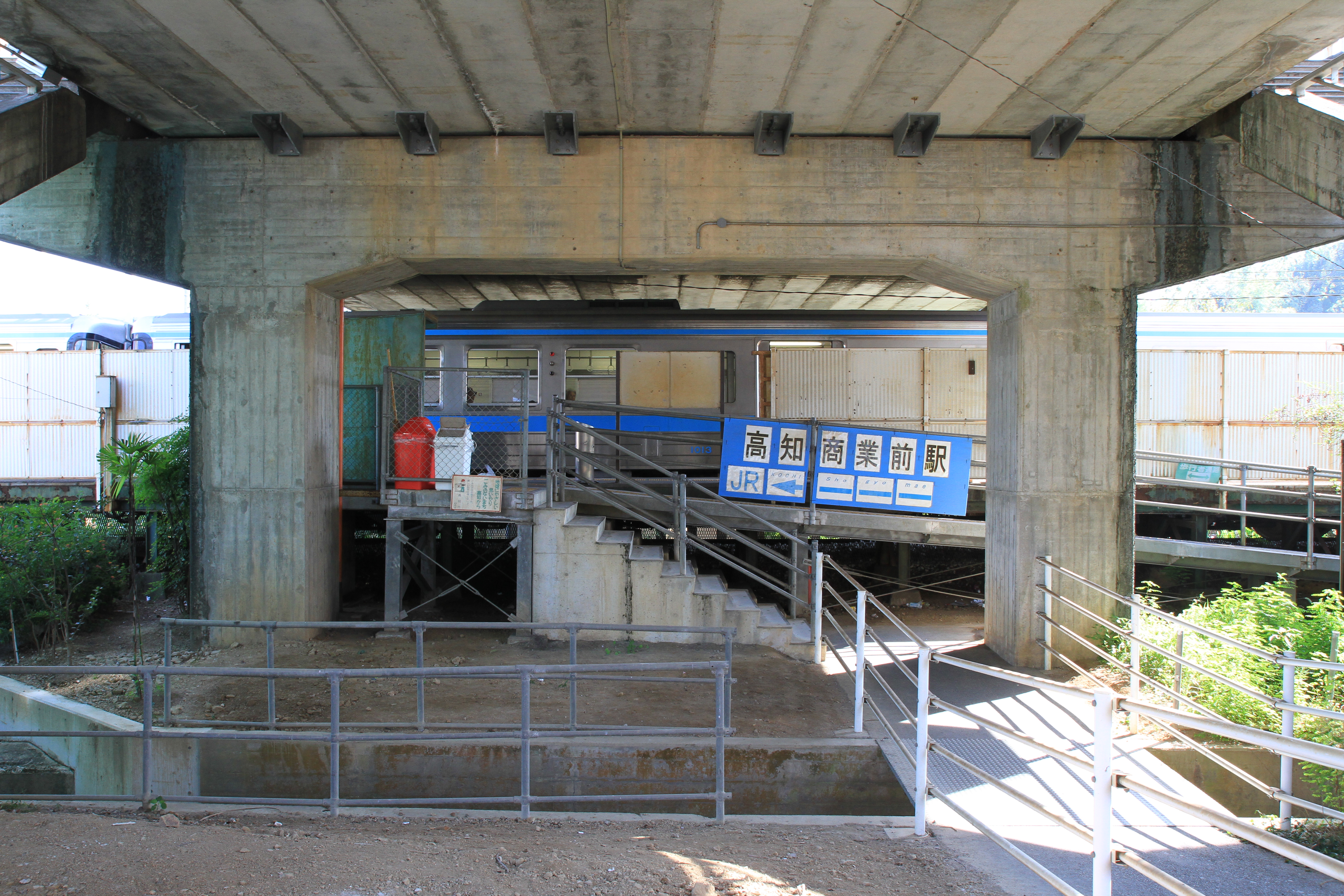
View of the station entrance under the road viaduct in 2011

== Adjacent stations ==
«	Service	»
Dosan Line
Asahi	Local	Asakura

== History ==
The station opened on 1 November 1986 as Kōchi-Shōgyō-Mae Temporary Stop (高知商業前臨時乗降場, Kōchi-Shōgyō-Mae-Rinji-jōkō-ba) operated by Japanese National Railways (JNR). With the privatization of JNR on 1 April 1987, control passed to JR Shikoku and it was renamed Kōchi-Shōgyō-Mae Station.

== Connections ==
Kagamigawabashi Station (鏡川橋駅, Kagamigawabashi-eki), a tramstop on the Ino Line (伊野線, Ino-sen) operated by Tosaden Kōtsū (とさでん交通), is located about 300 metres from the station.

== Surrounding area ==
- Kochi Municipal Kochi Commercial High School

== See also ==
- List of railway stations in Japan
