= Ino Station (Tosaden) =

Tram station in Ino, Kōchi Prefecture, Japan

Coordinates: 33°32′54″N 133°25′45″E

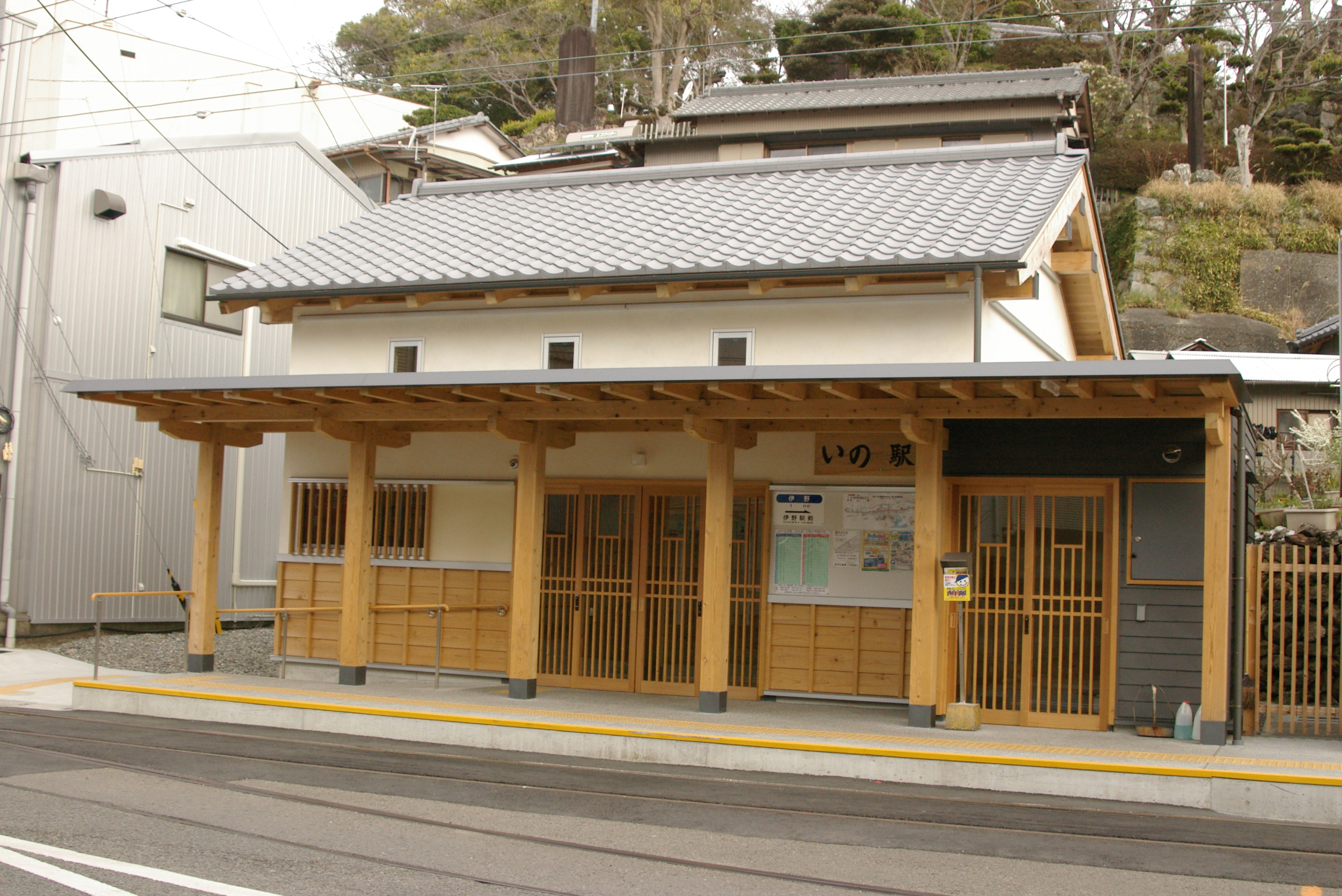
Station building

Ino Station (伊野駅, Ino-eki) is a tram station in Ino, Agawa District, Kōchi Prefecture, Japan.

== Lines ==
- Tosaden Kōtsū
  - Ino Line

== Adjacent stations ==
«	Service	»
Ino Line
Ino-ekimae	-	Terminus
