= Kitayama Station =

Kitayama Station is the name of multiple train stations in Japan.

- Kitayama Station (Aichi) - (喜多山駅) in Aichi Prefecture
- Kitayama Station (Ehime) - (喜多山駅) in Ehime Prefecture
- Kitayama Station (Kōchi) - (北山駅) in Kōchi Prefecture
- Kitayama Station (Kyoto) - (北山駅) in Kyoto
- Kitayama Station (Miyagi) - (北山駅) in Miyagi Prefecture
- Kitayama Station (Tochigi) - (北山駅) in Tochigi Prefecture
