= Kamimachi-nichōme Station =

Tram station in Kōchi, Kōchi Prefecture, Japan

Coordinates: 33°33′26″N 133°31′23″E

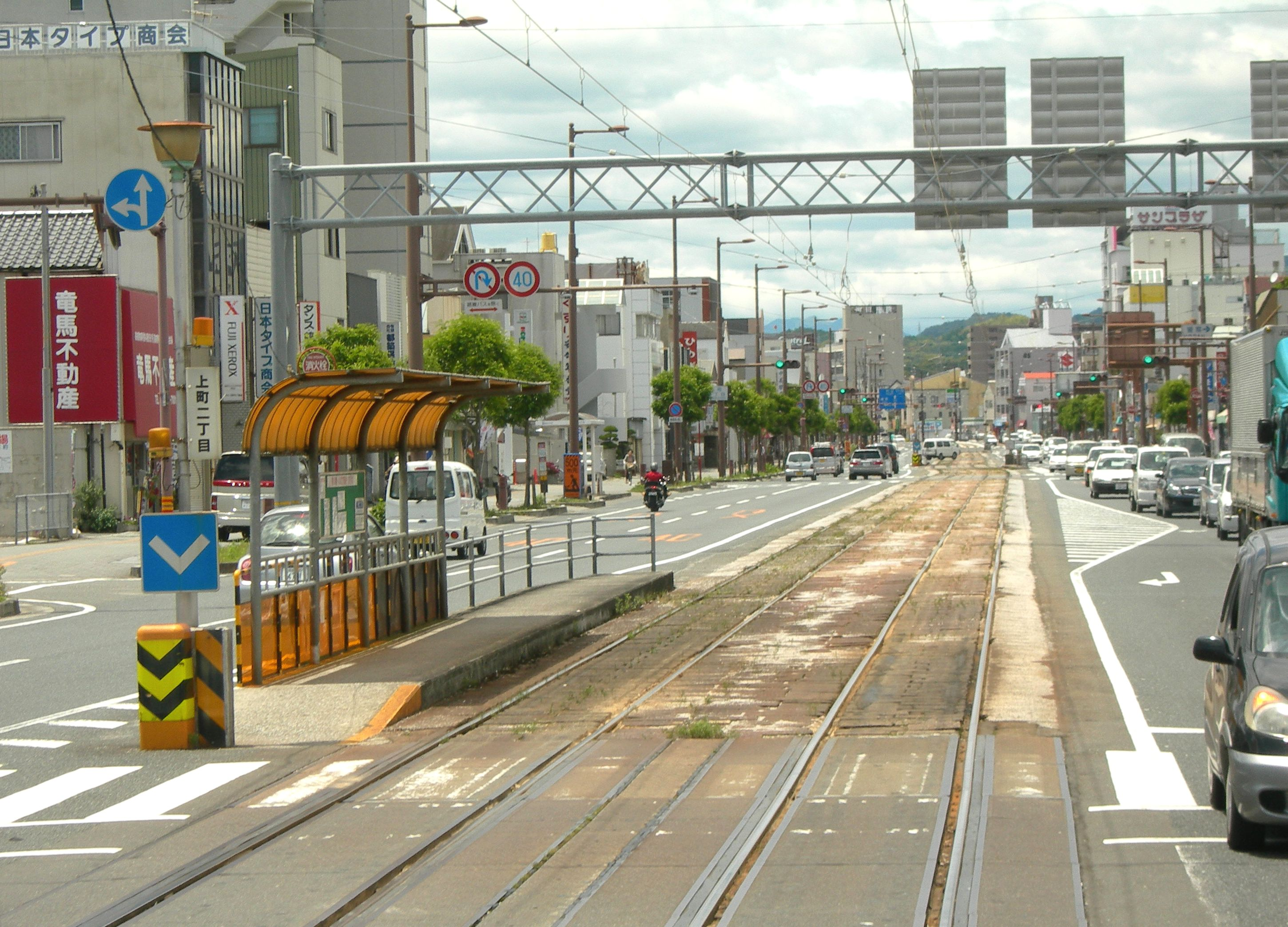
Station

Kamimachi-nichōme Station (上町二丁目駅, Kamimachi-nichōme-eki) is a tram station in Kōchi, Kōchi Prefecture, Japan.

== Lines ==
- Tosa Electric Railway
  - Ino Line

== Adjacent stations ==
«	Service	»
Tosa Electric Railway
Ino Line
Kamimachi-itchōme	-	Kamimachi-yonchōme
