= Nakayama Station (Kōchi) =

Tram station in Ino, Kōchi Prefecture, Japan

Nakayama Station 中山駅
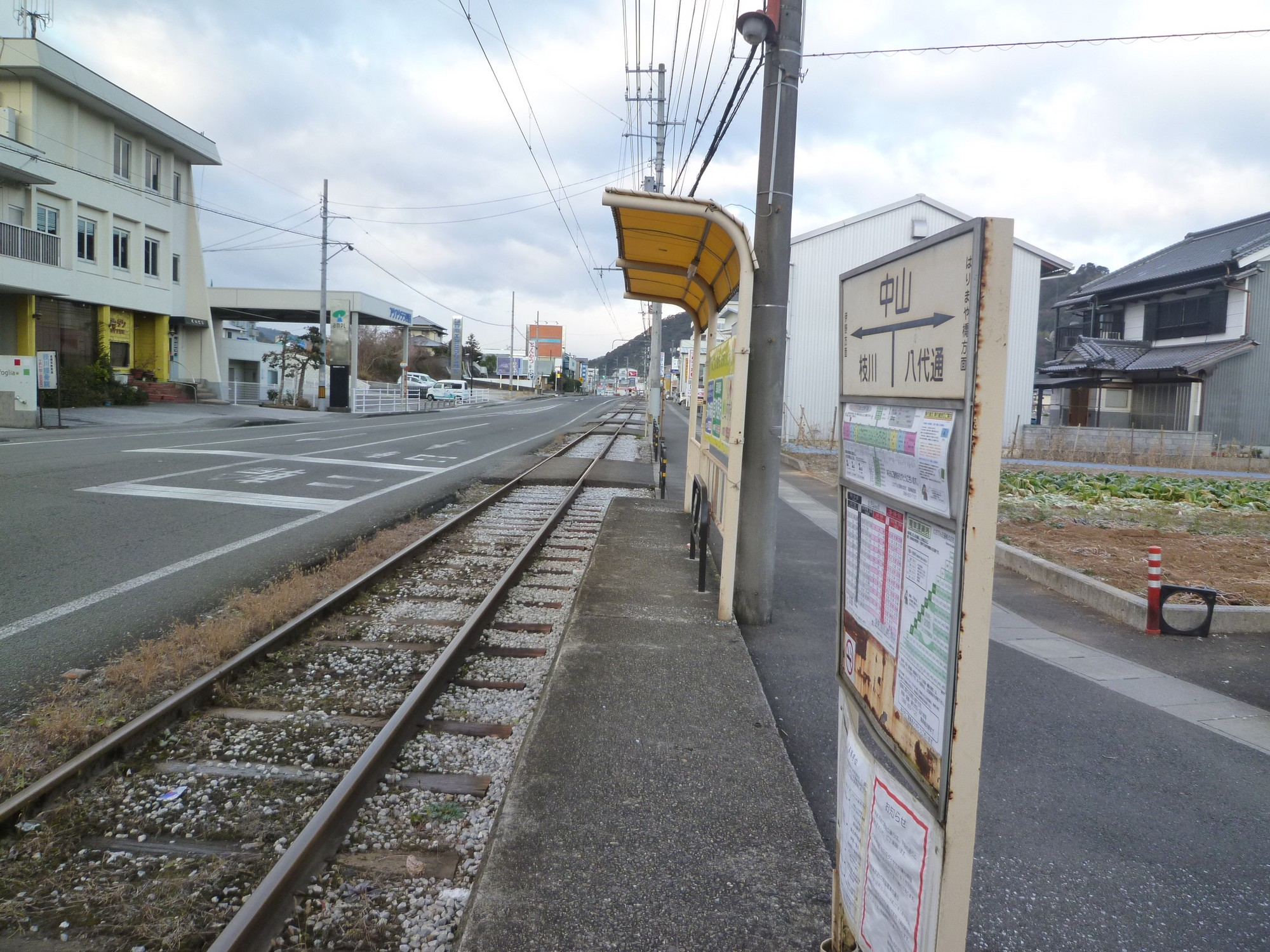

General information
- Location: Ino, Agawa District, Kōchi Prefecture; Japan
- Coordinates: 33°33′06″N 133°27′09″E
Location

Nakayama Station (中山駅, Nakayama-eki) is a tram station in Ino, Agawa District, Kōchi Prefecture, Japan.

== Lines ==
- Tosa Electric Railway
  - Ino Line

== Adjacent stations ==
«	Service	»
Tosa Electric Railway
Ino Line
Yashiro-dōri	-	Edagawa
