= Akebonochō Station =

Tram station in Kōchi, Kōchi Prefecture, Japan

Coordinates: 33°33′04″N 133°29′27″E

Akebonochō Station (曙町駅, Akebonochō-eki) is a tram station in Kōchi, Kōchi Prefecture, Japan.

== History ==
。

- September 16, 1907 - Opened as a tram stop for Tosa Electric Railway.。
- October 1, 2014 - Tosa Electric Railway merged operations with Tosaden Dream Service and KOCHIKENKOTSU to form Tosaden Traffic. It is now the tram stop for Tosaden Traffic.

== Lines ==
- Tosa Electric Railway
  - Ino Line

== Adjacent stations ==
«	Service	»
Tosa Electric Railway
Ino Line
Akebonochō-higashimachi	-	Asakura
