= Asakura Station =

Asakura Station (朝倉駅) is the name of several train stations in Japan:

- Asakura Station (Aichi) in Aichi Prefecture
- Asakura Station (JR Shikoku) in Kōchi Prefecture
- Asakura Station (Tosa Electric Railway) in Kōchi Prefecture
