= Horizume Station =

Tram station in Kōchi, Kōchi Prefecture, Japan

Coordinates: 33°33′34″N 133°32′22″E

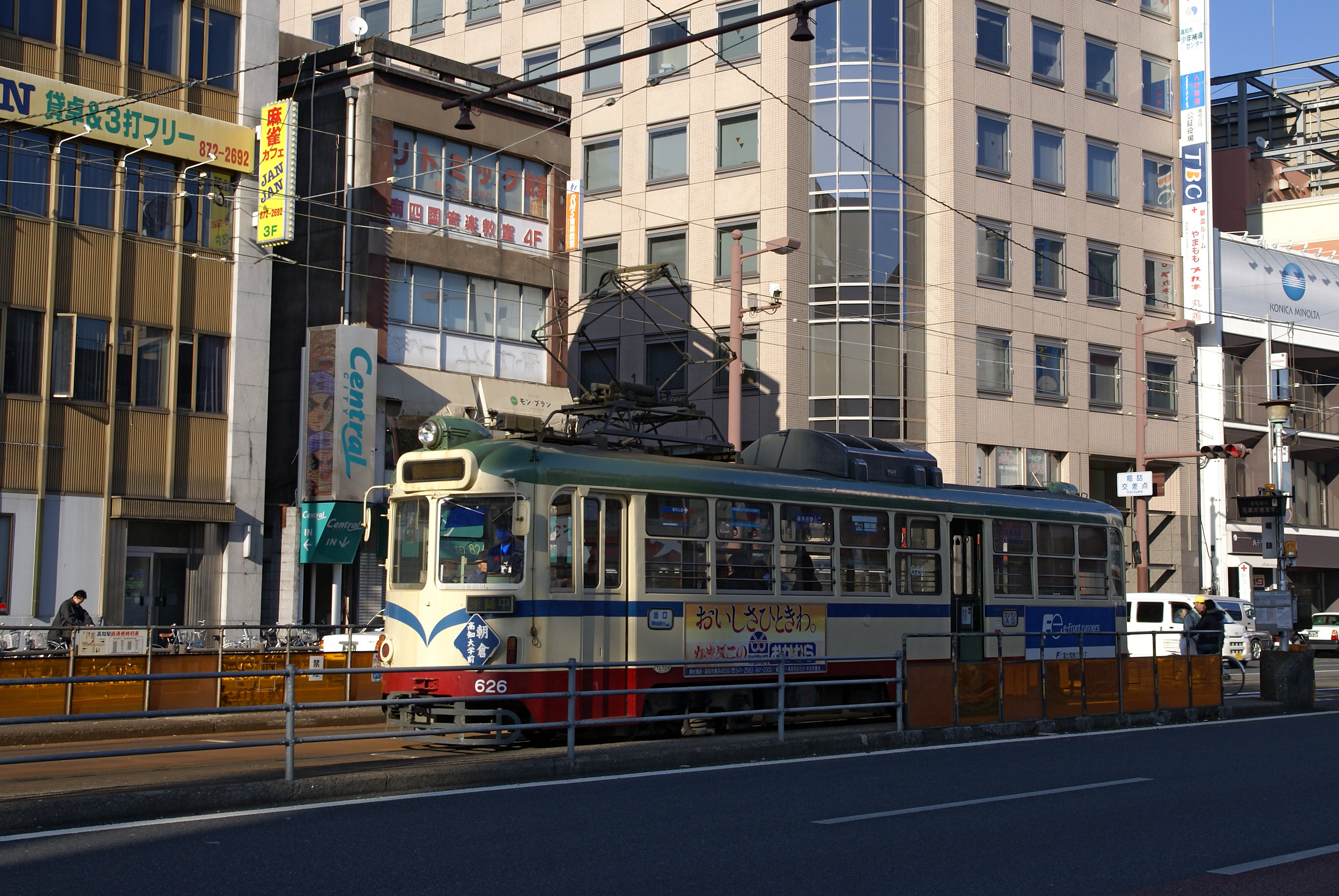
Station

Horizume Station (堀詰駅, Horizume-eki) is a tram station in Kōchi, Kōchi Prefecture, Japan.

== Lines ==
- Tosa Electric Railway
  - Ino Line

== Adjacent stations ==
«	Service	»
Tosa Electric Railway
Ino Line
Harimayabashi	-	Ōhashidōri
