= Kamimachi-yonchōme Station =

Tram station in Kōchi, Kōchi Prefecture, Japan

Coordinates: 33°33′26″N 133°31′11″E

Kamimachi-yonchōme Station (上町四丁目駅, Kamimachi-yonchōme-eki) is a tram station in Kōchi, Kōchi Prefecture, Japan.

== Lines ==
- Tosa Electric Railway
  - Ino Line

== Adjacent stations ==
| « | Service | » |
Tosa Electric Railway
Ino Line
| Kamimachi-nichōme | - | Kamimachi-gochōme |
