= Asakurajinja-mae Station =

Tram station in Kōchi, Kōchi Prefecture, Japan

Asakurajinja-mae 朝倉神社前駅
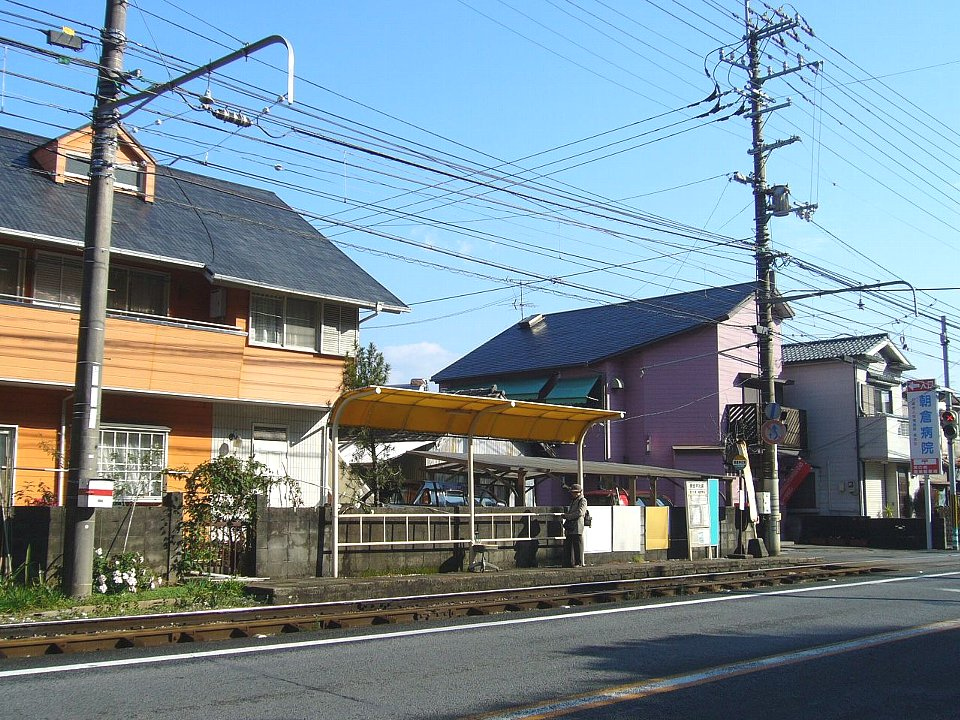

General information
- Location: Kōchi, Kōchi Prefecture; Japan
- Coordinates: 33°33′07″N 133°28′51″E
- System: tram station
- Operator: Tosa Electric Railway
- Line: Ino Line
Location

Asakurajinja-mae Station (朝倉神社前駅, Asakurajinja-mae-eki) is a tram station in Kōchi, Kōchi Prefecture, Japan.

== Lines ==
- Tosa Electric Railway
  - Ino Line

== Adjacent stations ==
«	Service	»
Tosa Electric Railway
Ino Line
Asakura-ekimae	-	Miyano-oku

== See also ==
- List of railway lines in Japan
