= Ino-ekimae Station =

Tram station in Ino, Kōchi Prefecture, Japan

Coordinates: 33°32′55″N 133°25′48″E

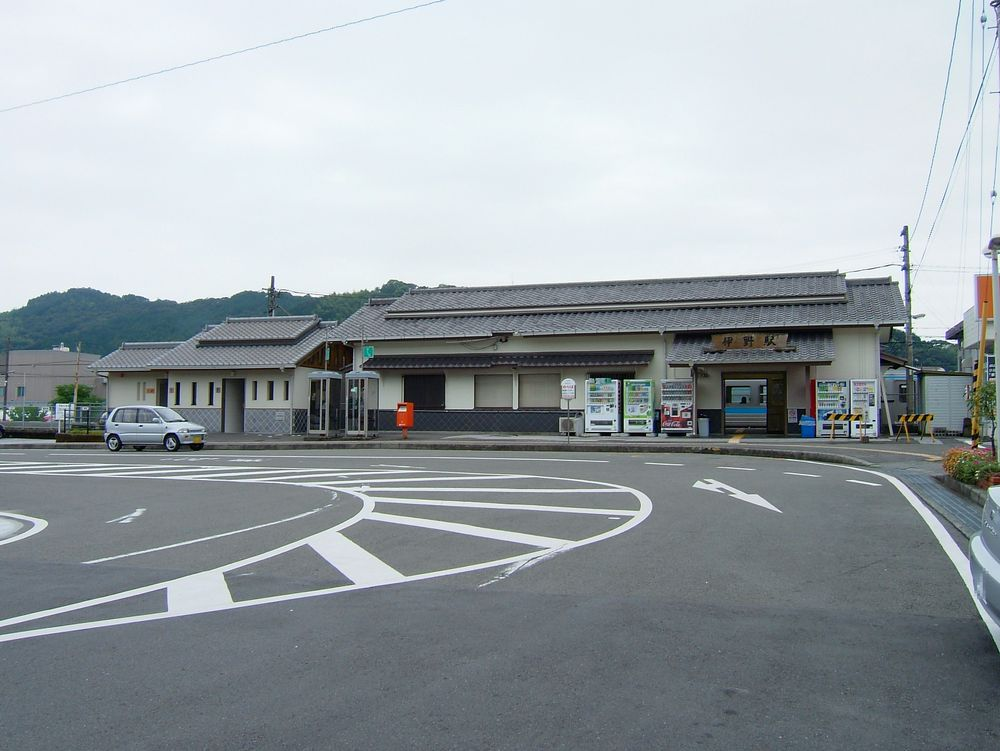
Ino-ekimae Station

Ino-ekimae Station (伊野駅前駅, Ino-ekimae-eki) is a tram station in Ino, Agawa District, Kōchi Prefecture, Japan.

== Lines ==
- Tosa Electric Railway
  - Ino Line

== Adjacent stations ==
«	Service	»
Tosa Electric Railway
Ino Line
Narutani	-	Ino
