= Kōnai Station =

Tram station in Kōchi, Kōchi Prefecture, Japan

Kōnai Station Kōnai Station (咥内駅, Kōnai-eki)
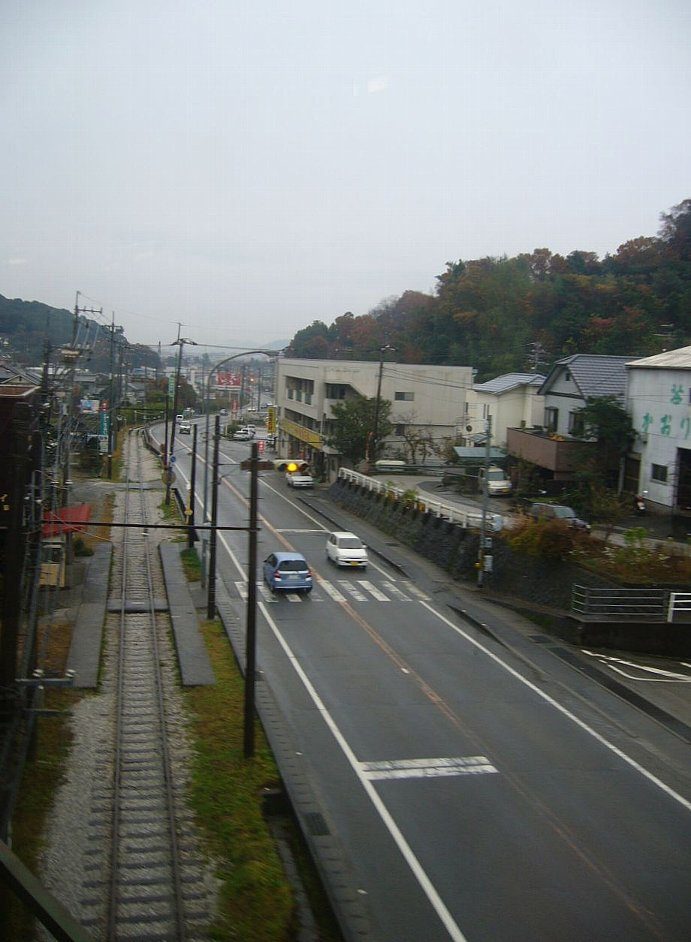
- Aerial view of the station

General information
- Location: Hei Asakura, Kochi, 780-8063; Japan
- Coordinates: 33°33′09″N 133°28′16″E
Location

Kōnai Station (咥内駅, Kōnai-eki) is a tram station in Kōchi, Kōchi Prefecture, Japan.

== Lines ==
- Tosa Electric Railway
  - Ino Line

== Adjacent stations ==
«	Service	»
Tosa Electric Railway
Ino Line
Miyano-oku	-	Ujidanchi-mae
