= Asahimachi-itchōme Station =

Tram station in Kōchi, Kōchi Prefecture, Japan

Asahimachi-itchōme 旭町一丁目駅
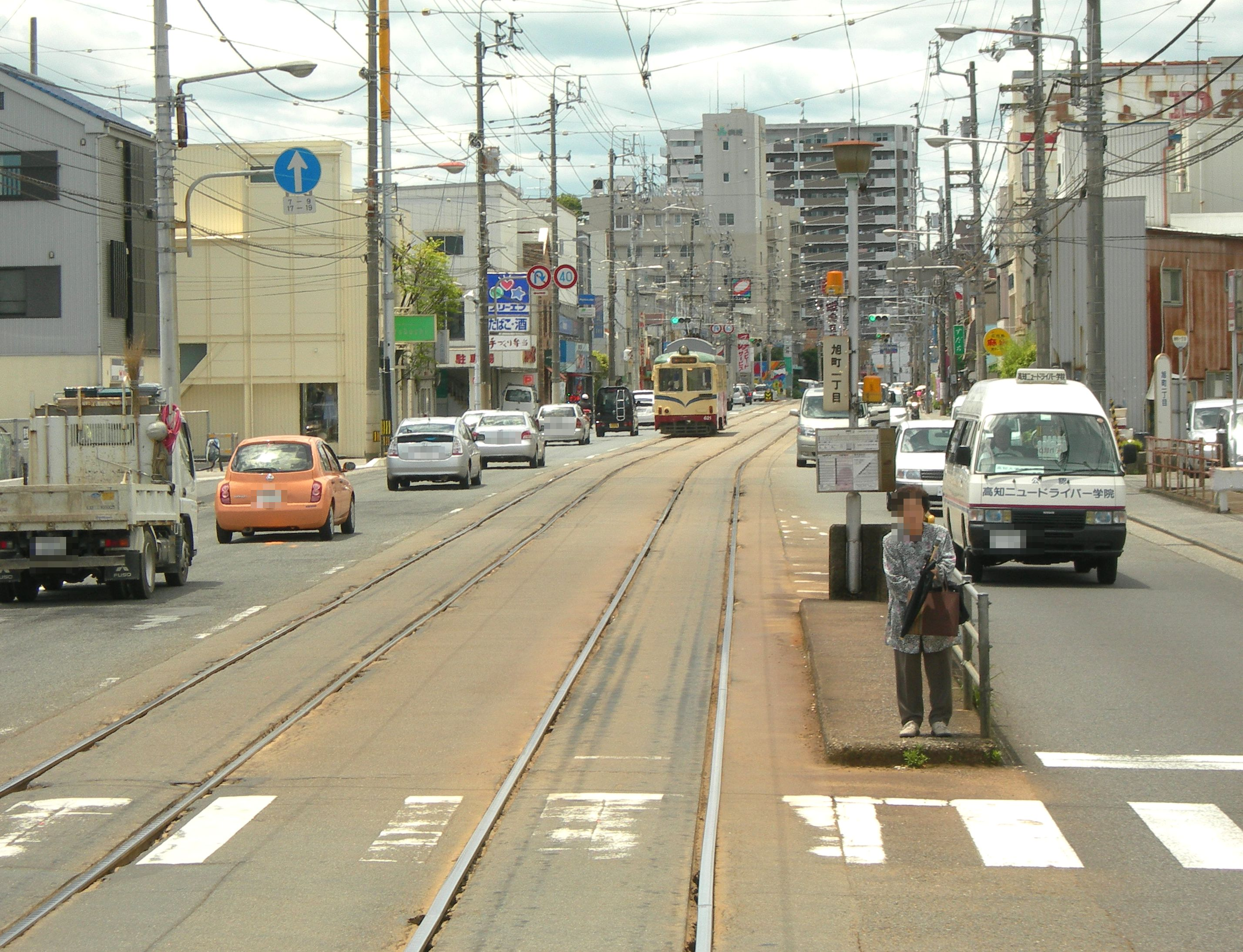

General information
- Location: Kōchi, Kōchi Prefecture; Japan
- Coordinates: 33.556708°N 133.513611°E
- System: tram stop
- Operator: Tosa Electric Railway
- Line: Ino Line

Services
Preceding station	Tosa Electric Railway	Following station
Kamimachi-gochōme	Ino Line	Asahi-ekimae-dōri
Location

Asahimachi-itchōme Station (旭町一丁目駅, Asahimachi-itchōme-eki) is a tram station in Kōchi, Kōchi Prefecture, Japan.

== Lines ==
- Tosa Electric Railway
  - Ino Line

== See also ==
- List of railway lines in Japan
