= Kamimachi-itchōme Station =

Tram station in Kōchi, Kōchi Prefecture, Japan

Coordinates: 33°33′26″N 133°31′30″E

Kamimachi-itchōme Station 上町一丁目停留場
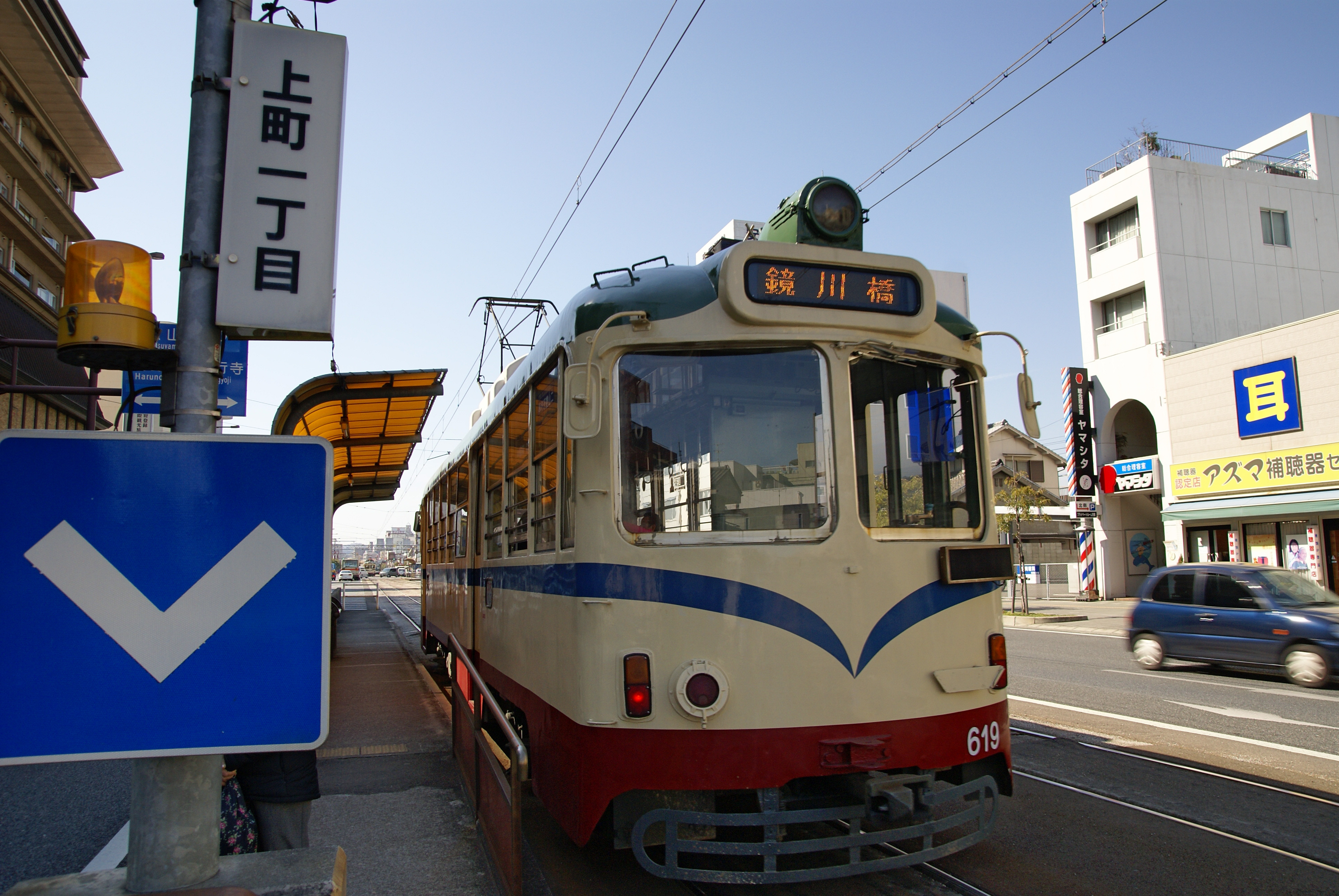
- Kamimachi-itchōme Station

General information
- Location: Kōchi; Japan
- Operator: Tosaden Kōtsū
- Line: Ino Line

History
- Opened: October 9, 1906
Location

Kamimachi-itchōme Station (上町一丁目停留場, Kamimachi-itchōme-teiryujō) is a tram station in Kōchi, Kōchi Prefecture, Japan. It is operated by Tosaden Kōtsū.

== History ==
The station opened in 1906 as Honchosuji-itchōme Station (本町筋一丁目停留場). In 1966, the station name was changed to the current one of Kamimachi-itchōme Station.

The station was once planned to be closed, but was kept in operation because of its proximity to Sakamoto Ryōma's birthplace and to the Kōchi Prefectural School for the Blind.

== Lines ==
- Tosaden Kōtsū
  - Ino Line

== Adjacent stations ==
«	Service	»
Tosa Electric Railway
Ino Line
Masugata	-	Kamimachi-nichōme

== Surrounding area ==
- Ryōma's Birthplace Memorial Museum
- Kagami River
- Japan National Route 33
