= DESUCA =

Contactless smart card system of Kōchi Prefecture, Japan

DESUCA Green Card commuter pass

DESUCA (ですか, Desuka) is a rechargeable contactless smart card ticketing system for public transport in Kōchi Prefecture, Japan, introduced from 25 January 2009. The card is issued by the DESUCA Company (株式会社ですか, Kabushiki gaisha Desuka), founded by Tosa Electric Railway (Tosaden) and Kōchiken Kōtsū. Following the restructuring of the two founder companies, the company is now an affiliate of Tosaden Kōtsū. The name stands for tram (電車, densha), bus (バス, basu) and card.

The card claims to work positive for the environment, as it would encourage using public transport, thus reducing carbon emission. A user is able to add its loyalty point by using the card, as well as by doing something "ecological", such as avoiding a disposable plastic bag at a store.

== Usable area ==
The card is usable for the following operators' lines:

- Tosaden Kōtsū tram and bus lines (including former Tosaden, Tosaden Dream Service and Kōchiken Kōtsū bus lines)
- Kenkō Hokubu Kōtsū (県交北部交通) bus lines
- Kōchi Kōryō Kōtsū (高知高陵交通) bus lines, between Susaki and Suginokawa or Yusuhara

The card also functions as an electronic money.

== Types of cards ==
- Corresponding different ages, the card is classified into the three different "colors":
  - Orange Card: For elementary school students, usable until April 1 of 12 years old.
  - Green Card: For 12 years old and older.
  - Purple Card: For 65 years old and older.
- Corresponding functions, the three cards are each classified into three, making the nine different cards in total:
  - Unregistered card
  - Registered card: Needs registration. The card can be reissued when lost.
  - Commuter pass: Needs registration.
