= Ryōma's Birthplace Memorial Museum =

Museum in Kōchi, Japan

- 高知市立龍馬の生まれたまち記念館
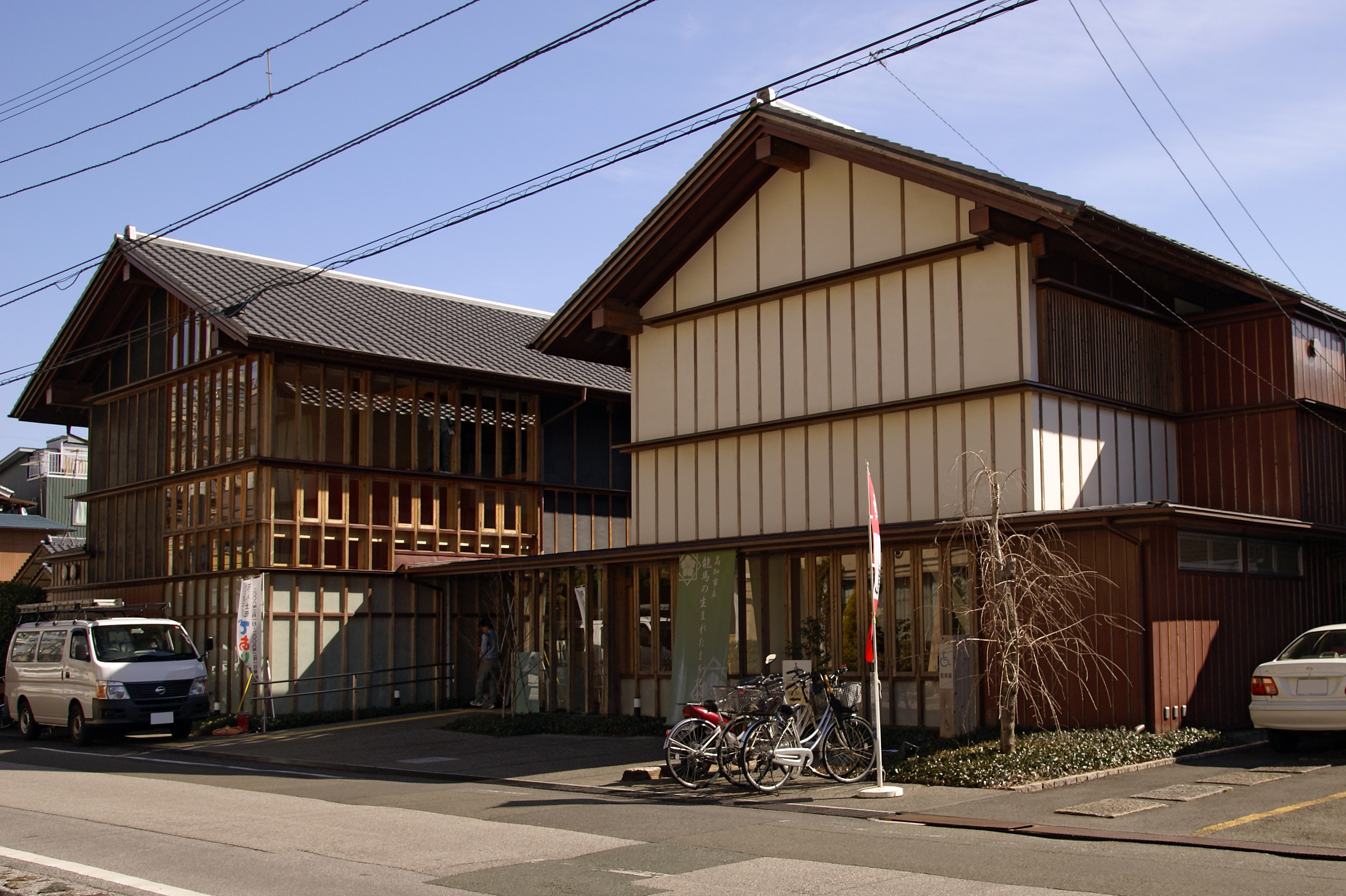
- Interactive map of the Ryōma's Birthplace Memorial Museum area

General information
- Location: 2-6-33 Kami-machi, Kōchi, Kōchi Prefecture, Japan
- Coordinates: 33°33′23″N 133°31′28″E
- Opened: March 2004

Website
- Official website

Ryōma's Birthplace Memorial Museum (高知市立龍馬の生まれたまち記念館, Kōchi Shiritsu Ryōma no Umareta Machi Kinenkan) opened in Kōchi, Kōchi Prefecture, Japan in 2004. It is dedicated to the life and times of Sakamoto Ryōma and to the local area of Kami-machi and Kōchi more generally during the Bakumatsu period.

== Access ==
The museum can be accessed on foot from the Kamimachi-itchōme tram station.

== See also ==
- Sakamoto Ryōma Memorial Museum
- Kōchi Castle Museum of History
- Kōchi Prefectural Museum of History
- The Museum of Art, Kōchi
- Kōchi Literary Museum
