= Tosaden Kōtsū Ino Line =

The Ino Line (伊野線, Ino-sen) is a tram line serving the island of Shikoku, Japan, in the city of Kōchi, Kōchi Prefecture, part of the Tosaden Kōtsū network.

== Operations ==
Trams operate roughly every 40 minutes to Ino Station and 8–16 times an hour to Kagamigawa between 6 a.m. and 10 p.m. Most tram services continue beyond the line with through service to the Tosaden Kōtsū Gomen Line. The combined line is nicknamed Tozai Line by the company.

Ino Line
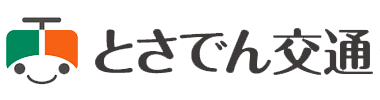

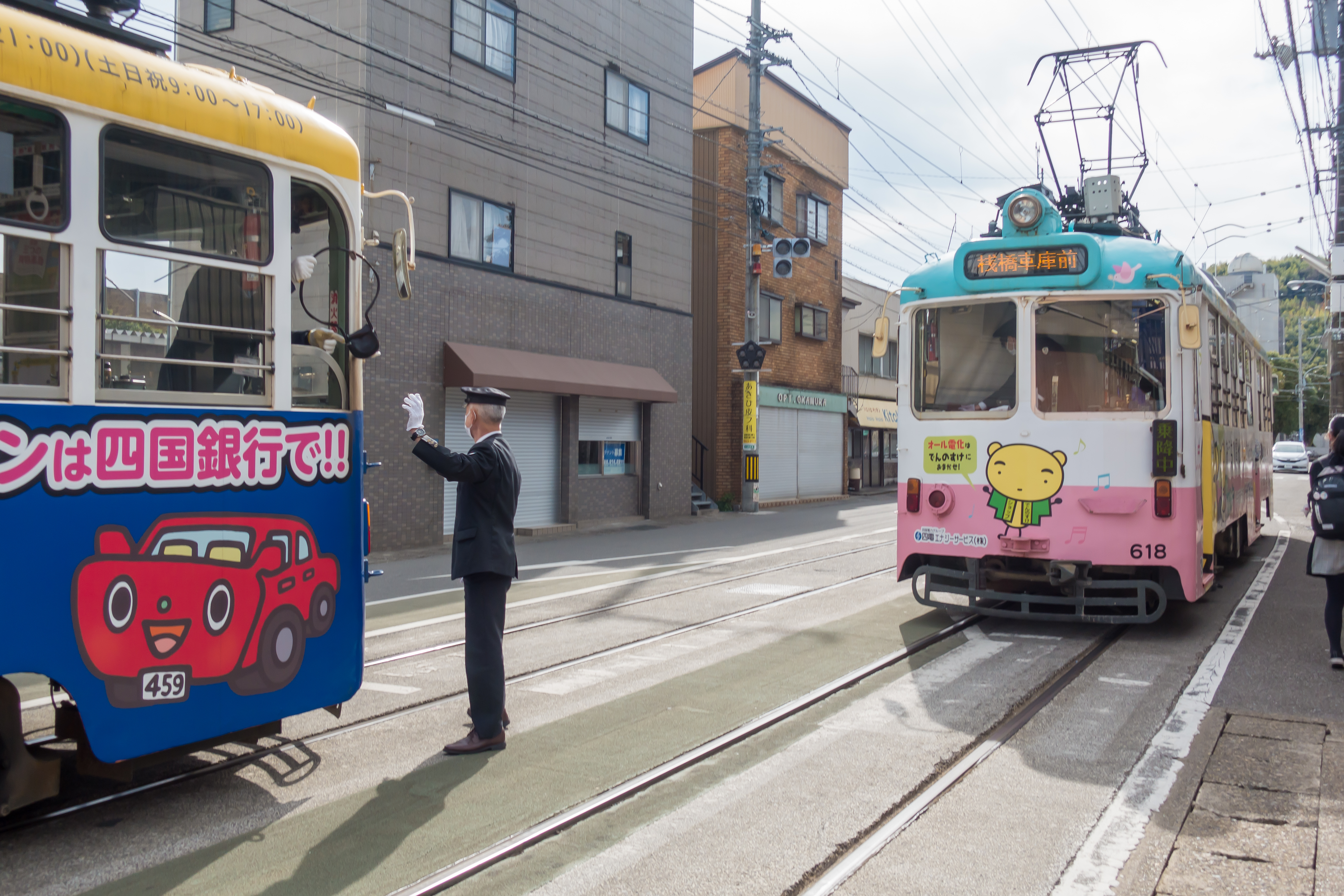

Overview
- Locale: Kōchi
- Termini: Harimayabashi; Ino
- Stations: 34
- Website: Tosaden Kōtsū

Service
- Operator: Tosaden Kōtsū

History
- Opened: May 2, 1904

Technical
- Line length: 11.2 Km
- Track gauge: 1,067 mm (3 ft 6 in)
- Electrification: 600 V DC overhead

== Stations ==
Name		Distance (km)	Connections	Location	
Harimayabashi	はりまや橋	0.0	Tosaden Kōtsū: Gomen Line, Sanbashi Line	Kōchi	Kōchi
Horizume	堀詰	0.3		Kōchi	Kōchi
Ōhashidōri	大橋通	0.6		Kōchi	Kōchi
Kōchijō-mae	高知城前	0.8		Kōchi	Kōchi
Kenchō-mae	県庁前	1.0		Kōchi	Kōchi
Gurando-dōri	グランド通	1.3		Kōchi	Kōchi
Masugata	枡形	1.5		Kōchi	Kōchi
Kamimachi-itchōme	上町一丁目	1.7		Kōchi	Kōchi
Kamimachi-nichōme	上町二丁目	1.9		Kōchi	Kōchi
Kamimachi-yonchōme	上町四丁目	2.2		Kōchi	Kōchi
Kamimachi-gochōme	上町五丁目	2.4		Kōchi	Kōchi
Asahimachi-itchōme	旭町一丁目	2.8		Kōchi	Kōchi
Asahi-ekimae-dōri	旭駅前通	3.1	JR Shikoku: Dosan Line (Asahi)	Kōchi	Kōchi
Asahimachi-sanchōme	旭町三丁目	3.4		Kōchi	Kōchi
Hotarubashi	蛍橋	3.7		Kōchi	Kōchi
Kagamigawabashi	鏡川橋	4.2	JR Shikoku: Dosan Line (Kōchi-Shōgyo-Mae)	Kōchi	Kōchi
Kamobe	鴨部	4.7		Kōchi	Kōchi
Akebonochō-higashimachi	曙町東町	5.1		Kōchi	Kōchi
Akebonochō	曙町	5.4		Kōchi	Kōchi
Asakura	朝倉	5.6		Kōchi	Kōchi
Asakura-ekimae	朝倉駅前	5.8	JR Shikoku: Dosan Line (Asakura)	Kōchi	Kōchi
Asakurajinja-mae	朝倉神社前	6.3		Kōchi	Kōchi
Miyano-oku	宮の奥	6.8		Kōchi	Kōchi
Kōnai	咥内	7.3		Kōchi	Kōchi
Ujidanchi-mae	宇治団地前	8.2		Ino, Agawa District	Kōchi
Yashiro-dōri	八代通	8.6		Ino, Agawa District	Kōchi
Nakayama	中山	8.9		Ino, Agawa District	Kōchi
Edagawa	枝川	9.2	JR Shikoku: Dosan Line	Ino, Agawa District	Kōchi
Inoshō-mae	伊野商業前	9.8		Ino, Agawa District	Kōchi
Kitauchi	北内	9.9		Ino, Agawa District	Kōchi
Kitayama	北山	10.3		Ino, Agawa District	Kōchi
Narutani	鳴谷	10.8		Ino, Agawa District	Kōchi
Ino-ekimae	伊野駅前	11.0	JR Shikoku: Dosan Line (Ino)	Ino, Agawa District	Kōchi
Ino	伊野	11.2		Ino, Agawa District	Kōchi
