= Kitayama Station (Kōchi) =

Tram station in Ino, Kōchi Prefecture, Japan

Coordinates: 33°32′58″N 133°26′19″E

Kitayama Station 北山駅
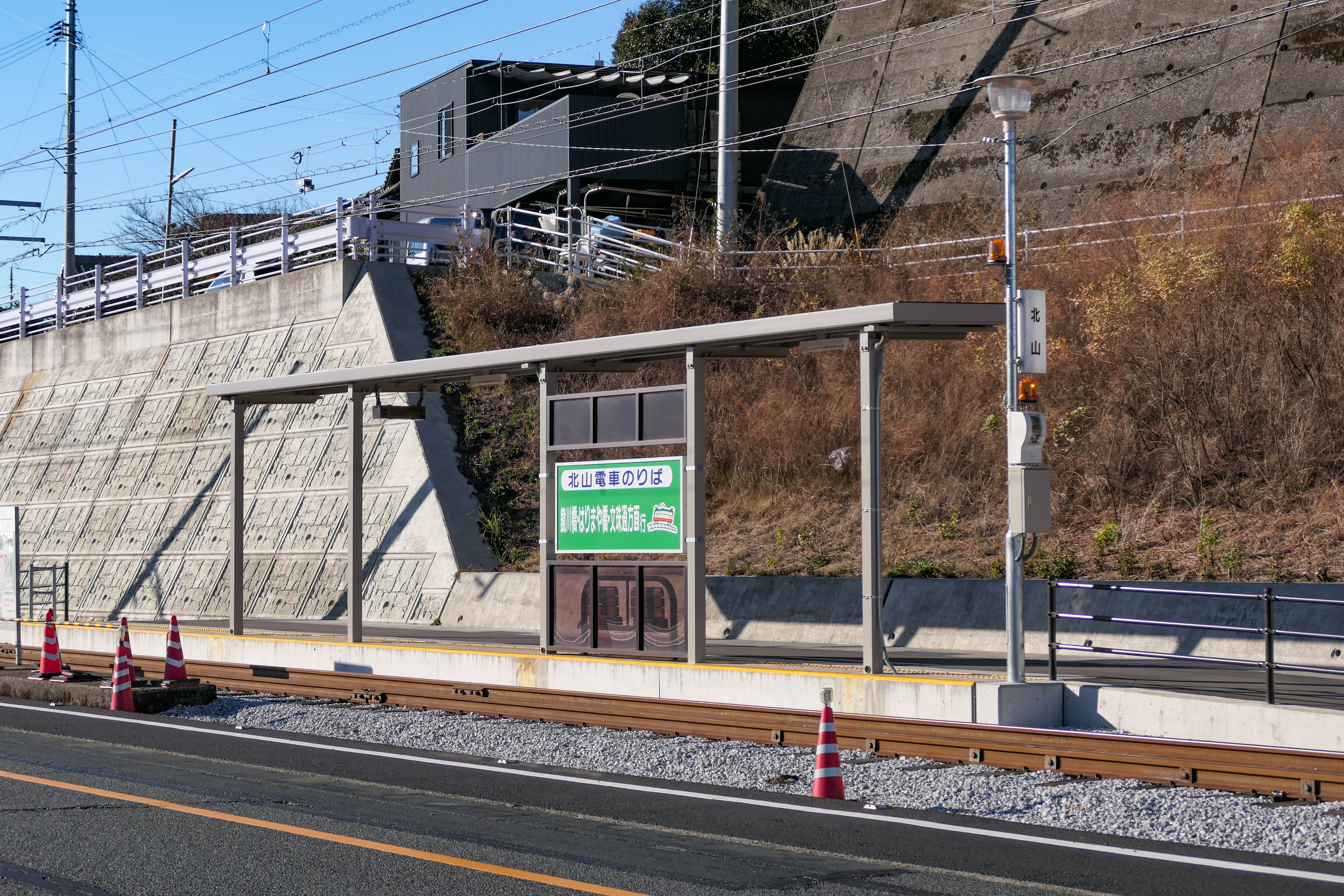

General information
- Location: Ino, Agawa District, Kōchi Prefecture; Japan
- Operated by: Tosa Electric Railway
- Line: Ino Line
Location

Kitayama Station (北山駅, Kitayama-eki) is a tram station in Ino, Agawa District, Kōchi Prefecture, Japan.

== Lines ==
- Tosa Electric Railway
  - Ino Line

== Adjacent stations ==
«	Service	»
Tosa Electric Railway
Ino Line
Kitauchi	-	Narutani
