= Asakura Station (Tosaden) =

Tram station in Kōchi, Kōchi Prefecture, Japan

Asakura 朝倉駅
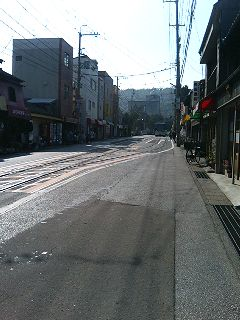
- Station without platform

General information
- Location: Kōchi, Kōchi Prefecture; Japan
- Coordinates: 33°33′03″N 133°29′18″E
- System: tram station
- Operator: Tosa Electric Railway
- Line: Ino Line
Location

Asakura Station (朝倉駅, Asakura-eki) is a tram station in Kōchi, Kōchi Prefecture, Japan.

== Lines ==
- Tosa Electric Railway
  - Ino Line

== Adjacent stations ==
«	Service	»
Tosa Electric Railway
Ino Line
Akebonochō	-	Asakura-ekimae
