= Tosaden Kōtsū Sanbashi Line =

Tramway line in Kōchi, Kochi Prefecture, Japan

Sanbashi Line
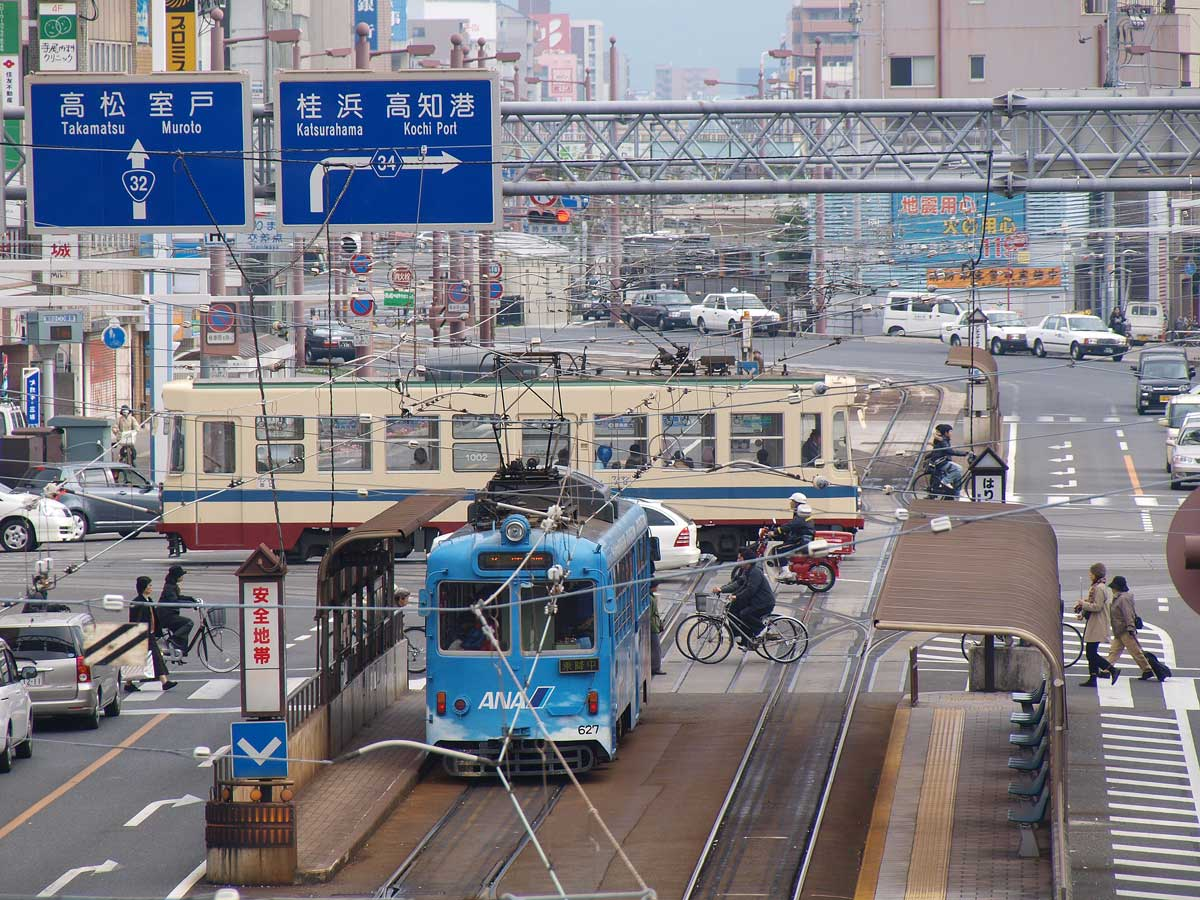

Overview
- Native name: 桟橋線
- Termini: Kōchi-ekimae; Sanbashi-dōri-gochōme
- Stations: 11
- Website: https://www.tosaden.co.jp/

Service
- Type: Tram

History
- Opened: 1904-05-02

Technical
- Line length: 3.2 km (2.0 mi)
- Track gauge: 1,067 mm (3 ft 6 in)

The Sanbashi Line (桟橋線, Sanbashi-sen; lit. Pier line) is a tram line serving the city of Kōchi, Kōchi Prefecture, on the island of Shikoku, Japan. The tram line is part of the Tosaden Kōtsū network.

The line name "Sanbashi Line" sometimes denotes only the section between Harimayabashi and Sanbashi-dōri-gochōme. In this case, the rest of the line, between Kōchi-Ekimae and Harimayabashi, is called the Ekimae Line (駅前線, Ekimae-sen).

From its establishment up until September 30, 2014, it was operated by Tosa Electric Railway (土佐電気鉄道, Tosa Denki Tetsudō), but from October 1, 2014, the newly formed Tosaden Kōtsū company took over operation.

== Stations ==
The line has 11 stations.

| Name | | Distance (km) | Connections | Location | |
|---|---|---|---|---|---|
| Kōchi-ekimae | 高知駅前 | 0.0 | Kōchi railway station | 33°34′00″N 133°32′37″E | Kōchi |
| Kōchibashi | 高知橋 | 0.3 | | 33°33′51″N 133°32′36″E | Kōchi |
| Hasuikemachi-dōri | 蓮池町通 | 0.5 | | 33°33′44″N 133°32′35″E | Kōchi |
| Harimayabashi | はりまや橋 | 0.8 | Tosaden Kōtsū: Gomen Line, Ino Line | 33°33′33″N 133°32′34″E | Kōchi |
| Umenotsuji | 梅の辻 | 1.4 | | 33°33′14″N 133°32′38″E | Kōchi |
| Sanbashi-dōri-itchōme | 桟橋通一丁目 | 1.9 | | 33°33′02″N 133°32′45″E | Kōchi |
| Sanbashi-dōri-nichōme | 桟橋通二丁目 | 2.1 | | 33°32′57″N 133°32′49″E | Kōchi |
| Sanbashi-dōri-sanchōme | 桟橋通三丁目 | 2.4 | | 33°32′48″N 133°32′55″E | Kōchi |
| Sanbashi-dōri-yonchōme | 桟橋通四丁目 | 2.6 | | 33°32′40″N 133°33′00″E | Kōchi |
| Sanbashi-shako-mae | 桟橋車庫前 | 3.0 | | 33°32′30″N 133°33′07″E | Kōchi |
| Sanbashi-dōri-gochōme | 桟橋通五丁目 | 3.2 | | 33°32′26″N 133°33′10″E | Kōchi |
