= Tosaden Kōtsū =

Japanese transportation company

Tosaden Kōtsū とさでん交通
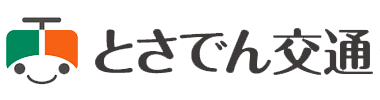
- Type: Third-sector railway
- Predecessor: Tosa Electric Railway; Tosaden Dream Service; Kōchiken Kōtsū
- Founded: 1 October 2014; 11 years ago in Kōchi, Kōchi Prefecture, Japan
- Headquarters: Kōchi, Kōchi Prefecture, Japan
- Website: Official website

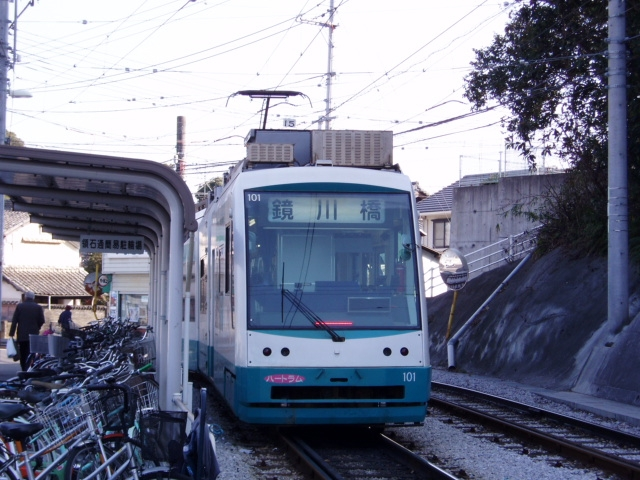
Type 100 tramcar, known as "Heartram"

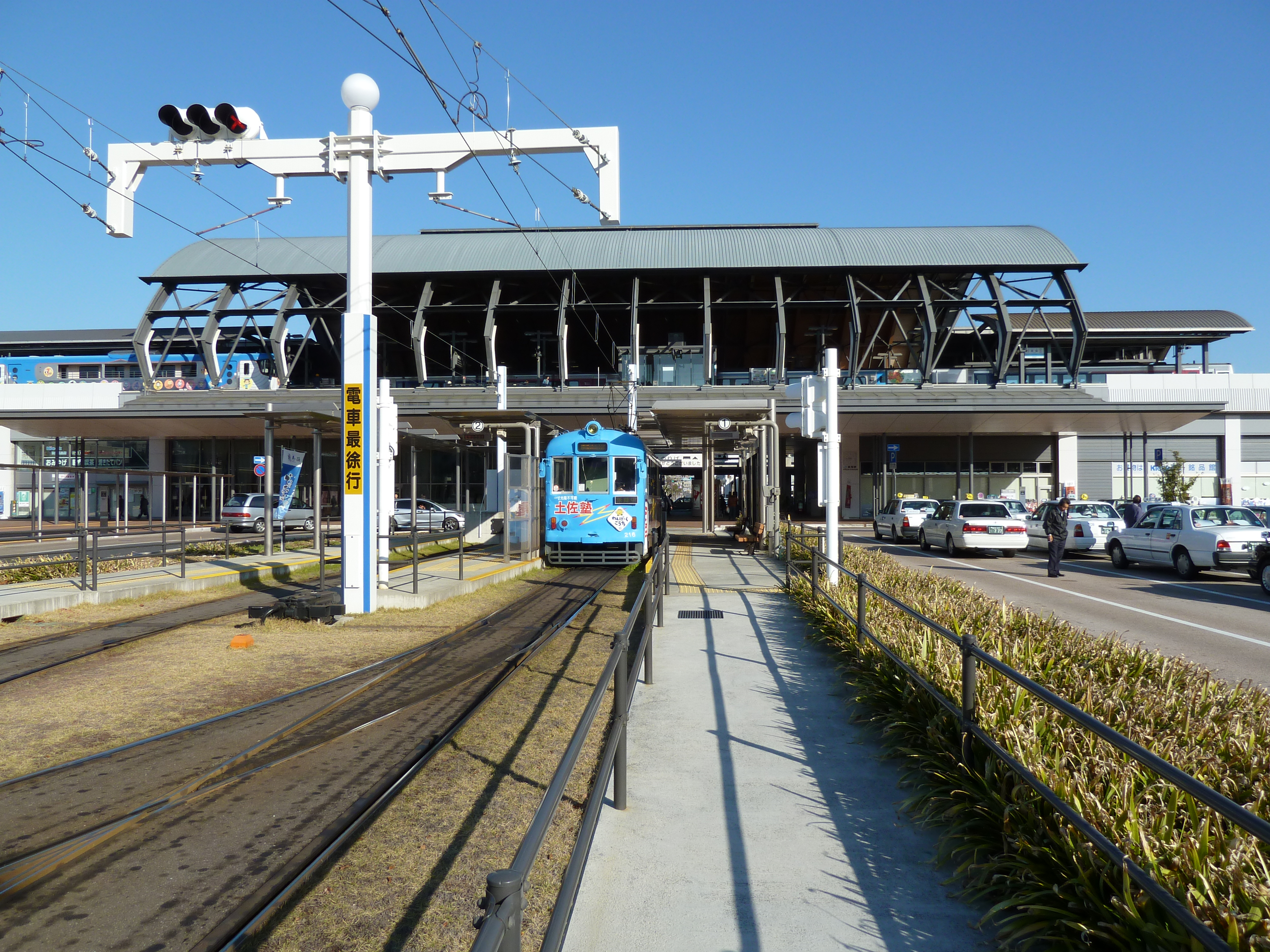
Kōchi-Ekimae Station

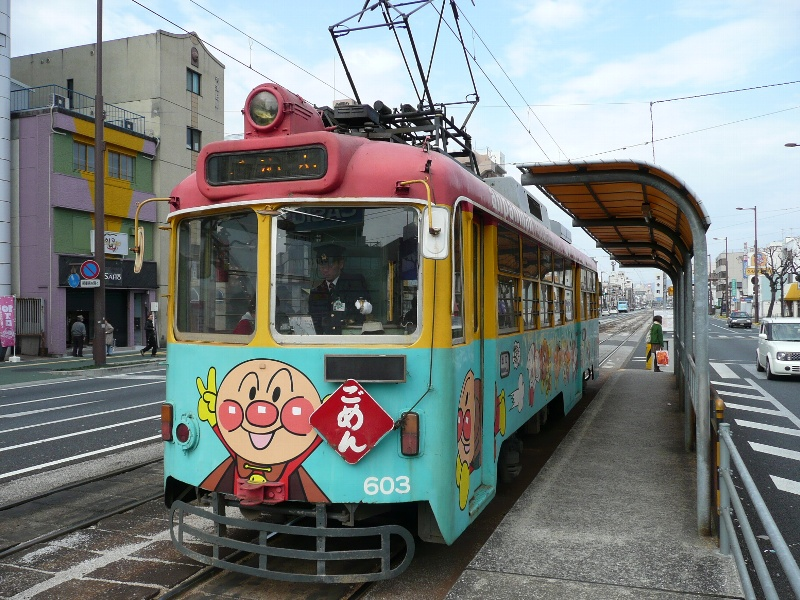
Anpanman tram

Tosaden Kōtsū (とさでん交通), sometimes rendered in English as Tosaden Traffic, is a transportation company in Kōchi, Japan. The third-sector company operates tram and bus lines.

The company was established on 1 October 2014 by merging Tosa Electric Railway (土佐電気鉄道, Tosa Denki Tetsudō), a tram and bus company, with the bus operators Tosaden Dream Service (土佐電ドリームサービス) and Kōchiken Kōtsū (高知県交通), the former of which was a subsidiary of the Tosa Electric Railway.

== History ==
Tosa Electric Railway was founded on 8 July 1903, and the tram line was opened on 2 May 1904. The company also operated a heavy railway line called Aki Line (安芸線) until its closure in 1974. The company was commonly known as Toden (土電) among locals, while people in other prefectures tend to call it Tosaden (土佐電), as the word Toden can be confusing with Tokyo Metropolitan Tramway, which was commonly called Toden (都電).

Tosa Electric Railway and Kōchiken Kōtsū introduced DESUCA, a smart card (IC card) ticket system, in January 2009.

In June 2014, the shareholders of Tosa Electric Railway and Kōchiken Kōtsū, both in the state of insolvency, approved the reconstruction plan, under which the companies' businesses be transferred to the newly established company funded by Kōchi Prefecture and other 12 municipalities. The name of the company was selected from 1,235 proposals from the public.

== Tram lines ==
There are three lines with 76 stations, covering a total distance of 25.3 km. It is the second longest tram network in Japan, after Hiroshima Electric Railway. The network in Kōchi, however, has suffered from declining ridership since the 1960s. In an attempt to reverse this trend, the company has tried introducing newly built stations and cars, but has not seen much success. The Government of Kōchi Prefecture, as well as that of Kōchi City are considering plans to support the company.

=== Lines ===
- Sanbashi Line: Kōchi-Ekimae — Harimayabashi — Sambashidōri-Gochōme
- Ino Line: Harimayabashi — Ino
  - Most tramcars directly continue to Gomen Line.
- Gomen Line: Harimayabashi — Gomenmachi
  - Most tramcars directly continue to Ino Line.

=== Connections ===
- Asahi-Ekimaedōri Station: JR Shikoku Dosan Line (Asahi)
- Asakura-Ekimae Station: Dosan Line (Asakura)
- Edagawa Station: Dosan Line
- Gomenmachi Station: Tosa Kuroshio Railway Asa Line
- Ino-Ekimae Station: Dosan Line (Ino)
- Kōchi-Ekimae Station: Dosan Line (Kōchi)

== Bus lines ==
The company operates long-distance buses linking Kōchi City and major cities of Japan, including Tokyo, Nagoya, Osaka, Hiroshima, and Fukuoka. It also operates a local network in/around the city.

== See also ==
- List of light-rail transit systems
- Little Dancer, one of the LRVs operated on its lines
