= Ino Station (JR Shikoku) =

Railway station in Ino, Kōchi Prefecture, Japan

Ino Station 伊野駅
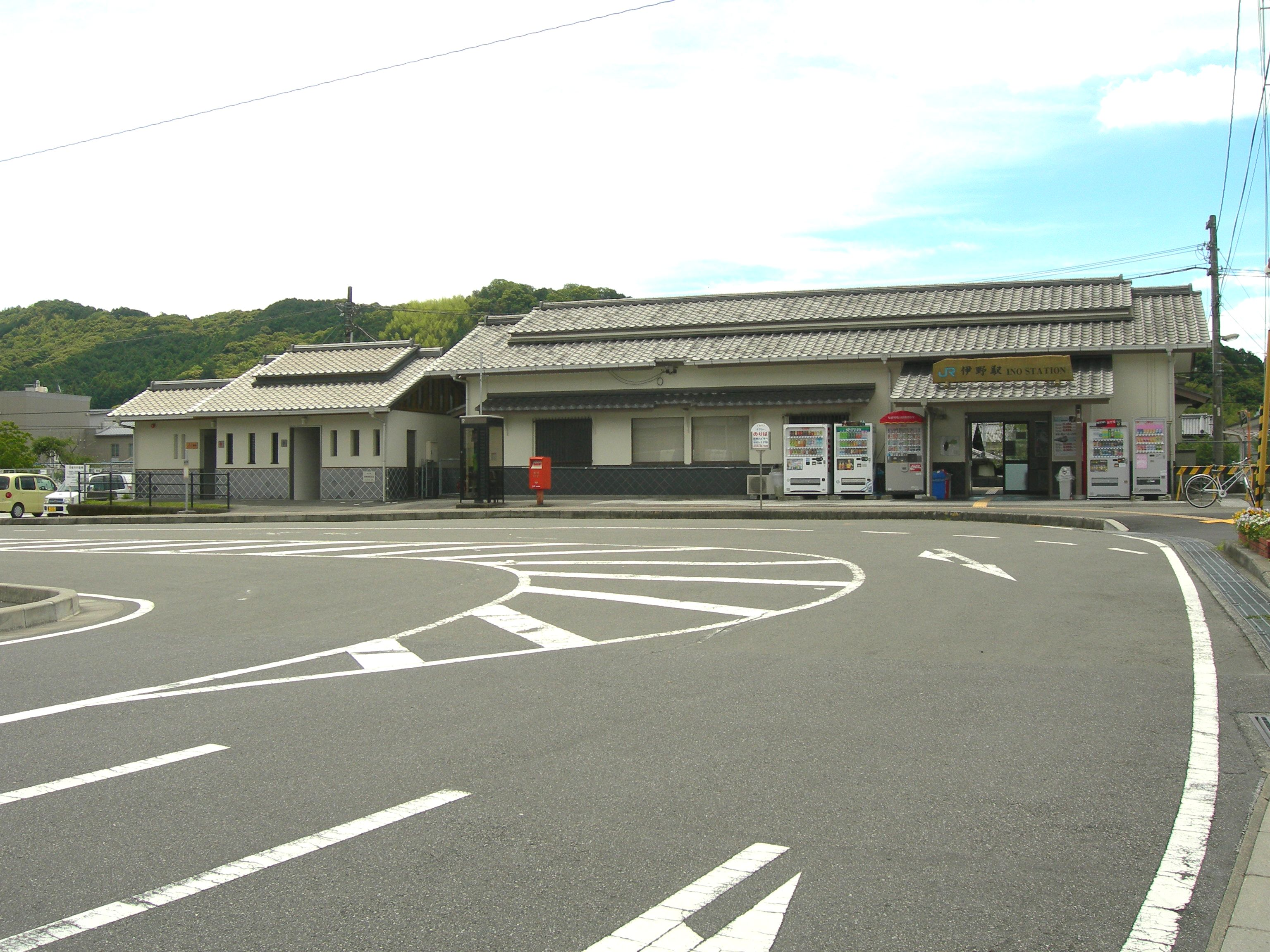
- Ino Station in 2010

General information
- Location: Hane, Ino, Agawa-gun, Kōchi-ken 781-2110; Japan
- Coordinates: 33°32′51″N 133°25′48″E
- Operator: JR Shikoku
- Line: ■ Dosan Line
- Distance: 138.0 km from Tadotsu
- Platforms: 1 side + 1 island platforms
- Tracks: 3 + 1 passing siding
- Connections: Tosaden Kōtsū tramstop

Construction
- Parking: Available
- Cycle facilities: Bike shed
- Accessible: Yes - platforms are connected by ramps and a level crossing

Other information
- Status: JR ticket window
- Station code: K07

History
- Opened: 15 November 1924

Passengers
- FY2019: 937
Location
- Location within Kochi Prefecture Location within Japan

Ino Station (伊野駅, Ino-eki) is a passenger railway station located in the town of Ino, Agawa District, Kōchi Prefecture, Japan. It is operated by JR Shikoku and has the station number "K07".

== Lines ==
The station is served by JR Shikoku's Dosan Line and is located 138.0 km from the beginning of the line at Tadotsu.

In addition to the local trains of the Dosan Line, the following limited express services also stop at Ino Station:

- Nanpū - Okayama to Kōchi, Nakamura and Sukumo
- Shimanto - Takamatsu to Kōchi, Nakamura and Sukumo
- Ashizuri - Kōchi to Nakamura and Sukumo

== Layout ==
The station consists of a side platform and an island platform serving three tracks. A waiting room and JR ticket window are located inside the station building which is connected to the platform serving line 1. Ramps and a level crossing give access to the island platform serving lines 2 and 3. A passing siding is located beyond line 3. A bike shed and parking lots are located outside the station.

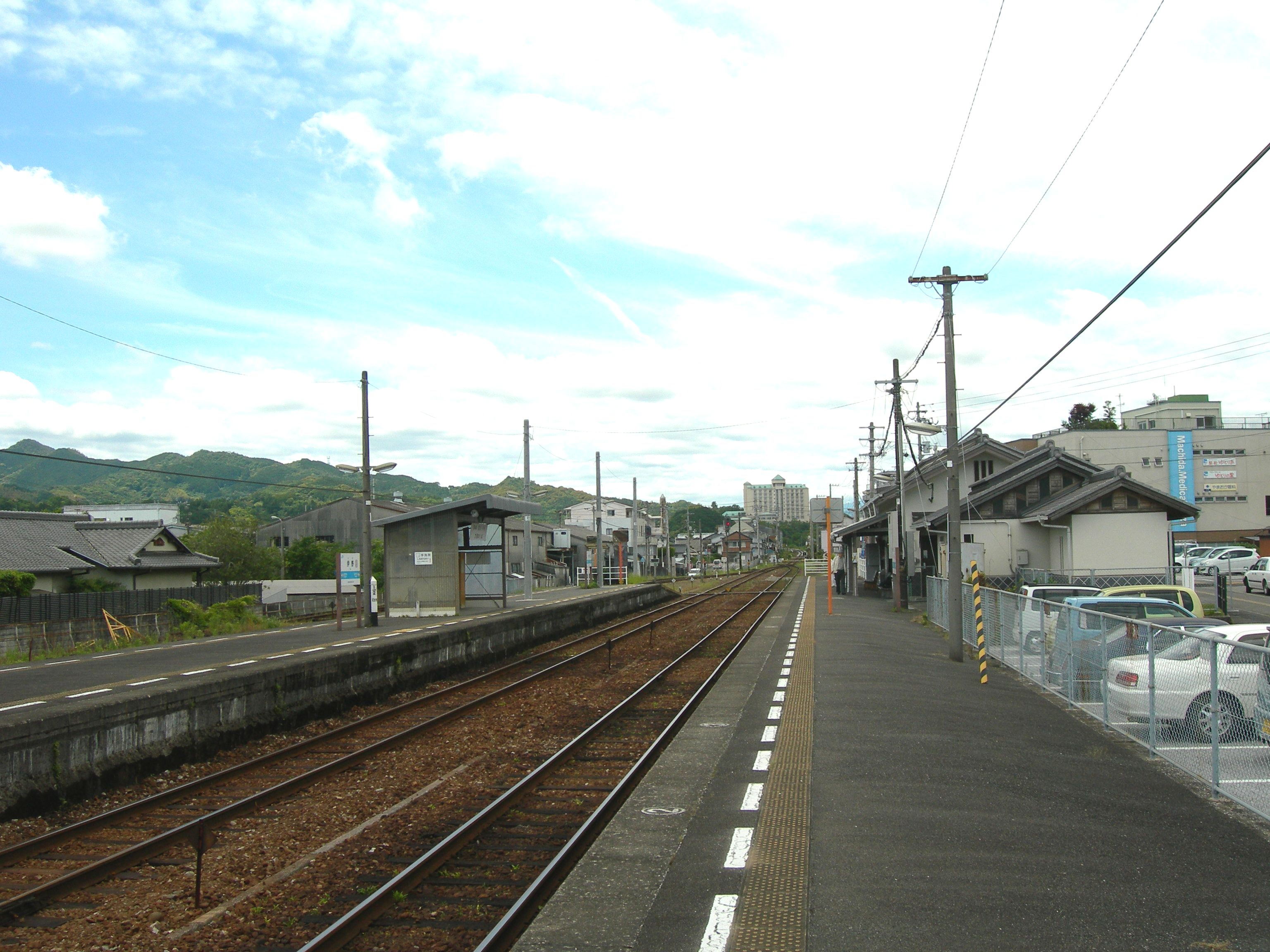
View of the station platforms in 2010 looking in the direction of Kubokawa

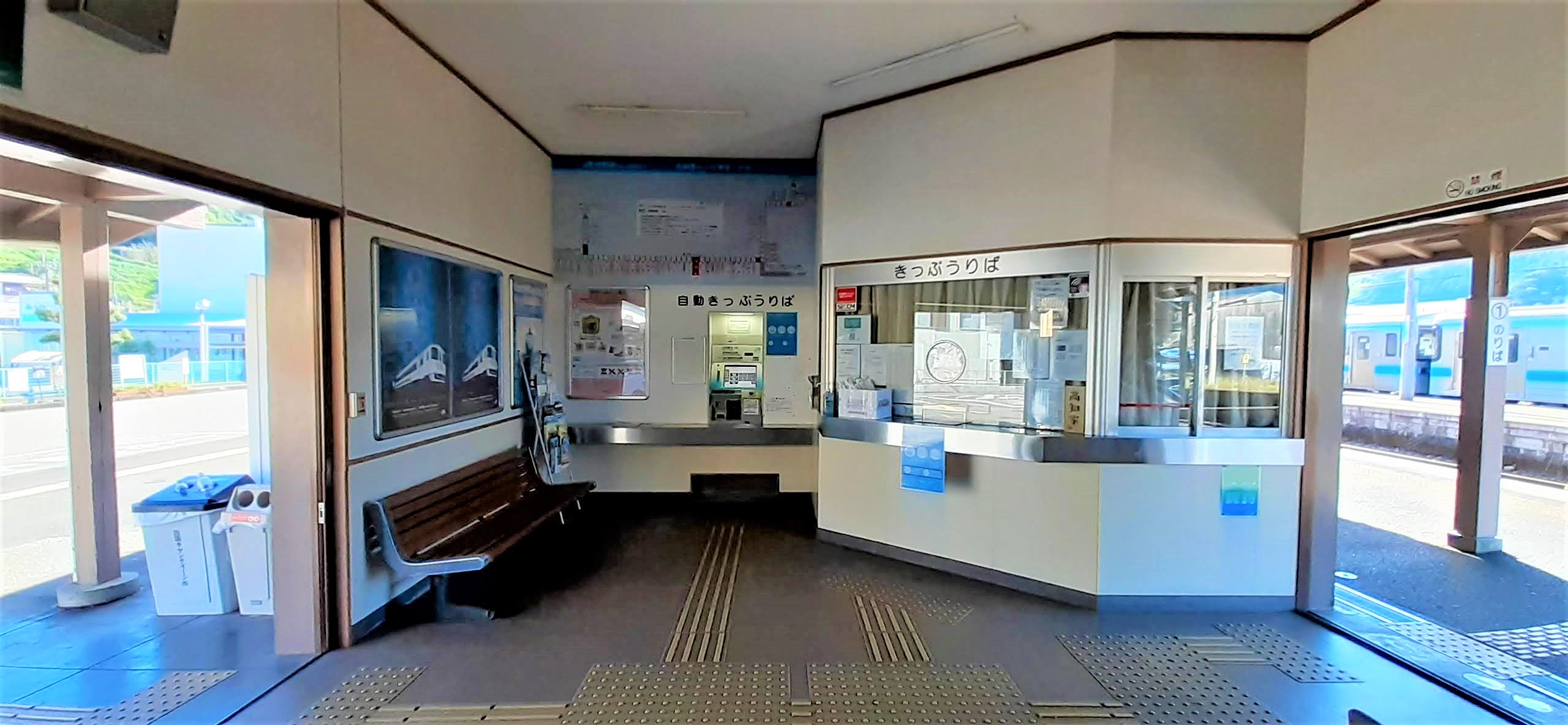
Ino Station interior in 2021

== Adjacent stations ==
«	Service	»
JR Limited Express Services
Asakura	Nanpū	Sakawa
Asakura	Shimanto	Sakawa
Asakura	Ashizuri	Sakawa
Dosan Line
Edagawa	Local	Hakawa

== History ==
The station opened on 15 November 1924 as an intermediate stop when the then Kōchi Line (later renamed the Dosan Line) was extended eastwards from Kusaka to Kōchi. At this time the station was operated by Japanese Government Railways, later becoming Japanese National Railways (JNR). With the privatization of JNR on 1 April 1987, control of the station passed to JR Shikoku.

== Connections ==
Ino-ekimae Station (伊野駅前駅, Ino-ekimae-eki), a tramstop on the Ino Line (伊野線, Ino-sen) operated by Tosaden Kōtsū (とさでん交通), is located 100 metres from the station.

== Surrounding area ==
- Japan National Route 33
- Ino Town Hall

== See also ==
- List of railway stations in Japan
