= Asahi Station (Kōchi) =

Railway station in Kōchi, Japan

Asahi Station 旭駅
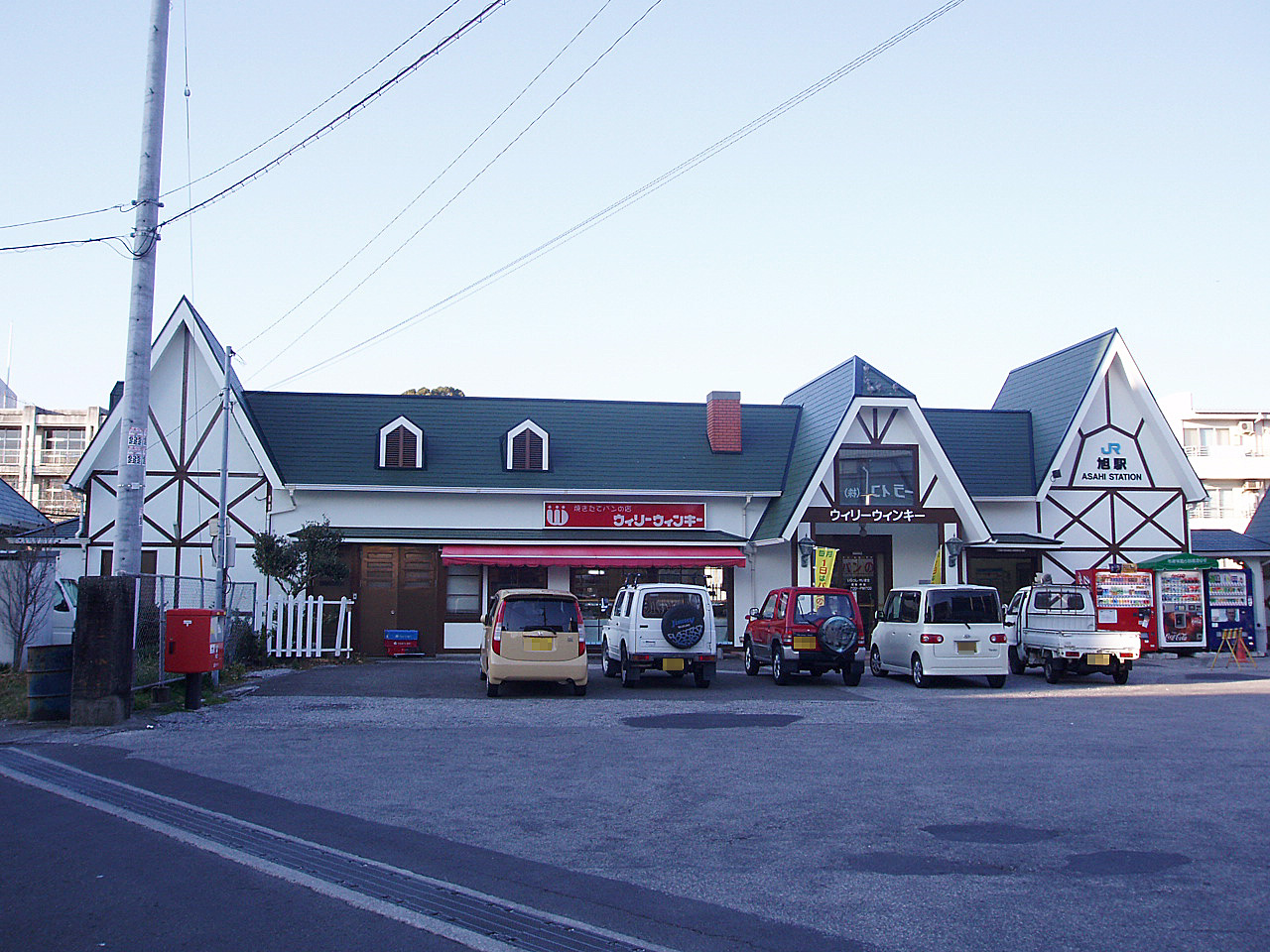
- Asahi Station in 2006

General information
- Location: Asahiekimaecho, Kōchi-shi, Kōchi-ken 780-0938; Japan
- Coordinates: 33°33′32″N 133°30′32″E
- Operator: JR Shikoku
- Line: ■ Dosan Line
- Distance: 130.2 km from Tadotsu
- Platforms: 2 side platforms
- Tracks: 2
- Connections: Tosaden Kōtsū tramstop

Construction
- Parking: Available
- Accessible: No - platforms linked by footbridge

Other information
- Status: Staffed - JR ticket window (no Midori no Madoguchi)
- Station code: K03

History
- Opened: 15 November 1924

Passengers
- FY2019: 1372
Location
- Location within Kochi Prefecture Location within Japan

Asahi Station (旭駅, Asahi-eki) is a passenger railway station located in the city of Kōchi, the capital of Kōchi Prefecture, Japan. It is operated by JR Shikoku and has the station number "K03".

== Lines ==
The station is served by JR Shikoku's Dosan Line and is located 130.2 km from the beginning of the line at Tadotsu.

In addition to the local trains of the Dosan Line, the following limited express services also stop at Ino Station:

- Nanpū - Okayama to Kōchi, Nakamura and Sukumo
- Shimanto - Takamatsu to Kōchi, Nakamura and Sukumo
- Ashizuri - Kōchi to Nakamura and Sukumo

== Layout ==
The station consists of two opposed side platforms serving two tracks. A mock-Tudor style station building connected to platform 1 houses a waiting room and JR ticket window (without Midori no Madoguchi facilities). Access to platform 2 is by a footbridge.

== Adjacent stations ==
«	Service	»
JR Limited Express Services
Kōchi	Nanpū	Asakura
Kōchi	Shimanto	Asakura
Kōchi	Ashizuri	Asakura
Dosan Line
Engyōjiguchi	Local	Kōchi-Shōgyo-Mae

== History ==
The station opened on 15 November 1924 as an intermediate stop when the then Kōchi Line (later renamed the Dosan Line) was extended eastwards from Kusaka to Kōchi. At this time the station was operated by Japanese Government Railways, later becoming Japanese National Railways (JNR). With the privatization of JNR on 1 April 1987, control of the station passed to JR Shikoku.

== Connections ==
Asahi-ekimae-dōri Station (旭駅前通駅, Asahi-ekimae-dōri-eki), a tramstop on the Ino Line (伊野線, Ino-sen) operated by Tosaden Kōtsū (とさでん交通), is located about 300 metres from the station.

== Surrounding area ==
- Kochi Gakuen Junior College
- Kochi Municipal Kyokuhigashi Elementary School

== See also ==
- List of railway stations in Japan
