= Asakura Station (JR Shikoku) =

Railway station in Kōchi, Japan

Asakura Station 朝倉駅
- Asakura Station in 2026

General information
- Location: 133 Hei, Asakura, Kōchi-shi, Kōchi-ken 780-0000; Japan
- Coordinates: 33°33′06″N 133°29′08″E
- Operator: JR Shikoku
- Line: ■ Dosan Line
- Distance: 132.7 km from Tadotsu
- Platforms: 2 side platforms
- Tracks: 2 + 1 siding
- Connections: Tosaden Kōtsū tramstop

Construction
- Parking: Available
- Accessible: Yes - platforms linked by ramps and level crossing

Other information
- Status: Staffed - JR ticket window (Midori no Madoguchi)
- Station code: K05
- Website: Official website

History
- Opened: 15 November 1924

Passengers
- FY2023: 885
Location
- Location within Kochi Prefecture Location within Japan

Asakura Station (朝倉駅, Asakura-eki) is a passenger railway station located in the Asakura neighborhood of the city of Kōchi, the capital of Kōchi Prefecture, Japan. It is operated by JR Shikoku and has the station number "K05".

== Lines ==
The station is served by JR Shikoku's Dosan Line and is located 132.7 km from the beginning of the line at Tadotsu.

In addition to the local trains of the Dosan Line, the following limited express services also stop at Asakura Station:

- Nanpū - Okayama to Kōchi, Nakamura and Sukumo
- Shimanto - Takamatsu to Kōchi, Nakamura and Sukumo
- Ashizuri - Kōchi to Nakamura and Sukumo

== Layout ==
The station consists of two opposed side platforms serving two tracks. A log-style station building connected to platform 1 houses a waiting room and JR ticket window with Midori no Madoguchi facilities. Access to platform 2 is by a level crossing and ramps. A short siding juts partially into the other side of platform 1. Parking lots are located outside the station.

View of the station platforms in 2026

== Adjacent stations ==
«	Service	»
JR Limited Express Services
Asahi	Nanpū	Ino
Asahi	Shimanto	Ino
Asahi	Ashizuri	Ino
Dosan Line
Kōchi-Shōgyō-Mae	Local	Edagawa

== History ==
The station opened on 15 November 1924 as an intermediate stop when the then Kōchi Line (later renamed the Dosan Line) was extended eastwards from Kusaka to Kōchi. At this time the station was operated by Japanese Government Railways, later becoming Japanese National Railways (JNR). With the privatization of JNR on 1 April 1987, control of the station passed to JR Shikoku.

== Connections ==
Asakura-ekimae Station (朝倉駅前駅, Asakura-ekimae-eki), a tramstop on the Ino Line (伊野線, Ino-sen) operated by Tosaden Kōtsū (とさでん交通), is located less than 100 metres from the station.

== Surrounding area ==
- Asakura campus of Kōchi University

== See also ==
- List of railway stations in Japan
