= Azōno Station =

Railway station in Kōchi, Japan

Azōno Station 薊野駅
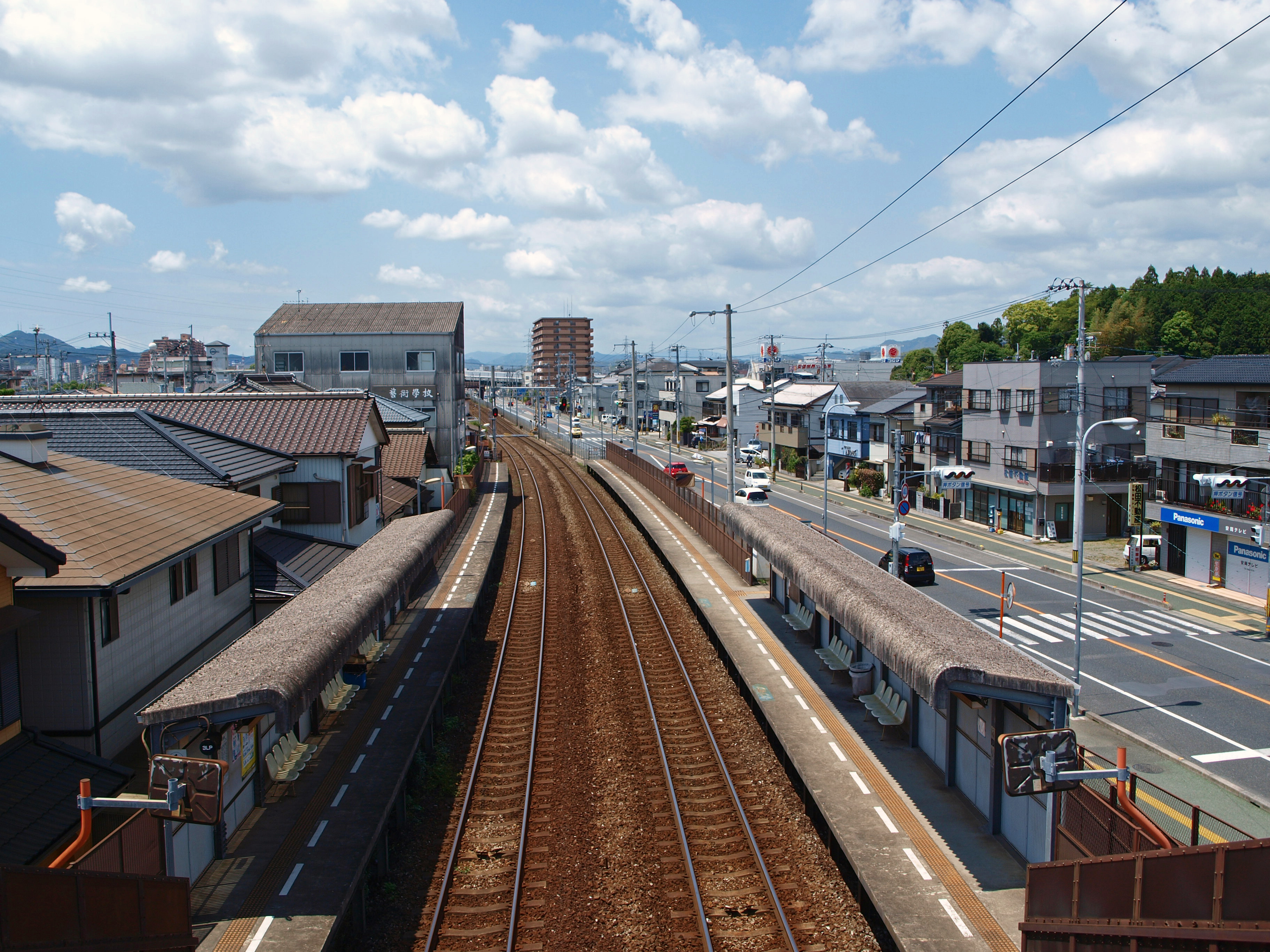
- Platforms seen from an overpass of the station in 2010

General information
- Location: 34 Azōno Nakamachi, Kōchi-shi, Kōchi-ken 781-0013; Japan
- Coordinates: 33°34′43″N 133°33′36″E
- Operator: JR Shikoku
- Line: ■ Dosan Line ■ Asa Line
- Distance: 124.4 km from Tadotsu
- Platforms: 2 side platforms
- Tracks: 2

Construction
- Structure type: Elevated
- Accessible: No - platforms are linked by a footbridge

Other information
- Status: Unstaffed
- Station code: D44

History
- Opened: 15 April 1952

Passengers
- FY2019: 368
Location
- Location within Kochi Prefecture Location within Japan

Azōno Station (薊野駅, Azōno-eki) is a junction passenger railway station located in the city of Kōchi city, the capital of Kōchi Prefecture, Japan. It is operated by JR Shikoku and has the station number "D44".

== Lines ==
The station is served by the JR Shikoku Dosan Line and is located 124.4 km from the beginning of the line at Tadotsu.

Although Gomen is the official western terminus of the third-sector Tosa Kuroshio Railway Asa Line (also known as the Gomen-Nahari Line), all its rapid and some local trains continue towards Kōchi on the Dosan Line tracks with Azōno as one of their intermediate stops.

== Layout ==
The station, which is unstaffed, consists of two opposed side platforms serving two elevated tracks. A ramp leads up to the station from street level and a footbridge connects the platforms. Weather shelters are provided on both platforms.

== Adjacent stations ==
«	Service	»
JR Shikoku
Dosan Line
Tosa-Ikku	Local	Kōchi
Tosa Kuroshio Railway
Asa Line
Tosa-Ikku	Local	Kōchi

== History ==
The station was opened by Japanese National Railways (JNR) on 15 April 1952 as a new stop on the existing Dosan Line. With the privatization of JNR on 1 April 1987, control of the station passed to JR Shikoku.

== Surrounding area ==
- Mount Itagaki (Taisuke Itagaki Ancestral Cemetery)
- Kakegawa Shrine

== See also ==
- List of railway stations in Japan
