= Nunoshida Station =

Railway station in Kōchi, Japan

Nunoshida Station 布師田駅
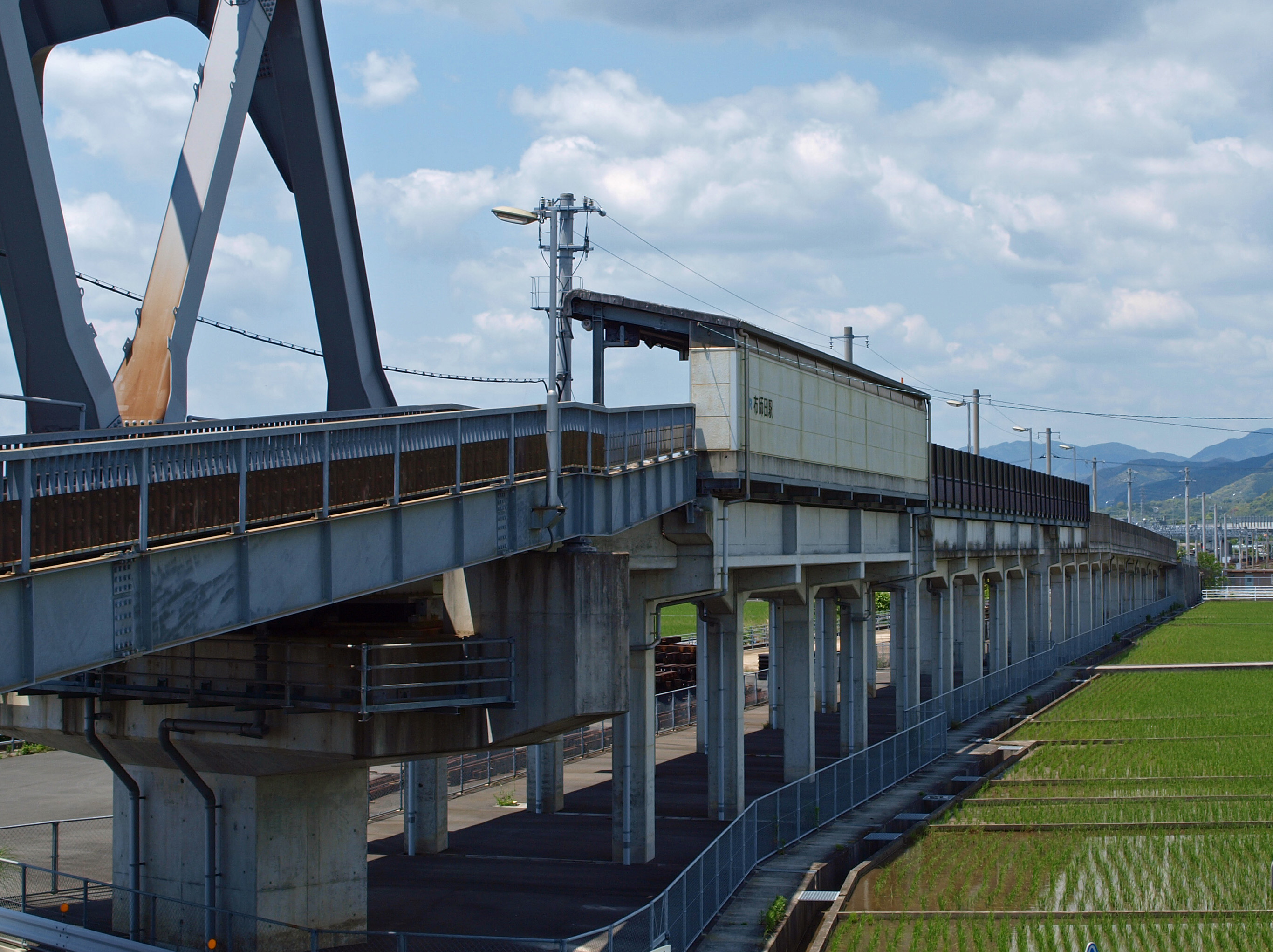
- Nunoshida Station in 2010

General information
- Location: Nunoshida, Kochi-shi, Kōchi-ken 781-5101; Japan
- Coordinates: 33°34′33″N 133°35′25″E
- Operator: JR Shikoku
- Line: ■ Dosan Line ■ Asa Line
- Distance: 121.4 km from Tadotsu
- Platforms: 1 side platform
- Tracks: 1

Construction
- Structure type: Elevated
- Parking: Available
- Cycle facilities: Available
- Accessible: Yes - ramp leads up to elevated platform

Other information
- Status: Unstaffed
- Station code: D42

History
- Opened: 15 April 1952

Passengers
- FY2019: 184
Location
- Location within Kochi Prefecture Location within Japan

Nunoshida Station (布師田駅, Nunoshida-eki) is junction passenger railway station located in the city of Kōchi city, the capital of Kōchi Prefecture, Japan. It is operated by JR Shikoku and has the station number "D42".

== Lines ==
The station is served by the JR Shikoku Dosan Line and is located 121.4 km from the beginning of the line at Tadotsu.

Although Gomen is the official western terminus of the third-sector Tosa Kuroshio Railway Asa Line (also known as the Gomen-Nahari Line), all its rapid and some local trains continue towards Kōchi on the Dosan Line tracks with Nunoshida as one of their intermediate stops.

== Layout ==
The station, which is unstaffed, consists of a side platform serving a single elevated track. A ramp leads up to the platform street level. A shelter and an automated ticket vending machine are provided on the platform. Bicycle parking lots are provided at the foot of the ramp.

== Adjacent stations ==
| « | Service | » |
JR Shikoku
Dosan Line
| Tosa-Ōtsu | Local | Tosa-Ikku |
Tosa Kuroshio Railway
Asa Line
| Tosa-Ōtsu | Local | Tosa-Ikku |

== History ==
The station was opened by Japanese National Railways (JNR) on 15 April 1952 as a new stop on the existing Dosan Line. With the privatization of JNR on 1 April 1987, control of the station passed to JR Shikoku.

== Surrounding area ==
- Kōchi Operations Centre (高知運転所, Kōchi-unten-sho) - Nunoshida is the nearest station and overlooks this major rail yard but trains bound for it branch off the main track at Tosa-Ikku.

== Surrounding area ==
- Kokubun River

== See also ==
- List of railway stations in Japan
