= Engyōjiguchi Station =

Railway station in Kōchi, Japan

Engyōjiguchi Station 円行寺口駅
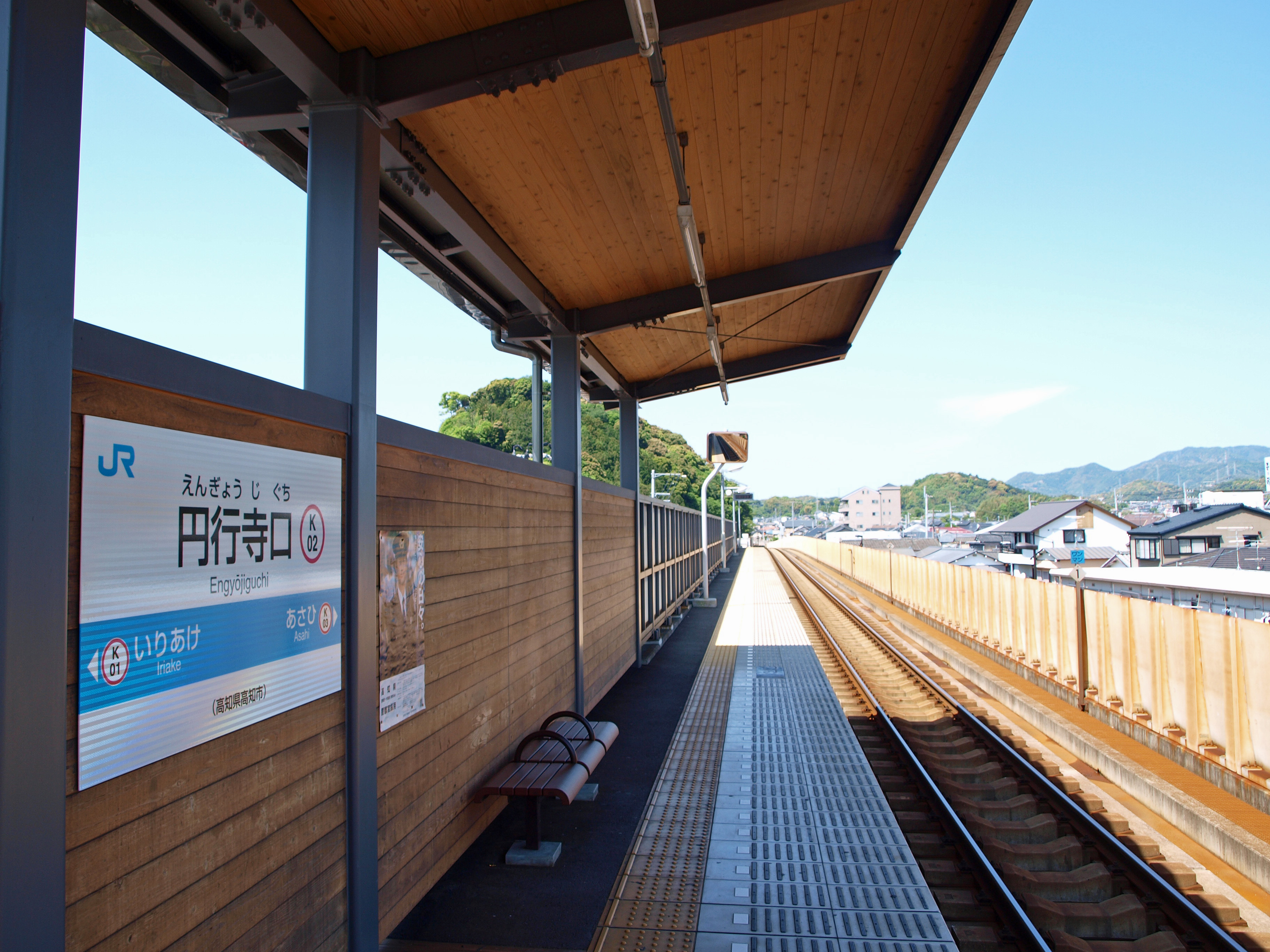
- Engyōjiguchi Station in 2010

General information
- Location: 2 Chome-20 Shinyashiki, Kōchi-shi, Kōchi-ken 780-0911; Japan
- Coordinates: 33°33′57″N 133°31′15″E
- Operator: JR Shikoku
- Line: ■ Dosan Line
- Distance: 128.7 km from Tadotsu
- Platforms: 1 side platform
- Tracks: 1

Construction
- Structure type: Elevated
- Parking: Available
- Cycle facilities: Under the elevated track
- Accessible: Yes - elevator to platform

Other information
- Status: Unstaffed
- Station code: K02

History
- Opened: 1 October 1964

Passengers
- FY2019: 518
Location
- Location within Kochi Prefecture Location within Japan

Engyōjiguchi Station (円行寺口駅, Engyōjiguchi-eki) is a passenger railway station located in the city of Kōchi, the capital of Kōchi Prefecture, Japan. It is operated by JR Shikoku and has the station number "K02".

== Lines ==
The station is served by JR Shikoku's Dosan Line and is located 128.7 km from the beginning of the line at Tadotsu.

== Layout ==
The station, which is unstaffed, consists of a side platform serving a single elevated track. There is no station building, only a shelter on the platform for waiting passengers and a ticket vending machine. There is an elevator from street level to the platform for barrier-free access. Parking for bikes is available under the elevated track and for cars across the street.

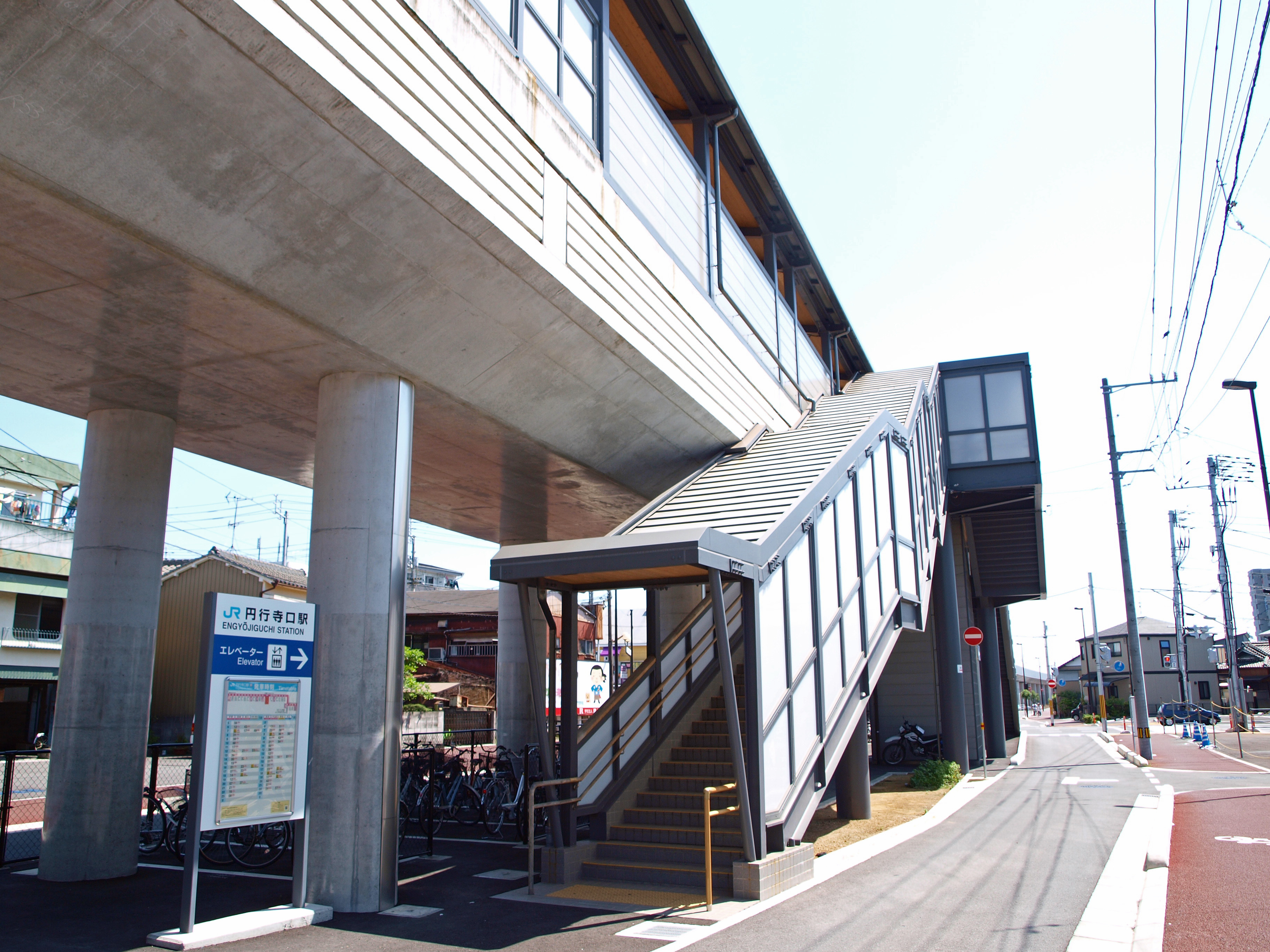
View of the station entrance in 2010.

== Adjacent stations ==
«	Service	»
Dosan Line
Iriake	-	Asahi

== History ==
The station was opened on 1 October 1964 by Japanese National Railways (JNR) as a new stop along the existing Dosan Line. With the privatization of JNR on 1 April 1987, control of the station passed to JR Shikoku. In 2008, it was rebuilt and opened as an elevated station as part of a project to elevate Kōchi Station and 4.1 km of nearby tracks to improve traffic circulation in the city.

== Surrounding area ==
The station is surrounded by residential areas.

== See also ==
- List of railway stations in Japan
