= Iriake Station =

Railway station in Kōchi, Japan

Iriake Station 入明駅
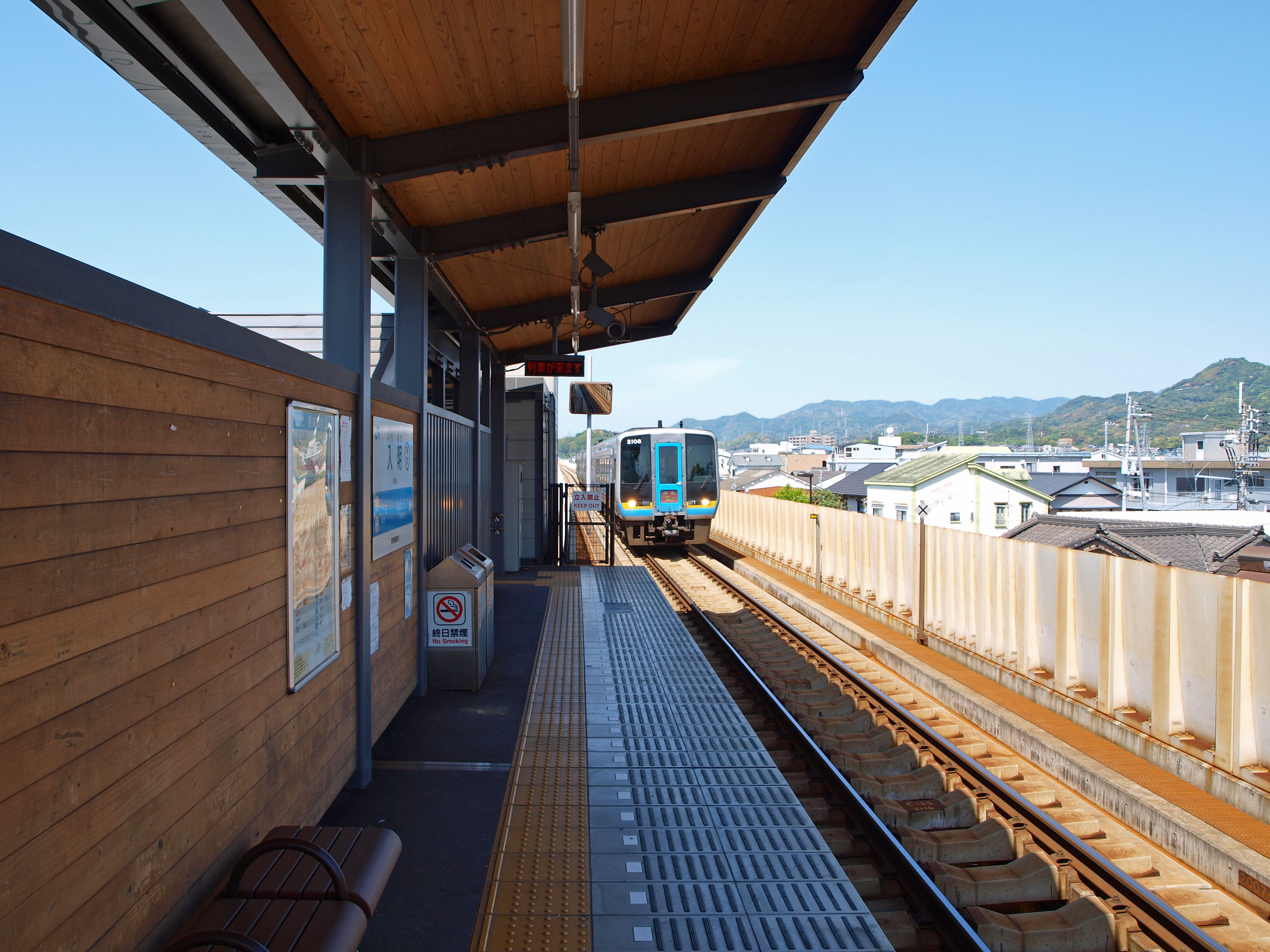
- Iriake Station in 2010

General information
- Location: 14 Iriakechō, Kōchi-shi, Kōchi-ken 780-0041; Japan
- Coordinates: 33°34′03″N 133°31′49″E
- Operator: JR Shikoku
- Line: Dosan Line
- Distance: 127.9 km (79.5 mi) from Tadotsu
- Platforms: 1 side platform
- Tracks: 1

Construction
- Structure type: Elevated
- Parking: Available
- Cycle facilities: Under the elevated track
- Accessible: Yes - elevator to platform

Other information
- Status: Unstaffed
- Station code: K01

History
- Opened: 15 December 1961; 64 years ago

Passengers
- FY2019: 956

Services
| Preceding station | JR Shikoku | Following station |
|---|---|---|
| Kōchi towards Kubokawa | Dosan Line | Engyōjiguchi towards Tadotsu |
Location
- Location within Kochi Prefecture Location within Japan

Iriake Station (入明駅, Iriake-eki) is a passenger railway station located in the city of Kōchi, the capital of Kōchi Prefecture, Japan. It is operated by JR Shikoku and has the station number "K01".

== Lines ==
The station is served by JR Shikoku's Dosan Line and is located 127.9 km from the beginning of the line at Tadotsu.

== Layout ==
The station, which is unstaffed, consists of a side platform serving a single elevated track. There is no station building, only a shelter on the platform for waiting passengers and a ticket vending machine. There is an elevator from street level to the platform for barrier-free access. Parking for bikes is available under the elevated track and for cars across the street.

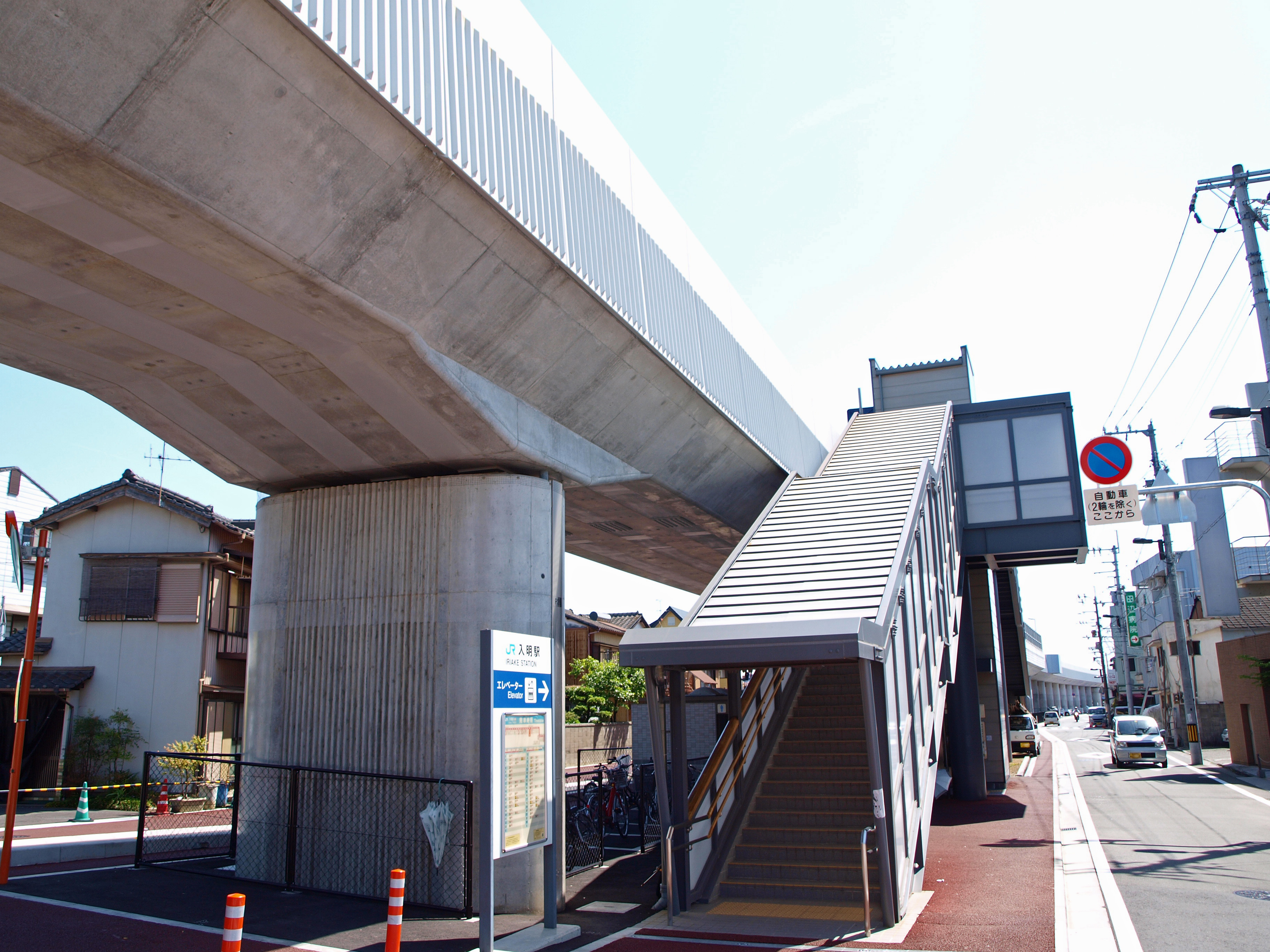
View of the station entrance in 2010.

== History ==
The station was opened on 15 December 1961 by Japanese National Railways (JNR) as a new stop along the existing Dosan Line. With the privatization of JNR on 1 April 1987, control of the station passed to JR Shikoku. In 2008, it was rebuilt and opened as an elevated station as part of a project to elevate Kōchi Station and 4.1 km of nearby tracks to improve traffic circulation in the city.

== Surrounding area ==
- Kochi Prefectural Kochi Ozu High School
- Kōchi Castle

== See also ==
- List of railway stations in Japan
