= Tosa-Ikku Station =

Railway station in Kōchi, Japan

Tosa-Ikku Station 土佐一宮駅
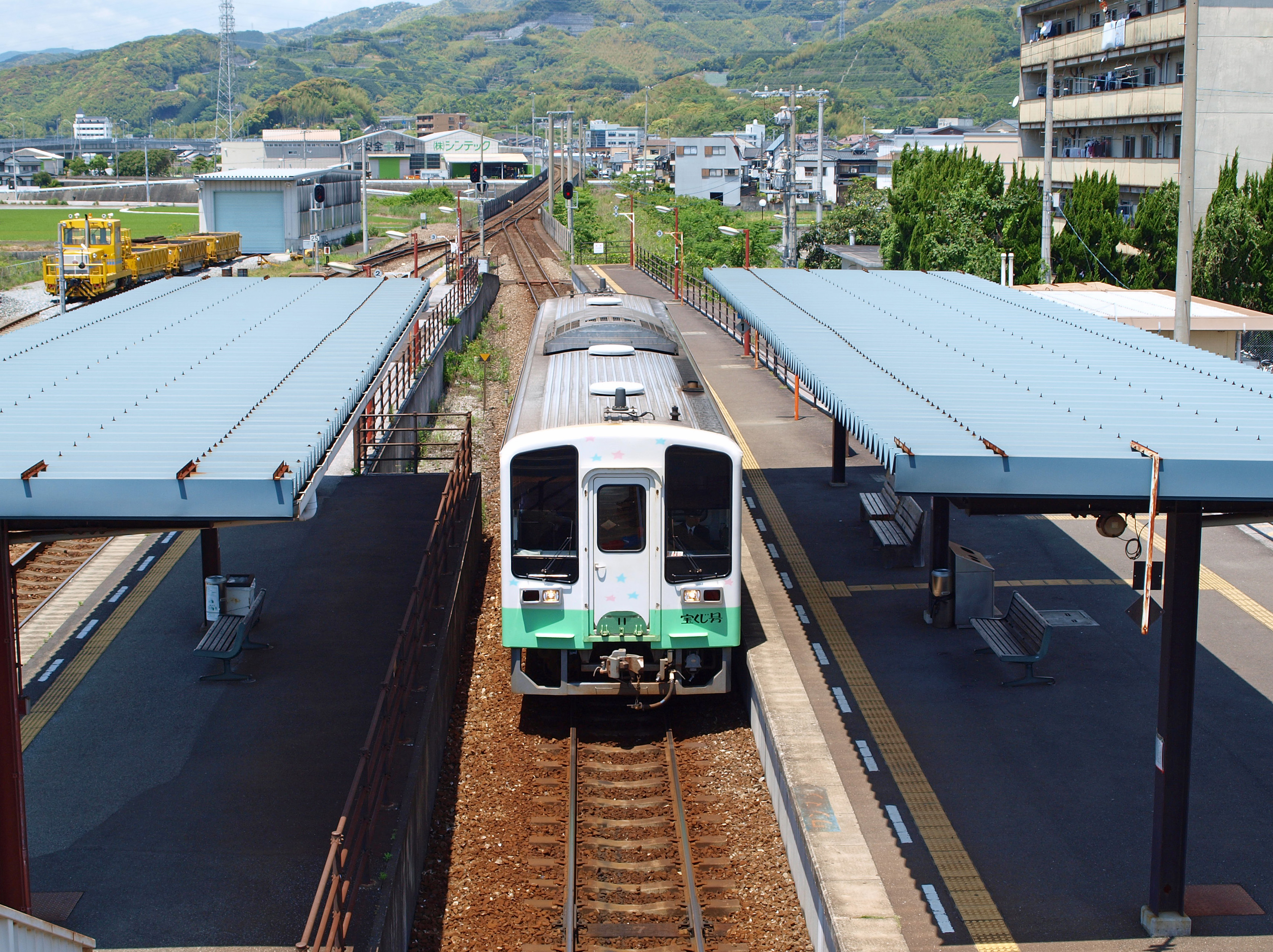
- Tosa-Ikku Station in 2010

General information
- Location: 1 Ikkutokudani, Kōchi-shi, Kōchi-ken 781-8133; Japan
- Coordinates: 33°34′44″N 133°34′38″E
- Operator: JR Shikoku
- Line: ■ Dosan Line ■ Asa Line
- Distance: 122.7 km from Tadotsu
- Platforms: 2 side platforms
- Tracks: 2 + 1 branch line/passing loop

Construction
- Structure type: At grade
- Cycle facilities: Designated parking lots for bikes
- Accessible: No - platforms are linked by a footbridge

Other information
- Status: Unstaffed
- Station code: D43

History
- Opened: 5 December 1925

Passengers
- FY2019: 708
Location
- Location within Kochi Prefecture Location within Japan

Tosa-Ikku Station (土佐一宮駅, Tosa-Ikku-eki) is a junction passenger railway station located in the city of Kōchi city, the capital of Kōchi Prefecture, Japan. It is operated by JR Shikoku and has the station number "D43".

== Lines ==
The station is served by the JR Shikoku Dosan Line and is located 122.7 km from the beginning of the line at Tadotsu.

Although Gomen is the official western terminus of the third-sector Tosa Kuroshio Railway Asa Line (also known as the Gomen-Nahari Line), all its rapid and some local trains continue towards Kōchi on the Dosan Line tracks with Tosa-Ikku as one of their intermediate stops.

== Layout ==
The station, which is unstaffed, consists of two side platforms (not opposed) serving two tracks. A small waiting room has been erected to one side of the tracks. A ramp leads up to one platform from the waiting room. A footbridge is used to access the other platform. Designated bicycle parking lots are provided near the waiting room. There is a third track which branches off at the station which leads to the Kōchi Operations Centre (高知運転所, Kōchi-unten-sho) (a rail yard).

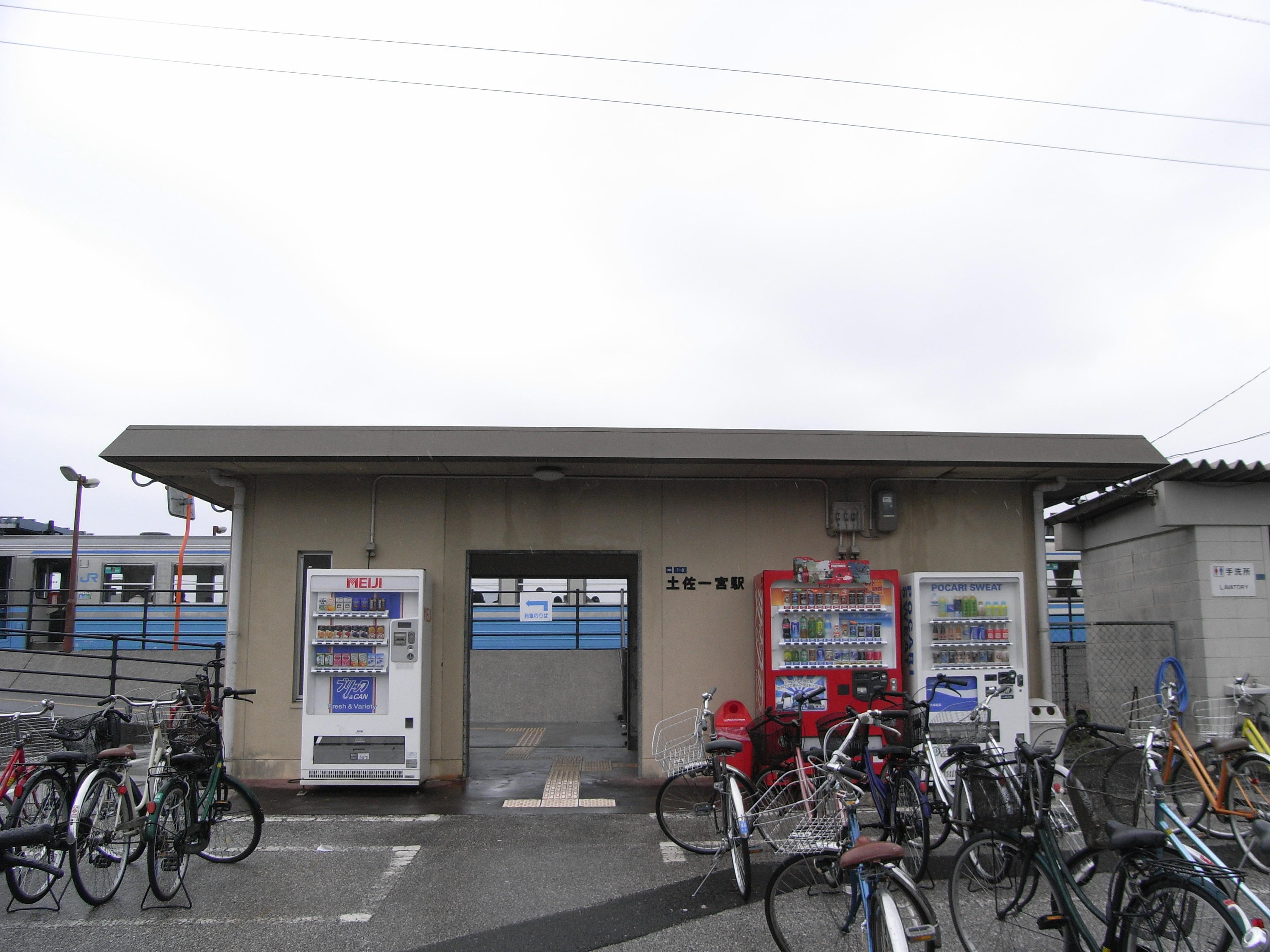
The waiting room of Tosa-Ikku Station in 2008.

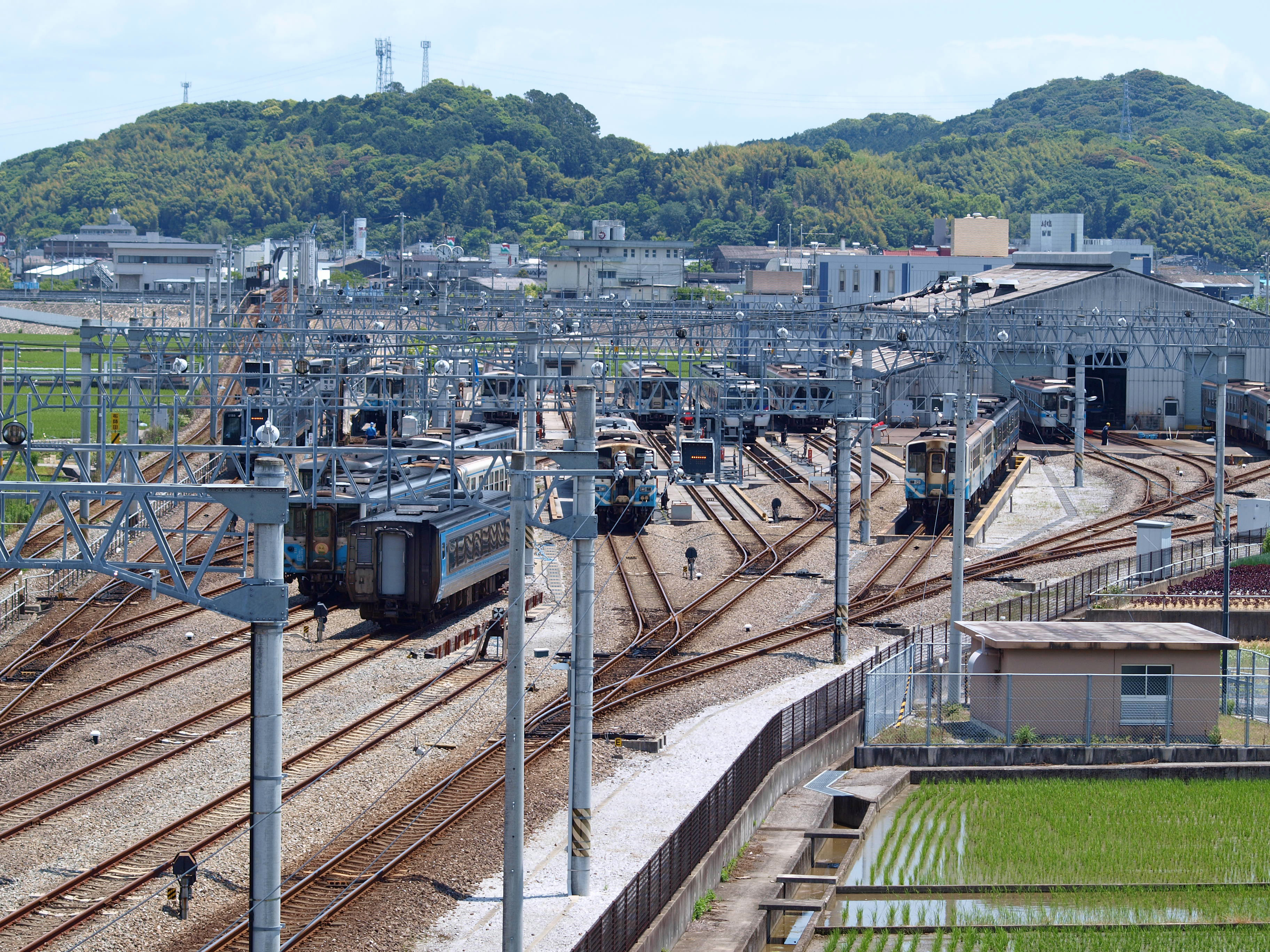
A view of the Kōchi Operations Centre in 2010. Trains enter the branch line for this rail yard from Tosa-Ikku.

== Adjacent stations ==
«	Service	»
JR Shikoku
Dosan Line
Nunoshida	Local	Azōno
Tosa Kuroshio Railway
Asa Line
Nunoshida	Local	Azōno

== History ==
The station opened on 5 December 1925 as an intermediate stop when the then Kōchi Line (now Dosan Line) was extended from Kōchi eastwards and then northwards towards Tosa-Yamada. At that time the station was operated by Japanese Government Railways, later becoming Japanese National Railways (JNR). With the privatization of JNR on 1 April 1987, control of the station passed to JR Shikoku.

== Surrounding area ==
- Kochi Prefectural Kochi Higashi High School
- Japan National Route 195 Bypass (Akebono Highway)
- Kokubun River
- Tosa Shrine

== See also ==
- List of railway stations in Japan
