= Hakawa Station =

Railway station in Ino, Kōchi Prefecture, Japan

Hakawa Station 波川駅
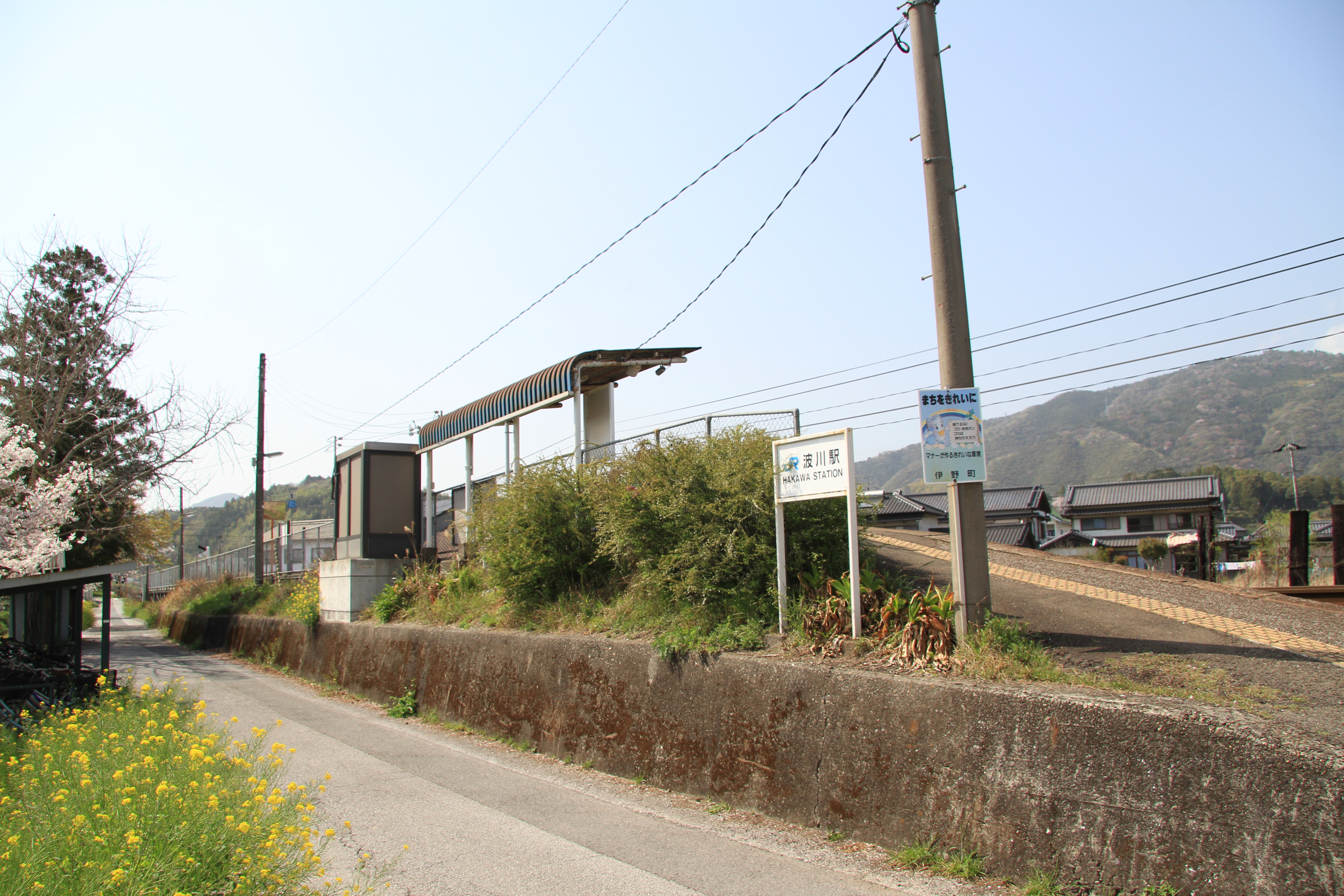
- Hakawa Station in 2011

General information
- Location: Hakawa, Ino, Agawa-gun, Kōchi-ken 781-2128; Japan
- Coordinates: 33°32′38″N 133°24′50″E
- Operator: JR Shikoku
- Line: ■ Dosan Line
- Distance: 139.5 km from Tadotsu
- Platforms: 1 side platform
- Tracks: 1

Construction
- Cycle facilities: Bike shed
- Accessible: Yes - ramp leads up to platform

Other information
- Status: Unstaffed
- Station code: K08

History
- Opened: 1 October 1964

Passengers
- FY2019: 314
Location
- Location within Kochi Prefecture Location within Japan

Hakawa Station (波川駅, Hakawa-eki) is a passenger railway station located in the town of Ino, Agawa District, Kōchi Prefecture, Japan. It is operated by JR Shikoku and has the station number "K08".

== Lines ==
The station is served by JR Shikoku's Dosan Line and is located 139.5 km from the beginning of the line at Tadotsu.

== Layout ==
The station, which is unstaffed, consists of a side platform serving a single line. There is no station building, but a weather shelter and an automatic ticket vending machine have been set up on the platform. A ramp leads up to the platform from the access road. A bike shed is provided near the base of the ramp.

== Adjacent stations ==
«	Service	»
Dosan Line
Ino	Local	Omurajinjamae

== History ==
The station opened on 1 October 1964 as a new station on the existing Dosan Line. At this time the station was operated by Japanese Government Railways, later becoming Japanese National Railways (JNR). With the privatization of JNR on 1 April 1987, control of the station passed to JR Shikoku.

== Surrounding area ==
- Japan National Route 33
- Genba Castle ruins

== See also ==
- List of railway stations in Japan
