= Tadotsu, Kagawa =

Tadotsu 多度津町
- Town
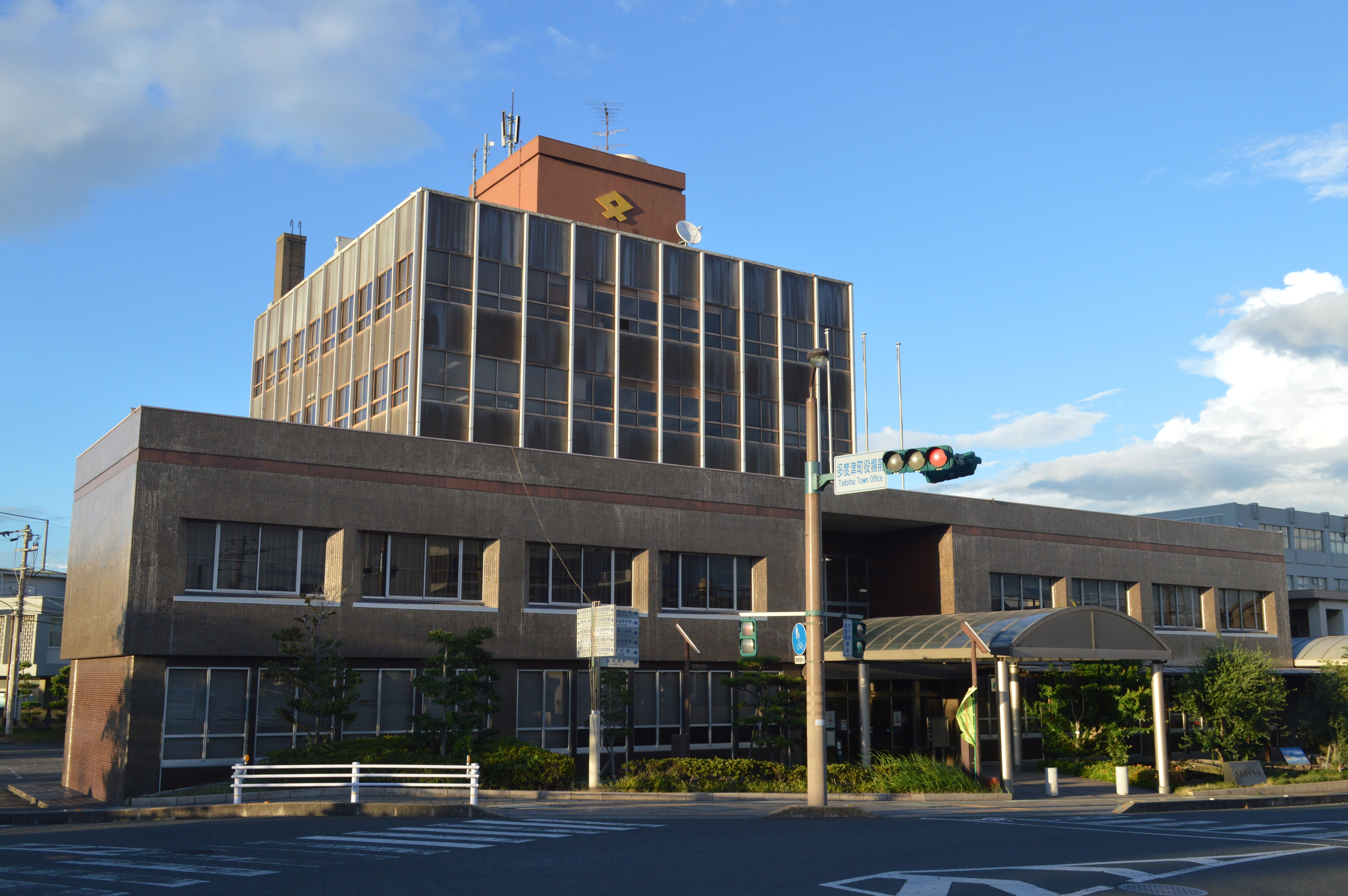
- Tadotsu Town Hall

- Flag Emblem
- Location of Tadotsu in Kagawa Prefecture

- Location in Japan
- Coordinates: 34°16′N 133°45′E
- Country: Japan
- Region: Shikoku
- Prefecture: Kagawa
- District: Nakatado

Government
  - Mayor: Yukio Maruo

Area
  - Total: 24.39 km^{2} (9.42 sq mi)

Population (October 1, 2022)
  - Total: 22,124
  - Density: 907.1/km^{2} (2,349/sq mi)
- Time zone: UTC+09:00 (JST)
- City hall address: 3-3-95 Sakae-cho, Tadotsu-cho, Nakatado-gun, Kagawa-ken 764-8501
- Climate: Cfa
- Website: Official website
- Symbols
- Flower: Sakura
- Tree: Sakura

Shorinji Kempo head dōjō

Tadotsu (多度津町, Tadotsu-chō) is a town located in Nakatado District, Kagawa Prefecture, Japan. As of 1 October 2022, the town had an estimated population of 22,124 in 10365 households and a population density of 270 persons per km^{2}. The total area of the town is 24.39 square kilometres (9.42 sq mi).

== Geography ==
Tadotsu is located in central Kagawa Prefecture. It borders the Sanuki Plain to the south and the scenic Setonaikai National Park to the north. The inhabited islands of Takamijima and Sanagishima of the Shiwaku Islands are located within the town borders.

=== Neighbouring municipalities ===
Kagawa Prefecture

- Marugame
- Mitoyo
- Zentsūji

=== Climate ===
Tadotsu has a humid subtropical climate (Köppen climate classification Cfa) with very warm summers and cool winters. Some precipitation falls throughout the year, but the months from April through October have heavier rain. The average annual temperature in Tadotsu is 16.5 °C (61.7 °F). The average annual rainfall is 1,116.8 mm (43.97 in) with July as the wettest month. The temperatures are highest on average in August, at around 28.3 °C (82.9 °F), and lowest in January, at around 6.2 °C (43.2 °F). The highest temperature ever recorded in Tadotsu was 38.5 °C (101.3 °F) on 16 July 1994; the coldest temperature ever recorded was −6.3 °C (20.7 °F) on 28 January 1945.

Climate data for Tadotsu (1991−2020 normals, extremes 1892−present)
Month	Jan	Feb	Mar	Apr	May	Jun	Jul	Aug	Sep	Oct	Nov	Dec	Year
Record high °C (°F)	18.7 (65.7)	24.8 (76.6)	24.8 (76.6)	29.9 (85.8)	31.2 (88.2)	35.4 (95.7)	38.5 (101.3)	38.2 (100.8)	37.2 (99.0)	32.6 (90.7)	26.8 (80.2)	21.9 (71.4)	38.5 (101.3)
Mean maximum °C (°F)	14.1 (57.4)	16.3 (61.3)	20.2 (68.4)	25.3 (77.5)	29.0 (84.2)	31.6 (88.9)	35.0 (95.0)	35.9 (96.6)	33.5 (92.3)	28.4 (83.1)	22.4 (72.3)	17.2 (63.0)	36.2 (97.2)
Mean daily maximum °C (°F)	9.6 (49.3)	10.2 (50.4)	13.6 (56.5)	19.0 (66.2)	23.8 (74.8)	26.6 (79.9)	30.9 (87.6)	32.7 (90.9)	28.7 (83.7)	23.1 (73.6)	17.3 (63.1)	12.1 (53.8)	20.6 (69.2)
Daily mean °C (°F)	6.2 (43.2)	6.4 (43.5)	9.3 (48.7)	14.2 (57.6)	19.1 (66.4)	22.6 (72.7)	26.8 (80.2)	28.3 (82.9)	24.6 (76.3)	19.0 (66.2)	13.4 (56.1)	8.5 (47.3)	16.5 (61.8)
Mean daily minimum °C (°F)	2.7 (36.9)	2.6 (36.7)	5.2 (41.4)	10.0 (50.0)	15.0 (59.0)	19.5 (67.1)	23.9 (75.0)	25.1 (77.2)	21.2 (70.2)	15.2 (59.4)	9.4 (48.9)	4.8 (40.6)	12.9 (55.2)
Mean minimum °C (°F)	−1.5 (29.3)	−1.4 (29.5)	−0.1 (31.8)	3.5 (38.3)	9.7 (49.5)	15.4 (59.7)	20.6 (69.1)	21.6 (70.9)	15.5 (59.9)	9.3 (48.7)	3.6 (38.5)	0.2 (32.4)	−1.9 (28.6)
Record low °C (°F)	−6.3 (20.7)	−5.1 (22.8)	−3.9 (25.0)	−1.3 (29.7)	3.8 (38.8)	8.0 (46.4)	15.5 (59.9)	16.8 (62.2)	10.2 (50.4)	3.9 (39.0)	−0.7 (30.7)	−3.3 (26.1)	−6.3 (20.7)
Average precipitation mm (inches)	38.3 (1.51)	46.3 (1.82)	81.2 (3.20)	79.5 (3.13)	105.8 (4.17)	160.5 (6.32)	161.1 (6.34)	88.9 (3.50)	149.0 (5.87)	106.2 (4.18)	53.7 (2.11)	46.4 (1.83)	1,116.8 (43.97)
Average snowfall cm (inches)	0 (0)	trace	0 (0)	0 (0)	0 (0)	0 (0)	0 (0)	0 (0)	0 (0)	0 (0)	0 (0)	0 (0)	1 (0.4)
Average precipitation days (≥ 1.0 mm)	5.7	6.6	9.0	8.8	8.5	10.7	9.1	6.1	8.7	7.4	6.0	6.0	92.6
Average snowy days (≥ 1 cm)	0	0.4	0	0	0	0	0	0	0	0	0	0	0.4
Average relative humidity (%)	62	63	64	64	66	74	74	70	71	69	68	64	67
Mean monthly sunshine hours	141.9	150.7	180.8	198.6	213.8	162.9	204.5	233.5	166.3	171.8	149.8	139.4	2,113.9
Source: Japan Meteorological Agency

== Demographics ==
Per Japanese census data, the population of Tadotsu in 2020 is 22,445 people. Tadotsu has been conducting censuses since 1920.

Historical population
Year	Pop.	±%
1920	18,466	—
1925	18,902	+2.4%
1930	19,319	+2.2%
1935	18,939	−2.0%
1940	18,139	−4.2%
1945	23,868	+31.6%
1950	24,029	+0.7%
1955	23,378	−2.7%
1960	21,899	−6.3%
1965	20,421	−6.7%
1970	20,178	−1.2%
1975	21,883	+8.4%
1980	22,965	+4.9%
1985	23,870	+3.9%
1990	24,080	+0.9%
1995	23,749	−1.4%
2000	23,657	−0.4%
2005	23,613	−0.2%
2010	23,498	−0.5%
2015	23,366	−0.6%
2020	22,445	−3.9%
Tadotsu population statistics

== History ==
The area of Tadotsu was part of ancient Sanuki Province. During the Edo Period, the jin'ya of Tadotsu Domain, a subsidiary domain of Marugame Domain was located in Tadotsu, which developed as a jōkamachi. Following the Meiji restoration, the town of Tadotsu was established with the creation of the modern municipalities system on February 15, 1890. Tadotsu annexed the village of Toyohara on May 10, 1942 and the villages of Shika andShirakata on May 3, 1954. On September 30, Tadotsu annexed the villages of Sanagishima and Takamijima.

== Government ==
Tadotsu has a mayor-council form of government with a directly elected mayor and a unicameral town council of 14 members. Tadotsu contributes one member to the Kagawa Prefectural Assembly. In terms of national politics, the town is part of Kagawa 3rd district of the lower house of the Diet of Japan.

== Economy ==
Tadotsu has a mixed economy of agriculture and industry. Tadotsu Shipbuilding (affiliated company of Imabari Shipbuilding Group) and the Shikoku Railway Tadotsu vehicle maintenance factory are located in the town.

== Education ==
Tadotsu has four public elementary schools and one public middle school operated by the town government, and one public high schools operated by the Kagawa Prefectural Board of Education. There is also one private high school.

== Transportation ==
Shikoku Railway Company - Dosan Line

- Tadotsu

=== Railways ===
Shikoku Railway Company - Yosan Line

- (Tadotsu) - Kaiganji

=== Highways ===
- National Route 11

== Sister cities ==
- (China) Putuo District, Shanghai, friendship city since November 19, 2001

== Local attractions ==
- Amagiri Castle, National Historic Site
- Dōryū-ji, 77th temple on the Shikoku Pilgrimage
- Shorinji Kempo head dōjō

== Noted people from Tadotsu ==
- Masanori Yusa, Olympic gold medalist swimmer
