= Shimanto (train) =

Japanese limited express train service

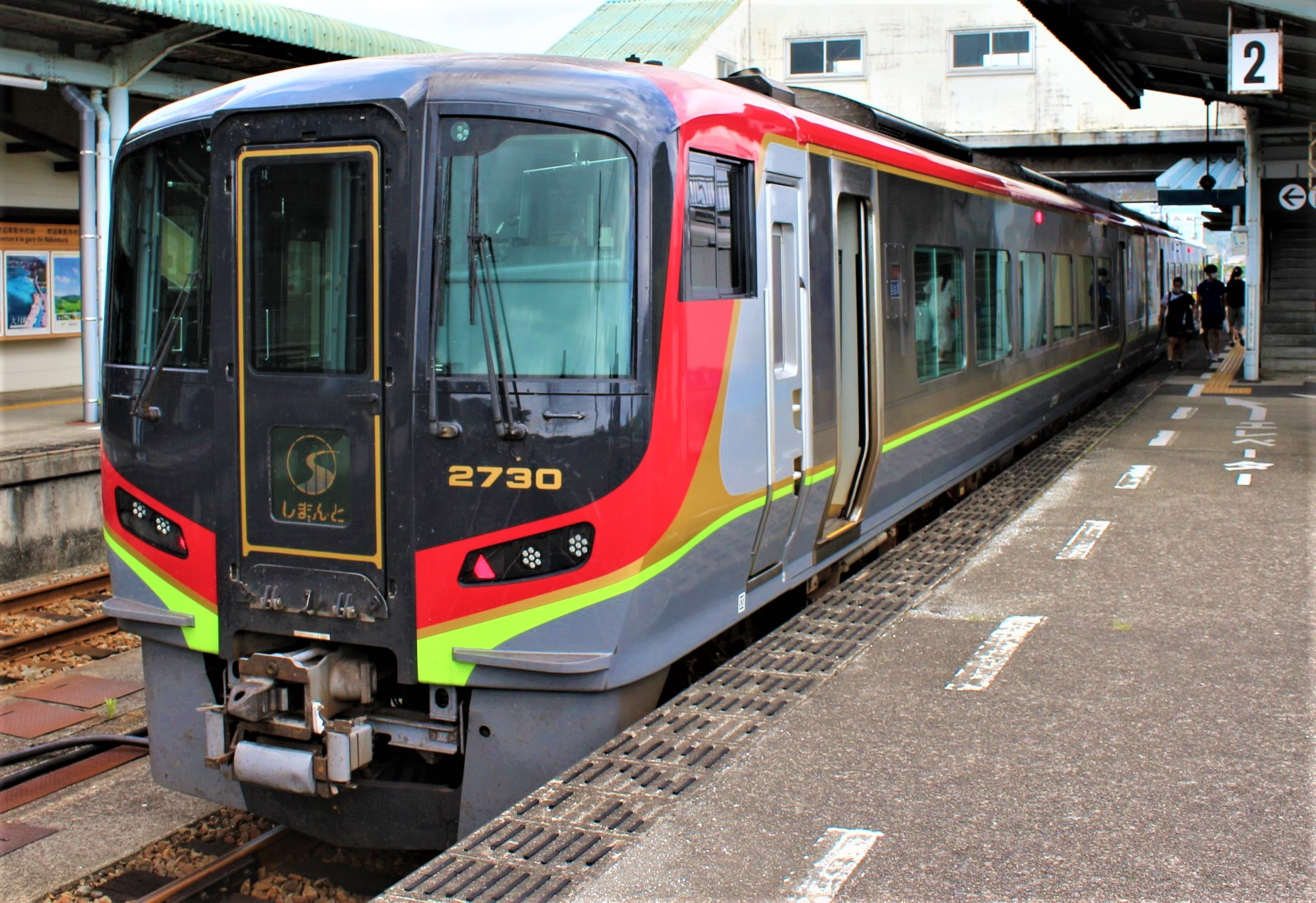
- A 2700 series DMU on a Shimanto service in 2021

Overview
- Service type: Limited express
- First service: 1988
- Current operator(s): JR Shikoku, Tosa Kuroshio Railway

Route
- Line(s) used: Yosan Line, Dosan Line, Nakamura Line, Sukumo Line

Technical
- Rolling stock: 2700 series DMUs
- Operating speed: 120 km/h (75 mph)

The Shimanto (しまんと) is a limited express train service in Japan operated by Shikoku Railway Company (JR Shikoku) and Tosa Kuroshio Railway which runs from Takamatsu to Kōchi with a few services continuing to Nakamura and Sukumo. Trains are formed of 2-car 2700 series DMUs, and sometimes are coupled with Nanpū services between Tadotsu or Utazu and Kochi.

The Shimanto service was introduced on 10 April 1988.

== Route ==
The main stations served by this service are as follows.

Takamatsu - Tadotsu - Kōchi - Nakamura - Sukumo

== Rolling stock ==
- 2700 series 2-car tilting DMUs (2019– )

=== Past rolling stock ===
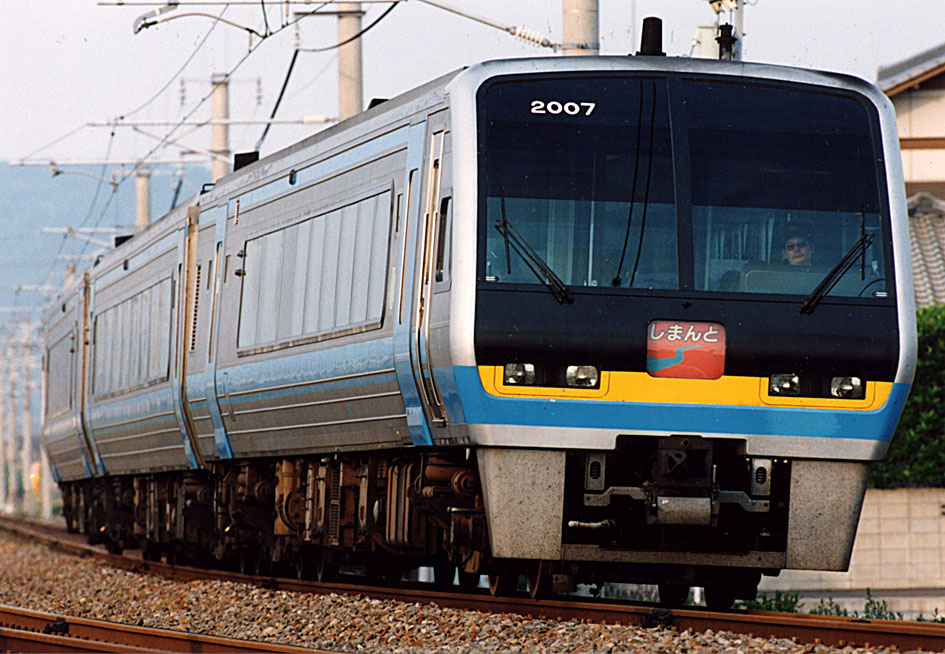
A 2000 series DMU on a Shimanto service in 1994

- KiHa 181 series DMUs (1988–1993)
- KiHa 185 series DMUs (1988–1993)
- 2000/N2000 series tilting DMUs (1989–2021)
