= Nanpū =

Japanese limited express train service

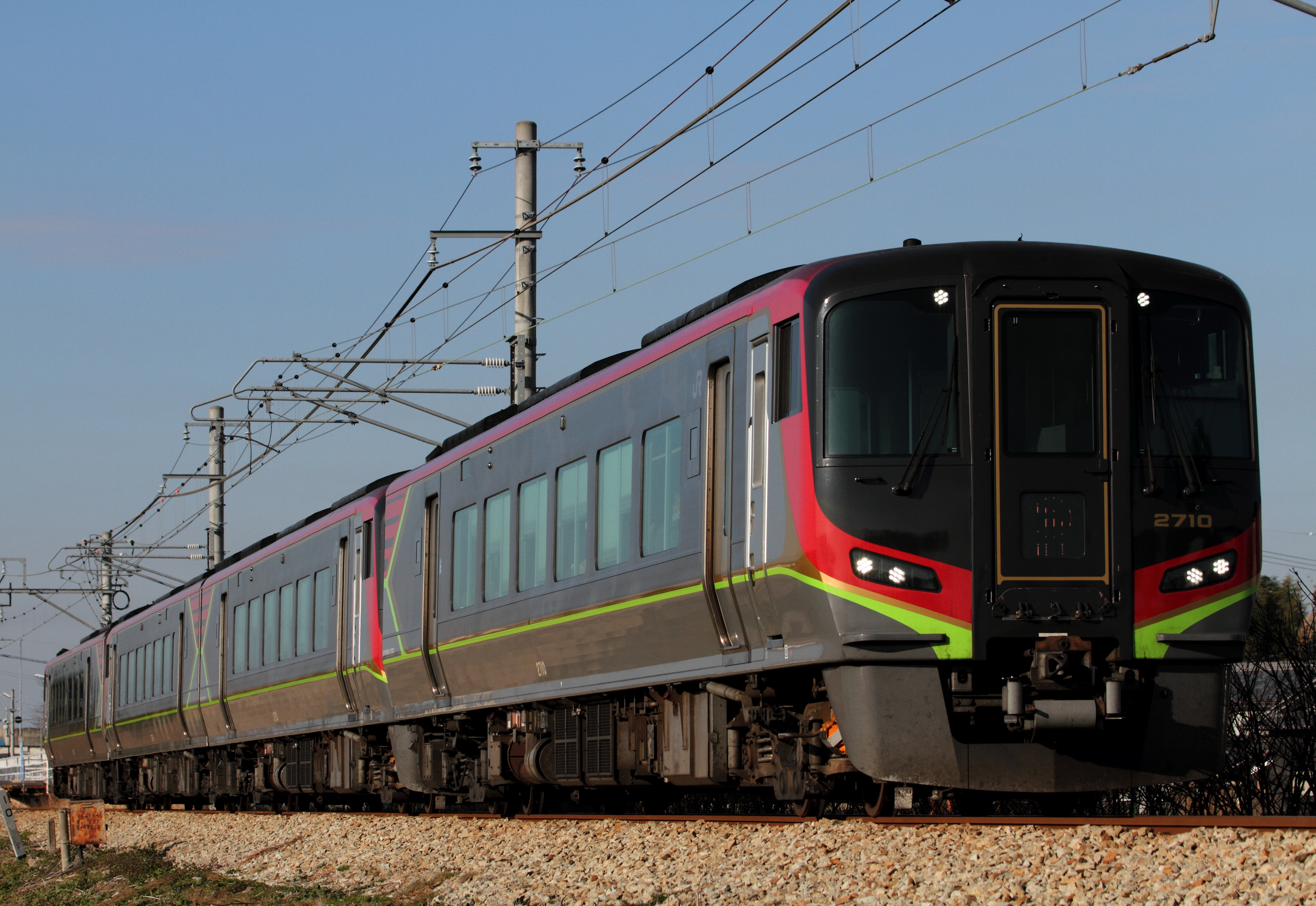
- A 2700 series DMU on a Nanpū service in January 2022

Overview
- Service type: Limited express
- First service: 1950 (Semi express); 1972 (Limited express)
- Current operator: JR Shikoku

Route
- Lines used: Seto-Ōhashi Line, Yosan Line, Dosan Line

Technical
- Rolling stock: 2700 series DMUs
- Operating speed: 120 km/h (75 mph)

The Nanpū (南風; English: "south wind") is a limited express train service in Japan operated by Shikoku Railway Company (JR Shikoku), which runs from Okayama to Kōchi. Trains are formed of 3-car or 2+3 car sets of 2700 series DMUs, and sometimes are coupled with Shimanto services between Tadotsu or Utazu and Kochi.

== Route ==
The main stations served by this service are as follows. Okayama - Tadotsu - Awa-Ikeda - Kōchi

== Rolling stock ==
- 2700 series 3- or 5-car tilting DMUs (2019– )

=== Past rolling stock ===
- KiHa 181 series DMUs (1972–1990)
- KiHa 185 series DMUs (1986–1991)
- 2000/N2000 series tilting DMUs (1990–2021)

== History ==
Nanpū services began as a semi express from the former Takamatsu Sanbashi Station to Kubokawa in Shikoku from 1 October 1950. From 1 October 1968, however, the name was used for express trains operating in Kyushu between Beppu and Nishi-Kagoshima. From 15 March 1972, the name returned to Shikoku, for limited express trains operating between Takamatsu and Nakamura. New 2700 series trains started operation in 2019, and completely replaced all older 2000 series DMUs by March 2021.
