= Ashizuri (train) =

Japanese limited express train service

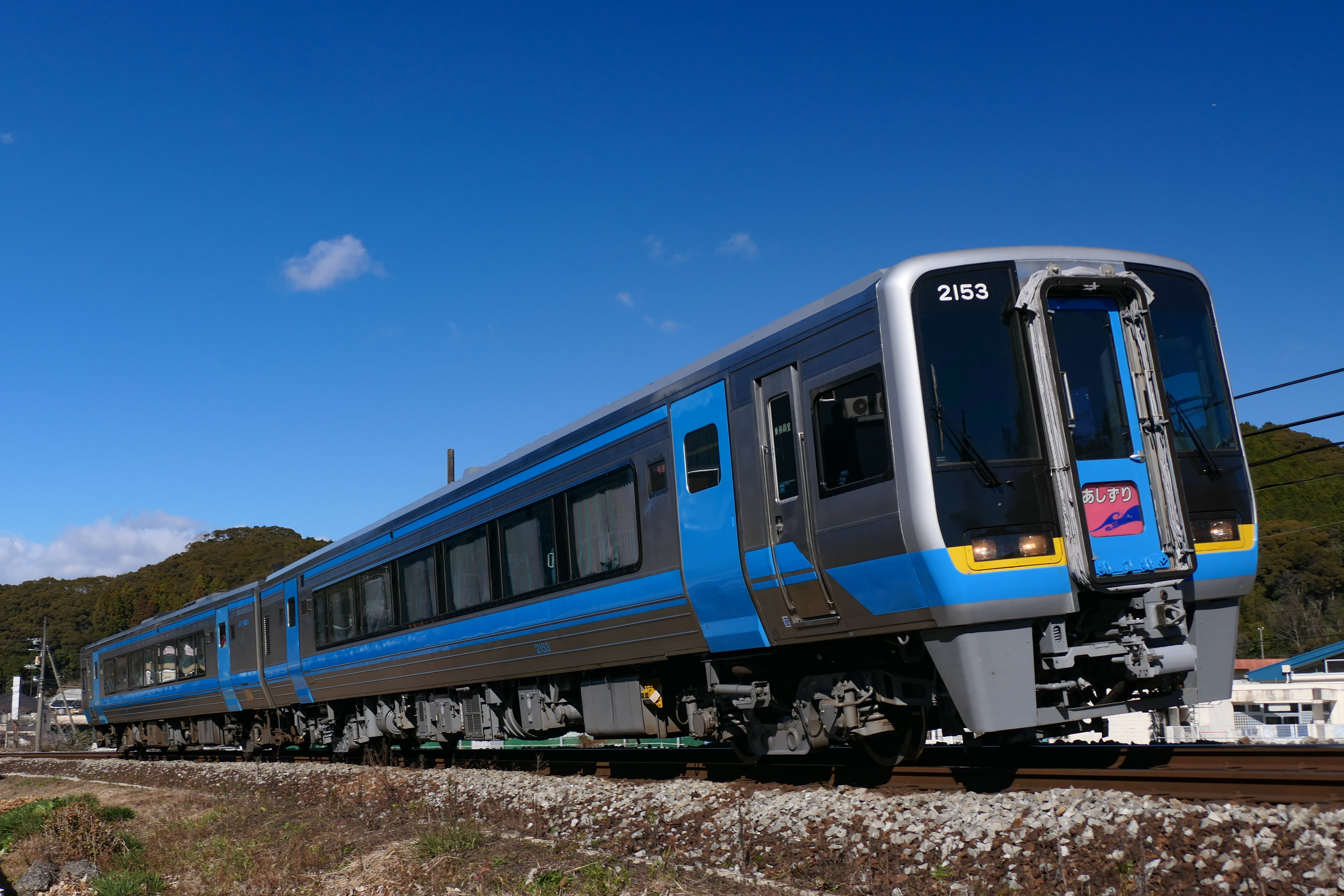
- A 2000 series DMU on an Ashizuri service in 2021

Overview
- Service type: Limited express
- First service: 1961 (Semi express); 1966 (Express); 1990 (Limited express)
- Current operator(s): JR Shikoku, Tosa Kuroshio Railway

Route
- Line(s) used: Dosan Line, Nakamura Line, Sukumo Line

Technical
- Rolling stock: N2000 series, 2000 series DMUs
- Operating speed: 120 km/h (75 mph)

The Ashizuri (あしずり) is a limited express train service in Japan operated by Shikoku Railway Company (JR Shikoku), which runs from Kōchi to Nakamura and Sukumo.

The Ashizuri service was introduced on 21 November 1990.

== Route ==
The main stations served by this service are as follows.

Kōchi - Nakamura - Sukumo

== Rolling stock ==
- 2000 series 2- 3- or 4-car tilting DMUs (from 1993)

=== Past rolling stock ===
- KiHa 181 series DMUs (1990–1993)
- KiHa 185 series DMUs (1990–1993)

== History ==
Ashizuri services began as a semi express from Takamatsu to Kubokawa in Shikoku from 15 April 1961. From 5 March 1966, the name was used for express trains operating. From 21 November 1990, the name was used for limited express trains operating between Kōchi and Nakamura.
