= Nakamura Station =

Railway station in Shimanto, Kōchi Prefecture, Japan

Nakamura Station 中村駅
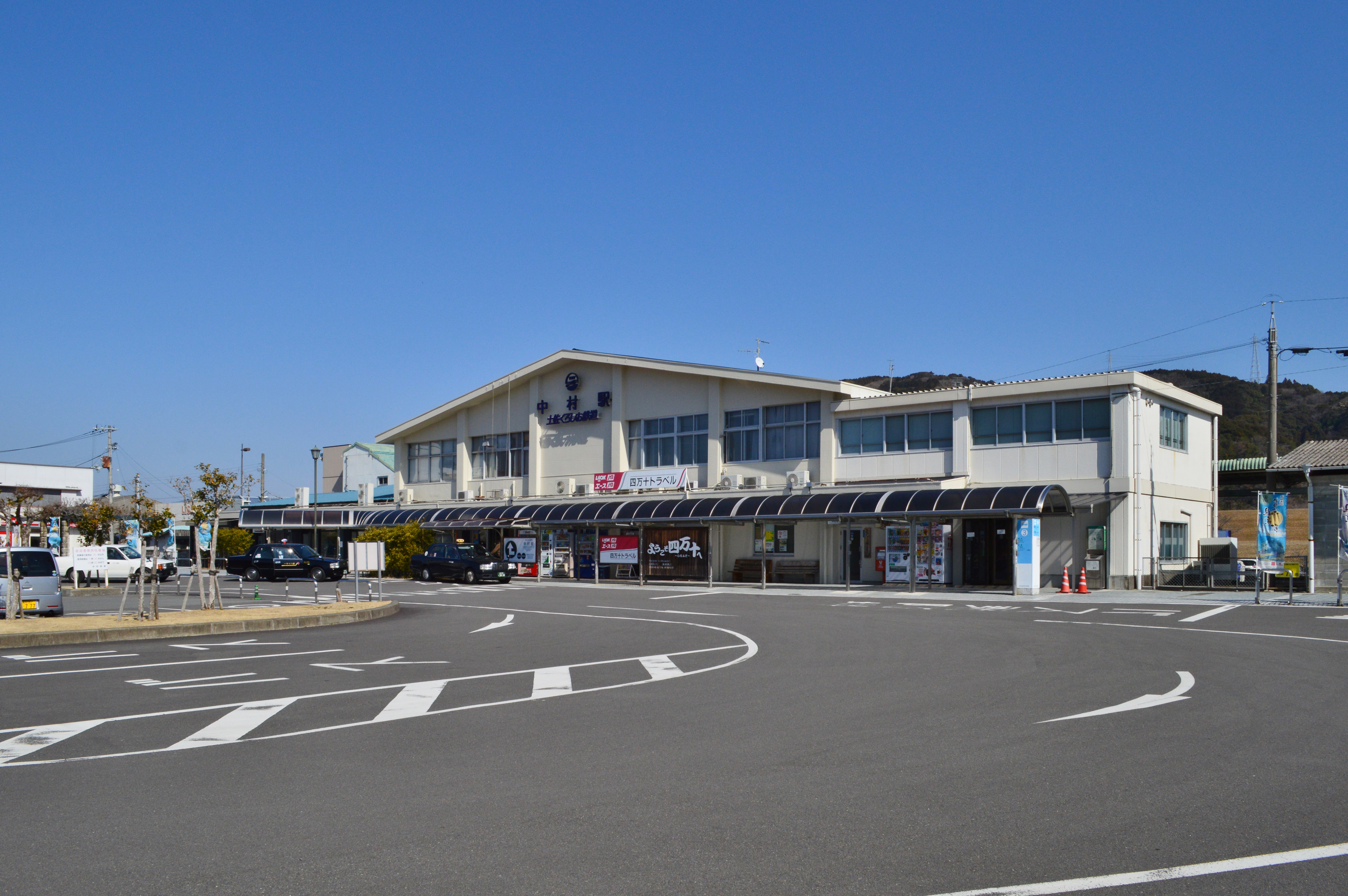
- Nakamura station facade in February 2018

General information
- Location: 7-1 Ekimaechō, Shimanto-shi, Kōchi-ken 787-0014; Japan
- Coordinates: 32°59′02″N 132°56′39″E
- Owner: Tosa Kuroshio Railway
- Operator: Tosa Kuroshio Railway
- Lines: ■ Nakamura Line; ■ Sukumo Line
- Distance: 43.0 km from Kubokawa
- Platforms: 2 (1 side, 1 island)
- Tracks: 3
- Connections: Bus station

Construction
- Parking: Available
- Cycle facilities: Bike shed
- Accessible: Yes

Other information
- Status: Staffed ticket office (Midori no Madoguchi)
- Station code: TK40
- Website: Official website

History
- Opened: 1 October 1970

Passengers
- FY2018: 923
Location
- Location within Kochi Prefecture Location within Japan

Nakamura Station (中村駅, Nakamura-eki) is a passenger railway station located in the city of Shimanto, Kōchi Prefecture, Japan. It is operated by the third-sector Tosa Kuroshio Railway, whose headquarters is located in the station building. The station is numbered "TK-40".

== Lines and services ==
Nakamura Station is the terminus of the 43.0 kilometer Tosa Kuroshio Nakamura Line which starts from Kubokawa. It is also the starting point of the 23.6 kilometer Tosa Kuroshio Sukumo Line which terminates at Sukumo.

The station is also served by two JR Shikoku limited express services. The Ashizuri limited express service starts from Kōchi and ends here. The Nanpū limited express service starts from Okayama and ends here, with one train a day going on to Sukumo.

== Layout ==
The station comprises a two-story station building with a side platform and an island platform serving three tracks. There is a staffed ticket window with a Midori no Madoguchi which allows passengers to make reservations and buy tickets for JR limited express and shinkansen services. On the ground floor there is a waiting area, cafe, and shop which sells local specialties. Coin lockers and baggage storage facilities are also provided. Parking and a bike shed are available outside the building. A bus station, car rental, bicycle rental are nearby. The station is wheelchair accessible.

From 2009 to 2010, the station underwent a major renovation. This featured the removal of ticket gates, and the remodeling of the waiting area/shop and platform benches in locally sourced Shimanto hinoki wood. The renovation subsequently won multiple design awards including the 2014 Brunel Award and the Japanese Institute of Design Promotion 2010 Good Design Award.

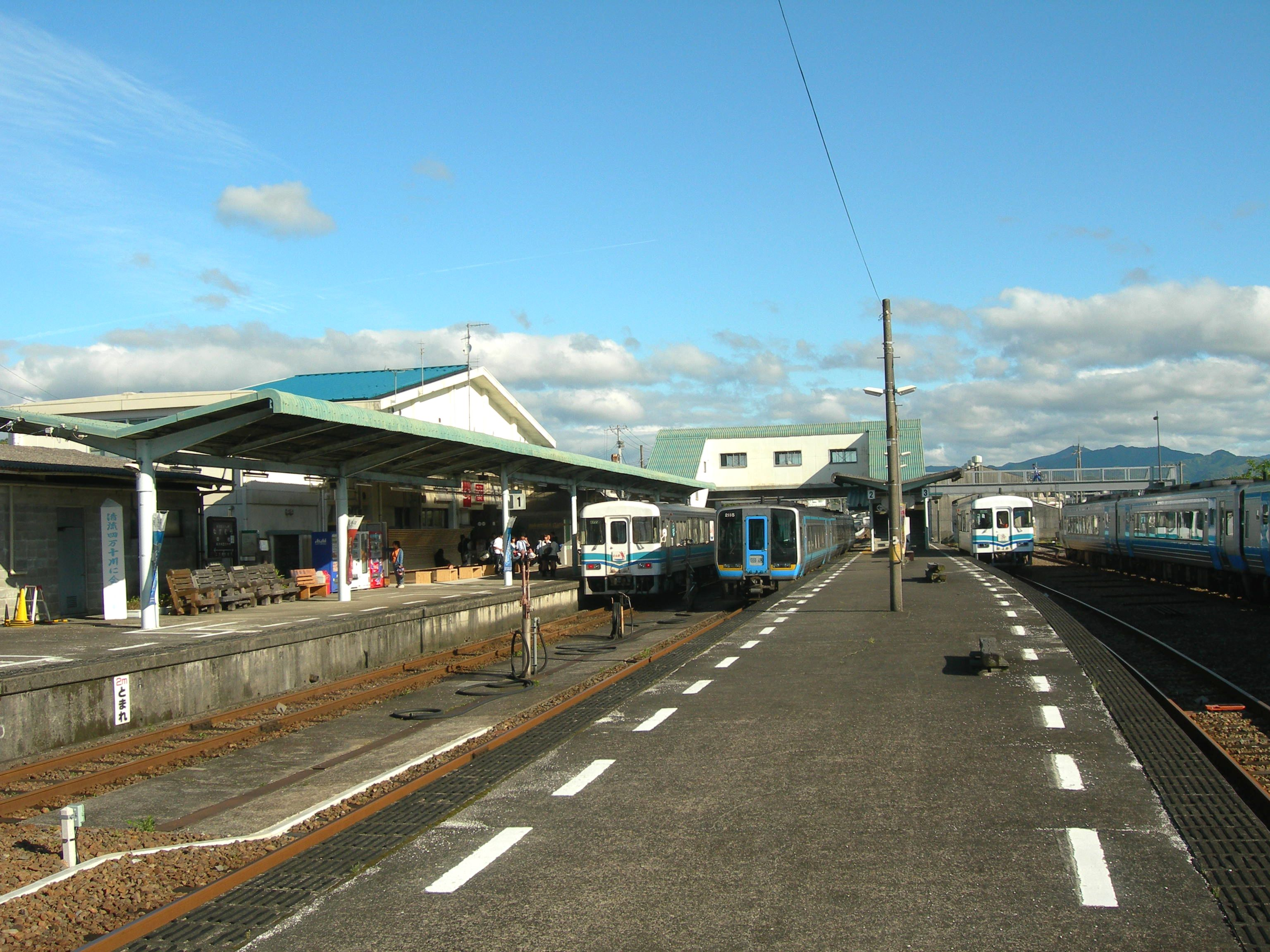
View of the station platforms in May 2010

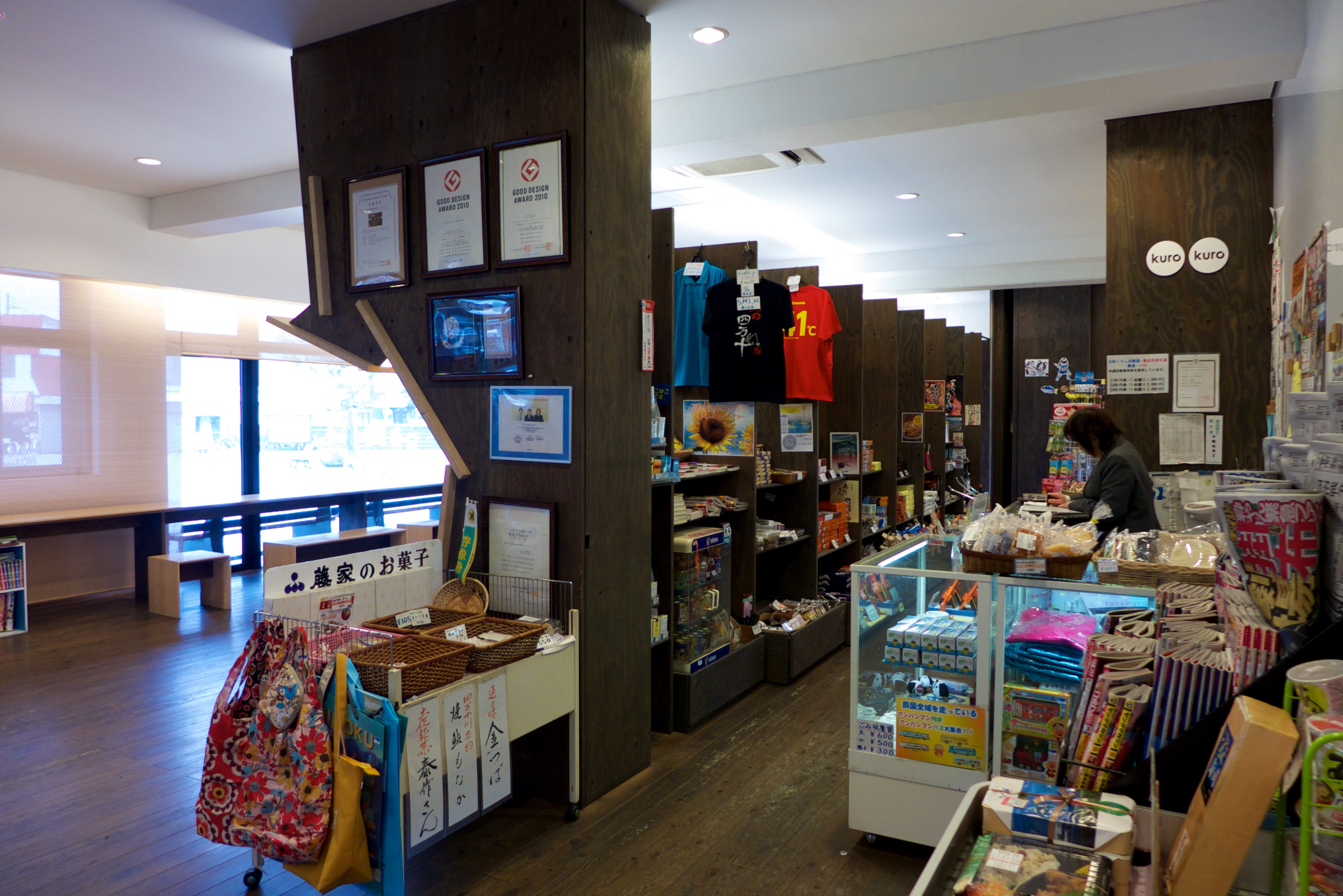
Station interior in 2014. Next to the shop, some design award certificates can be seen on the pillar. The waiting area is to the left.

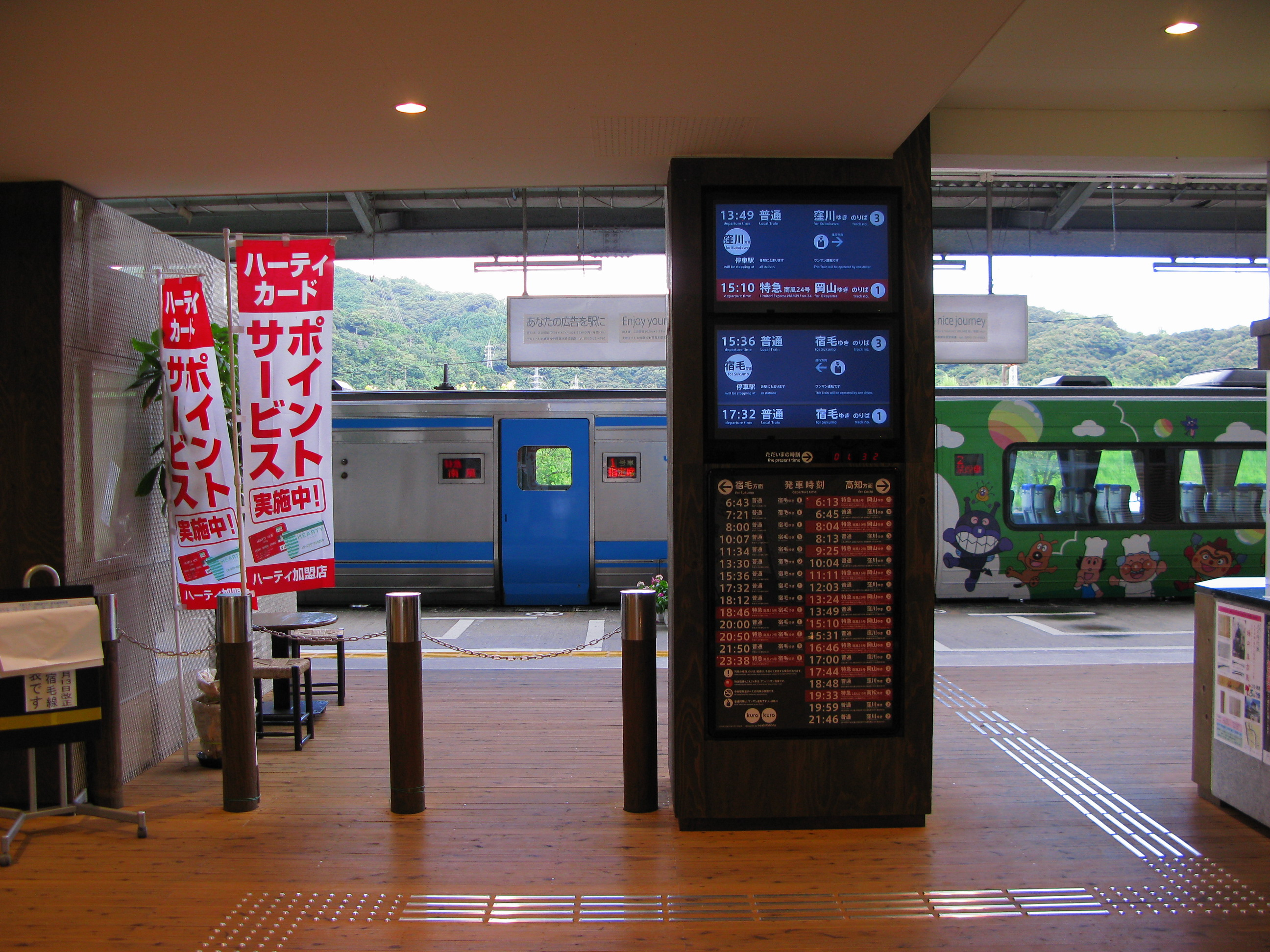
View towards the platforms. Note the absence of ticket gates, which were removed during the 2010 renovation. The train in the background is the Nanpū limited express.

== Adjacent stations ==
«	Service	»
Nakamura Line
Kotsuka	-	Terminus
Sukumo Line
Terminus	-	Gudō

== History ==
- October 1, 1970: The station opened as part of the extension of the Japan National Railways (JNR) Nakamura Line between Tosa-Saga and this station. The station was initially a terminus station.
- April 16, 1973: Midori-no-Madoguchi (Midori-no-Madoguchi counter) opens for business.
- February 1, 1984: Cargo handling was discontinued.
- April 1, 1987: Shikoku Railway (JR Shikoku) takes over the operation due to the privatization of Japan National Railways.
- April 1, 1988: The Nakamura Line is converted to Tosa Kuroshio Railway. The company's actual sales headquarters is established in the station building.
- October 1, 1997: With the opening of the Sukumo Line, the station becomes an intermediate station.
- 2005 (Heisei 17)
  - March 2: The entire Sukumo Line is suspended due to a collision at Sukumo Station on the Tosa Kuroshio Railway.
  - June 13: Limited express train service resumes between this station and Higashi-Sukumo Station.
- 2009 (Heisei 21)
  - November 7: Renovation work begins on the station's waiting room, concourse, restrooms, etc.
  - December 19, 2009: A SoftBank TV commercial filmed at this station and other locations begins airing. The commercial was filmed on platforms 2 and 3 of the station, as well as on trains arriving at and departing from the station.
- 2010 (Heisei 22)
  - March 20, 2010: A ceremony was held to celebrate the completion of the renovation of the station's waiting room (extended to platform 1), ticket office, concourse, and restrooms. In addition, an elevator connecting platform 1 to platforms 2 and 3 is put into service.
  - June 28: Public wireless LAN service by FREESPOT is launched throughout the station.
- October 15, 2014: The station building receives the Brunel Prize for Excellence in Station Building Architecture.
- March 14, 2020: Due to a timetable revision, the "Nanpuu" No. 6 train departing from this station between this station and Kochi Station was replaced by the "Ashizuri" No. 2 train, which connected to the "Nanpuu" No. 6 train at Kochi Station. As a result, direct trains from this station to Okayama have ceased.
- March 12, 2022: Due to a timetable revision, the "Shimanto" No. 10 train from Sukumo to Takamatsu via this station will stop at Kochi and be replaced by the "Ashizuri" No. 18. As a result, trains departing from this station that go beyond Kochi Station have ceased ("Shimanto" No. 1, a direct down train from Takamatsu Station to this station, continued operation).

== Passenger statistics ==
In fiscal 2011, the station was used by an average of 1,050 passengers daily.

== Surrounding area ==
- National Route 439

== See also ==
- List of railway stations in Japan
