= Kōchi Station (Kōchi) =

Railway station in Kōchi, Japan

Kōchi Station 高知駅
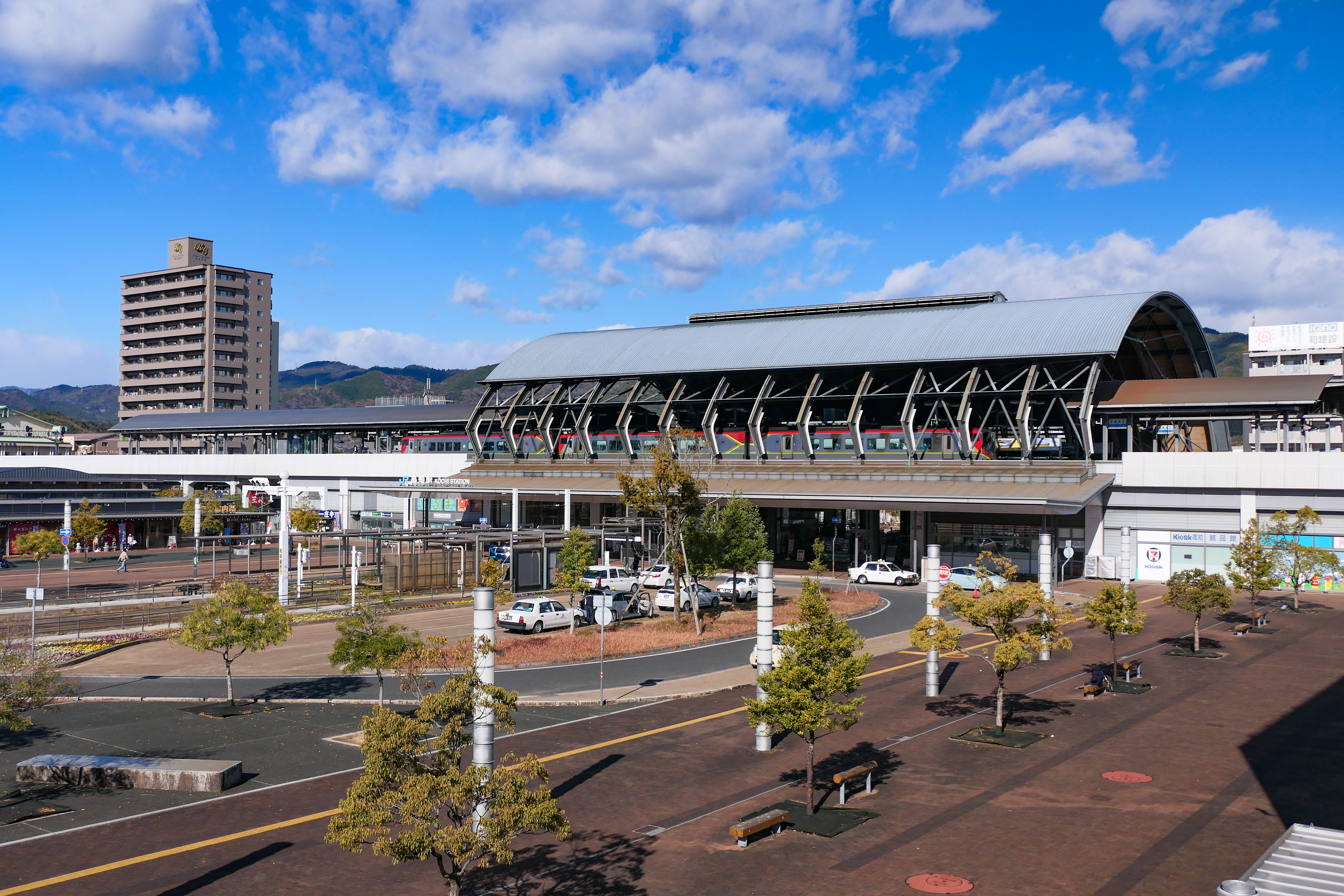
- Kōchi Station south exit

General information
- Location: 1-10, Sakaeda-chō 2-chōme, Kōchi-shi, Kōchi-ken （高知県高知市栄田町二丁目1-10） Japan
- Coordinates: 33.56693°N 133.543527°E
- Operator: JR Shikoku
- Line: Dosan Line
- Distance: 126.6 km from Tadotsu
- Platforms: 2 island platforms
- Connections: Bus terminal

Construction
- Architect: Hiroshi Naito

Other information
- Station code: D45/K00

History
- Opened: 15 November 1924; 101 years ago

Passengers
- FY2023: 4,547
Location
- Location within Kochi Prefecture Location within Japan

Kōchi Station (高知駅, Kōchi-eki) is a passenger railway station located in the city center of Kōchi, Kōchi Prefecture, Japan. It is operated by the Shikoku Railway Company (JR Shikoku). In front of the station is Kōchi-Ekimae Station, a tram stop on the Tosaden Kōtsū Sanbashi Line.

== Lines ==
The station is served by JR Shikoku's Dosan Line and is located 126.6 km from the beginning of the line at Tadotsu. It is also 179.3 kilometers from Okayama.

== Station layout ==
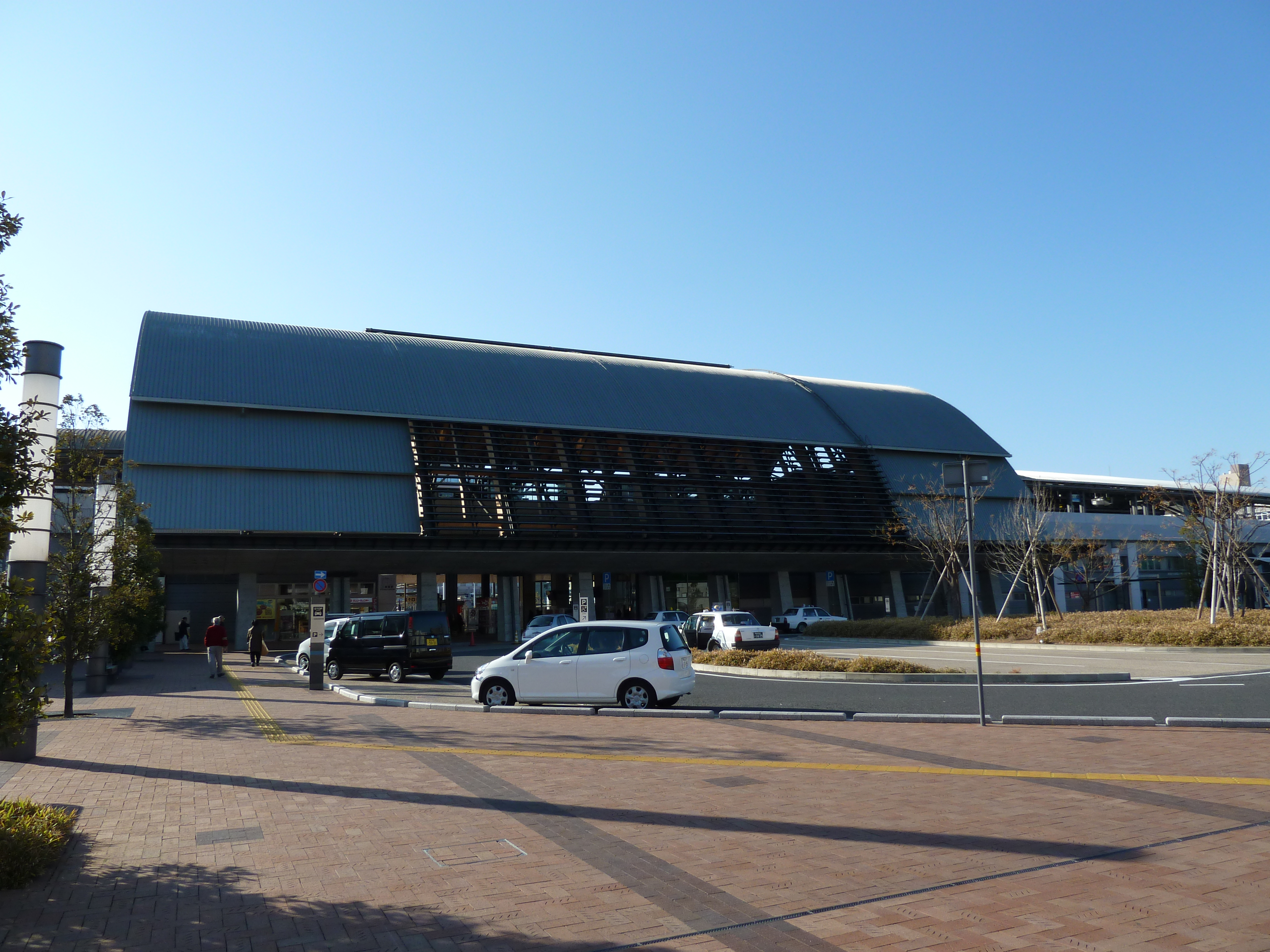
Kōchi Station north exit

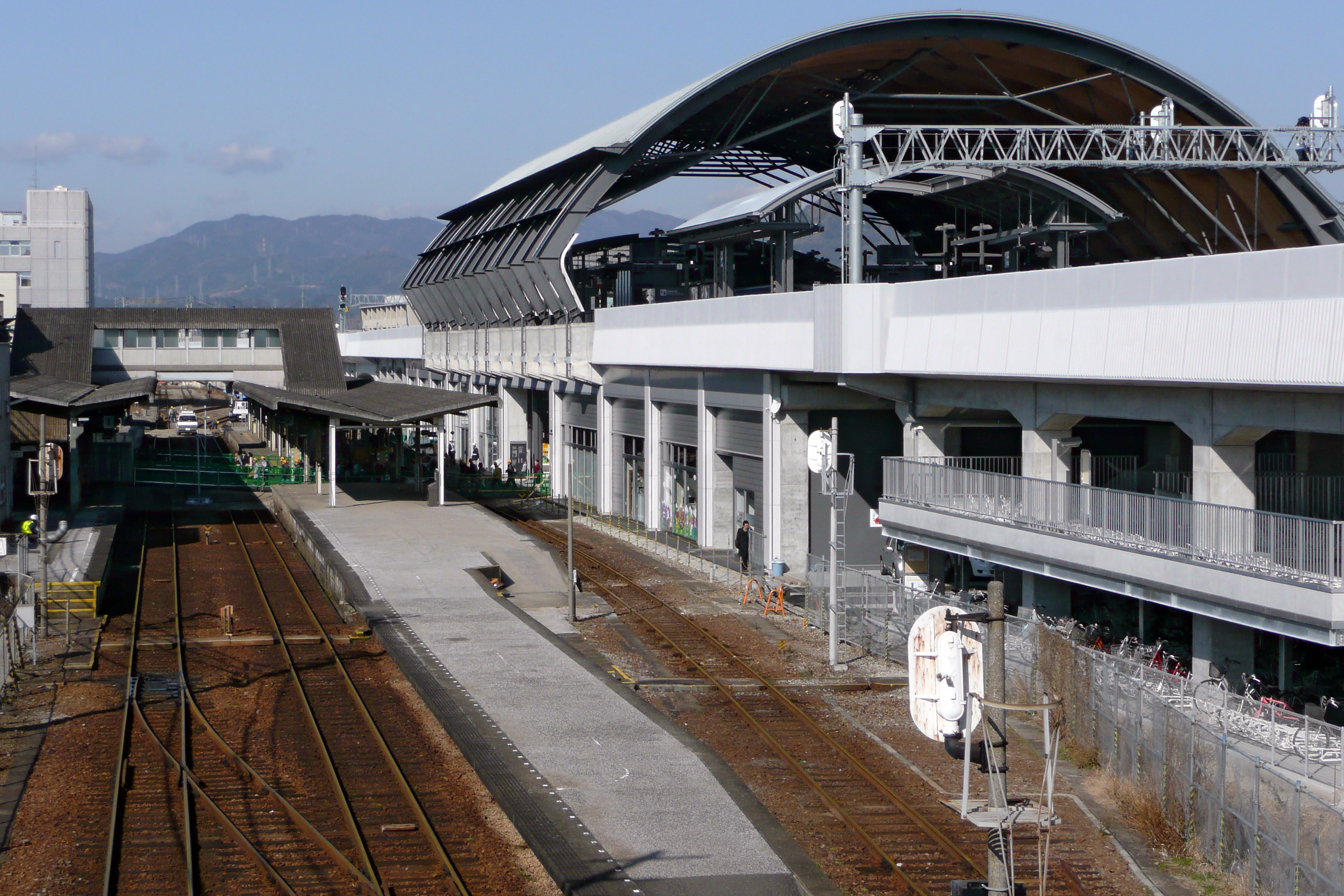
The "Kujira Dome" covering Kōchi Station

Since the completion of the new station building and platforms on February 26, 2008, Kōchi Station has become a raised station with two island platforms served by four tracks.

The new roof covering the station is affectionately referred to as the Kujira Dome (くじらドーム, lit. "Whale Dome"). It received the Landmark Prize at the seventh annual Japanese Railway Awards held by the Ministry of Land, Infrastructure, Transport and Tourism.

| 1 | ■ Dosan Line | Sakawa, Susaki, Kubokawa, Nakamura, Sukumo (mostly limited express trains) |
| 1 | ■ Dosan Line | Gomen, Tosa-Yamada, Awa-Ikeda, Takamatsu, Okayama (limited express trains only) |
| 2 | ■ Dosan Line | Sakawa, Susaki, Kubokawa, Nakamura, Sukumo (mostly local trains) |
| 2 | ■ Dosan Line | Gomen, Tosa-Yamada, Awa-Ikeda, Takamatsu, Okayama (limited express trains only) |
| 3 | ■ Dosan Line | Gomen, Tosa-Yamada, Awa-Ikeda, Takamatsu, Okayama (local trains only) |
| 4 | ■ Dosan Line | Sakawa, Susaki, Kubokawa, Nakamura, Sukumo (local trains only) |
| 4 | ■ Dosan Line | Through service on the Tosa Kuroshio Railway Asa Line for Aki, Nahari (local and rapid trains only) |

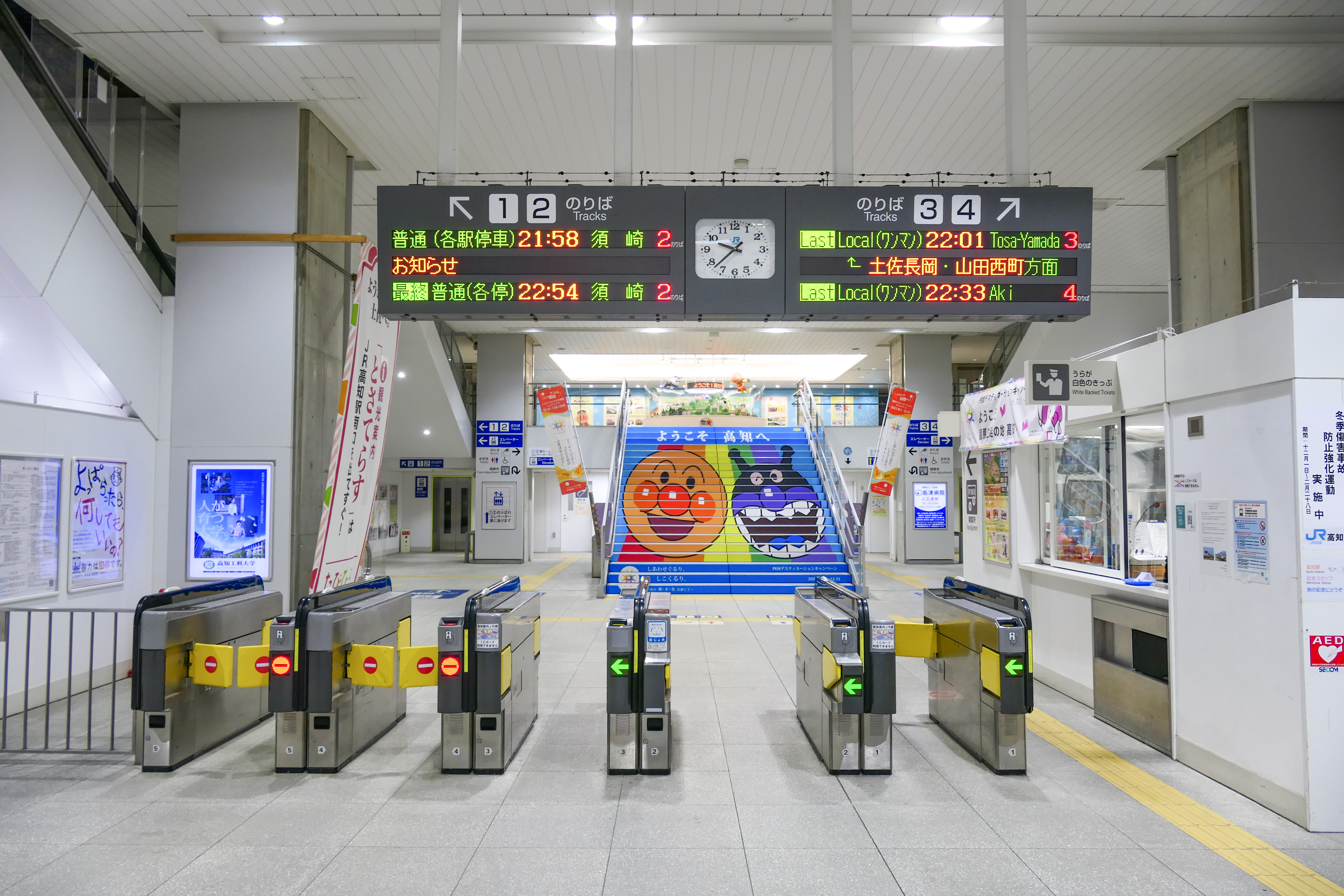
Ticket gate in 2021

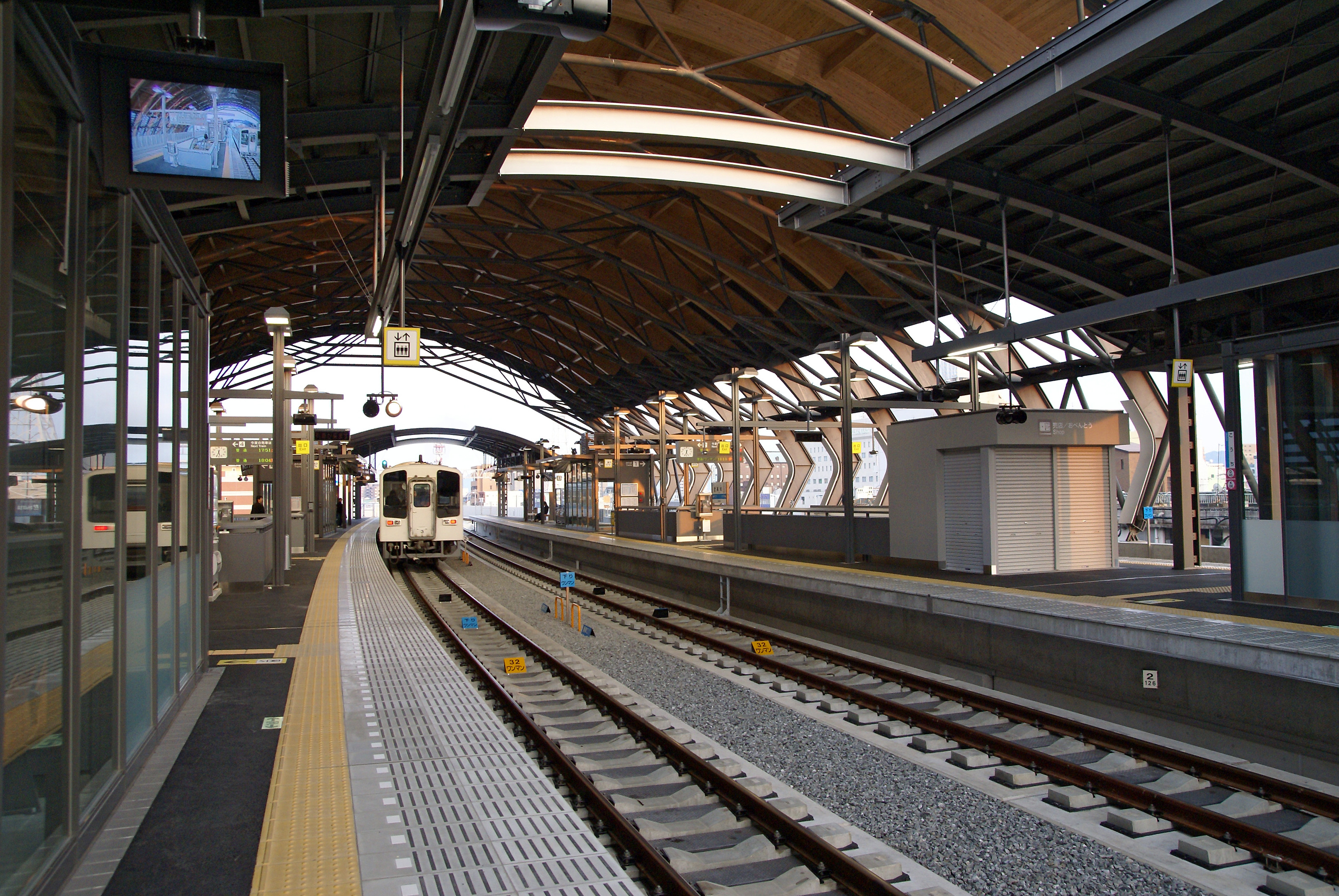
Platforms in 2008

== History ==
The station, one of the key stations of the Shikoku railway network, started operation on November 15, 1924.

The station was redesigned and rebuilt in 2009 by architect Hiroshi Naito.

== Surrounding area ==
- Kochi Tourist Information Center
- Statue of the Three Warriors (Takechi Hanpeita, Sakamoto Ryoma, Nakaoka Shintaro)
- Kochi Red Cross Hospital
- Taiheiyo Gakuen High School)

== See also ==
- List of railway stations in Japan
