= List of cultural properties of Japan – historical materials (Kōchi) =

This list is of the cultural properties of Japan designated in the category of historical materials (歴史資料, rekishi shiryō) for the Prefecture of Kōchi.

== National Cultural Properties ==
As of 1 February 2015, zero Important Cultural Properties have been designated.

== Prefectural Cultural Properties ==
As of 1 May 2014, five properties have been designated at a prefectural level.

Property	Date	Municipality	Ownership	Comments	Image	Coordinates	Ref.
Wish-Granting Jewel from Sōan-ji 宗安禅寺の屋頂宝珠; Sōanzenji no okuchō hōju	1691	Kōchi	Sōan-ji (宗安寺)			33°34′18″N 133°28′42″E	
Plaque Commemorating the Death of Chōsokabe Nobuchika 長宗我部信親公忠死御供之衆鑑板; Chōsokabe Nobuchika kōchū shi otomo no shū kagami ita		Kōchi	Hada Jinja (秦神社)			33°30′05″N 133°32′36″E	
Mandala Honzon Woodblocks 曼荼羅本尊版木 mandara honzon hangi		Nankoku	Hososhō-ji (細勝寺)			33°33′24″N 133°40′03″E	
Materials relating to Ascetic Practices on Mount Yokogura 横倉山修験関係遺品; Yokogura-zan shugen kankei ihin		Ochi	Yokogura-gū (横倉宮), Takaichi Jinja (高市神社), Ōbira Jinja (大毘羅神社)			33°32′12″N 133°14′34″E	
Construction Fuda from the Ninji and Jōwa Eras at Omura Jinja 小村神社の仁治・貞和の棟札; Omura Jinja no Ninji・Jōwa no munefuda	C13/14	Hidaka	Omura Jinja			33°32′35″N 133°23′35″E	

== See also ==
- Cultural Properties of Japan
- List of National Treasures of Japan (historical materials)
- List of Historic Sites of Japan (Kōchi)
- Tosa Province
