= Niyodo River =

River in Shikoku, Japan

Coordinates: 33°27′32.4″N 133°28′49.1″E

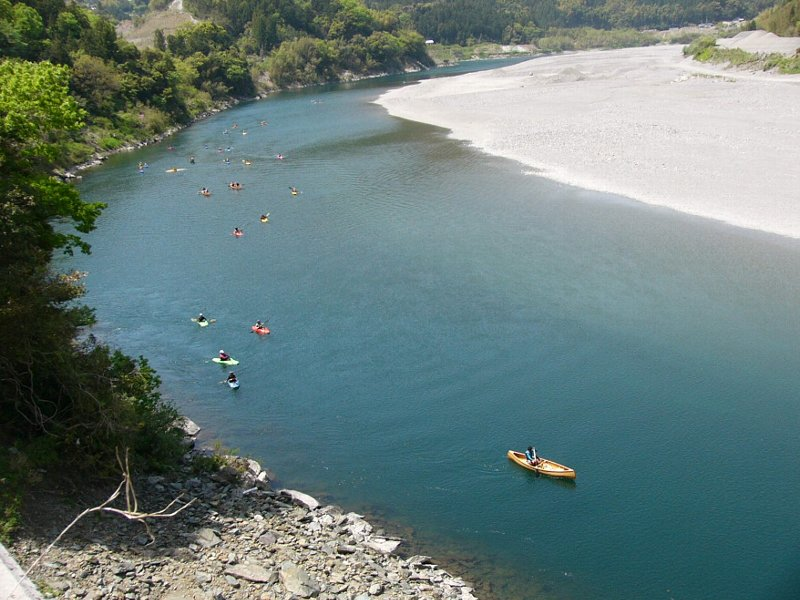
- Niyodo River

- Native name: 仁淀川 (Japanese)

Location
- Country: Japan

Physical characteristics
- Source
  - location: Mount Ishizuchi
  - elevation: 1,982 m (6,503 ft)
- Mouth
  - location: Tosa Bay
- Length: 124 km (77 mi)
- Basin size: 1,560 km^{2} (600 sq mi)

The Niyodo River (仁淀川, Niyodo-gawa) is a Class A river that flows through Ehime and Kōchi Prefectures in Shikoku, Japan.

== Etymology ==
There are various theories as to how the name Niyodo came to be.

- A theory posits that when Prince Takaoka, the son of Emperor Heizei, came to Tosa Province, he named it "Niyodo" because it resembled the Yodo River in Yamashiro Province.
- Another theory regards a story in the Engishiki. Nietono was a kitchen in the imperial court where tributes such as fish were presented from various provinces, including Tosa. The name was later changed from Nietonogawa to Niyodogawa.
- Yet another theory states that since ancient times, the Niyodo River was called "Miwagawa" (三輪川, lit. Divine River) because sake to be offered to the great gods was brewed in this river, and it is said that it eventually became Niyodogawa.

== Geography ==
The Niyodo River rises from the confluence of the Omo and Kuma Rivers. The Omo River, which originates from Mount Ishizuchi, and the Kuma River, which flows from the Misaka Pass, join together in Mimido (Kumakōgen, Ehime) to form the Niyodo. The river then flows south, carving a deep valley in the Shikoku Mountains, and eventually empties into the Pacific Ocean near the cities of Kōchi and Tosa. National Route 33, which connects Matsuyama and Kōchi, runs parallel to the section from Misaka Pass through Mimido to Ochi.

The river is known for its good water quality. In July 2012, it topped a central government-released national ranking of river water quality.

=== Damming ===
Dams on the Niyodo River and its tributaries include:

- Odo Dam (administered by the Shikoku Regional Development Bureau)
- Ikadatsu Dam (administered by the Shikoku Regional Development Bureau)
- Omo Dam No. 3 (administered by Shikoku Electric Power)

== Tourism ==
The Niyodo River is visited by many tourists for the beauty of its clear blue color. Tourist activities include camping, fishing, biking, and various festivals. Popular sightseeing locations along the river include:

- Nakatsu Gorge (Niyodogawa, Kōchi)
- Yasui Valley (Niyodogawa, Kōchi)
- Niko-buchi (Ino, Kōchi)

The Shikoku Tosa Toki no Yoake no Monogatari sightseeing train also runs briefly along the river, allowing passengers to view it from its cars.

== Gallery ==
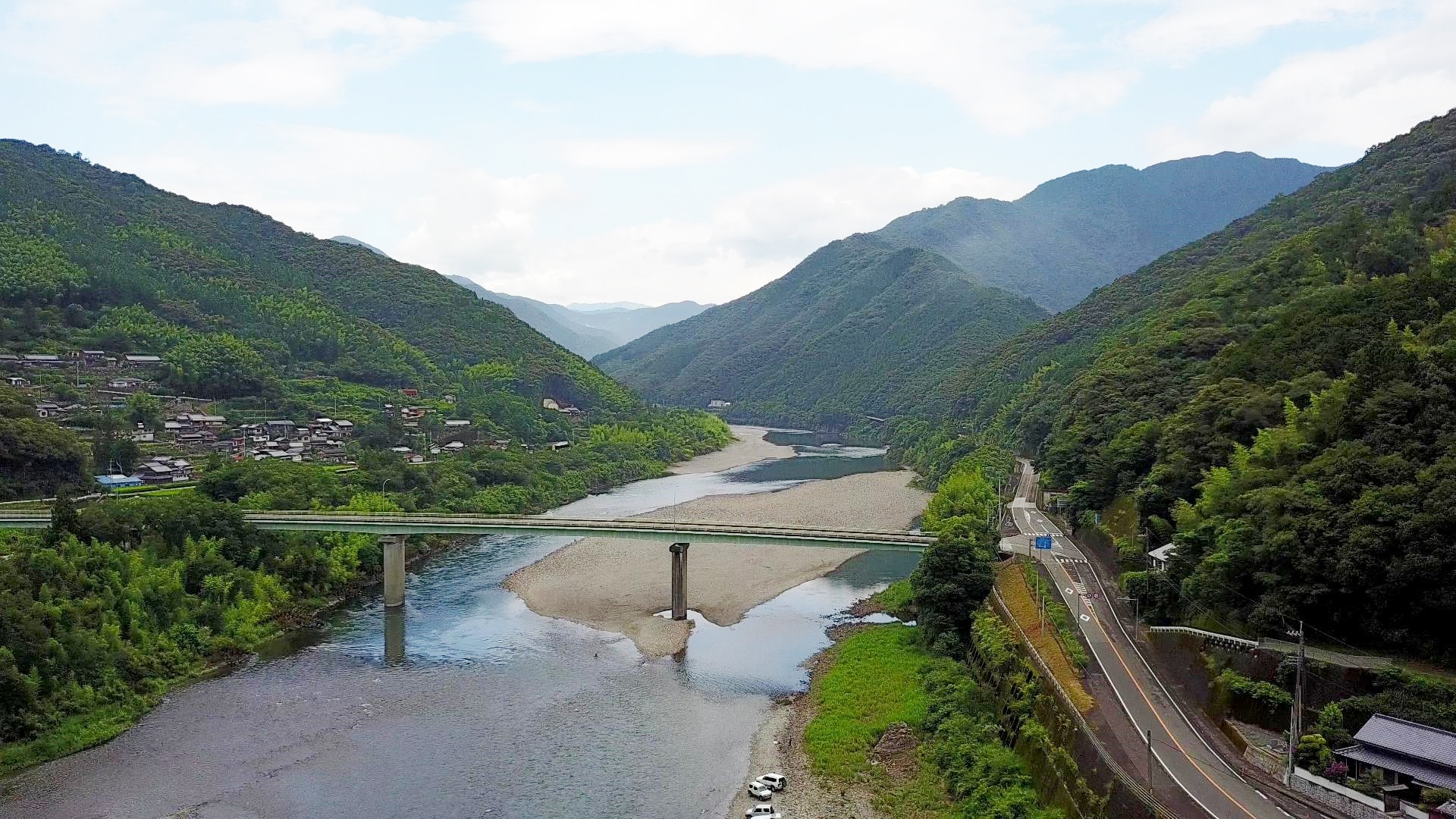
Aerial photo of Yanase Bridge over Niyodo River

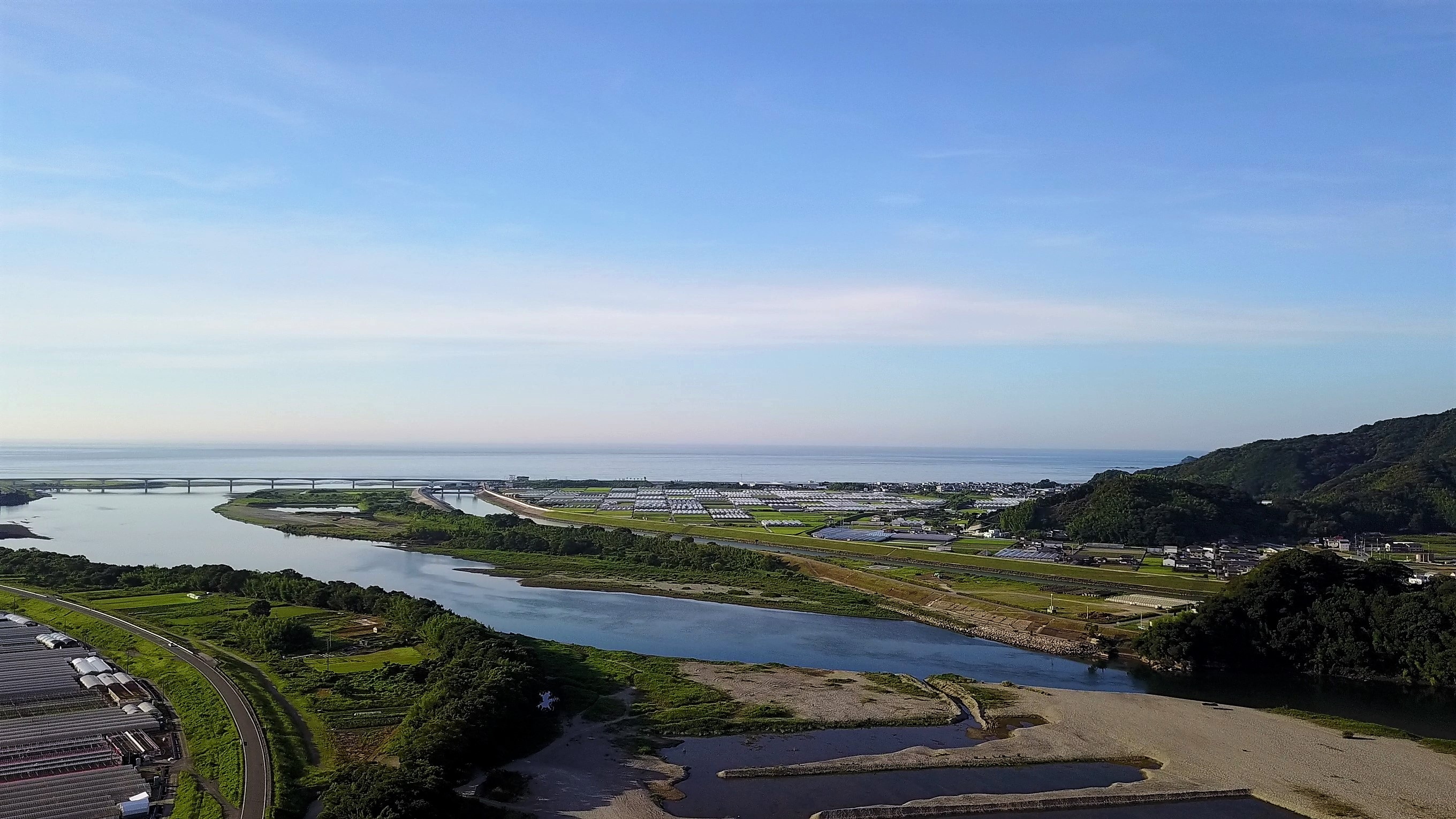
The river's mouth near Haruno

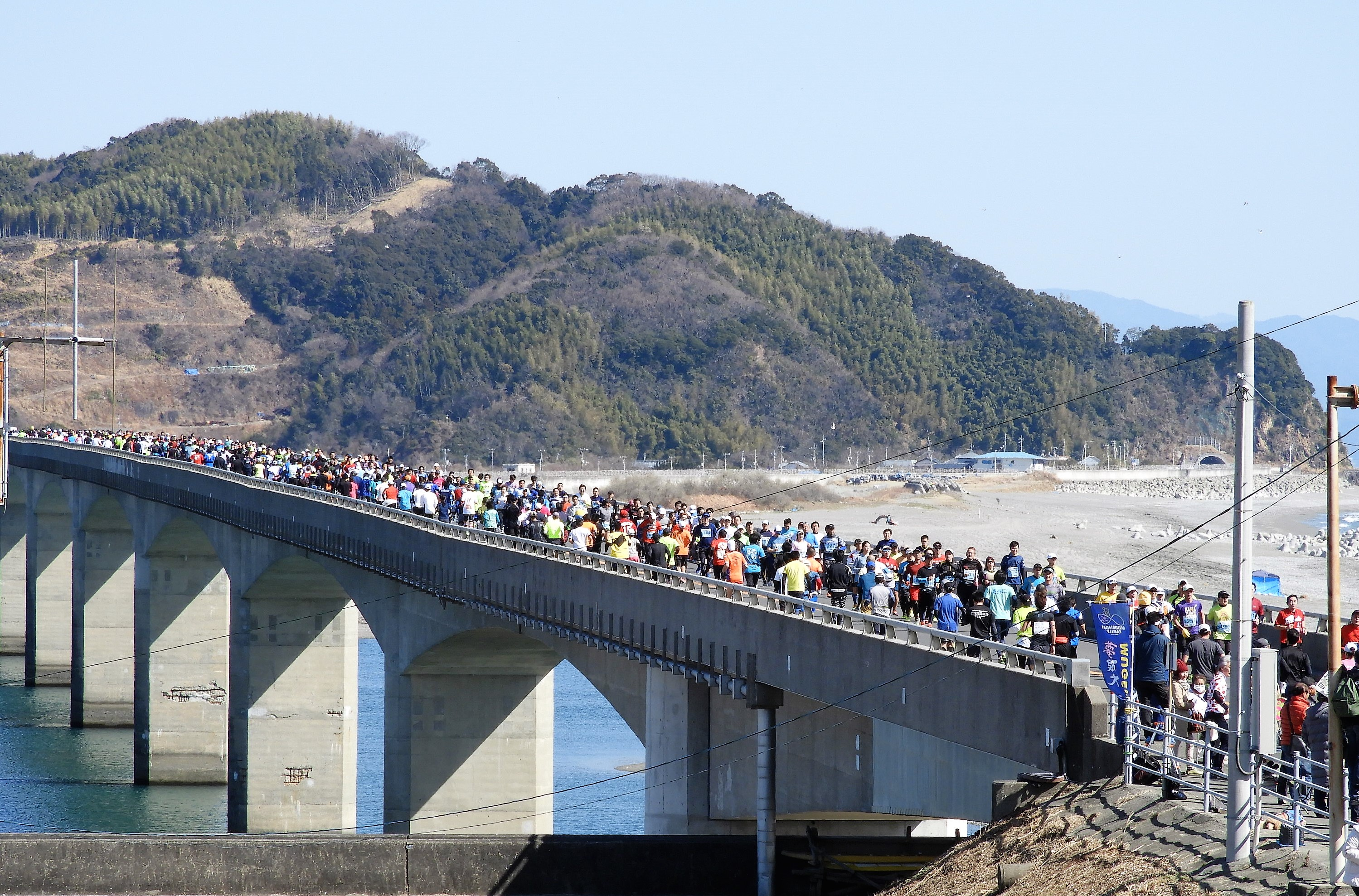
The annual Ryōma Marathon crosses Niyodo Estuary Bridge in 2018. The bridge connects the cities of Tosa and Kōchi.
