= Tosa-Kamo Station =

Railway station in Sakawa, Kōchi Prefecture, Japan

Tosa-Kamo Station 土佐加茂駅
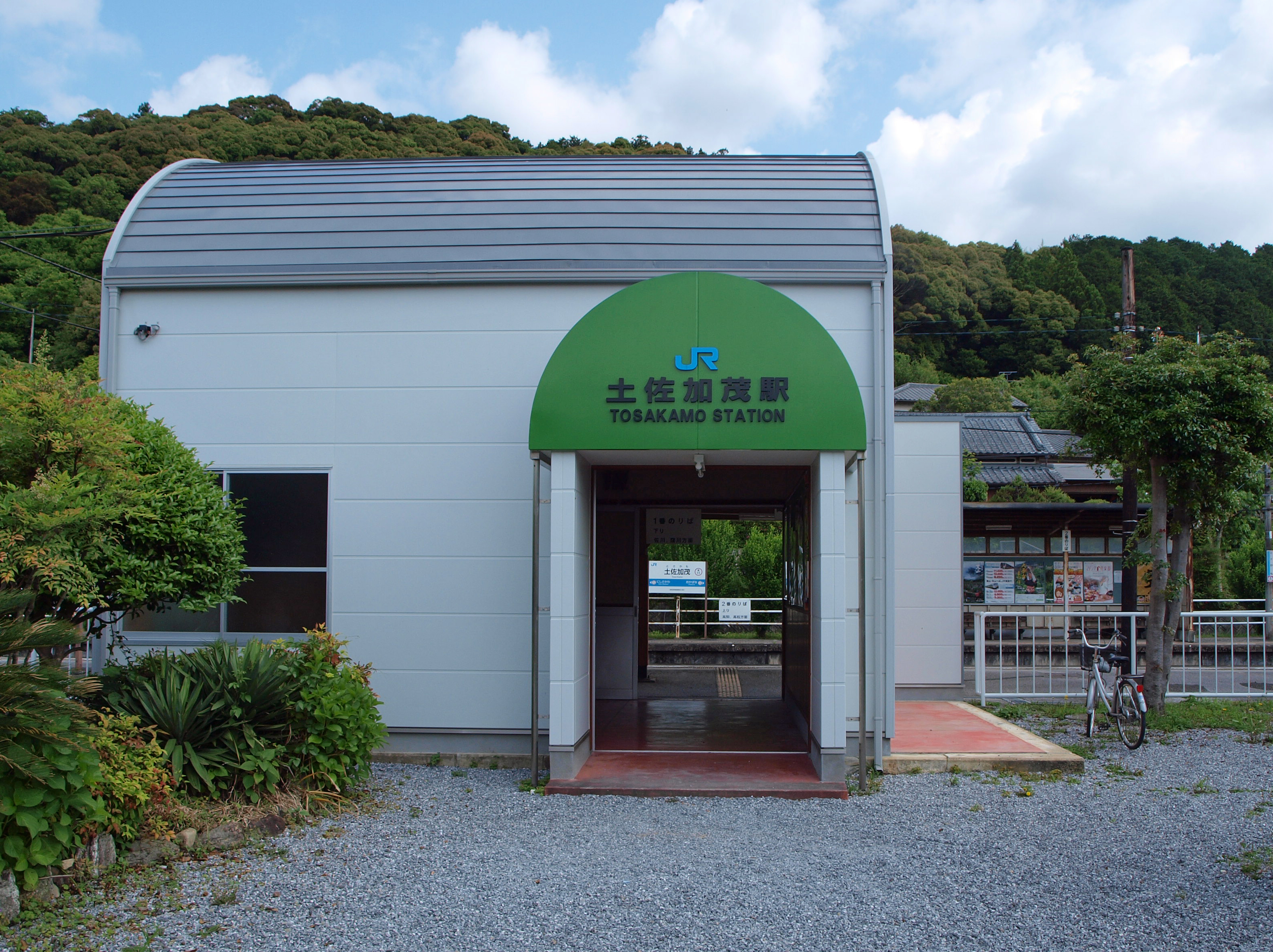
- Tosa-Kamo Station in 2010

General information
- Location: Kamo, Sakawa, Takaoka-gun, Kōchi-ken 789-1204; Japan
- Coordinates: 33°31′25″N 133°19′16″E
- Operator: JR Shikoku
- Line: ■ Dosan Line
- Distance: 148.6 km from Tadotsu
- Platforms: 2 side platforms
- Tracks: 2

Construction
- Accessible: Yes - platforms linked by level crossing and ramps

Other information
- Status: Unstaffed
- Station code: K11

History
- Opened: 30 March 1924

Passengers
- FY2018: 152
Location
- Location within Kochi Prefecture Location within Japan

Tosa-Kamo Station (土佐加茂駅, Tosa-Kamo-eki) is a passenger railway station located in the town of Sakawa, Takaoka District, Kōchi Prefecture, Japan. It is operated by JR Shikoku and has the station number "K11".

== Lines ==
The station is served by JR Shikoku's Dosan Line and is located 148.6 km from the beginning of the line at Tadotsu.

== Layout ==
The station consists of two opposed side platforms serving two tracks. A station building, which is unstaffed, serves as a waiting room. A level crossing with ramps connects both side platforms.

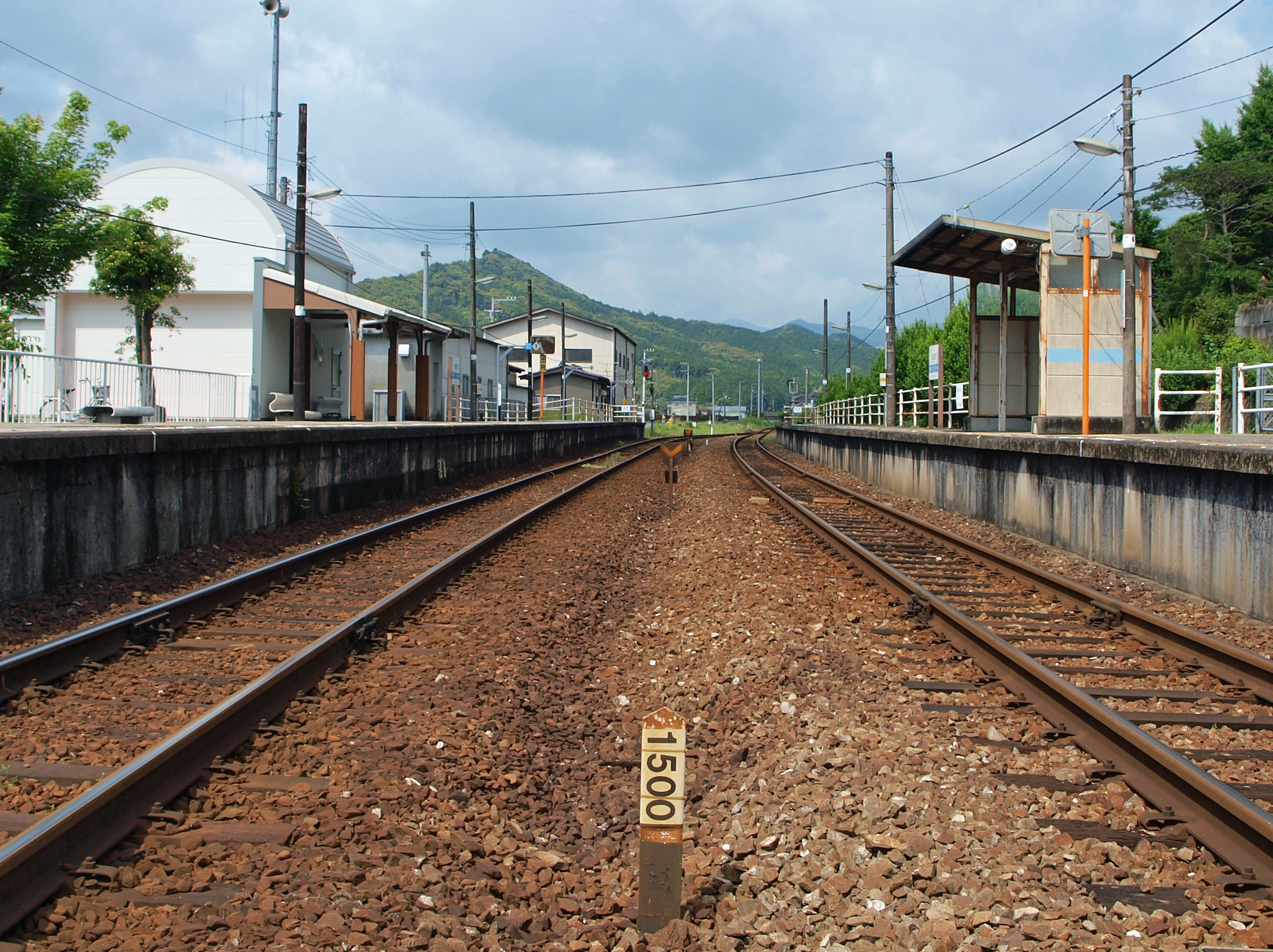
View of the station platforms in 2010 looking in the direction of Susaki

== Adjacent stations ==
«	Service	»
Dosan Line
Okabana	Local	Nishi-Sakawa

== History ==
The station opened on 30 March 1924 when the then Kōchi Line (later renamed the Dosan Line) was constructed from Susaki to Kusaka. At this time the station was operated by Japanese Government Railways, later becoming Japanese National Railways (JNR). With the privatization of JNR on 1 April 1987, control of the station passed to JR Shikoku.

== Surrounding area ==
- Kamo Elementary and Junior High School

== See also ==
- List of railway stations in Japan
