= Agawa District, Kōchi =

District in Kōchi Prefecture, Japan

Coordinates: 33.574752°N 133.167096°E

Agawa (吾川郡, Agawa-gun) is a district located in Kōchi Prefecture, Japan. As of October 10, 2018, the district has an estimated population of 26,601 and a density of 33.09 persons per km^{2}. The total area is 803.67 km^{2}.

== Towns and villages ==
- Ino
- Niyodogawa

== Mergers ==
- On October 1, 2004 the village of Gohoku, along with the village of Hongawa, from Tosa District, merged into the expanded town of Ino.
- On August 1, 2005 the town of Ikegawa, and the village of Agawa merged with the village of Niyodo, from Takaoka District, to form the new town of Niyodogawa.
- On January 1, 2008 the town of Haruno merged into the expanded city of Kōchi.
