= Niyodo, Kōchi =

Dissolved municipality in Kōchi prefecture, Japan

Niyodo (仁淀村, Niyodo-mura) was a village located in Takaoka District, Kōchi Prefecture, Japan.

As of 2003, the village had an estimated population of 2,533 and a density of 23.86 persons per km^{2}. The total area was 106.16 km^{2}.

On August 1, 2005, Niyodo, along with the town of Ikegawa, and the village of Agawa (both from Agawa District), was merged to create the town of Niyodogawa (in Agawa District), and no longer exists as an independent municipality.
