= Okabana Station =

Railway station in Hidaka, Kōchi Prefecture, Japan

Okabana Station 岡花駅
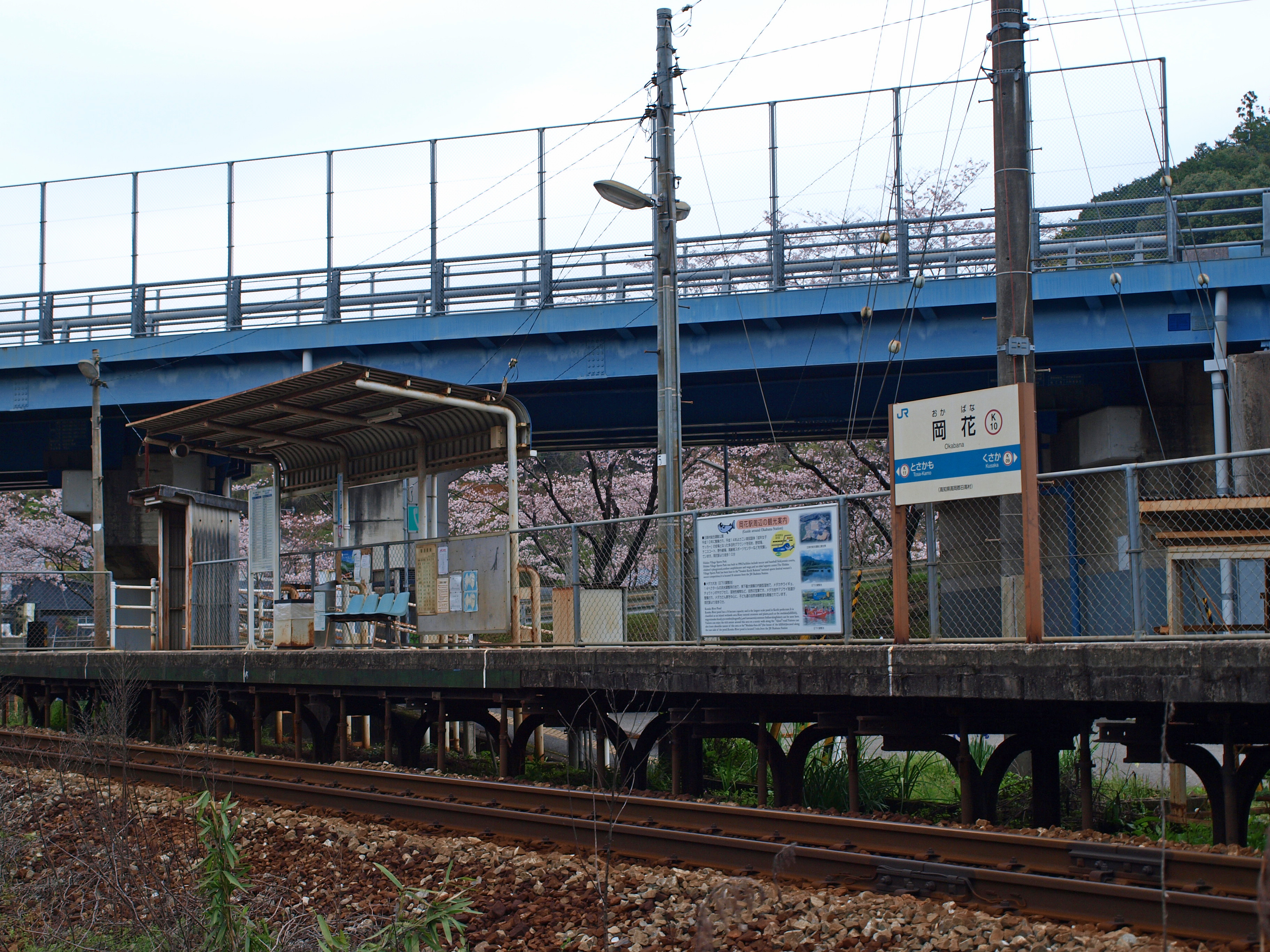
- Okabana Station in 2010

General information
- Location: Hongo, Hidaka, Takaoka-gun, Kōchi-ken 781-2153; Japan
- Coordinates: 33°31′47″N 133°21′05″E
- Operator: JR Shikoku
- Line: ■ Dosan Line
- Distance: 148.6 km from Tadotsu
- Platforms: 1 side platform
- Tracks: 1

Construction
- Accessible: Yes - ramp leads up to platform

Other information
- Status: Unstaffed
- Station code: K10

History
- Opened: 20 August 1960

Passengers
- FY2018: 126
Location
- Location within Kochi Prefecture Location within Japan

Okabana Station (岡花駅, Okabana-eki) is a passenger railway station located in the village of Hidaka, Takaoka District, Kōchi Prefecture, Japan. It is operated by JR Shikoku and has the station number "K10".

== Lines ==
The station is served by JR Shikoku's Dosan Line and is located 145.7 km from the beginning of the line at Tadotsu.

== Layout ==
The station consists of a side platform serving a single track. There is no station building, only a weather shelter on the platform for waiting passengers. A ramp leads up to the platform from the access road.

== Adjacent stations ==
«	Service	»
JR Shikoku
Dosan Line
Kusaka	Local	Tosa-Kamo

== History ==
Okabana Station opened on 20 August 1960 as a new stop on the existing Dosan Line. At this time the station was operated by Japanese National Railways (JNR). With the privatization of JNR on 1 April 1987, control of the station passed to JR Shikoku.

== Surrounding area ==
- Kusaka River
- Japan National Route 33

== See also ==
- List of railway stations in Japan
