= Niyodogawa =

Niyodogawa 仁淀川町
- Town
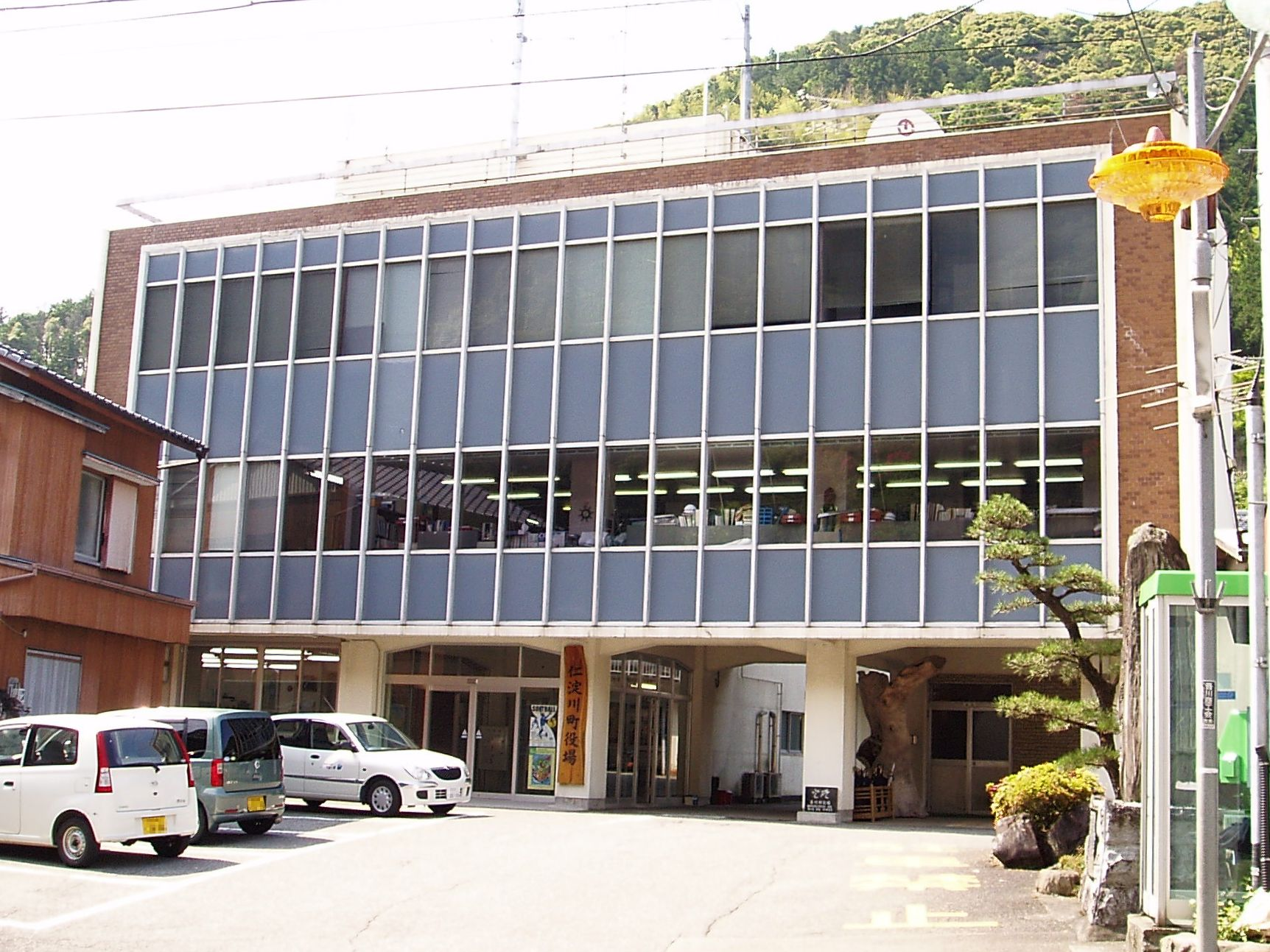
- Niyodogawa Town Hall

- Flag Chapter
- Location of Niyodogawa in Kōchi Prefecture

- Location in Japan
- Coordinates: 33°35′N 133°10′E
- Country: Japan
- Region: Shikoku
- Prefecture: Kōchi
- District: Agawa

Area
  - Total: 333.00 km^{2} (128.57 sq mi)

Population (August 1, 2022)
  - Total: 4,861
  - Density: 14.60/km^{2} (37.81/sq mi)
- Time zone: UTC+09:00 (JST)
- City hall address: 200 Osaki, Niyodogawa-chō, Agawa-gun, Kōchi-ken 781-1592
- Website: Official website

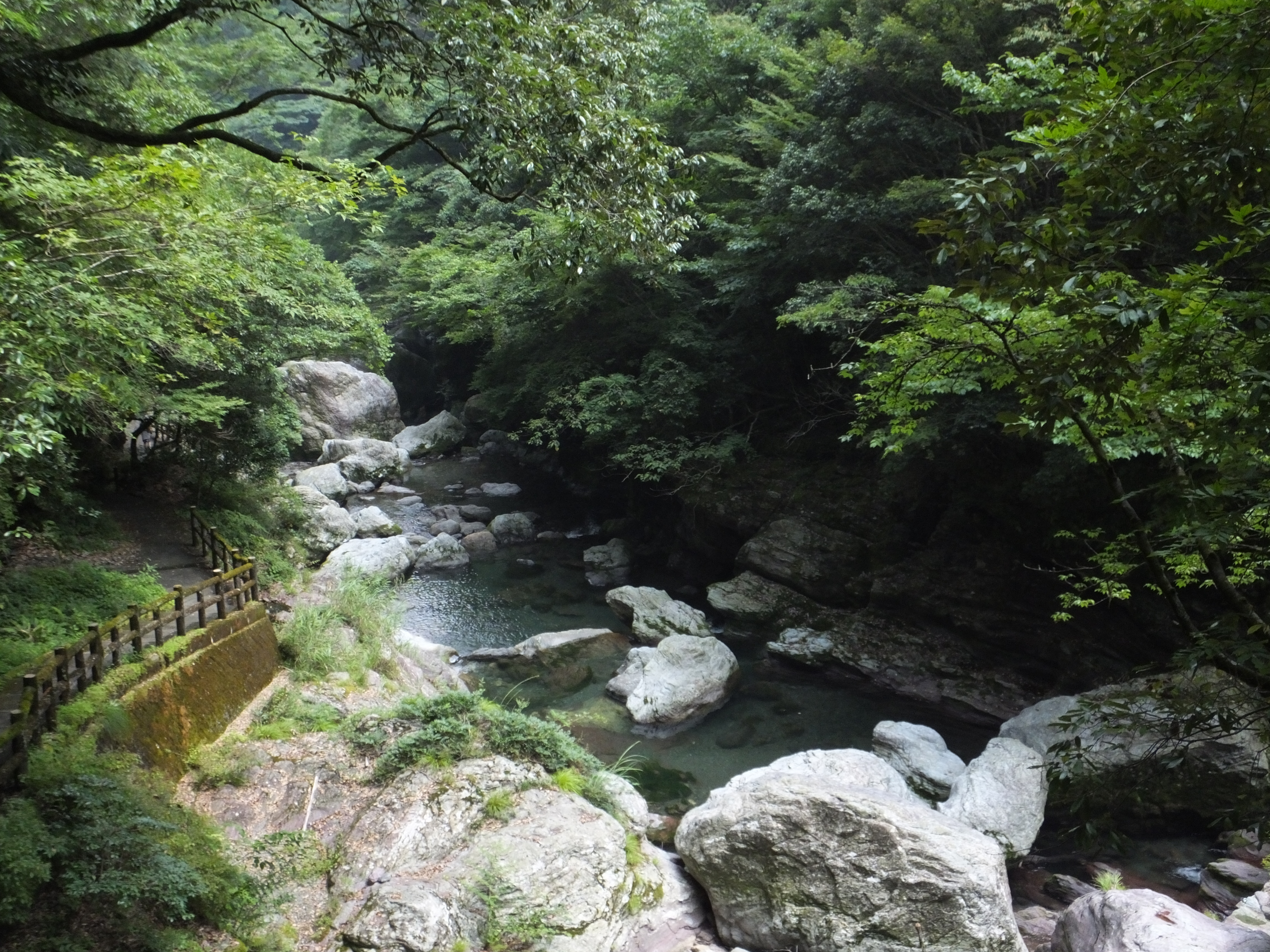
Nakatsu Gorge

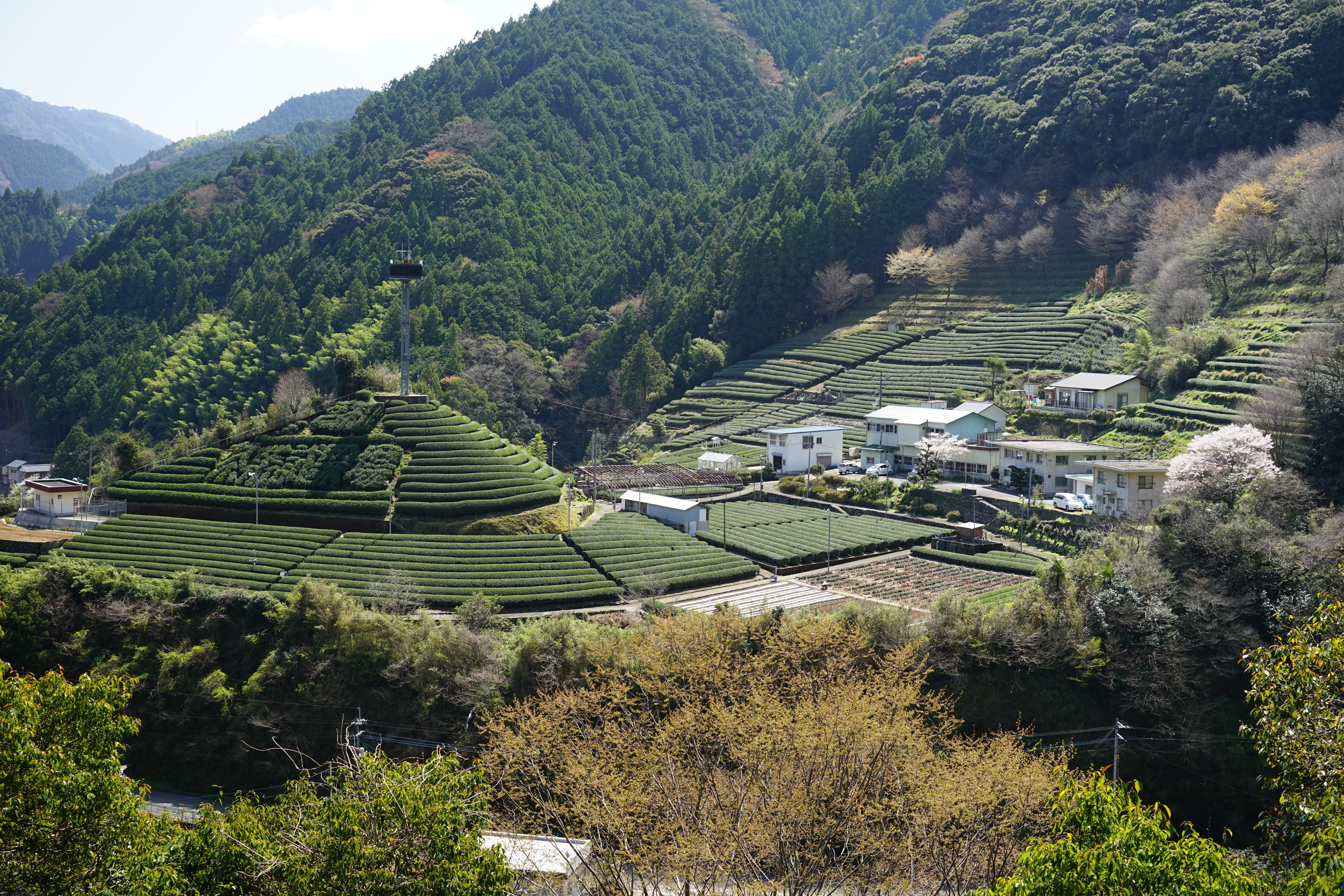
Tea plantations in Niyodogawa

Niyodogawa (仁淀川町, Niyodogawa-chō) is a town located in Agawa District, Kōchi Prefecture, Japan. As of 1 August 2022, the town had an estimated population of 4‚861 in 2,788 households and a population density of 15 persons per km^{2}. The total area of the town is 333.0 square kilometres (128.6 sq mi).

== Geography ==
Niyodogawa is located in the Shikoku Mountains of north-central Kōchi Prefecture on the upper reaches of the Niyodo River.

=== Neighbouring municipalities ===
Ehime Prefecture

- Kumakōgen

Kōchi Prefecture

- Ino
- Ochi
- Tsuno

=== Climate ===
Niyodogawa has a humid subtropical climate (Köppen Cfa) characterized by warm summers and cool winters with light snowfall. The average annual temperature in Niyodogawa is 13.3 °C. The average annual rainfall is 2688 mm with September as the wettest month. The temperatures are highest on average in August, at around 24.1 °C, and lowest in January, at around 2.1 °C.

== Demographics ==
Per Japanese census data, the population of Niyodogawa has decreased precipitously since the 1950s and is now less than a quarter of what it was a century ago.

Historical population
Year	Pop.	±%
1920	22,503	—
1930	23,063	+2.5%
1940	24,479	+6.1%
1950	26,067	+6.5%
1960	20,783	−20.3%
1970	13,736	−33.9%
1980	11,672	−15.0%
1990	9,518	−18.5%
2000	8,189	−14.0%
2010	6,500	−20.6%
2020	4,827	−25.7%

== History ==
As with all of Kōchi Prefecture, the area of Niyodogawa was part of ancient Tosa Province. During the Edo period, the area was part of the holdings of Tosa Domain ruled by the Yamauchi clan from their seat at Kōchi Castle. Following the Meiji Restoration, the village of Ikegawa was established within Agawa District, Kōchi with the creation of the modern municipalities system on October 1, 1889. Ikegawa was raised to town status on April 1, 1913. On August 1, 2005, the town of Ikegawa and the village of Agawa, both from Agawa District, and the village of Niyodo, from Takaoka District were merged to form the town of Niyodogawa.

== Government ==
Niyodogawa has a mayor-council form of government with a directly elected mayor and a unicameral town council of five members. Niyodogawa, together with the municipalities of Agawa District, contributes two members to the Kōchi Prefectural Assembly. In terms of national politics, the town is part of Kōchi 2nd district of the lower house of the Diet of Japan.

== Economy ==
Traditionally, agriculture, forestry and limestone mining were mainstays of the local economy. The area is noted for its production of Tosa Tea, a variety of green tea.

== Education ==
Niyodogawa has three public elementary schools and two public middle schools operated by the town government. The town does not have a high school.

== Transportation ==
=== Railway ===
The town does not have any passenger railway service. The nearest train station is Nishi-Sakawa Station on the JR Shikoku Dosan Line.

=== Highways ===
- National Route 33
- National Route 439
- National Route 494

== Local attractions ==
The most popular festival held in Niyodogawa is the Akiba Matsuri, held annually on February 11. A day long procession up a hillside to the Akiba Jinja, it features elaborate costumes, a highly choreographed march and focuses on the tossing of long wooden poles topped with the tail feathers of Onagadori, the famous long tailed roosters of Kōchi Prefecture. Often designated as one of the three major festivals in the Kōchi festival calendar, it is the one occasion where many former residents of the town return to participate, particularly important for a small town ravaged by depopulation.

Niyodogawa has two popular nature spots, Nakatsu Gorge and Yasui Valley. Nakatsu Gorge has a walking path to Uryu Falls. It has more dramatic views of the rock walls that make up the gorge. It has also become a spot for canyoning. There is a public hot bath at a small hotel called Yunomori. Yasui Valley has more waterfalls to explore. It also has some cottages to rent. Tourists come to Yasui Valley to see "Niyodo Blue," an iridescent blue color that is best observed when the sun hits the river at a low angle. Another spot to see "Niyodo Blue" is at Nikobuchi Falls in neighboring Ino Town.
