= Hongawa, Kōchi =

Dissolved municipality in Kōchi prefecture, Japan

Hongawa (本川村, Hongawa-mura) was a village located in Agawa District, Kōchi Prefecture, Japan.

As of 2003, the village had an estimated population of 749 and a density of 3.59 persons per km^{2}. The total area was 208.70 km^{2}.

On October 1, 2004, Hongawa, along with the village of Gohoku (from Agawa District), was merged into the expanded town of Ino, and no longer exists as an independent municipality.
