= Hidaka, Kōchi =

Hidaka 日高村
- Village
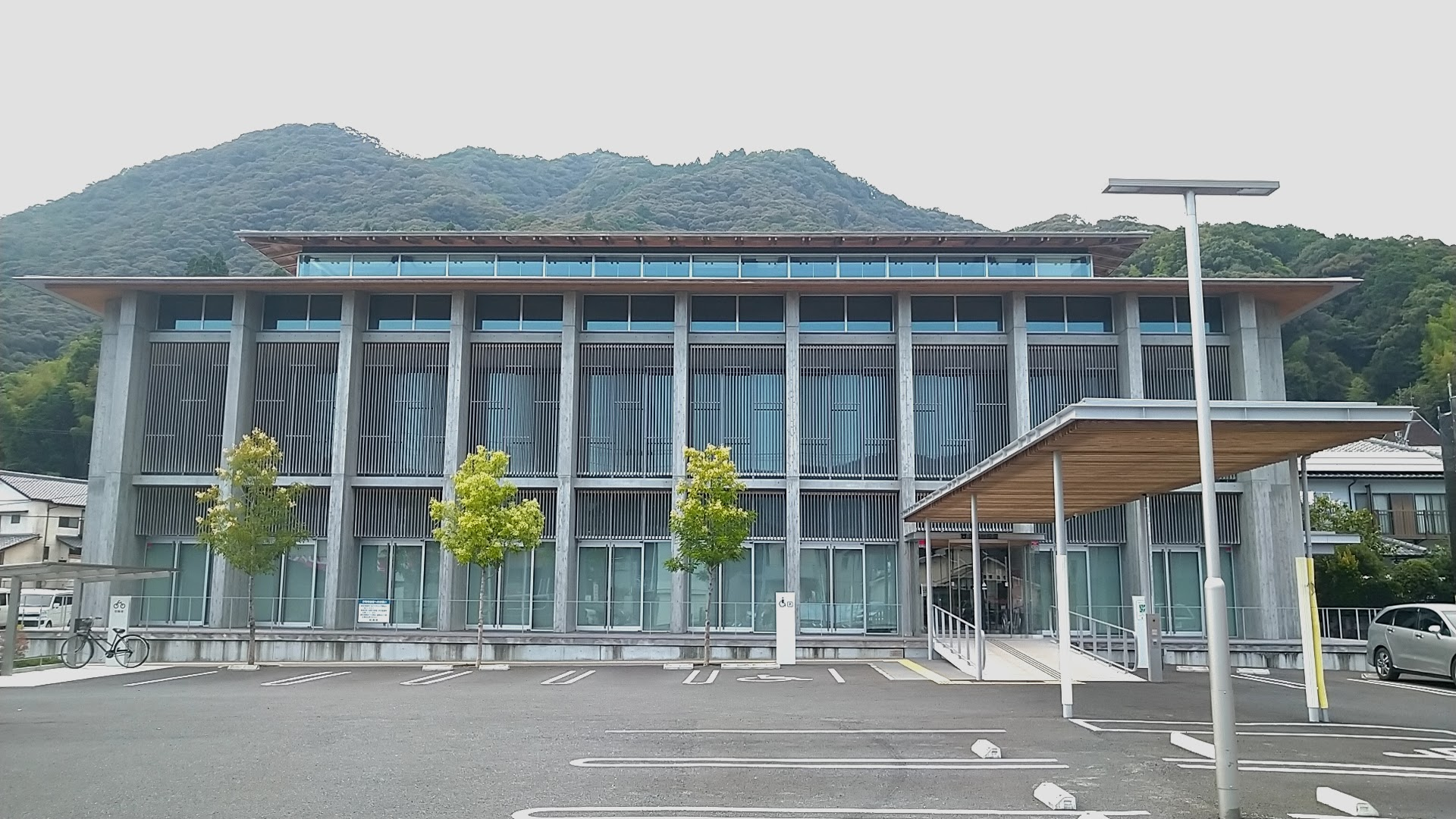
- Hidaka village office

- Flag Chapter
- Interactive map of Hidaka
- Location in Japan
- Coordinates: 33°32′N 133°22′E
- Country: Japan
- Region: Shikoku
- Prefecture: Kōchi
- District: Takaoka

Area
  - Total: 44.85 km^{2} (17.32 sq mi)

Population (September 31, 2024)
  - Total: 4,725
  - Density: 105.4/km^{2} (272.9/sq mi)
- Time zone: UTC+09:00 (JST)
- City hall address: 61-1 Hongō, Hidaka-mura, Takaoka-gun, Kōchi ken 781 - 2153
- Website: Official website

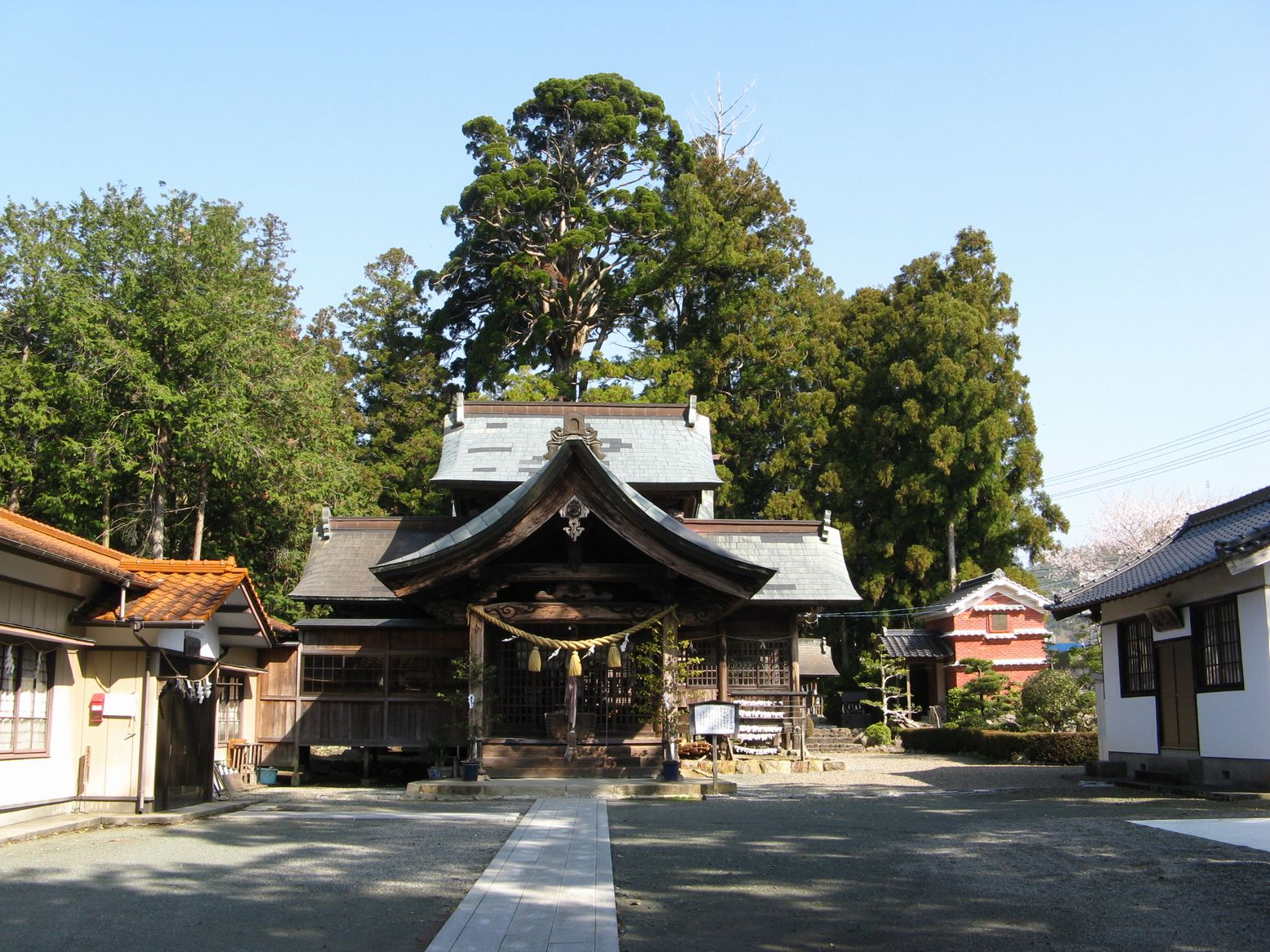
Omura Shrine

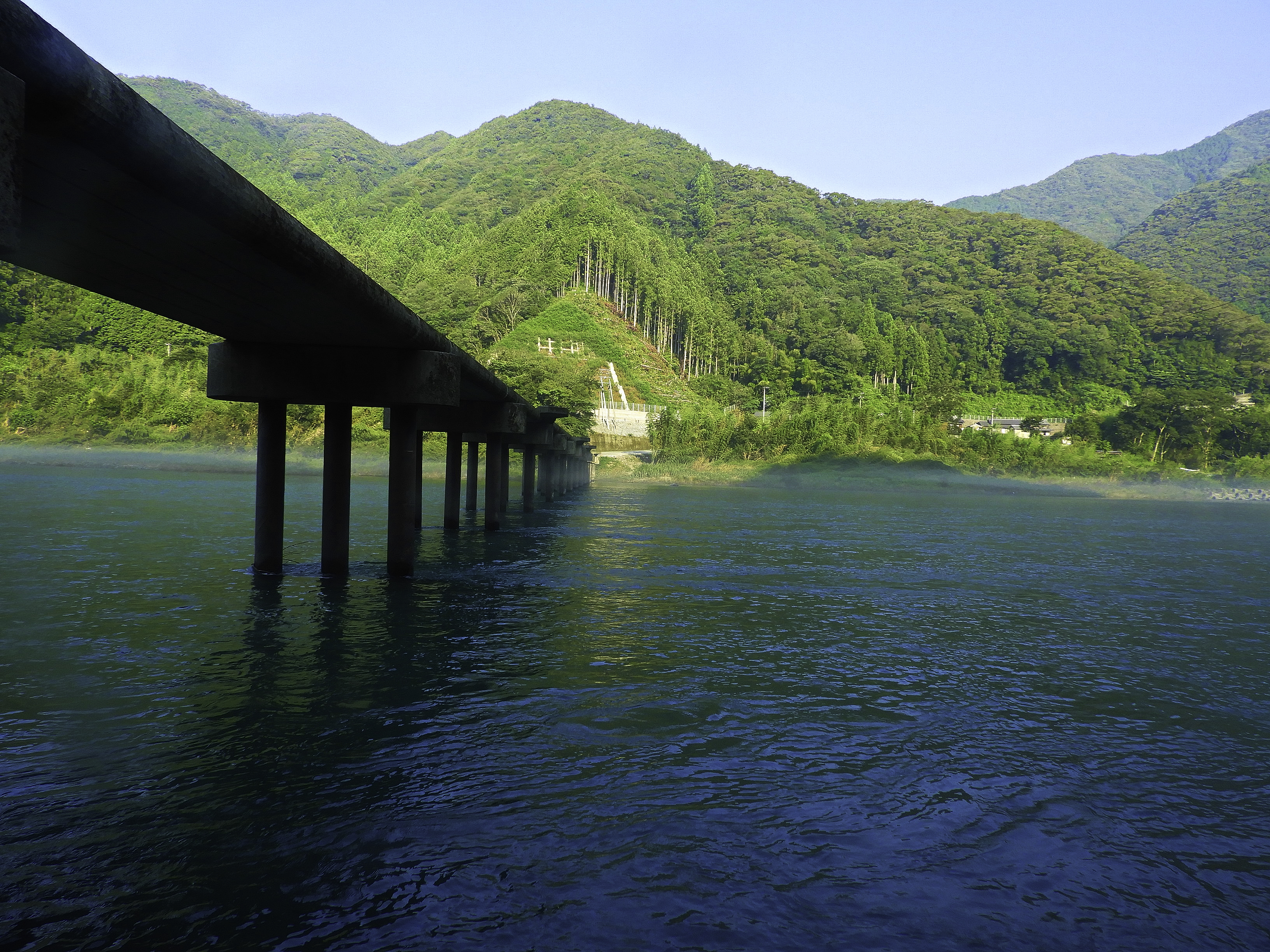
Niyodo River

Hidaka (日高村, Hidaka-mura) is a village located in Takaoka District, Kōchi Prefecture, Japan. As of 31 July 2022, the village had an estimated population of 4,871 in 2451 households and a population density of 110 persons per km^{2}. The total area of the village is 44.85 square kilometres (17.32 sq mi).

== Geography ==
Hidaka is located in central Kōchi Prefecture on the island of Shikoku, about 16 kilometers west of Kōchi City, the prefectural capital. The entire village is in the basin of the Niyodo River and its tributaries. The Niyodo River runs along the border with Ino Town on the north. The northern and southern parts of the village are mountains, and the center of the village area is a basin. The Kusaka River, a tributary of the Niyodo River, flows through this area, which contains the main urban area.

=== Neighbouring municipalities ===
Kōchi Prefecture

- Ino
- Ochi
- Tosa

=== Climate ===
Hidaka has a humid subtropical climate (Köppen Cfa) characterized by warm summers and cool winters with light snowfall. The average annual temperature in Hidaka is 15.9 °C. The average annual rainfall is 2688 mm with September as the wettest month. The temperatures are highest on average in August, at around 25.9 °C, and lowest in January, at around 5.8 °C.

== Demographics ==
Per Japanese census data, the population of Hidaka has been decreasing steadily since the 1950s.

Historical population
Year	Pop.	±%
1950	8,181	—
1960	7,079	−13.5%
1970	6,232	−12.0%
1980	6,100	−2.1%
1990	6,223	+2.0%
2000	5,968	−4.1%
2010	5,447	−8.7%
2020	4,812	−11.7%

== History ==
As with all of Kōchi Prefecture, the area of Hidaka was part of ancient Tosa Province. During the Edo period, the area was part of the holdings of Tosa Domain ruled by the Yamauchi clan from their seat at Kōchi Castle. The villages of Kusaka (日下村) and Nōzu (能津村) were established with the creation of the modern municipalities system on October 1, 1889. The two villages merged, together with a portion of the village of Kamo (加茂村) on February 10, 1955, to form the village of Hidaka.

== Government ==
Hidaka has a mayor-council form of government with a directly elected mayor and a unicameral village council of ten members. Hidaka, together with the municipalities of Sakawa and Ochi, contributes one member to the Kōchi Prefectural Assembly. In terms of national politics, the village is part of Kōchi 2nd district of the lower house of the Diet of Japan.

== Economy ==
Hidaka's economy is centered on agriculture, notably growing cherry tomatoes, and the production of imo kenpi.

== Education ==
Hidaka has three public elementary schools and two public middle schools operated by the village government. The village does not have a high school. The Kōchi Prefecture Board of Education operates one special education school for the handicapped.

== Transportation ==
=== Railway ===
Shikoku Railway Company - Dosan Line

- Omurajinjamae - Kusaka - Okabana

=== Highways ===
- National Route 33

== Local attractions ==
- Omura Shrine in Hidaka holds a late Kofun period sword designated as a National Treasure and two Heian period wooden masks of Bodhisattva which are Important Cultural Properties.
- There are two mountain top golf courses on Nishiki-yama.

== Local culture ==
The village mascot is named Mohei, after a historical ninja from the village whose name was Kusaka Mohei. According to local legend, now written into various story books, the ninja trained under the guidance of a tengu in Saruda cave and gained magical powers such as turning into a mouse.
