= Ikegawa, Kōchi =

Japanese town

Ikegawa (池川町, Ikegawa-chō) was a town located in Agawa District, Kōchi Prefecture, Japan.

As of 2003, the town had an estimated population of 2,316 and a density of 16.23/km^{2} (42.0/sq mi). The total area was 142.68 km^{2} (55.09 sq mi).

On August 1, 2005, Ikegawa, along with the village of Agawa (also from Agawa District), and the village of Niyodo (from Takaoka District), was merged to create the town of Niyodogawa (in Agawa District), and no longer exists as an independent municipality.
