= Omurajinjamae Station =

Railway station in Hidaka, Kōchi Prefecture, Japan

Omurajinjamae Station 小村神社前駅
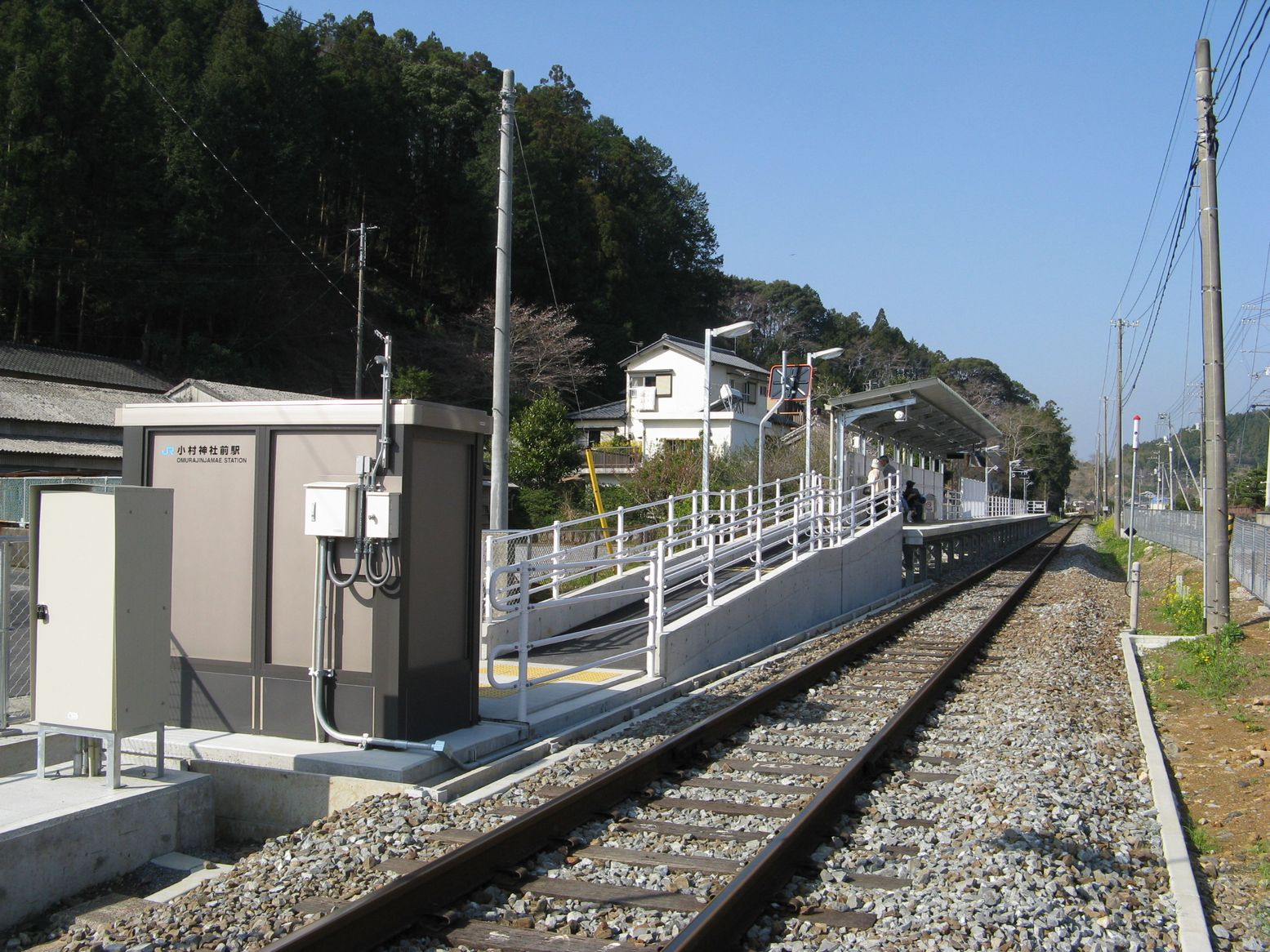
- Omurajinjamae Station, March 2008

General information
- Location: Shimobun, Hidaka, Takaoka-gun, Kōchi-ken 781-2151; Japan
- Coordinates: 33°32′23″N 133°23′34″E
- Operator: JR Shikoku
- Line: ■ Dosan Line
- Distance: 141.6 km from Tadotsu
- Platforms: 1 side platform
- Tracks: 1

Construction
- Parking: Available
- Cycle facilities: Bike shed
- Accessible: Yes - ramp leads up to platform

Other information
- Status: Unstaffed
- Station code: K08-1

History
- Opened: 15 March 2008

Passengers
- FY2019: 134
Location
- Location within Kochi Prefecture Location within Japan

Omurajinjamae Station (小村神社前駅, Omura-Jinja-Mae-eki) is a passenger railway station located in the village of Hidaka, Takaoka District, Kōchi Prefecture, Japan. It is named after nearby Omura Shrine. It is operated by JR Shikoku and has the station number "K08-1". Tha station is also called "Tosa-Ninomiya".

== Lines ==
The station is served by JR Shikoku's Dosan Line and is located 141.6 km from the beginning of the line at Tadotsu.

== Layout ==
The station consists of a side platform serving a single track. There is no station building, only a weather shelter on the platform for waiting passengers. A ramp from the access road leads up to the platform. A bike shed and parking lots are provided at the base of the ramp.

== Adjacent stations ==
«	Service	»
Dosan Line
Hakawa	Local	Kusaka

== History ==
The station was opened by JR Shikoku on 15 March 2008 as a new station on the existing Dosan Line. As JR Shikoku had introduced station numbering in 2006 and numbers "K08" and "K09" had already been assigned to Hakawa and Kusaka respectively, the new station, which was between the two, was given the number "K08-1".

== Surrounding area ==
- Omura Shrine - a Shinto shrine which holds an ancient gilt bronze sword (or tachi) which is designated as a National Treasure and two wooden masks from the Heian period designated as Important Cultural Properties of Japan.
- National Route 33 - runs parallel to the track.

== See also ==
- List of railway stations in Japan
