= Ikadazu Dam =

Coordinates: 33°33′45″N 133°12′45″E

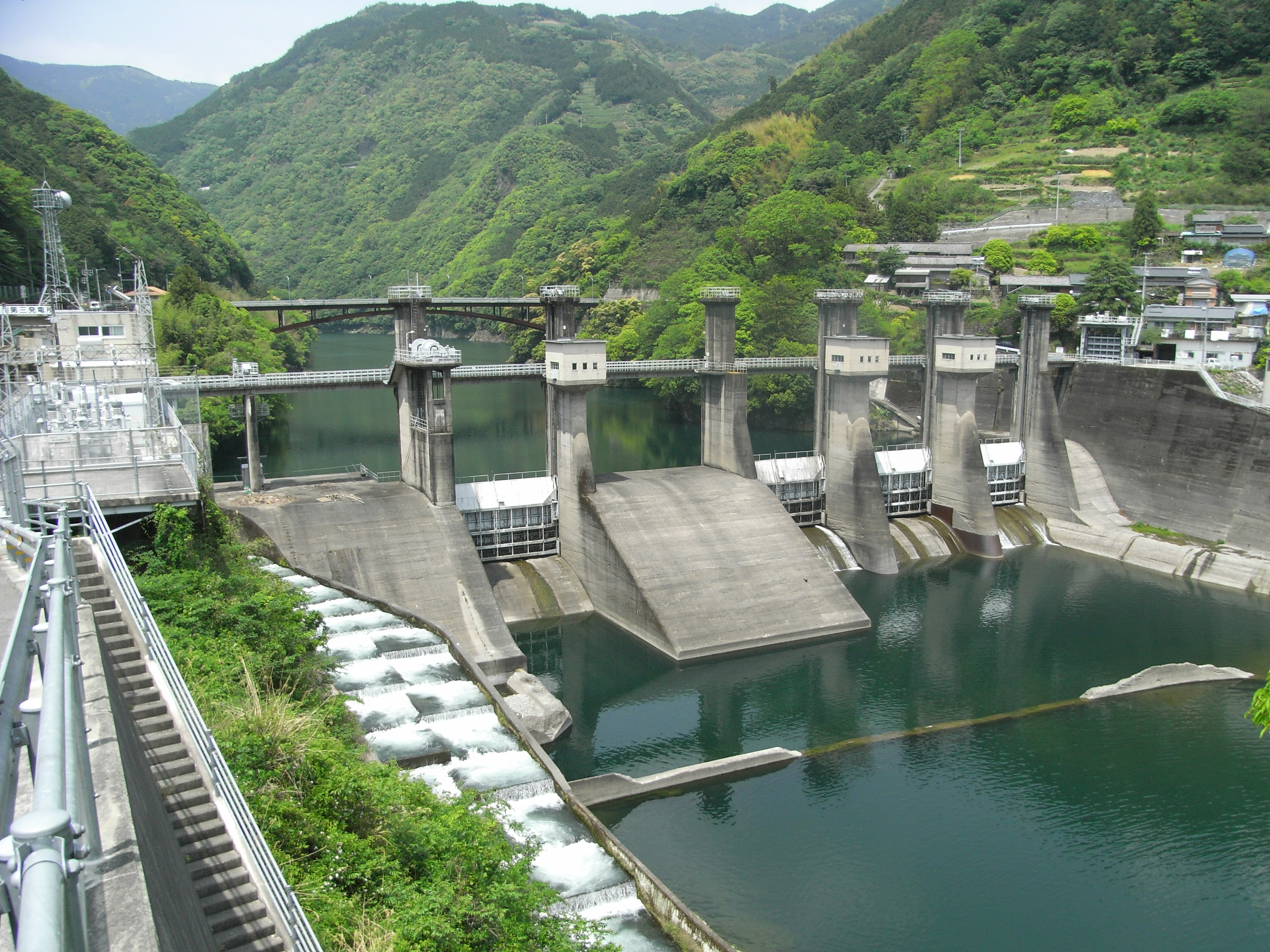
- Location: Takaoka, Kōchi, Japan
- Opening date: 1958

Dam and spillways
- Type of dam: Gravity
- Impounds: Niyodo River
- Height: 25.5 m (84 ft)
- Length: 141.7 m (465 ft)
- Dam volume: 35,000 m^{3}

Reservoir
- Total capacity: 1,837,000 m^{3}
- Catchment area: 961.1 km^{2}
- Surface area: 37 ha

Ikadazu Dam (筏津ダム, Ikadazu damu) is a dam in Takaoka, Kōchi Prefecture, Japan, completed in 1958.
