= Gohoku, Kōchi =

Dissolved municipality in Kōchi prefecture, Japan

Gohoku (吾北村, Gohoku-son) was a village located in Agawa District, Kōchi Prefecture, Japan.

As of 2003, the village had an estimated population of 3,163 and a density of 19.59 persons per km^{2}. The total area was 161.43 km^{2}.

On October 1, 2004, Gohoku, along with the village of Hongawa (from Tosa District), was merged into the expanded town of Ino, and no longer exists as an independent municipality.
