= Agawa, Kōchi =

Dissolved municipality in Kōchi prefecture, Japan

Agawa (吾川村, Agawa-mura) was a village located in Agawa District, Kōchi Prefecture, Japan.

As of 2003, the village had an estimated population of 2,927 and a density of 34.80 persons per km^{2}. The total area was 84.12 km^{2}.

On August 1, 2005, Agawa, along with the town of Ikegawa (also from Agawa District), and the village of Niyodo (from Takaoka District), was merged to create the town of Niyodogawa (in Agawa District), and no longer exists as an independent municipality.
