= Kusaka Station =

Railway station in Hidaka, Kōchi Prefecture, Japan

Kusaka Station 日下駅
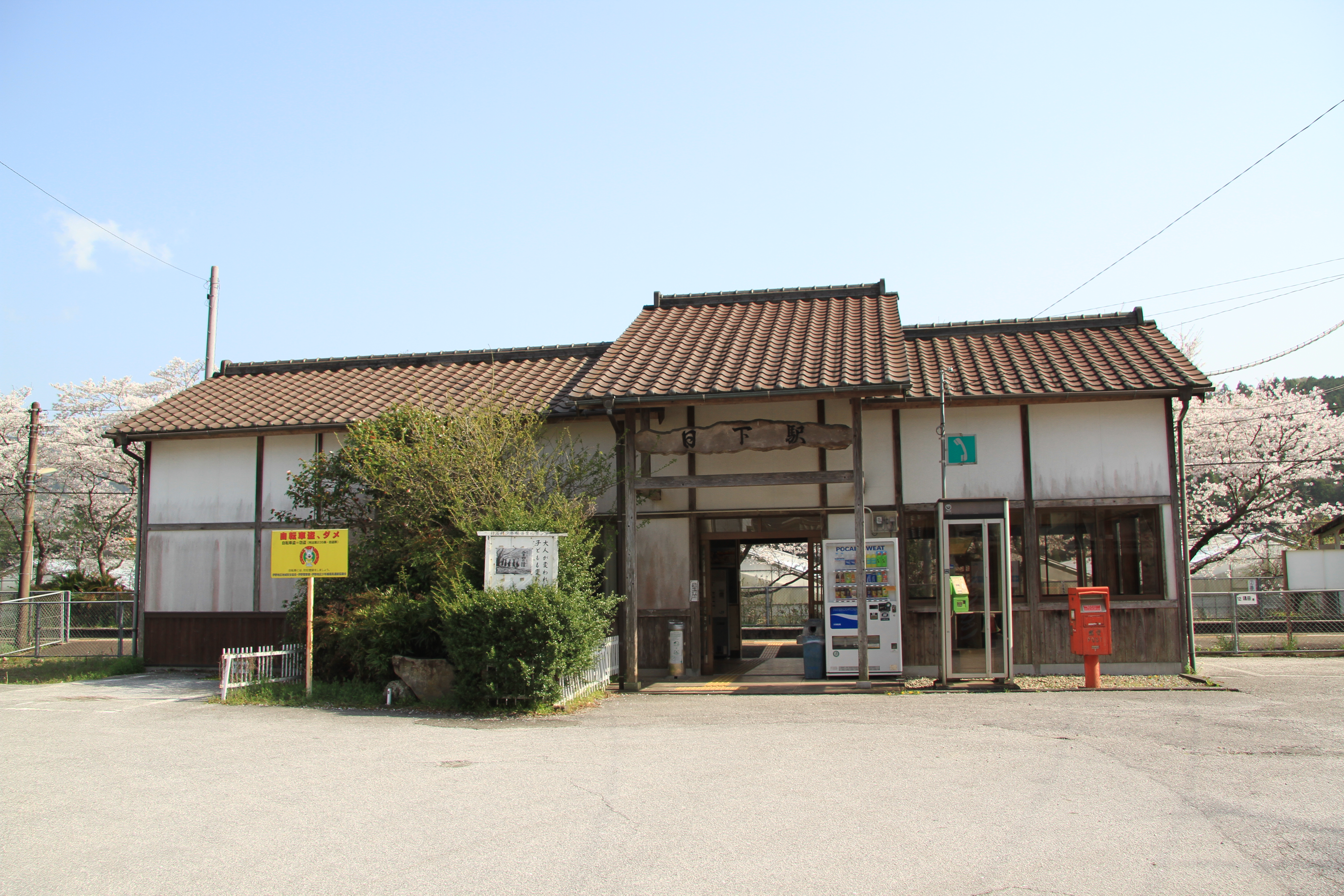
- Kusaka Station in 2011

General information
- Location: Hongo, Hidaka, Takaoka-gun, Kōchi-ken 781-2153; Japan
- Coordinates: 33°32′01″N 133°22′17″E
- Operator: JR Shikoku
- Line: ■ Dosan Line
- Distance: 143.7 km from Tadotsu
- Platforms: 2 side platforms
- Tracks: 2 + 1 siding

Construction
- Cycle facilities: Bike shed
- Accessible: Yes - platforms are connected by ramps and a level crossing

Other information
- Status: Unstaffed
- Station code: K09

History
- Opened: 30 March 1924

Passengers
- FY2019: 296
Location
- Location within Kochi Prefecture Location within Japan

Kusaka Station (日下駅, Kusaka-eki) is a passenger railway station located in the village of Hidaka, Takaoka District, Kōchi Prefecture, Japan. It is operated by JR Shikoku and has the station number "K09".

== Lines ==
The station is served by JR Shikoku's Dosan Line and is located 143.7 km from the beginning of the line at Tadotsu.

== Layout ==
The station consists of two opposed side platforms serving two tracks. A station building, which is unstaffed, is linked to platform 1 and serves as a waiting room. Ramps and a level crossing connect to platform 2 across the tracks. A bike shed is provided outside the station. A short siding juts partially into the other side of platform 1.

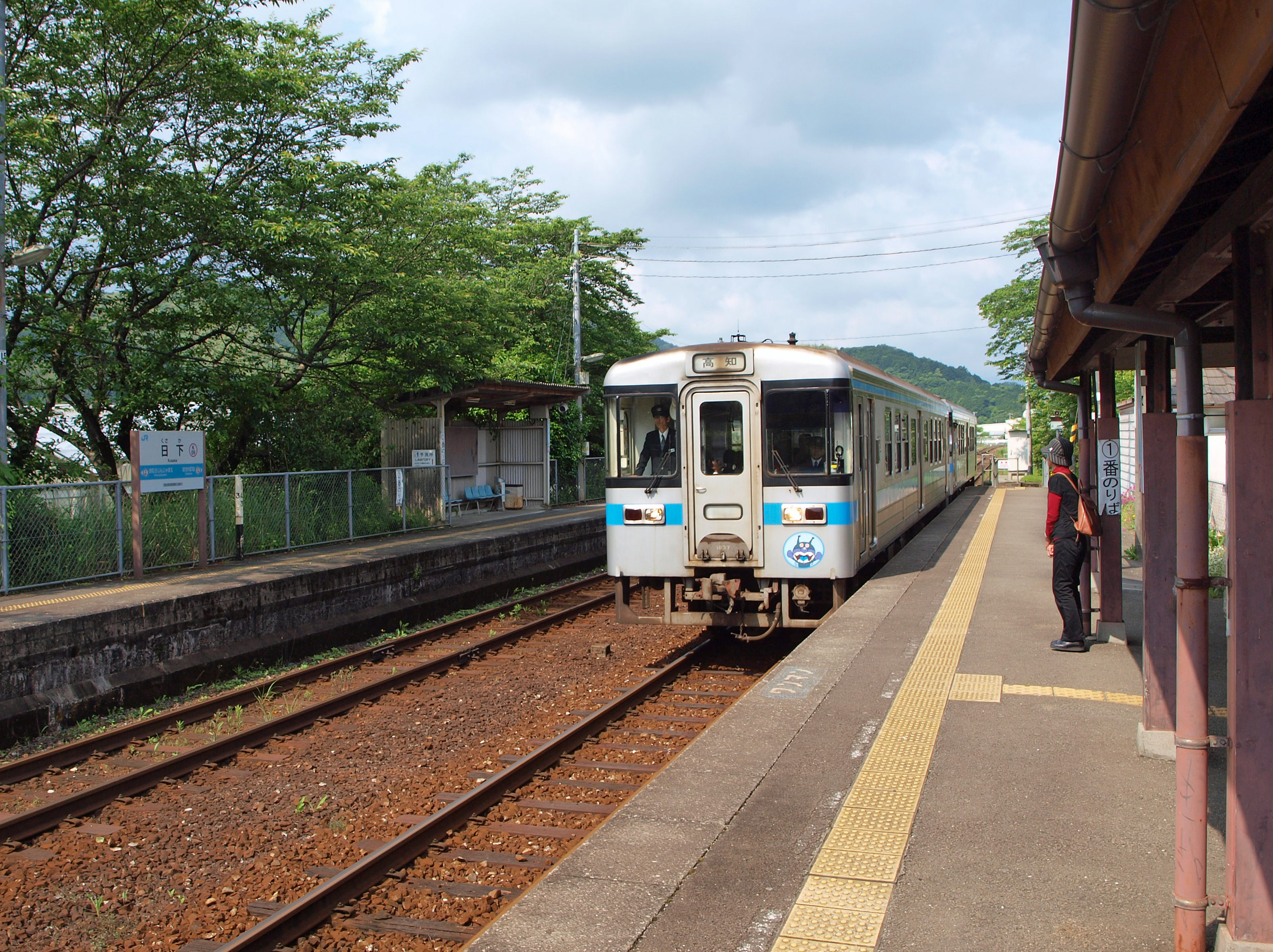
View of the station platforms in 2010 looking in the direction of Kubokawa

== Adjacent stations ==
«	Service	»
Dosan Line
Omurajinjamae	Local	Okabana

== History ==
The station opened on 30 March 1924 as the terminus of the then Kōchi Line (later renamed the Dosan Line) was constructed eastwards from Susaki. On 15 November 1924 it became a through-station when the line was extended to Kōchi. At this time the station was operated by Japanese Government Railways, later becoming Japanese National Railways (JNR). With the privatization of JNR on 1 April 1987, control of the station passed to JR Shikoku.

== Surrounding area ==
- Hidaka Village Hall
- Hidaka Village Kusaka Elementary School

== See also ==
- List of railway stations in Japan
