= Kenpi =

Japanese Potato chips

Imo-kenpi
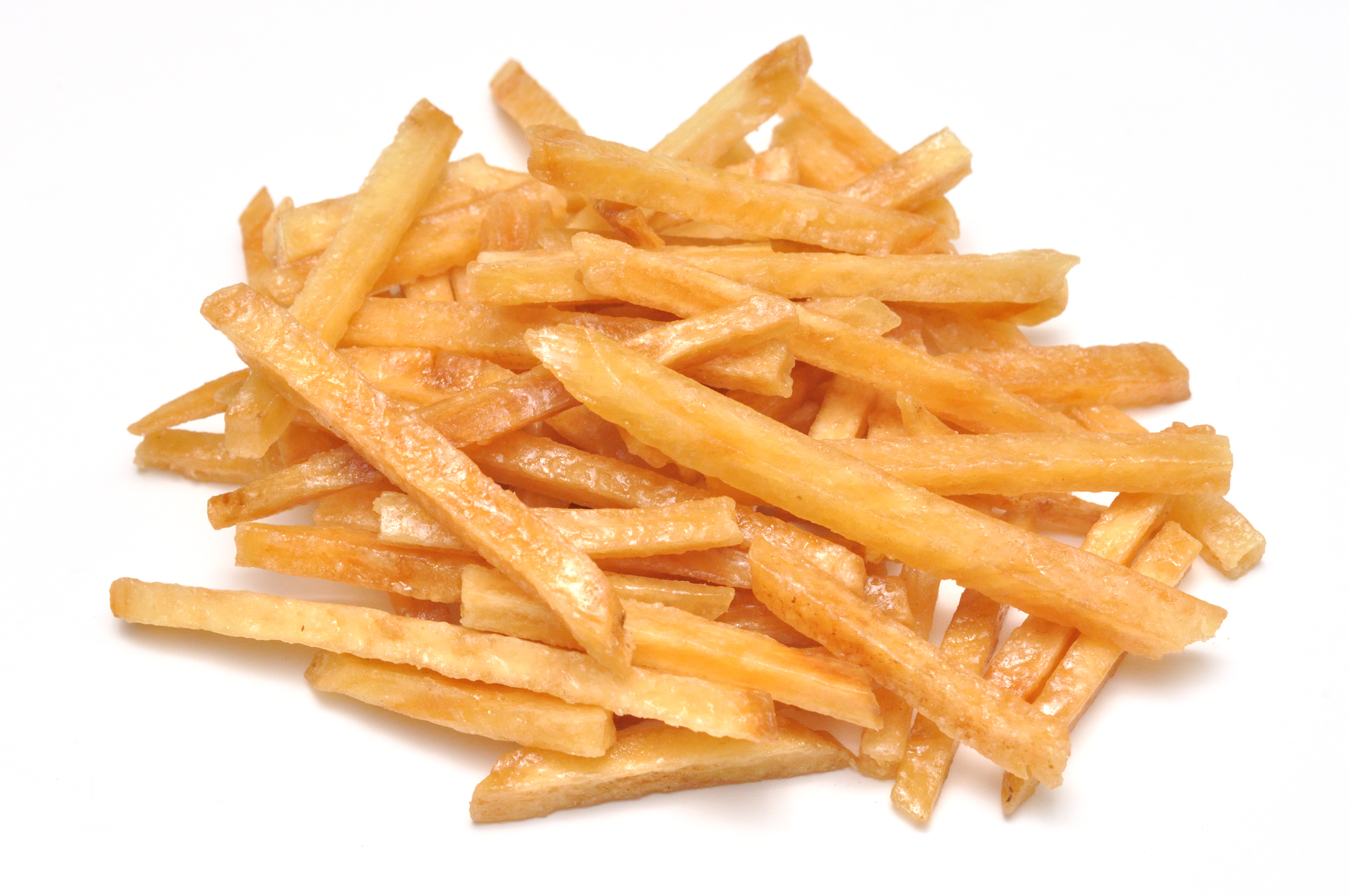
- Type: Snack
- Place of origin: Japan
- Region or state: Kōchi Prefecture
- Main ingredients: Sweet potato

Imo-kenpi (芋けんぴ, 芋 meaning "potato" (especially "sweet potato")) is a snack food and common omiyage/meibutsu from Kōchi Prefecture, Japan.

They are strips of candied sweet potato, resembling french fries in appearance, but are hard and sugary sweet in taste. Now, in Japan, almost all super markets and convenience stores sell imo-kenpi of their own brands. You can get imo-kenpi everywhere. One Japanese manga describes imo-kenpi as an aphrodisiac. A phrase, "You have imo-kenpi in your hair." became famous in SNS.

Imo-kenpi is made from 5 cm strips of raw sweet potato (the purple skinned variety, peeled) that is fried in 160 degrees Celsius oil until golden brown and most of the moisture has been extracted from the sweet potato (i.e. the foaming of the oil has stopped), leaving the cooled product crisp. The strips are drained of excess oil. A sugar glaze is made of granular sugar, a trace of salt for flavor, and water that is heated to just short of the hard boil stage over medium-low heat and then poured over the fried sweet potatoes. The strips are then separated, placed on a rack, and allowed to drain of any excess sugar until cool. The sugar sauce typically sugars as it glazes due to having been disturbed while hot or due to introduction of sugar crystals while cooling. Because of the high sugar content, once cooled, the imo-kenpi must be immediately stored in sealed bags or containers to maintain crispness.

Variations include different varieties of sweet potatoes, inclusion of the skin, different amounts of salt in the sugar mixture, different additional flavorings (e.g. ginger), and different sugar sauce preparation methodologies (i.e. fudge, sugared glaze, clear glaze, and caramelization). Because any sugar sauce can be caramelized, any variety of already established caramel flavoring methods can also be used (e.g. cream, coffee, chocolate, liquors) provided that a hard glaze is still attained. Thus in theory, a peel on, gingered, caramelled, brandy flavored imo-kenpi should be attainable.

100g of Imo Kenpi has 90 Calories; typical American "French Fries" have 141 Calories.
