= Omura Shrine =

Shinto shrine in Kōchi Prefecture, Japan

Omura Shrine 小村神社
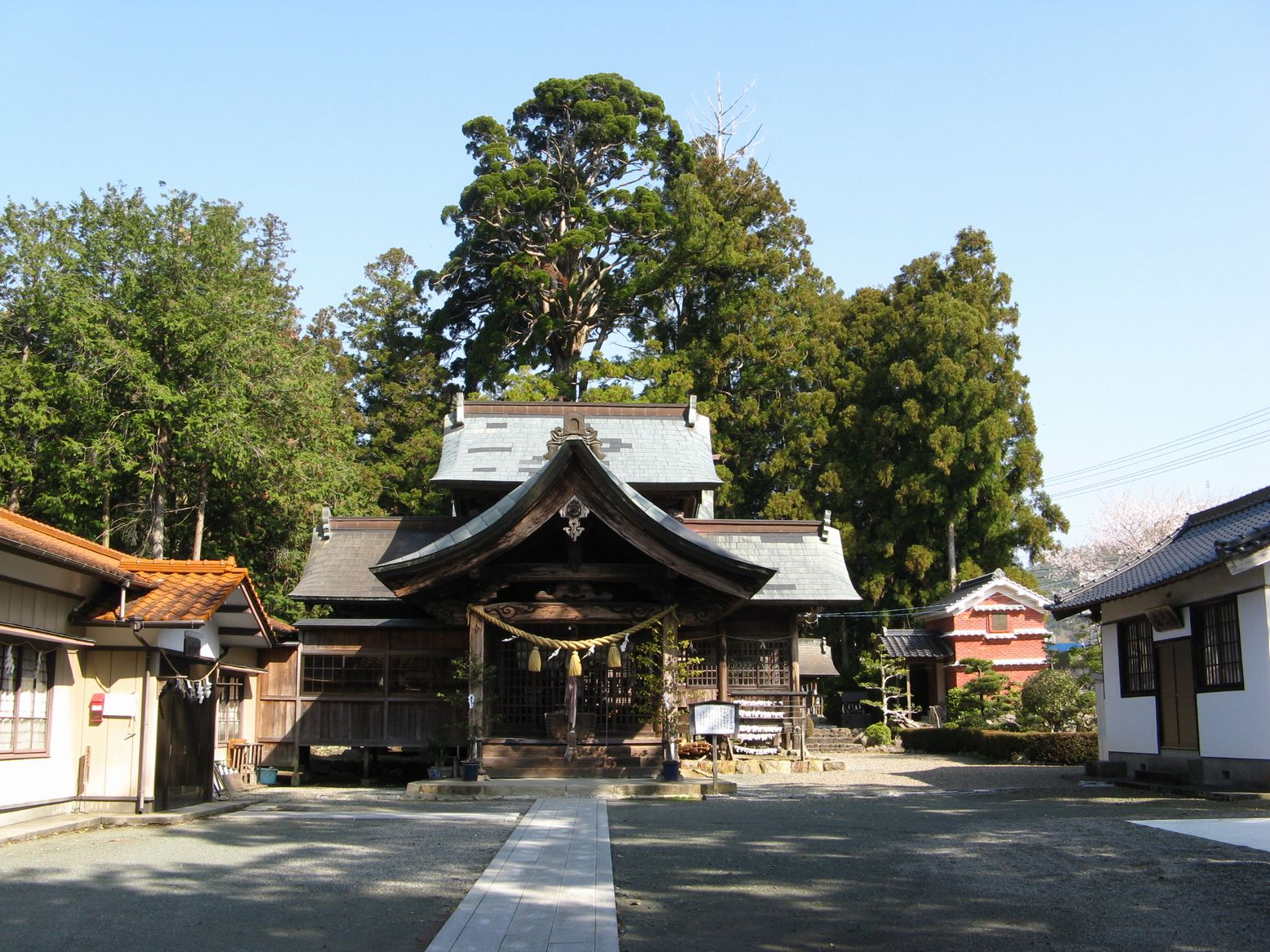
- Haiden and sacred tree "Tōmyō-sugi" behind it

- Location within Japan

Religion
- Affiliation: Shinto
- Deity: Kunitokotachi

Location
- Interactive map of Omura Shrine 小村神社
- Coordinates: 33°32′35.8″N 133°23′34.8″E

Architecture
- Established: 587

Omura Shrine (小村神社, Omura-jinja; often misspelled as "Komura Shrine") is a Shinto shrine in Hidaka, Takaoka District, Kōchi Prefecture, Japan.

The shrine was founded in 587, but the present main building (shaden) of the shrine dates to 1705. The Botansugi (牡丹杉) Japanese cedar behind the main building is considered sacred and said to be 1000 years old. It has been designated by the village as natural monument (村指定天然記念物). According to legend, the tree top is said to shine at times of emergency. Because of this, the tree is also called Eternal flame (or votive light) cedar (燈明杉, Tōmyō-sugi).

The object of worship or shintai of the shrine is a sword, the National Treasure gilt bronze tachi with ring pommel (金銅荘環頭大刀拵, kondōsō kantō tachi goshirae). Offered to Kunitokotachi by the Kusakabe clan at the time of foundation, this double-edged blade is said to be the oldest Japanese object transmitted from generation to generation. This straight sword dates to the late Kofun period, weighs 527 g (18.6 oz), has a length (distance from the notch to the tip of the sword) of 68.4 cm (26.9 in), a hilt length of 7.5 cm (3.0 in) and a scabbard length of 92.1 cm (36.3 in). The tachi is on public display at the shrine's yearly grand festival on November 15.

Two late Heian period wooden masks of Boddhisattvas designated as Important Cultural Properties and two mirrors featuring a Hōrai design designated as prefectural tangible cultural properties are in possession of the shrine. Other notable treasures held by the shrine include a piece of Sue ware, two bronze hoko, a vertical picture attributed to Ono no Michikaze, a munafuda (棟札) ridge tag with information on the building's construction from 1240, nine painted wooden hengaku votive plaques of the 36 poets and a tanzaku (narrow strip of paper) with waka by Emperor Go-Nara.

Omura-Jinja-Mae Station on the Dosan Line was opened in 2008 and is named after Omura Shrine. It is located about 300 m (980 ft) south of the shrine.

== See also ==
- List of National Treasures of Japan (crafts: swords)
