= Ochi, Kōchi =

Ochi 越知町
- Town
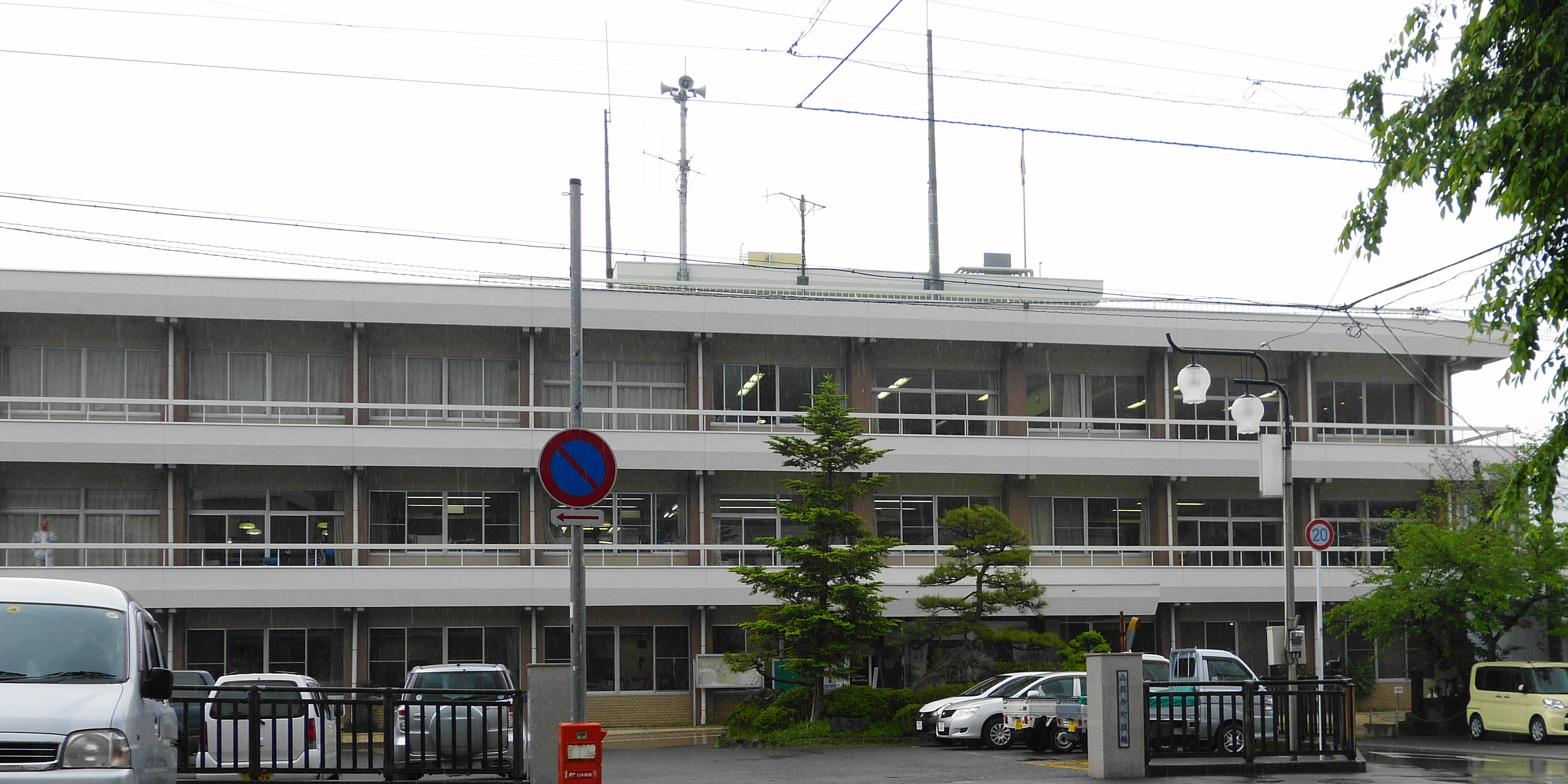
- Ochi town hall

- Flag Seal
- Location of Ochi in Kōchi Prefecture

- Location in Japan
- Coordinates: 33°32′N 133°15′E
- Country: Japan
- Region: Shikoku
- Prefecture: Kōchi
- District: Takaoka

Area
  - Total: 111.95 km^{2} (43.22 sq mi)

Population (July 31, 2022)
  - Total: 5,157
  - Density: 46.07/km^{2} (119.3/sq mi)
- Time zone: UTC+09:00 (JST)
- City hall address: 1970 Kou Ochi, Ochi-chō, Takaoka-gun, Kōchi-ken 781-1301
- Website: Official website
- Symbols
- Flower: Cosmos

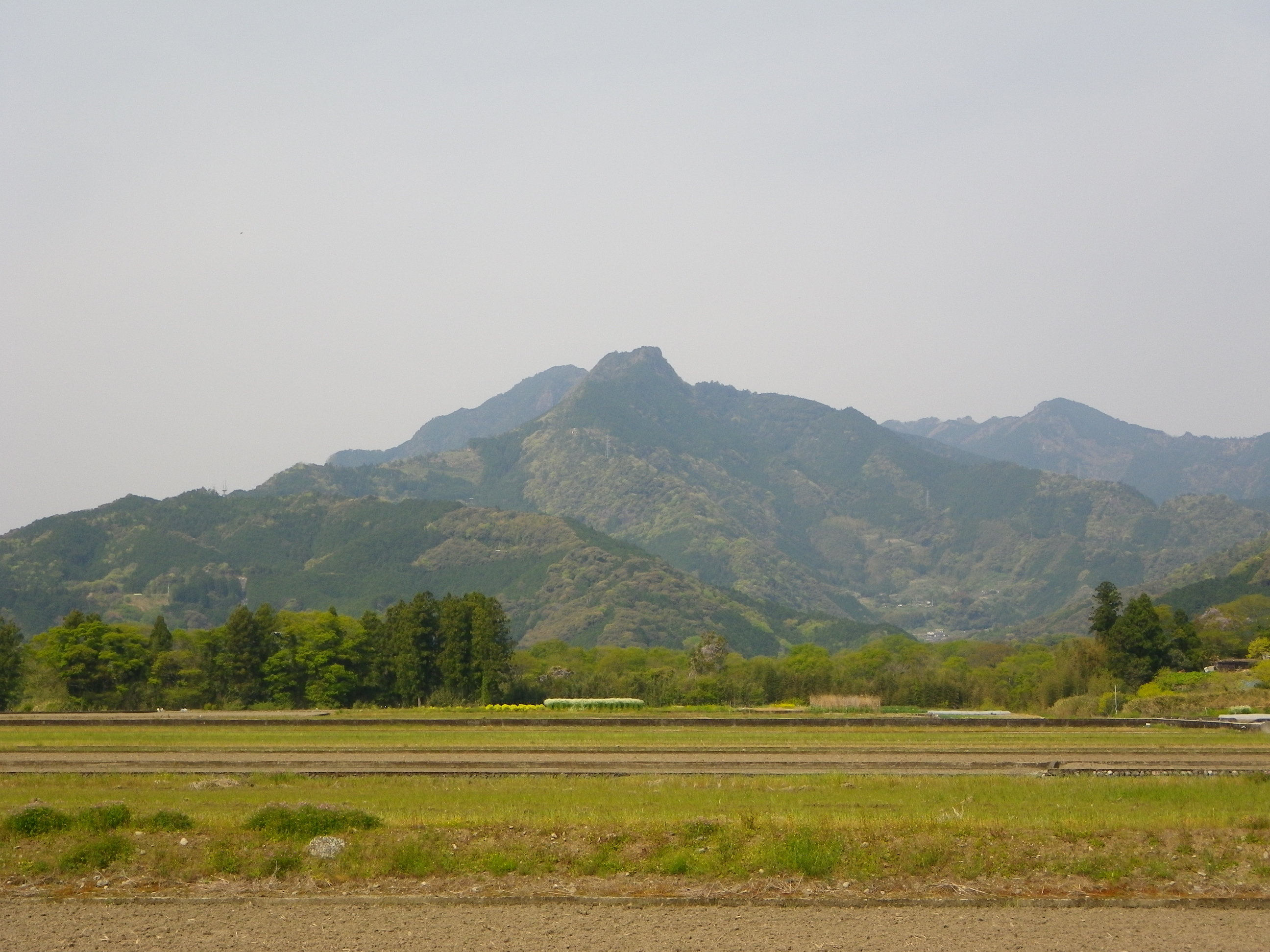
Mt. Yokokurayama

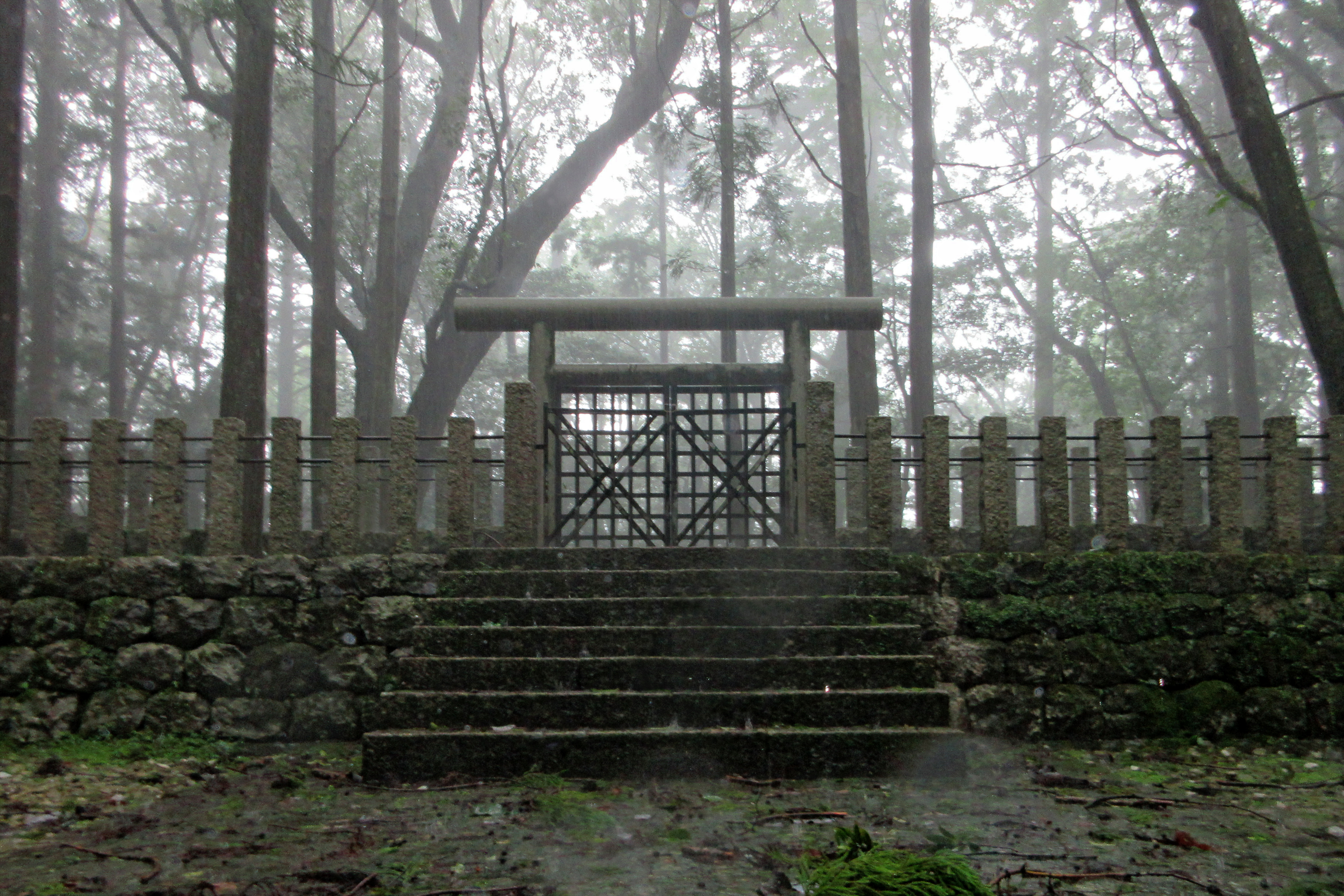
Emperor Antoku's Mausoleum Reference Site

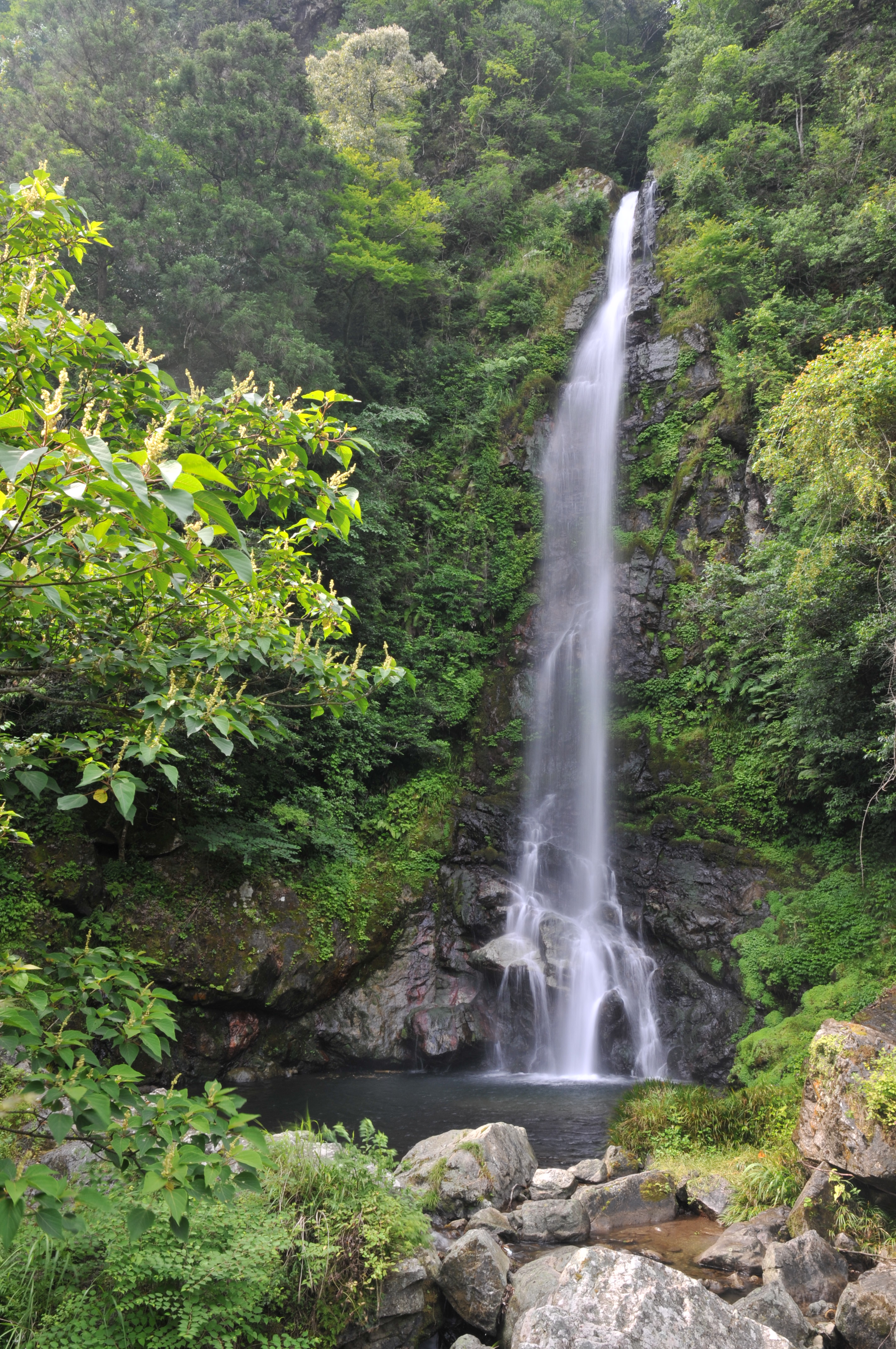
Otaru Falls

Ochi (越知町, Ochi-chō) is a town located in Takaoka District, Kōchi Prefecture, Japan. As of 1 January 2022, the town had an estimated population of 5,157 in 2,673 households and a population density of 46 persons per km^{2}. The total area of the town is 111.95 square kilometres (43.22 sq mi).

== Geography ==
Ochi is located in midwestern Kōchi Prefecture on the island of Shikoku. In the western part of the town lies the Yokokurayama Prefectural Natural Park. The center of the town is located at the confluence of three rivers, the Niyodo River, the Sakaori River, and the Yanase River, and is lined with houses and shops. The Ikazu Dam is located in Ochi.

=== Neighbouring municipalities ===
Kōchi Prefecture

- Hidaka
- Ino
- Niyodogawa
- Sakawa
- Tsuno

=== Climate ===
Ochi has a humid subtropical climate (Köppen Cfa) characterized by warm summers and cool winters with light snowfall. The average annual temperature in Ochi is 15.3 °C. The average annual rainfall is 2688 mm with September as the wettest month. The temperatures are highest on average in January, at around 25.6 °C, and lowest in January, at around 5.0 °C.

== Demographics ==
Per Japanese census data, the population of Ochi has been decreasing steadily since the 1960s.

Historical population
Year	Pop.	±%
1920	4,848	—
1930	5,170	+6.6%
1940	4,975	−3.8%
1950	7,293	+46.6%
1960	11,884	+63.0%
1970	9,611	−19.1%
1980	9,052	−5.8%
1990	8,234	−9.0%
2000	7,411	−10.0%
2010	6,374	−14.0%
2020	5,187	−18.6%

== History ==
As with all of Kōchi Prefecture, the area of Ochi was part of ancient Tosa Province. There is a local legend that Emperor Antoku escaped the disaster at the Battle of Dannoura during the Genpei War and lived the rest of his life in obscurity in this area. During the Edo period, the area was part of the holdings of Tosa Domain, ruled by the Yamauchi clan from their seat at Kōchi Castle. The village of Ochi was established with the creation of the modern municipalities system on October 1, 1889. It was raised to town status on June 7, 1900.

== Government ==
Ochi has a mayor-council form of government with a directly elected mayor and a unicameral town council of ten members. Ochi, together with the municipalities of Sakawa and Hidaka, contributes one member to the Kōchi Prefectural Assembly. In terms of national politics, the town is part of Kōchi 2nd district of the lower house of the Diet of Japan.

== Economy ==
The economy of Ochi is almost entirely agricultural.

== Education ==
Ochi has one public elementary school and one public middle school operated by the village government. The town does not have a high school.

== Transportation ==
=== Railway ===
The town does not have any passenger railroad service. The nearest train station is Sakawa Station on the JR Shikoku Dosan Line in the neighboring town of Sakawa.

=== Highways ===
- National Route 33
- National Route 494

== Noted people from Ochi ==
- Futago Kamikita, manga artist
- Yūji Yamamoto, politician
