= Shikoku Mannaka Sennen Monogatari =

Japanese limited express train service

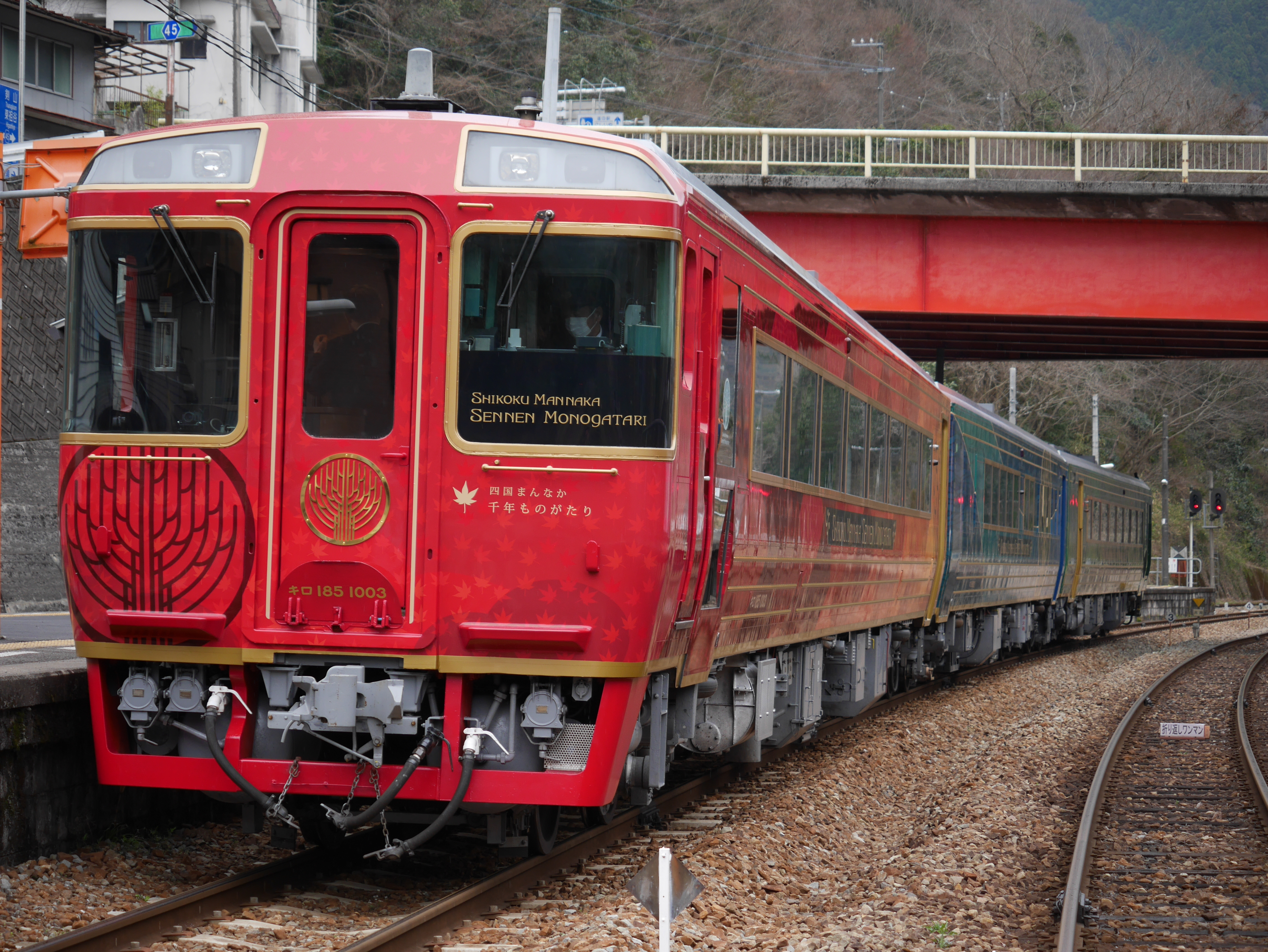
- Third compartment of the Shikoku Mannaka Sennen Monogatari

Overview
- Service type: Limited express
- Status: Operational
- Locale: Shikoku, Japan
- First service: 1 April 2017
- Current operator: JR Shikoku

Route
- Termini: Tadotsu; Ōboke
- Stops: 4
- Line used: Dosan Line

Technical
- Rolling stock: KiHa 185 series DMU
- Track gauge: 1,067 mm (3 ft 6 in)
- Electrification: 1,500 V DC overhead (Tadotsu to Kotohira), Diesel (Kotohira to Ōboke)

The Shikoku Mannaka Sennen Monogatari (四国まんなか千年ものがたり, Shikoku mannaka sennen monogatari) is a limited express sightseeing train service operated by JR Shikoku in Shikoku, Japan, since April 2017.

== Overview ==
The Shikoku Mannaka Sennen Monogatari is the second sightseeing train in Shikoku, launching three years after the Iyonada Monogatari. It started operations on April 1, 2017.

The train runs through the center of Shikoku, showing passengers views of the countryside and mountains of Tokushima and Kagawa Prefectures. Its route passes near attractions such as Ōboke Gorge, Zentsū-ji, and Konpira Shrine. The concept of the train service comes from yuzan (mountain-touring), an old local custom in which children brought lunch up the mountain to play during Double Third Festival (Hinamatsuri).

== Operation status ==
The train service operates on Fridays, weekends, and holidays between Tadotsu and Ōboke. Meals created with local ingredients are available on every route, and the train operates as a limited express with reserved seating.

The morning service out of Tadotsu is named Travel to the Land of the Sky (そらの郷紀行), based on an old nickname for the remote mountain villages of Tokushima. The afternoon service out of Ōboke is named Travel to the Land of Happiness (しあわせの郷紀行), based on the slogan for Konpira Shrine (shiawase no konpira-san).

The train stops at several different stations along its route, with both service patterns stopping at Ōboke, Zentsūji, Kotohira, and Tadotsu. Additional stops include:

Morning Service (Tadotsu to Ōboke):

- Sanuki-Saida, Tsubojiri, Awa-Ikeda, Minawa

Afternoon Service (Ōboke to Tadotsu):

- Koboke, Awa-Kawaguchi, Awa-Ikeda, Tsubojiri, Sanuki-Saida, Konzōji

In early- to mid-July, the train also slows down near Shioiri for passengers to view sunflower fields in the area.

The Shikoku Mannaka Sennen Monogatari was suspended between March 6 and July 4 in 2020 due to the COVID-19 pandemic. In August 2024, the service reached 100,000 passengers in total ridership.

== Rolling stock ==
The Shikoku Mannaka Sennen Monogatari uses a 3-car KiHa 185 series DMU for its services. The first car (Spring Chapter) is painted green, the second car (Summer Chapter) white and blue, and the third car (Autumn Chapter) crimson. The cars incorporate traditional Japanese motifs such as clouds and Japanese gardens in their designs.

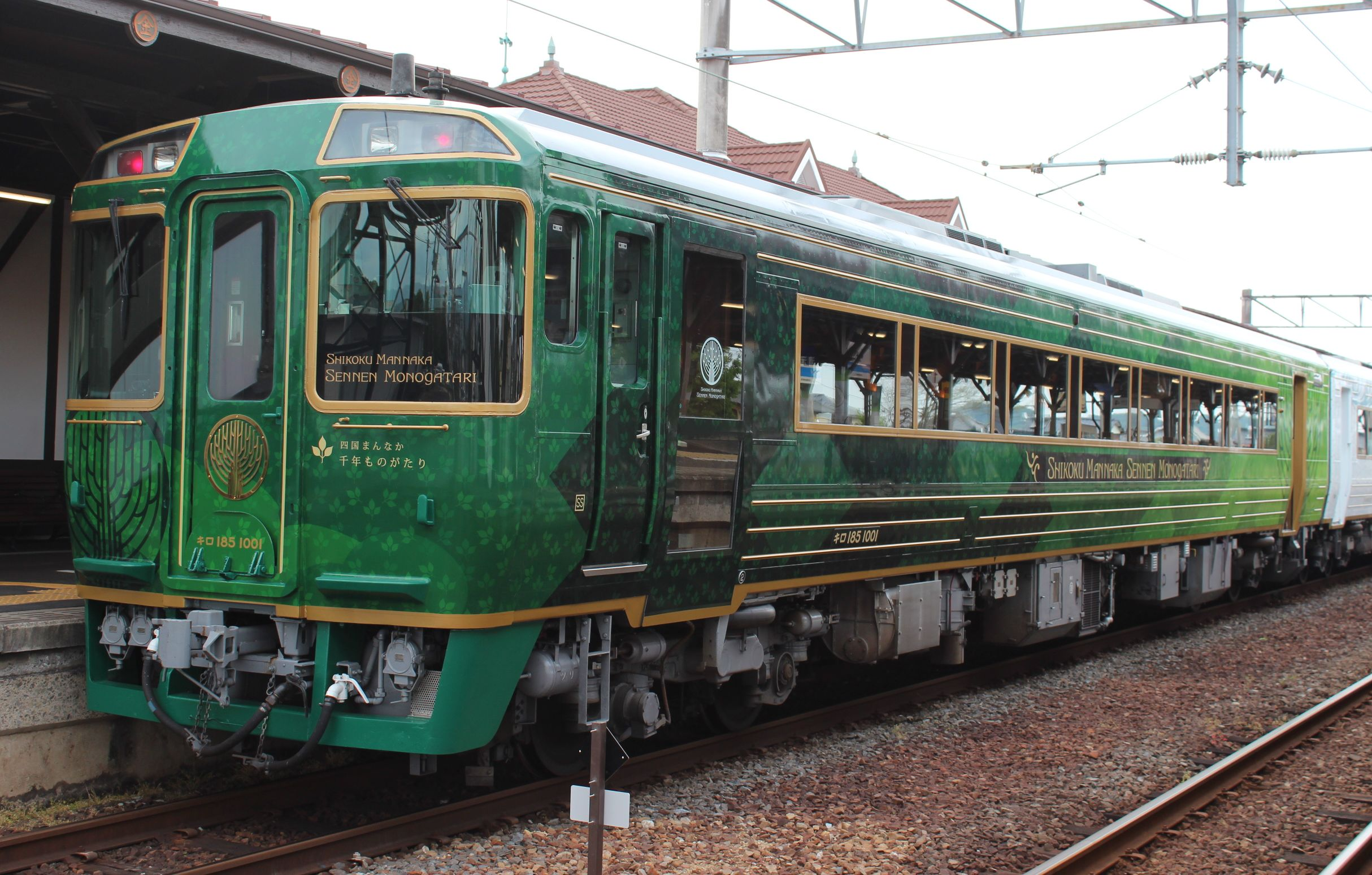
Spring Chapter (KiHa 185-14) in 2017

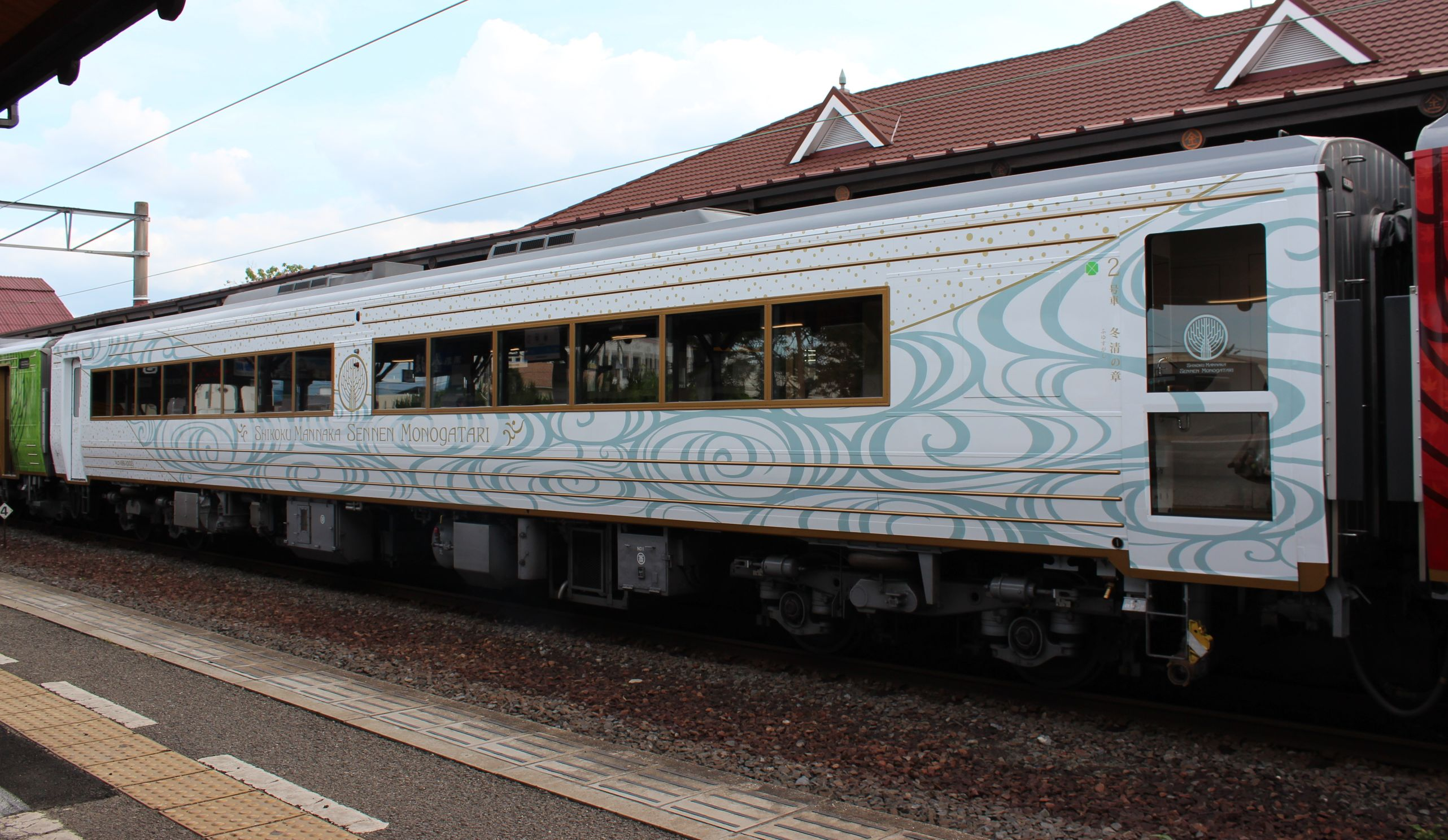
Summer Chapter (KiRo 186-4) in 2017

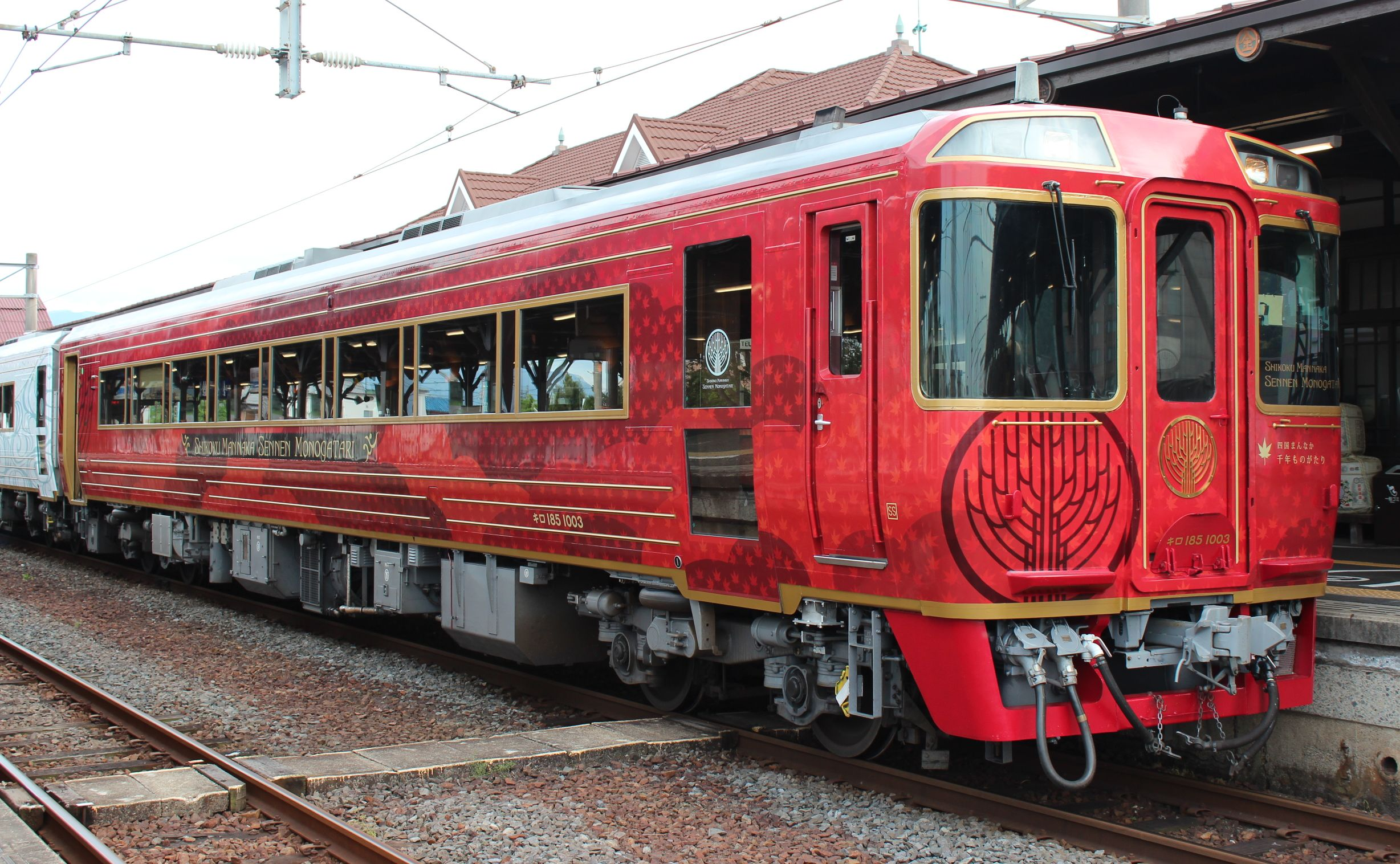
Autumn Chapter (KiHa 185-3102, originally KiHa-1002) in 2017

== Gallery ==
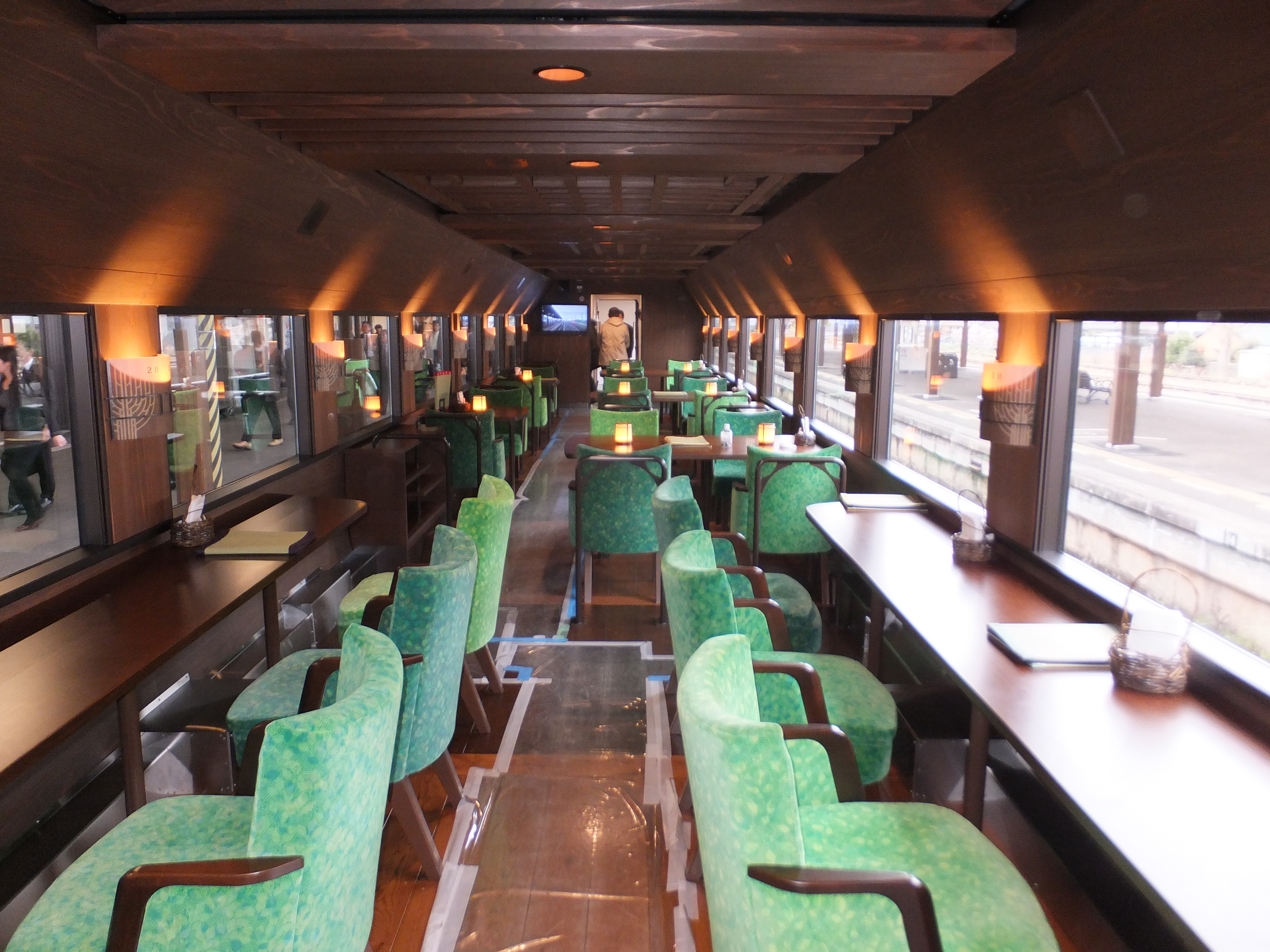
Interior of Spring Chapter in 2017

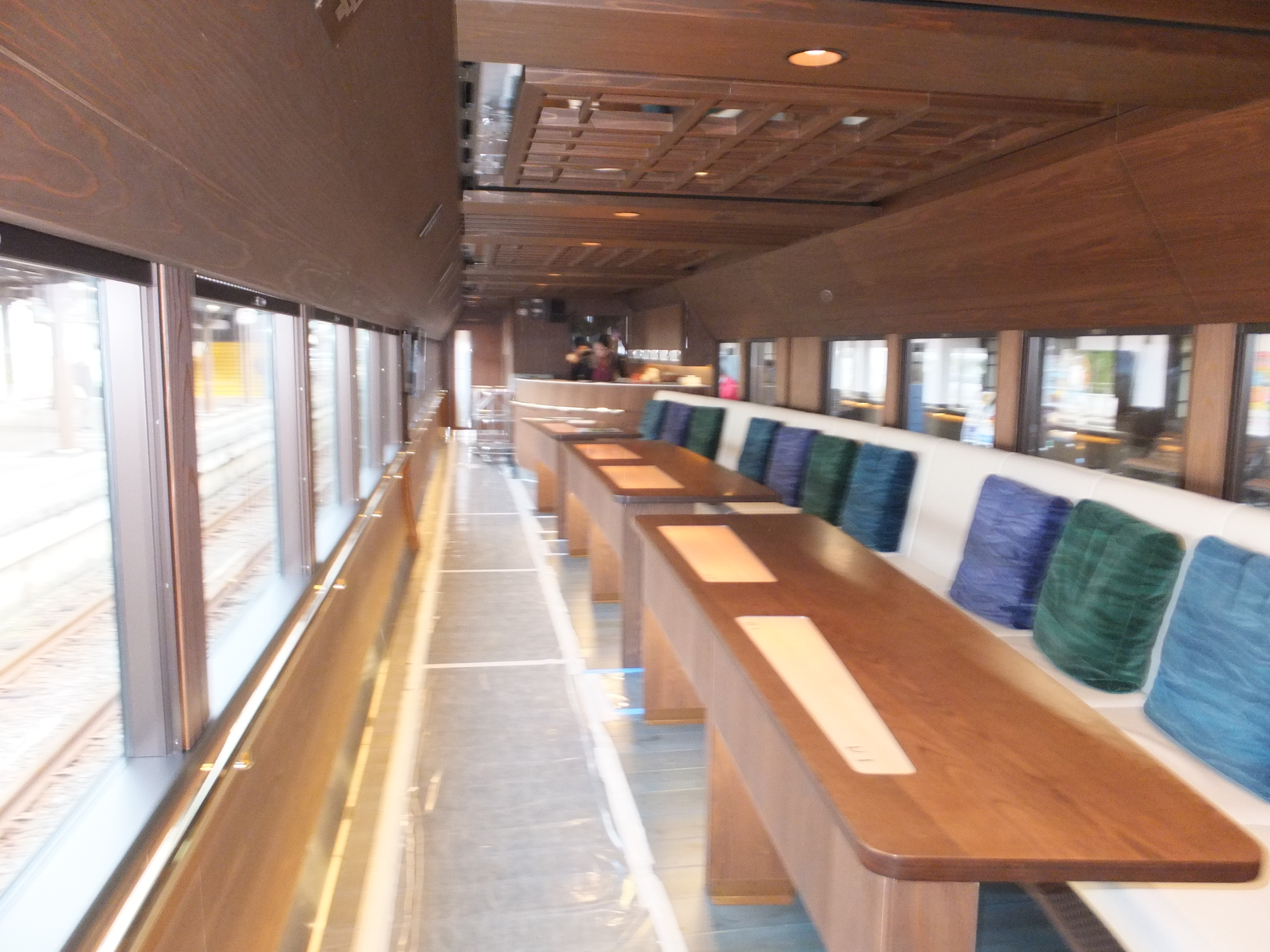
Interior of Summer Chapter in 2017

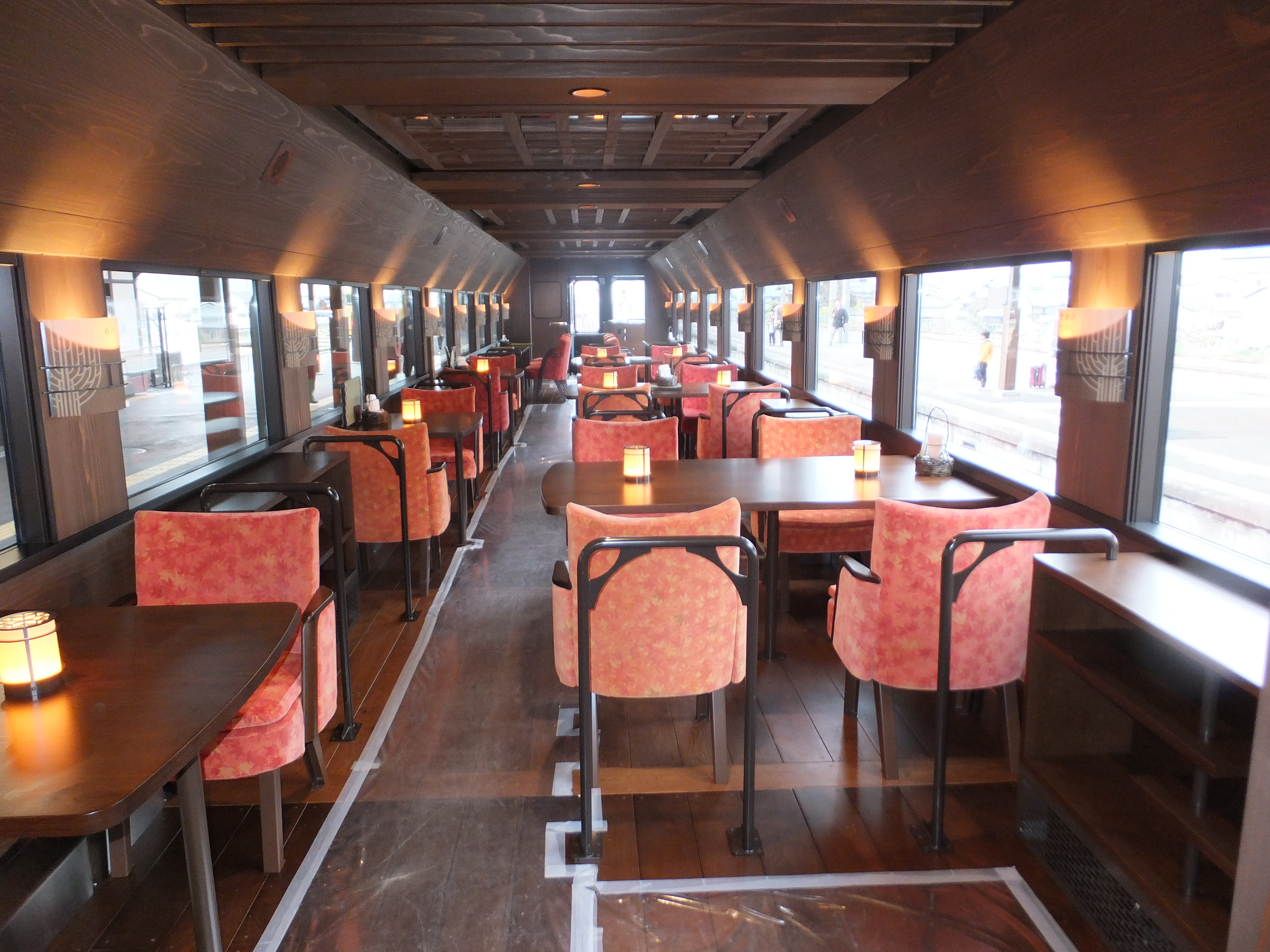
Interior of Autumn Chapter in 2017

== See also ==
- Joyful Train
