= Hashikura Station =

Railway station in Miyoshi, Tokushima Prefecture, Japan

D20 Hashikura Station 箸蔵駅
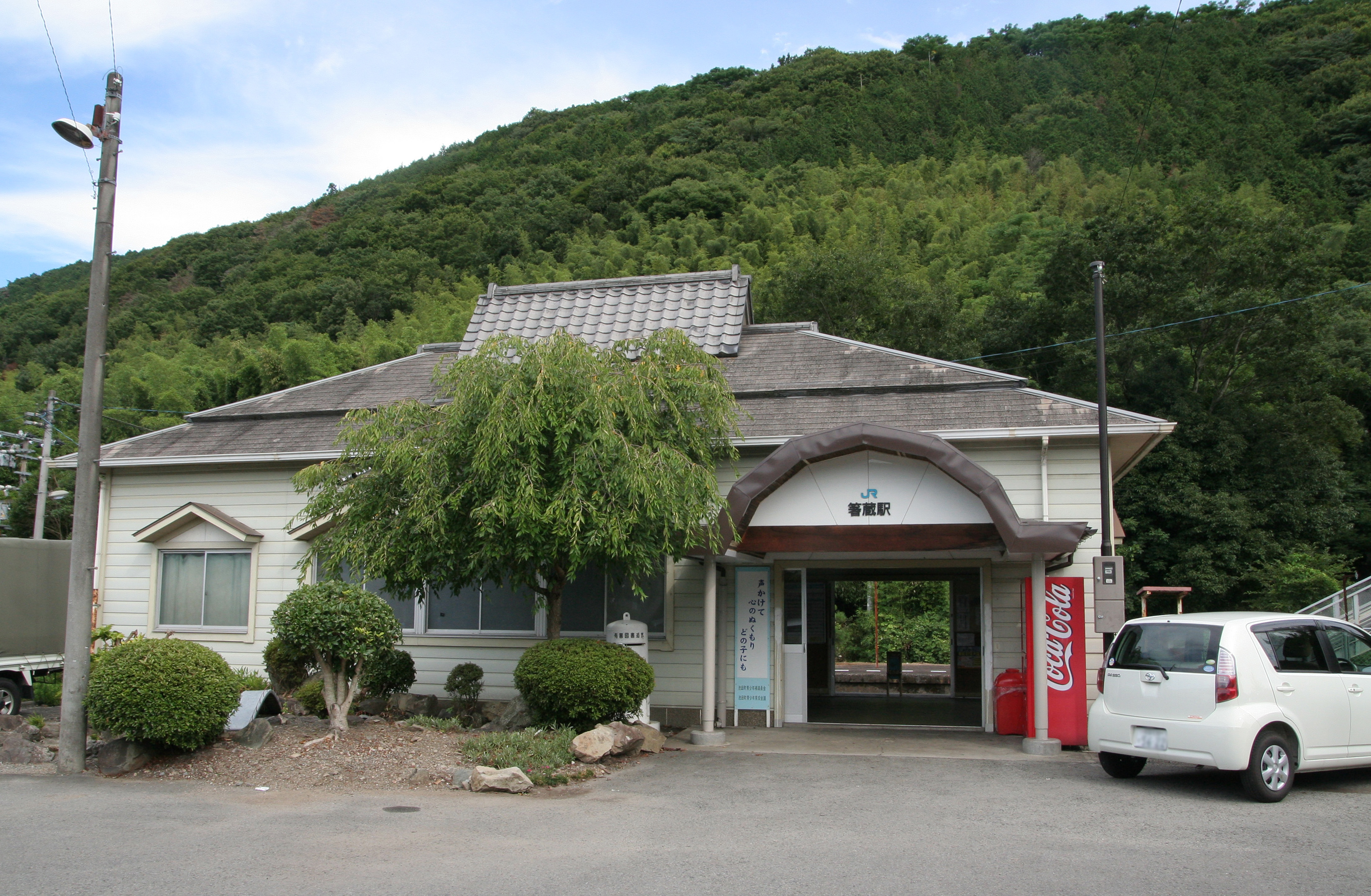
- Hashikura Station in 2008

General information
- Location: Japan
- Coordinates: 34°02′26″N 133°50′54″E
- Operator: JR Shikoku
- Line: ■ Dosan Line
- Distance: 35.4 km (22.0 mi) from Tadotsu
- Platforms: 2 side platforms
- Tracks: 2

Construction
- Accessible: No - overhead footbridge needed to access one of the platforms

Other information
- Status: Unstaffed
- Station code: D20

History
- Opened: 28 April 1929

Passengers
- FY2019: 102
Location
- Location within Tokushima Prefecture Location within Japan

Hashikura Station (箸蔵駅, Hashikura-eki) is a passenger railway station located in the city of Miyoshi, Tokushima Prefecture, Japan. It is operated by JR Shikoku and has the station number "D20".

== Lines ==
Hashikura Station is served by the JR Shikoku Dosan Line and is located 35.4 km (22.0 mi) from the beginning of the line at Tadotsu. Only local trains stop at the station.

== Layout ==
The station consists of two side platforms serving two tracks. An unstaffed station building connected to one of the side platforms serves as a waiting room. An overhead footbridge gives access to the other platform.

=== Platforms ===
1	■ Dosan Line	for Kotohira, Tadotsu and Takamatsu
2	■ Dosan Line	for Awa-Ikeda, Ōboke and Kōchi

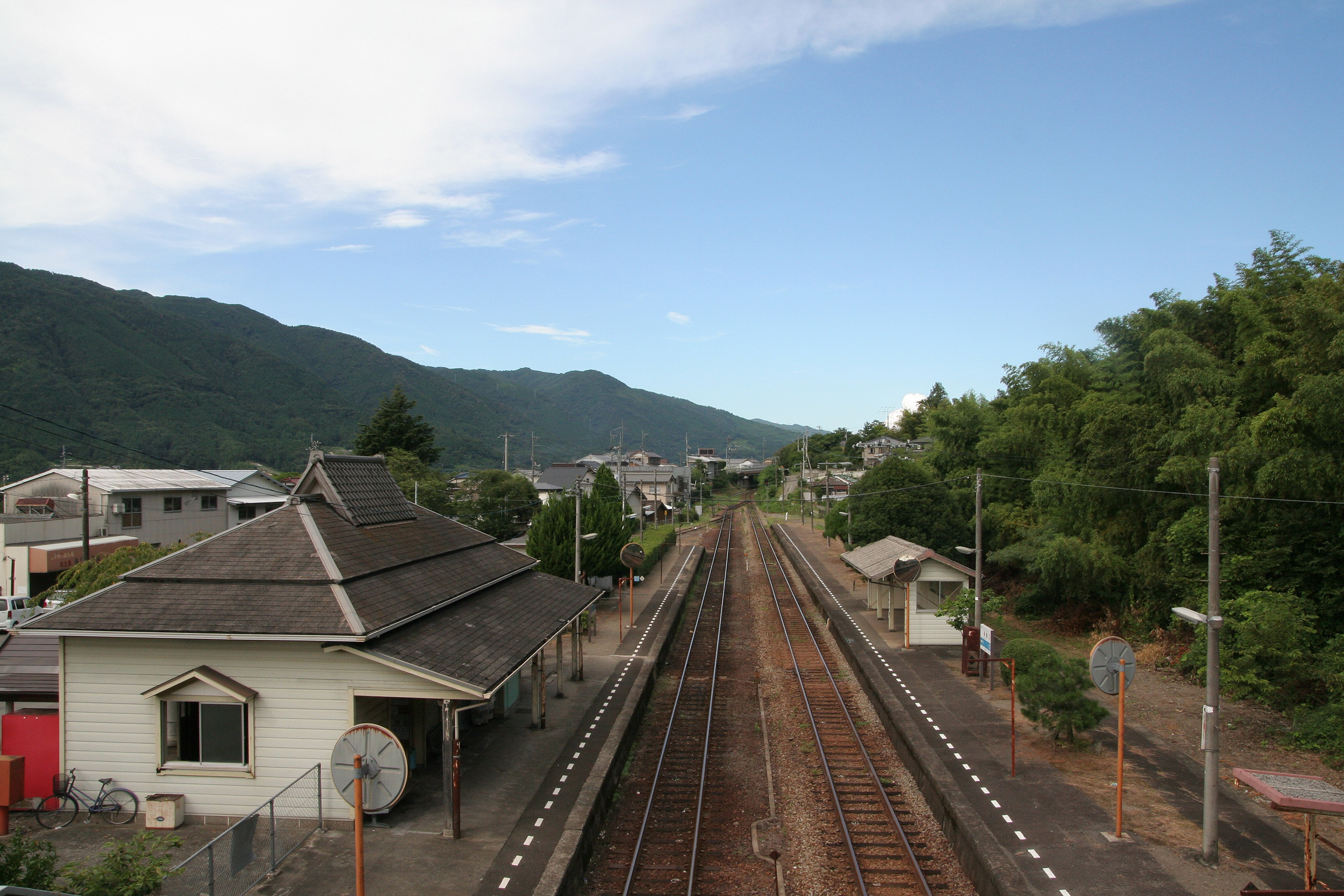
View of the station platforms in 2008 looking in the direction of Tadotsu.

== Adjacent stations ==
«	Service	»
Dosan Line
Tsubojiri	-	Tsukuda

== History ==
The station opened on 28 April 1929 when the line was extended from Sanuki-Saida southwards to Tsukuda Signal Station (now Tsukuda), thus linking up with the track of the Tokushima Line and providing service to Awa-Ikeda. At this time the line was known as the Sanyo Line and was operated by Japanese Government Railways (JGR) which was later corporatised as Japanese National Railways (JNR). With the privatization of JNR on 1 April 1987, control of the station passed to JR Shikoku.

== Surrounding area ==
- National Route 32 - runs parallel to the track.
- Hashikura-ji Temple - a Buddhist temple at the summit of Mount Hashikura and accessible by the Hashikurasan Ropeway.

== See also ==
- List of railway stations in Japan
