= Kurokawa =

Kurokawa may refer to:

== Places ==
- Kurokawa, Niigata
- Kurokawa District, Miyagi
- Kurokawa Domain

== Other uses ==
- Kurokawa (surname)
- Kurokawa (publisher), a manga publisher in France
- Siege of Kurokawa
- Kurokawa Station (disambiguation)
- 10365 Kurokawa
- Kurokawa Dam
- Ogisai Kurokawa Noh
