= Takamatsu Airport =

Airport in Takamatsu, Kagawa Prefecture, Japan

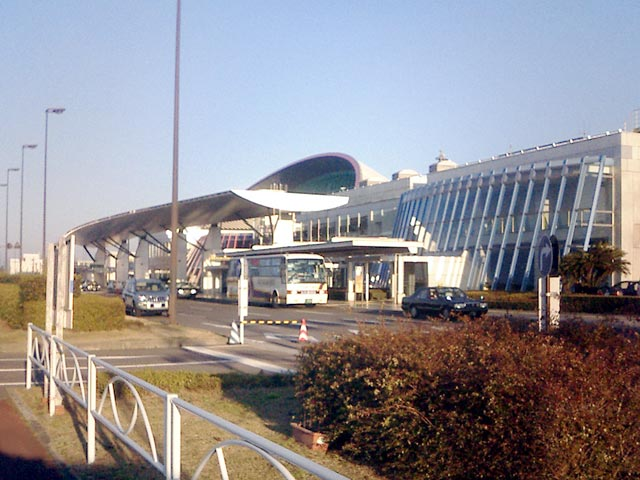
- IATA: TAK; ICAO: RJOT

Summary
- Airport type: Public
- Operator: Ministry of Land, Infrastructure, Transport and Tourism
- Location: Takamatsu, Kagawa Prefecture, Japan
- Elevation AMSL: 607 ft (185 m)
- Coordinates: 34°12′51″N 134°00′56″E

Map
- Location in Kagawa Prefecture Location in Japan

Runways
Direction	Length		Surface
Direction	m	ft	Surface
08/26	2,500	8,202	Asphalt/concrete

Statistics (2015)
- Passengers: 1,809,820
- Cargo (metric tonnes): 6,994
- Aircraft movement: 17,947
- Source: Japanese Ministry of Land, Infrastructure, Transport and Tourism

Takamatsu Airport (高松空港, Takamatsu Kūkō) (IATA: TAK, ICAO: RJOT) is an airport located 8 NM (15 km; 9.2 mi) south-southwest of Takamatsu, Kagawa, Japan. The airport primarily handles domestic flights, with a small number of international flights mainly to Hong Kong, South Korea and Taiwan.

Opened in 1990, the airport replaced the former airport which has been served as civilian for 35 years.

== Operations ==
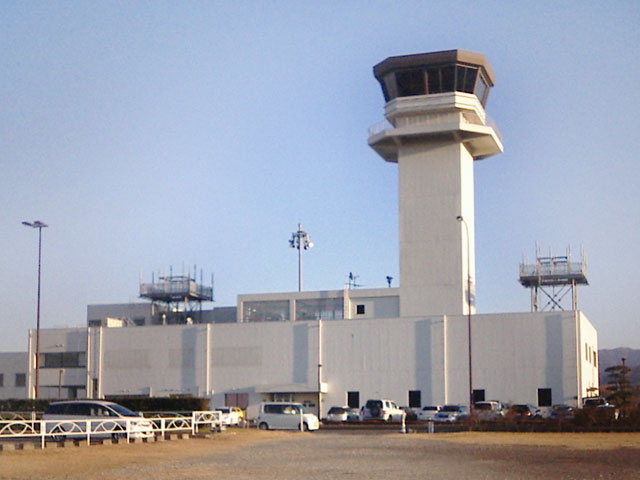
Air traffic control towers

Takamatsu Airport is equipped with an Instrument Landing System, VHF Omni-directional Radio Range, Distance Measuring Equipment, Airport Surveillance Radar, approach lights, precision approach angle guidance lights, and more.

On January 16, 2013, an All Nippon Airways Boeing 787 (Flight NH692) made an emergency landing at Takamatsu after reporting a battery problem in flight. That aircraft was flying to Haneda Airport during that incident.

== Terminal ==
Takamatsu Airport has one terminal/concourse consisting of four main gates. The first three gates are used primarily by All Nippon Airways and Japan Airlines. The other gate is primarily for international flights and is connected to the international side of the lobby via an escalator up to the security checkpoint. However, the international and domestic sides of the terminal are not separated. Shops are located on the first and second floors including restaurants and cafes. An outdoor observation deck is located on the 3rd floor directly overlooking the four main gates.

== Airlines and destinations ==
Airlines	Destinations
Air Busan	Busan
Air Seoul	Seoul–Incheon
All Nippon Airways	Naha, Tokyo–Haneda
China Airlines	Taipei–Taoyuan
HK Express	Hong Kong
Japan Airlines	Tokyo–Haneda
Jetstar Japan	Tokyo–Narita
Jin Air	Seoul–Incheon
Starlux Airlines	Taichung

== Access ==
=== Buses ===
Stop No.	Name	Via	Destination	Company	Note
0	Kotobus Express Udon Airport Shuttle	Kotohira Station・Yumetown Mitoyo・Mitoyo City Hall	Mitoyo (Chichibu ga hama)	Kotohira Bus	Expressway bus
0	Kotobus Express Iya Valley	Awa-Ikeda Station・Ōboke Station	Iya Valley	Kotohira Bus	Expressway bus
0	Kotobus Express Kochi Line	Non stop	Kochi Station (Kochi)	Kotohira Bus	Expressway bus
0	Takamatsu Airport Limousine Bus	Marugame Station・Zentsuji Station・Kan'onji Station	Shikokuchūō	Kawata Group	Expressway bus
1	Airport bus Kotohira Line	Okada Station (Kagawa)・Kotohira Station	Kotoden-Kotohira Station	Kinku Bus	
2	Airport bus	Kūkōdōri Station・Yumetown Takamatsu・Ritsurin Park・Takamatsu-Chikko Station	JR HOTEL Clement Takamatsu・Takamatsu Station	Kotoden Bus	Time schedule is changed once a month to coincide with timetable of airplane.
3	Yusa Line [44]	Enza Station・Ritsurin Park・Kawaramachi Station (Kagawa)・Takamatsu-Chikko Station	Takamatsu Station	Kotoden Bus	Time schedule is not timed to coincide with timetable of airplane.
4	Airport bus Marugame・Sakaide Line	Ayagawa Station・Sakaide Station・Utazu Station	Marugame Station	Kotosan Bus	Passengers are able to get on and off between Ayakawa Station and Marugame Station excluding the last service.
4	Airport bus Marugame・Zentsuji Line	Zentsuji Station	Marugame Station	Kotosan Bus	
