= Shioiri Station =

Shioiri Station is the name of multiple train stations in Japan.

- Shioiri Station (Kagawa) - (塩入駅) in Kagawa Prefecture
- Shioiri Station (Kanagawa) - (汐入駅) in Kanagawa Prefecture
