= Konzōji Station =

Railway station in Zentsūji, Kagawa Prefecture, Japan

D13 Konzōji Station 金蔵寺駅
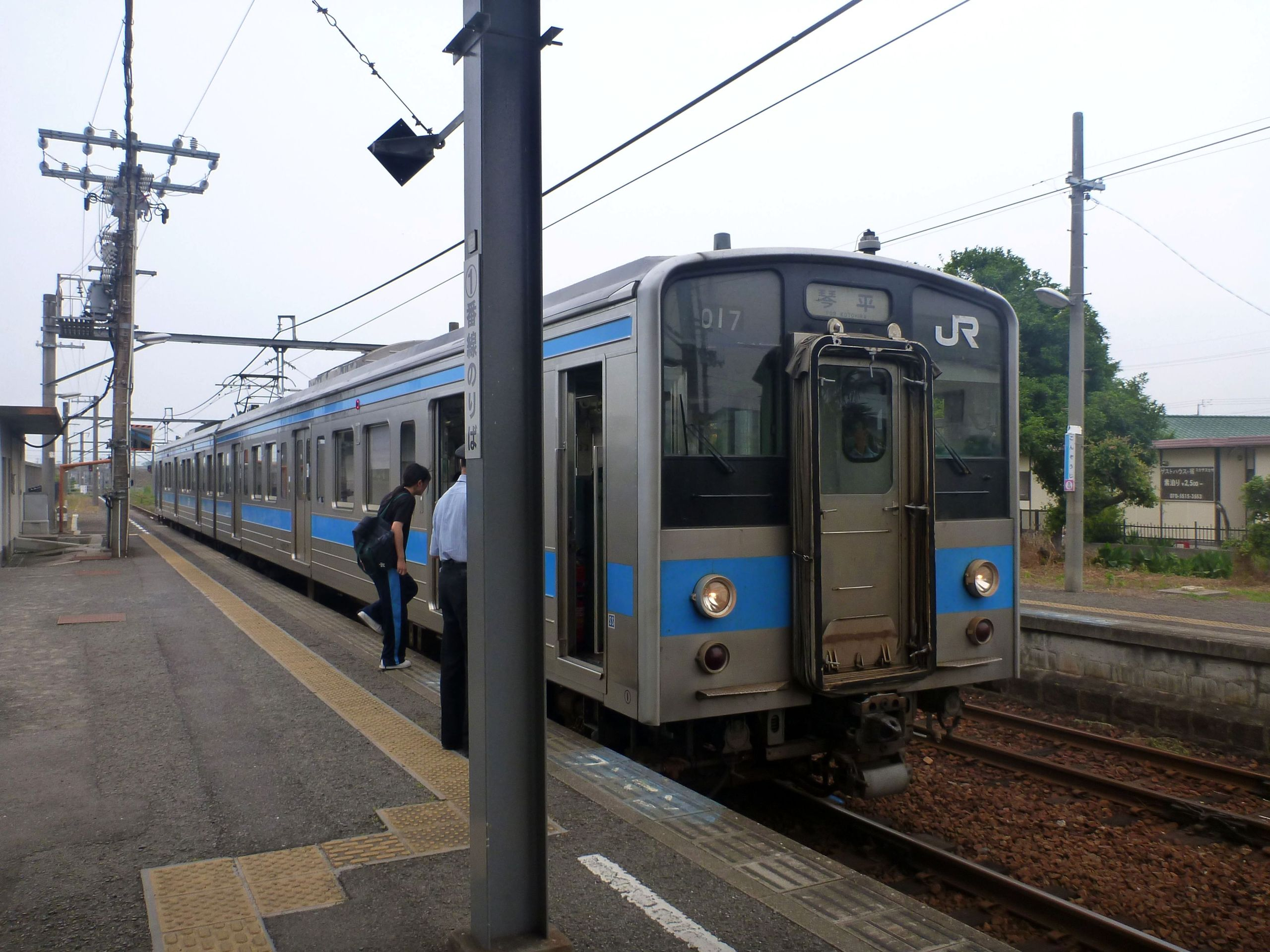
- Konzōji Station in 2016

General information
- Location: Inagicho, Zentsuji-shi, Kagawa-ken 765-0022; Japan
- Coordinates: 34°14′52″N 133°46′40″E
- Operator: JR Shikoku
- Line: ■ Dosan Line
- Distance: 3.7 km (2.3 mi) from Tadotsu
- Platforms: 2 side platforms
- Tracks: 2

Construction
- Structure type: At grade
- Accessible: Yes - platforms linked by level crossing

Other information
- Status: Unstaffed
- Station code: D13

History
- Opened: 6 October 1896

Passengers
- FY2019: 275
Location
- Location within Tokushima Prefecture Location within Japan

Konzōji Station (金蔵寺駅, Konzōji-eki) is a passenger railway station located in the city of Zentsūji, Kagawa Prefecture, Japan. It is operated by JR Shikoku and has the station number "D13".

== Lines ==
Konzōji Station is served by the JR Shikoku Dosan Line and is located 3.7 km (2.3 mi) from the beginning of the line at Tadotsu.

== Layout ==
The station, which is unstaffed, consists of two opposed side platforms serving two tracks. A small tiled concrete building serves as a waiting room and is linked to platform 1. Access to platform 2 is by means of a level crossing.

== Adjacent stations ==
«	Service	»
Dosan Line
Tadotsu	Local	Zentsūji

== History ==
Konzōji Station opened on 6 October 1896, as an additional station of the existing track built by the Sanuki Railway (讃岐鉄道, Sanuki Tetsudo) from Tadotsu to Kotohira. On 1 December 1904, the railway was acquired by the Sanyō Railway (山陽鉄道, San'yō-tetsudō) and the station formed part of the Yosan Line. The Sanyō Railway was nationalized on 1 December 1906, and the station came under the control of Japanese Government Railways (JGR) which renamed the network the Sanuki Line, and later, the Yosan Mainline. On 28 November 1935, the stretch from Tadotsu to Awa-Ikeda, including Konzōji, was separated out and became the Dosan Line. Japanese National Railways (JNR), the successor to JGR, was privatized on 1 April 1987, and control of the station passed to JR Shikoku.

== Surrounding area ==
- Konzō-ji (金倉寺), the 76th temple on the Shikoku Pilgrimage is about 400 metres to the northeast of the station.

== See also ==
- List of railway stations in Japan
