= Kurokawa Station =

Kurokawa Station is a name for multiple stations in Japan.

1. Kurokawa Station (Hyogo) - In Hyogo Prefecture
2. Kurokawa Station (Kagawa) - In Kagawa Prefecture
3. Kurokawa Station (Kanagawa) - In Kanagawa Prefecture
4. Kurokawa Station (Nagoya) - In Nagoya, Aichi Prefecture
