= Kurokawa (surname) =

Kurokawa (written: 黒川 or 黒河, lit. 'black river') is a Japanese surname. Notable people with the surname include:

- Atsushi Kurokawa (黒川 淳史, born 1998), Japanese footballer
- Eiji Kurokawa (黒河 影次), an alias used by Shōji Kawamori (born 1960), Japanese anime producer
- Hideaki Kurokawa (黒川 秀明, born 1944), Japanese ice hockey player
- Keisuke Kurokawa (黒川 圭介, born 1997), Japanese footballer
- Kisho Kurokawa (黒川 紀章, 1934–2007), Japanese architect
- Mei Kurokawa (黒川 芽以, born 1987), Japanese actress and singer
- Mitsuya Kurokawa (黒川 照家, 1951–2020), Japanese guitarist
- Nami Kurokawa (黒河 奈美, born 1980), Japanese voice actress
- Nobushige Kurokawa (黒川 信重, born 1952), Japanese mathematician
- Sōya Kurokawa (黒川 想矢, born 2009), Japanese young actor
- Suizan Kurokawa (黒川 翠山, 1882–1944), Japanese photographer
- Syo Kurokawa (黒川 逍, 1926–2010), Japanese lichenologist and recipient of Acharius Medal
- Takaya Kurokawa (黒河 貴矢, born 1981), Japanese footballer
- Tama Kurokawa, Lady Arnold (1869–1962), only Japanese woman bearing an English title in 1897, wife of Edwin Arnold
- Tomoka Kurokawa (黒川 智花, born 1989), Japanese actress
- Yatarō Kurokawa (黒川 弥太郎, 1910–1984), Japanese actor

== Fictional characters ==
- Ellen Kurokawa (黒川 エレン), a character in Suite PreCure
- Hana Kurokawa (黒川 花), a character in Reborn!
- Izana Kurokawa (黒川 イザナ), a character in Tokyo Revengers
- Kenichi Kurokawa (黒川 健一), a character in Mezzo Forte
- Akane Kurokawa (黒川 茜), a character in Oshi no Ko
