= Tsubojiri Station =

Railway station in Miyoshi, Tokushima Prefecture, Japan

D19 Tsubojiri Station 坪尻駅
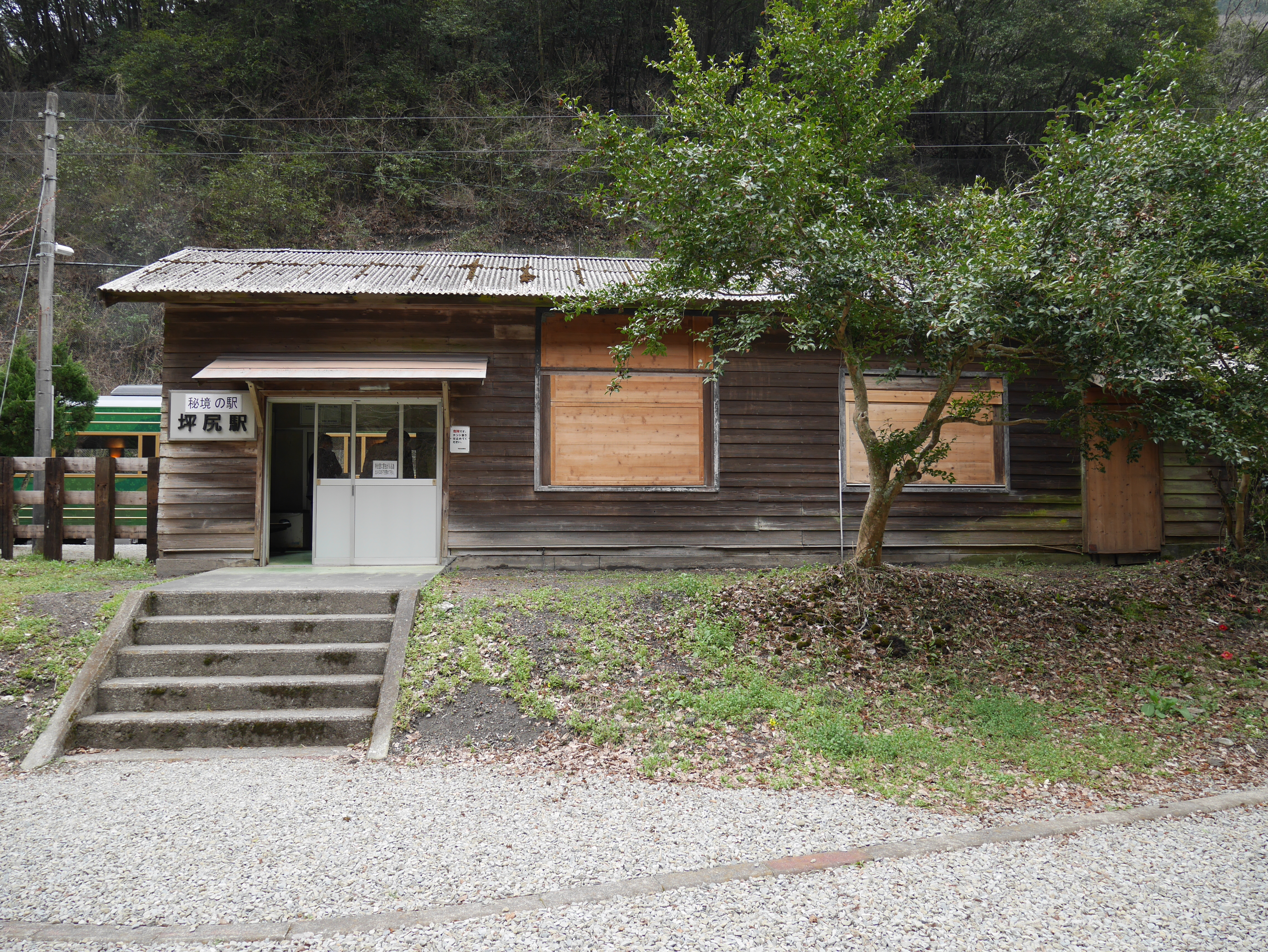
- Tsubojiri station in 2017

General information
- Location: Ikedacho Nishiyama, Miyoshi, Tokushima Prefecture, 778-0040; Japan
- Coordinates: 34°03′14″N 133°49′26″E
- Operator: JR Shikoku
- Line: ■ Dosan Line
- Distance: 32.1 km (19.9 mi) from Tadotsu
- Platforms: 1 side platform
- Tracks: 1
- Train operators: JR Shikoku
- Connections: None (No road access)

Construction
- Parking: No
- Cycle facilities: No
- Accessible: No (Approached by a mountain path)

Other information
- Status: Unstaffed
- Station code: D19

History
- Opened: 10 January 1950

Passengers
- FY2019: 2
Location
- Location within Tokushima Prefecture Location within Japan

Tsubojiri Station (坪尻駅, Tsubojiri-eki) is a passenger railway station located in the city of Miyoshi, Tokushima Prefecture, Japan. It is operated by JR Shikoku and has the station number "D19".

== Lines ==
Tsubojiri Station is served by JR Shikoku's Dosan Line and is located 32.1 km (19.9 mi) from the beginning of the line at Tadotsu.

== Layout ==
The station is located in a deep river ravine with high mountains on both sides. It consists of a side platform serving a single track. A wooden building adjacent to the side platform serves as a passenger waiting room. There is no access road. From the nearest main road, National Route 32, it is necessary to descend by a mountain footpath and then cross the tracks via a pedestrian level crossing in order to reach the station.

The station is on a siding located at a lower level from the main track. There is no through service to the station and a switchback manoeuvre is required to use the station. Trains approaching from Tadotsu need to enter a siding and then reverse direction and back into the station siding. Trains approaching from Kochi can enter the station siding directly but upon departure, need to execute the switchback, entering a siding and reversing direction before accessing the main track in the direction of Tadotsu.

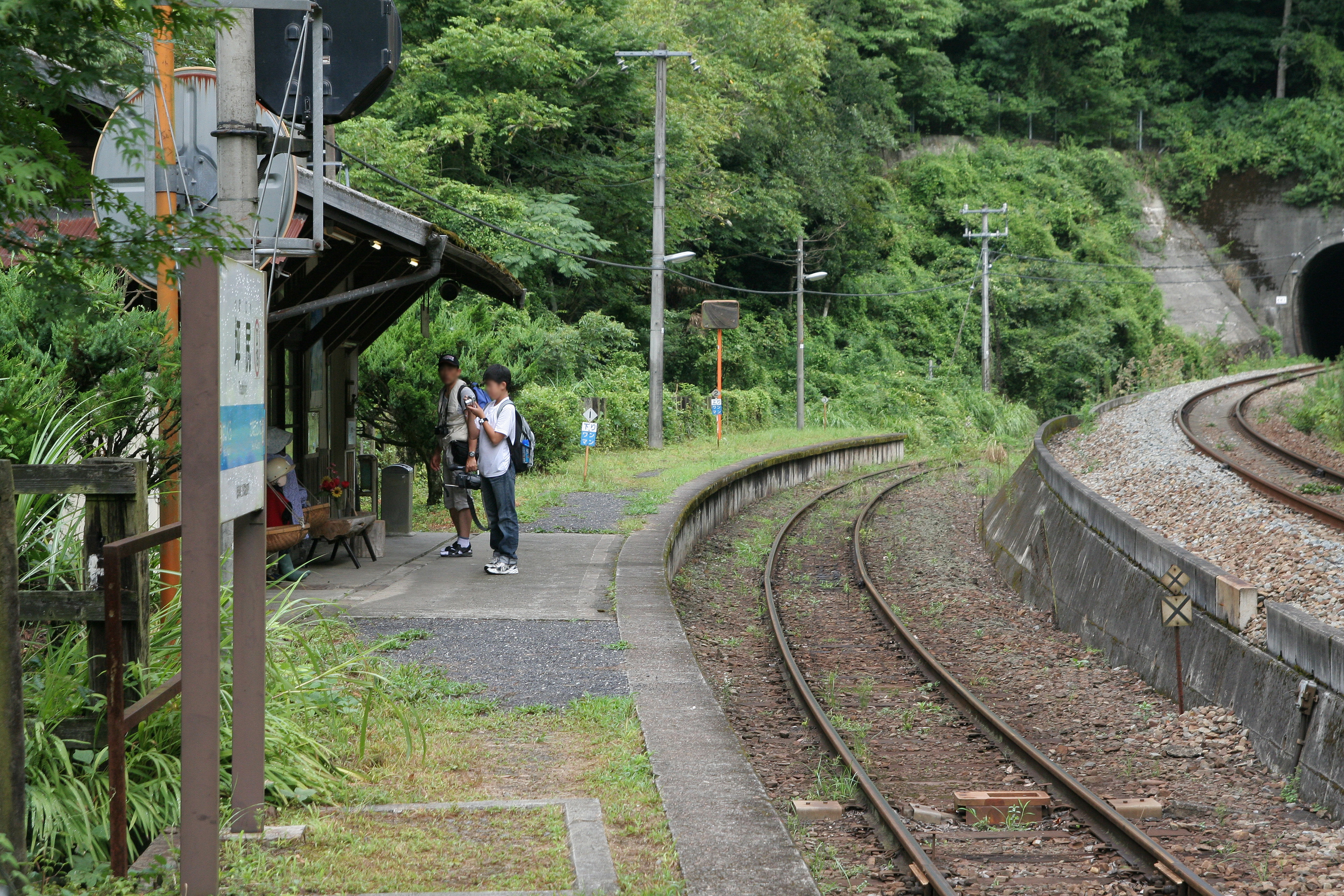
A view of the station platform. Note the difference in level between the siding and the main track.

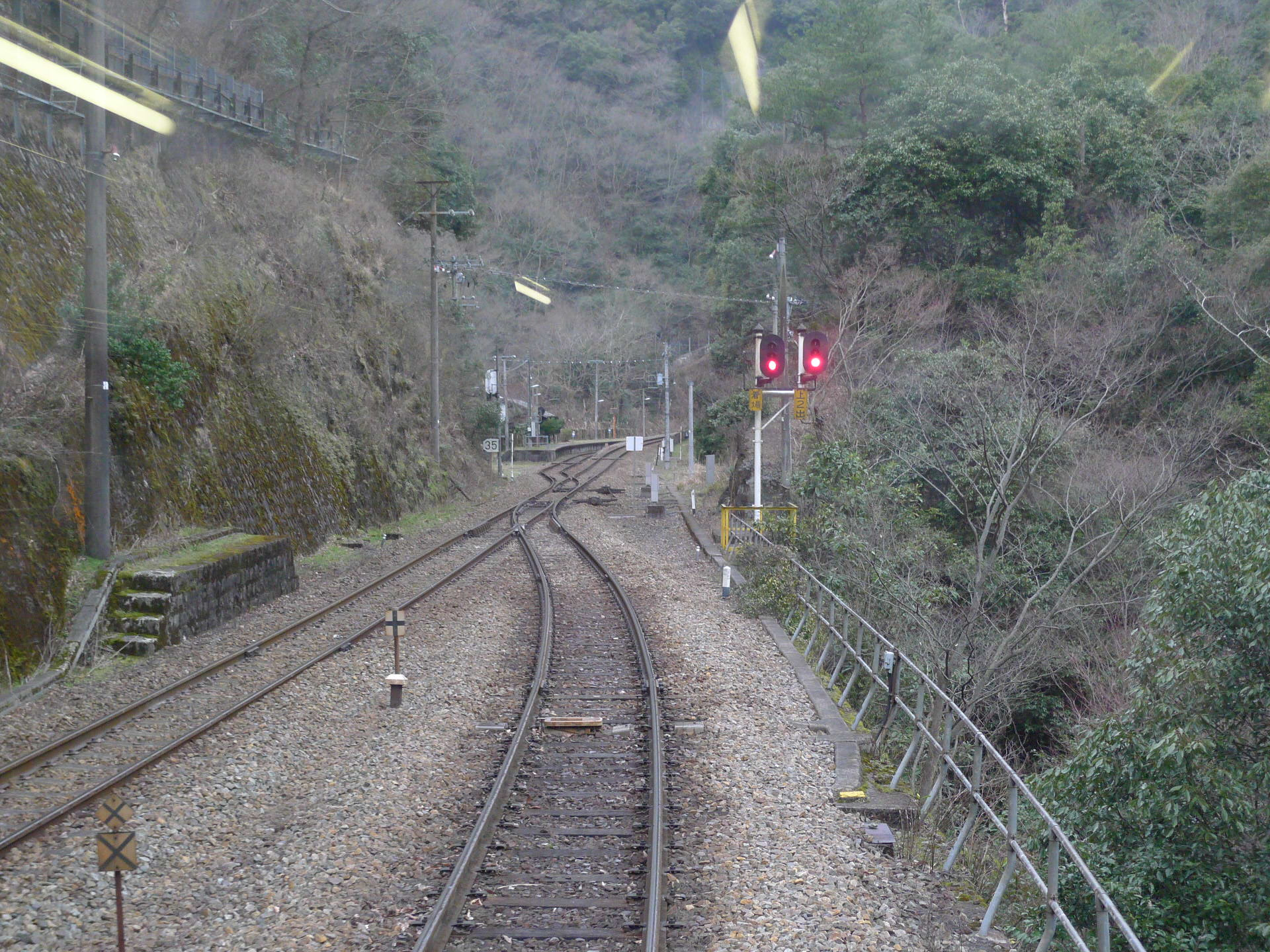
Cab view from a train. The train has entered a siding from the main track and is reversing into the station siding.

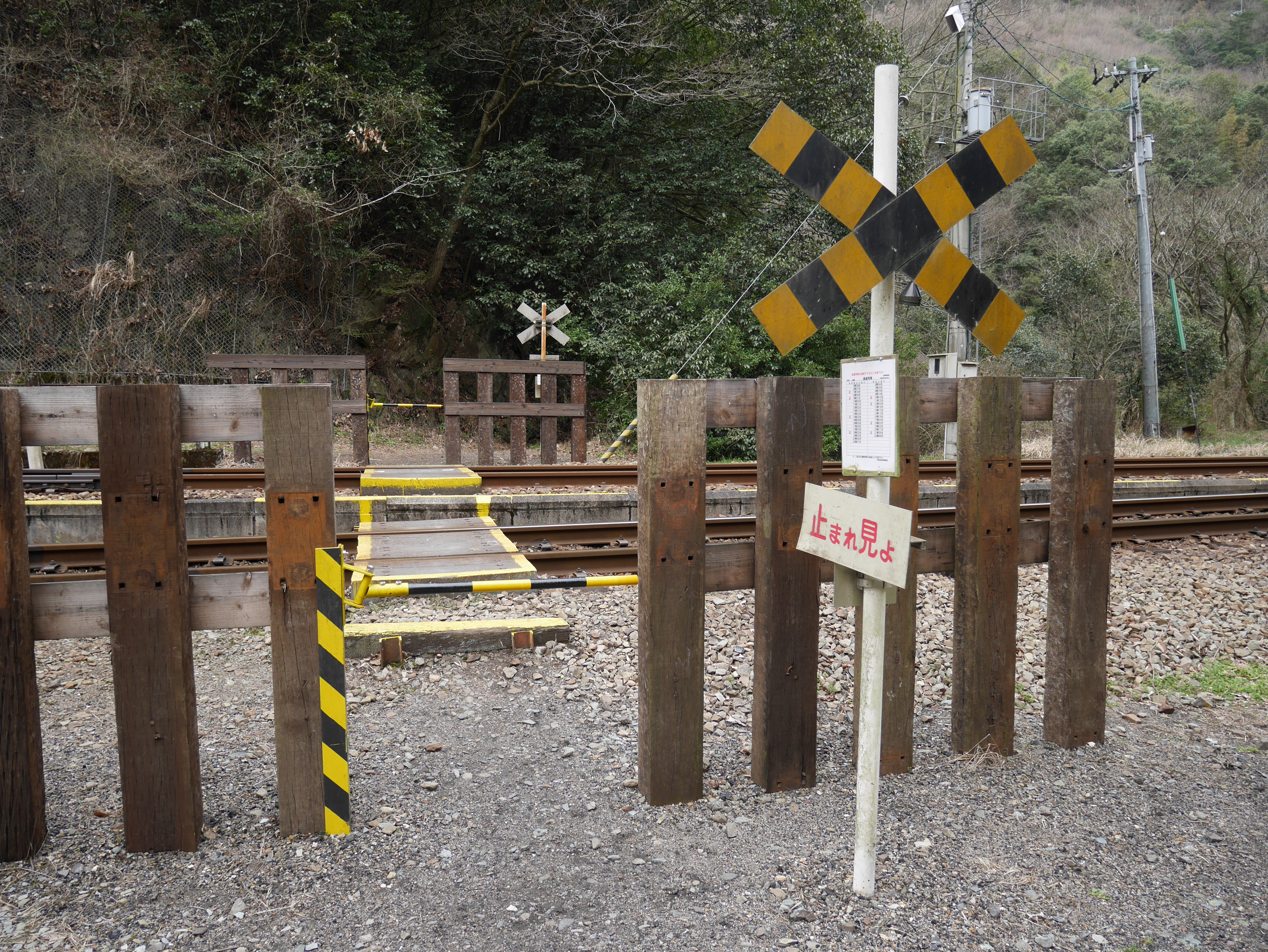
To reach the nearest main road, it is necessary to cross the tracks at this level crossing and then climb up a mountain path.

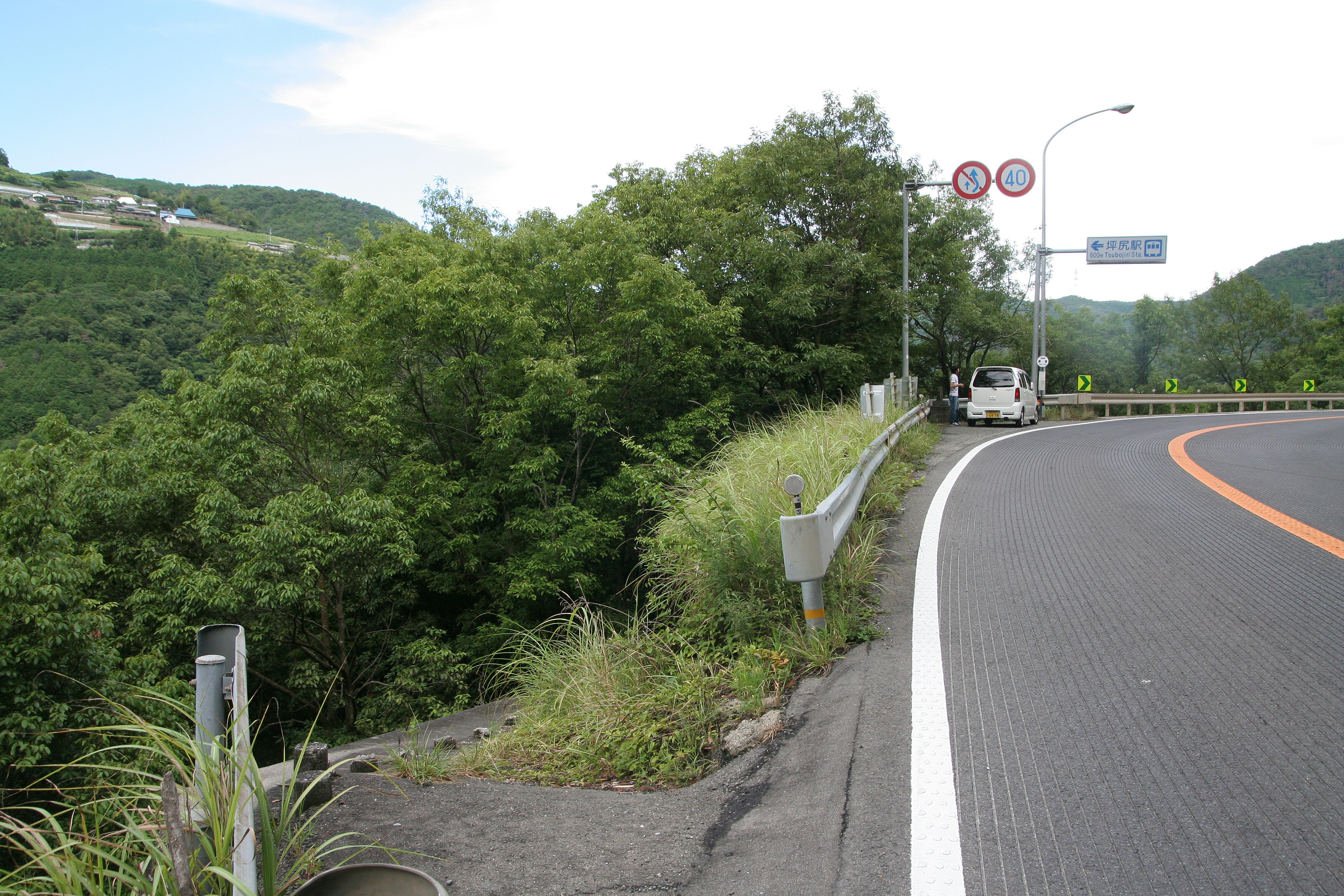
The entrance to mountain path leading to the station from the nearest main road.

== Adjacent stations ==
«	Service	»
Dosan Line
Sanuki-Saida	-	Hashikura

== History ==
The station opened on 28 April 1929 as Tsubojiri Signalbox (坪尻信号場) when the line was extended from Sanuki-Saida to Tsukuda Signalbox (now Tsukuda), thus linking up with the track of the Tokushima Line and providing service to Awa-Ikeda. At this time the line was known as the Sanyo Line and was operated by Japanese Government Railways (JGR) which later became Japanese National Railways (JNR). The station was upgraded to a passenger station on 1 October 1950. With the privatization of JNR on 1 April 1987, control of the station passed to JR Shikoku.

At the time of its upgrade to a station, a member of the Ministry of Transport was reported to have comically stated "The only passengers for the station will end up being monkeys and boars!" The story is referenced on a poster inside the waiting room of the station.

An eki stamp was placed in the station waiting room on May 15, 2008. However, it disappeared on February 10, 2010. A few months later, on April 22, the stamp was discovered by a JR East employee at Nakasawa Station on the Tsugaru Line in Aomori Prefecture, 1300 km away. The stamp was transported home, and a map showing its long round-trip journey was displayed in the waiting room.

== Surrounding area ==
Since the station is located in the valley along the Ayukutani River, it cannot be reached by car, and the only way to reach it is on foot, via a 600-meter mountain road to Tokushima Prefectural Road No. 5. However, the road is little more than a hiking path, often blocked by fallen trees, and there is a risk of falling off the cliff because there is no fence. Also, depending on the season, pit vipers and hornets may appear. Because of its remoteness and lack of accessibility, it is known as a hikyō station (secluded station) among rail fans.

== See also ==
- List of railway stations in Japan
- Hikyō station
