= Shioiri Station (Kagawa) =

Railway station in Mannō, Kagawa Prefecture, Japan

D16 Shioiri Station 塩入駅
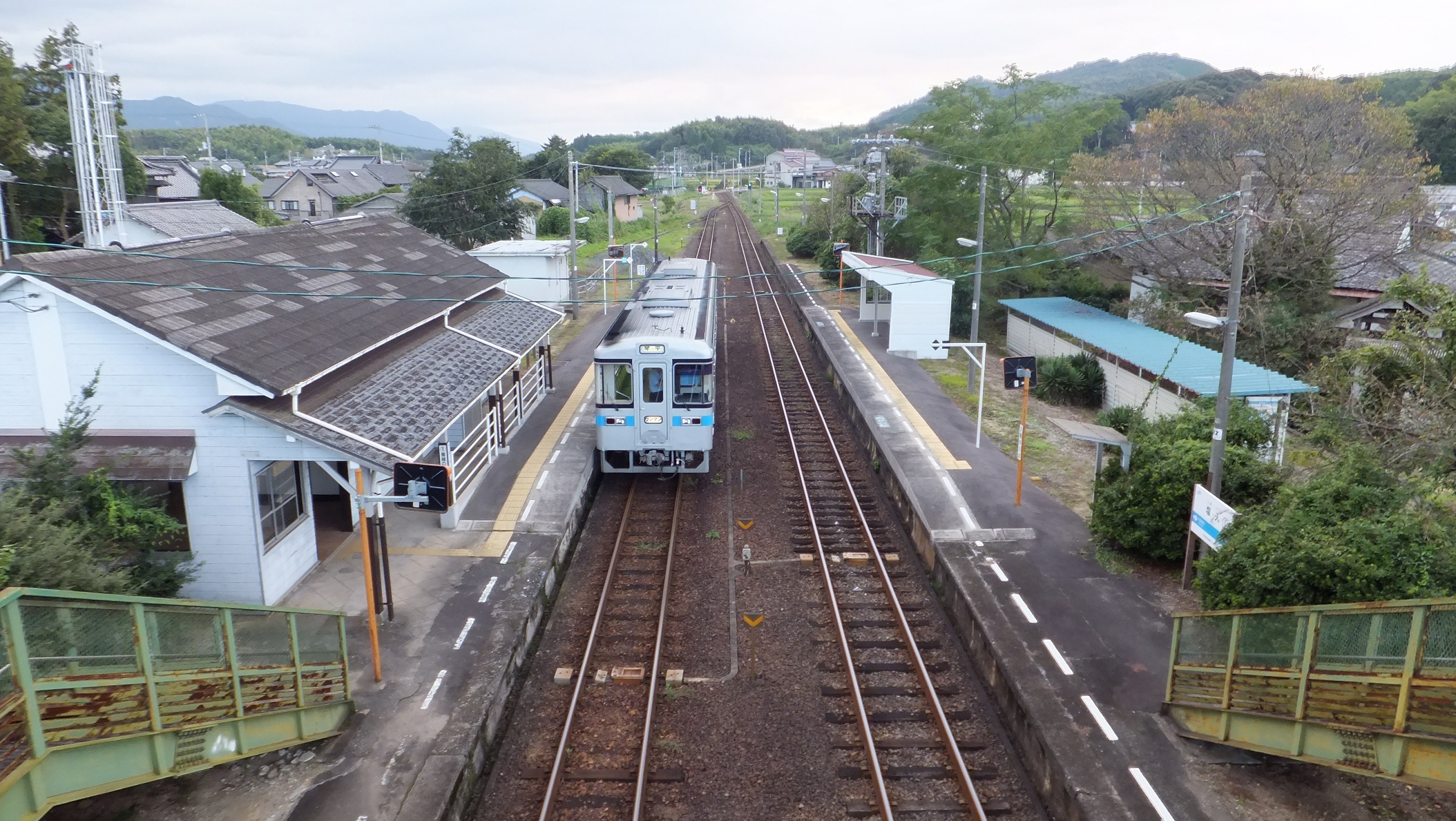
- Shiori Station in 2015

General information
- Location: Honoyama, Mannō-chō, Nakatado-gun, Kagawa-ken 769-0314; Japan
- Coordinates: 34°09′21″N 133°51′00″E
- Operator: JR Shikoku
- Line: ■ Dosan Line
- Distance: 17.7 km (11.0 mi) from Tadotsu
- Platforms: 2 side platforms
- Tracks: 2

Construction
- Parking: Available
- Cycle facilities: Bike shed
- Accessible: Yes - both platforms accessible from their own access roads

Other information
- Status: Unstaffed
- Station code: D16

History
- Opened: 21 May 1923

Passengers
- FY2019: 50
Location
- Location within Kagawa Prefecture Location within Japan

Shioiri Station (塩入駅, Shioiri-eki) is a passenger railway station located in the town of Mannō, Nakatado District, Kagawa Prefecture, Japan. It is operated by JR Shikoku and has the station number "D16".

== Lines ==
Shioiri Station is served by JR Shikoku's Dosan Line and is located 17.7 km (11.0 mi) from the beginning of the line at Tadotsu.

== Layout ==
The station, which is unstaffed, consists of two side platforms serving two tracks. A building adjacent to one platform serves as a passenger waiting room. An overhead foot bridge leads to the other platform but this platform may also be entered from its own access road. Parking and a bike shed are provided.

== Adjacent stations ==
«	Service	»
Dosan Line
Kotohira	-	Kurokawa

== History ==
Shioiri Station opened on 21 May 1923 as a through-station operated by Japanese Government Railways (later becoming Japanese National Railways or JNR) when the then Sanuki Line (讃岐線) from Tadotsu to Kotohira was extended to Sanuki-Saida. With the privatization of JNR on 1 April 1987, control of the station passed to JR Shikoku.

== Surrounding area ==
- Mannou Town Nakaminami Branch
- Mannou Municipal Nakaminami Elementary School

== See also ==
- List of railway stations in Japan
