= Kurokawa Station (Kagawa) =

Railway station in Mannō, Kagawa Prefecture, Japan

D17 Kurokawa Station 黒川駅
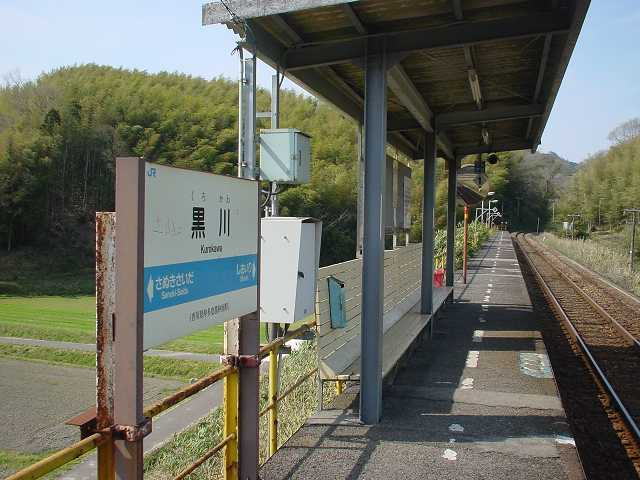
- Kurokawa Station, April 2005

General information
- Location: Shinme, Mannō-chō, Nakatado-gun, Kagawa-ken 769-0317; Japan
- Coordinates: 34°07′59″N 133°49′12″E
- Operator: JR Shikoku
- Line: ■ Dosan Line
- Distance: 21.6 km (13.4 mi) from Tadotsu
- Platforms: 1 side platform
- Tracks: 1

Construction
- Cycle facilities: Bike shed
- Accessible: No - steps lead up to platform

Other information
- Status: Unstaffed
- Station code: D17

History
- Opened: 1 October 1961

Passengers
- FY2019: 40
Location
- Location within Kagawa Prefecture Location within Japan

Kurokawa Station (黒川駅, Kurokawa-eki) is a passenger railway station located in the town of Mannō, Nakatado District, Kagawa Prefecture, Japan. It is operated by JR Shikoku and has the station number "D17".

== Lines ==
Kurokawa Station is served by JR Shikoku's Dosan Line and is located 21.6 km (13.4 mi) from the beginning of the line at Tadotsu.

== Layout ==
The station, which is unstaffed, consists of a side platform serving a single track tracks on an embankment high above the surrounding farmland. There is no station building, only a shelter for waiting passengers. A flight of steps leads up from the access road to the platform and the station is thus not wheelchair accessible. There is a bike shed by the side of the access road.

== Adjacent stations ==
| « | Service | » |
Dosan Line
| Shioiri | Local | Sanuki-Saida |

== History ==
Kurokawa Station opened on 1 October 1961 under the control of Japanese National Railways (JNR). With the privatization of JNR on 1 April 1987, control of the station passed to JR Shikoku.

== Surrounding area ==
The station is located in a rural area surrounded by rice fields.

== See also ==
- List of railway stations in Japan
