= Suizan Kurokawa =

Japanese photographer

Suizan Kurokawa (黒川 翠山, Kurokawa Suizan; 1882–1944) was a Japanese photographer.
