= Sanuki-Saida Station =

Railway station in Mitoyo, Kagawa Prefecture, Japan

D18 Sanuki-Saida Station 讃岐財田駅
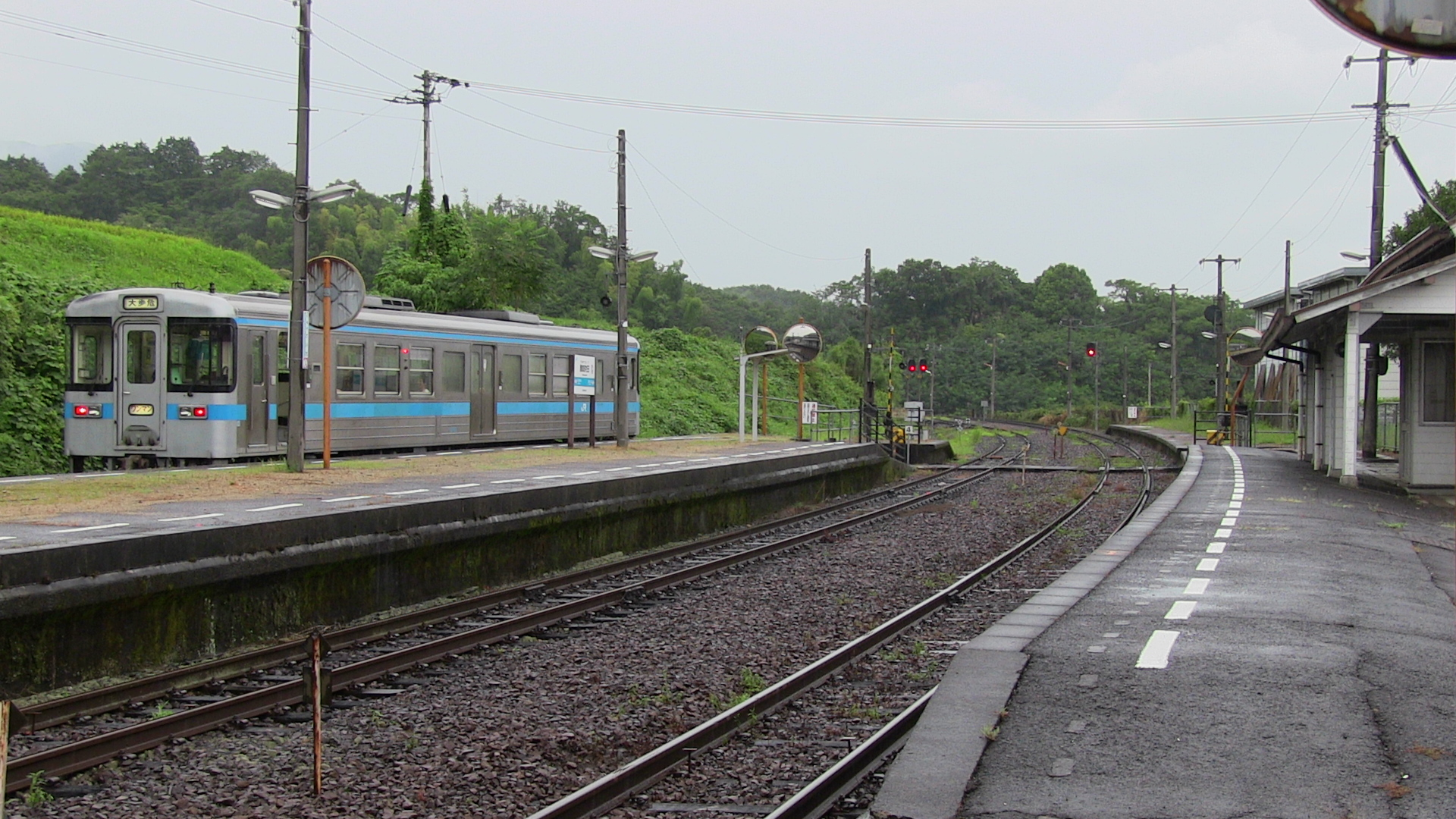
- The platforms of Sanuki-Saida Station in 2013. Note the pedestrian level crossing to the island platform.

General information
- Location: Saitacho Saitakami, Mitoyo, Kagawa Prefecture, 769-0401; Japan
- Coordinates: 34°07′02″N 133°48′54″E
- Operator: JR Shikoku
- Line: ■ Dosan Line
- Distance: 23.9 km (14.9 mi) from Tadotsu
- Platforms: 1 island platform, 1 side platform
- Tracks: 3

Construction
- Parking: Available
- Accessible: Yes - platforms are linked by ramps and a pedestrian level crossing

Other information
- Status: Unstaffed
- Station code: D18

History
- Opened: 21 May 1923

Passengers
- FY2019: 16
Location
- Location within Tokushima Prefecture Location within Japan

Sanuki-Saida Station (讃岐財田駅, Sanuki-Saida-eki) is a passenger railway station located in the city of Mitoyo, Kagawa Prefecture, Japan. It is operated by JR Shikoku and has the station number "D18".

== Lines ==
Sanuki-Saida Station is served by JR Shikoku's Dosan Line and is located 23.9 km (14.9 mi) from the beginning of the line at Tadotsu.

== Layout ==
The station, which is unstaffed, consists of a side platform and an island platform serving three tracks. A building adjacent to the side platform serves as a passenger waiting room. A pedestrian level crossing spanning two tracks gives access to the island platform. Parking and a bike shed are available.

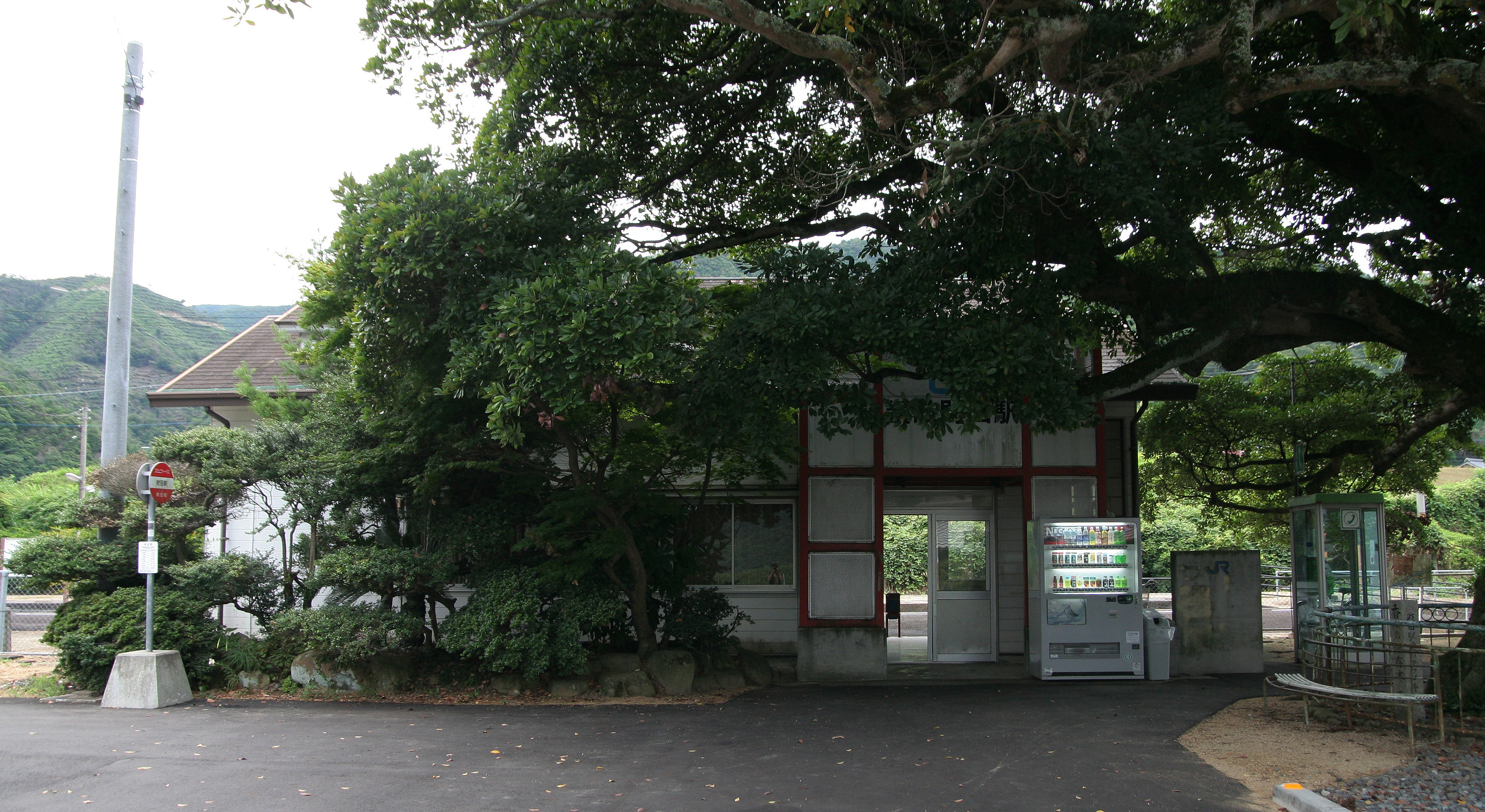
Front entrance of the station building. The large tree in the foreground is an 800-year old tabunoki tree.

== Adjacent stations ==
«	Service	»
Dosan Line
Kurokawa	-	Tsubojiri

== History ==
Sanuki-Saida Station opened on 21 May 1923 when the then Sanuki Line (讃岐線), operated by Japanese Government Railways (later becoming Japanese National Railways (JNR) was extended from Kotohira to Sanuki-Saida. With the privatization of JNR on 1 April 1987, control of the station passed to JR Shikoku.

== Surrounding area ==
- An 800-year old tabunoki tree near the station entrance is designated Kagawa Prefectural Protected Tree No. 92.
- A broadleaf forest with tabunoki trees at the Itsukushima Shinto shrine (厳島神社) is a designated Kagawa Prefectural Natural Monument.

== See also ==
- List of railway stations in Japan
