= Zentsūji Station =

Railway station in Zentsūji, Kagawa Prefecture, Japan

D14 Zentsūji Station 善通寺駅
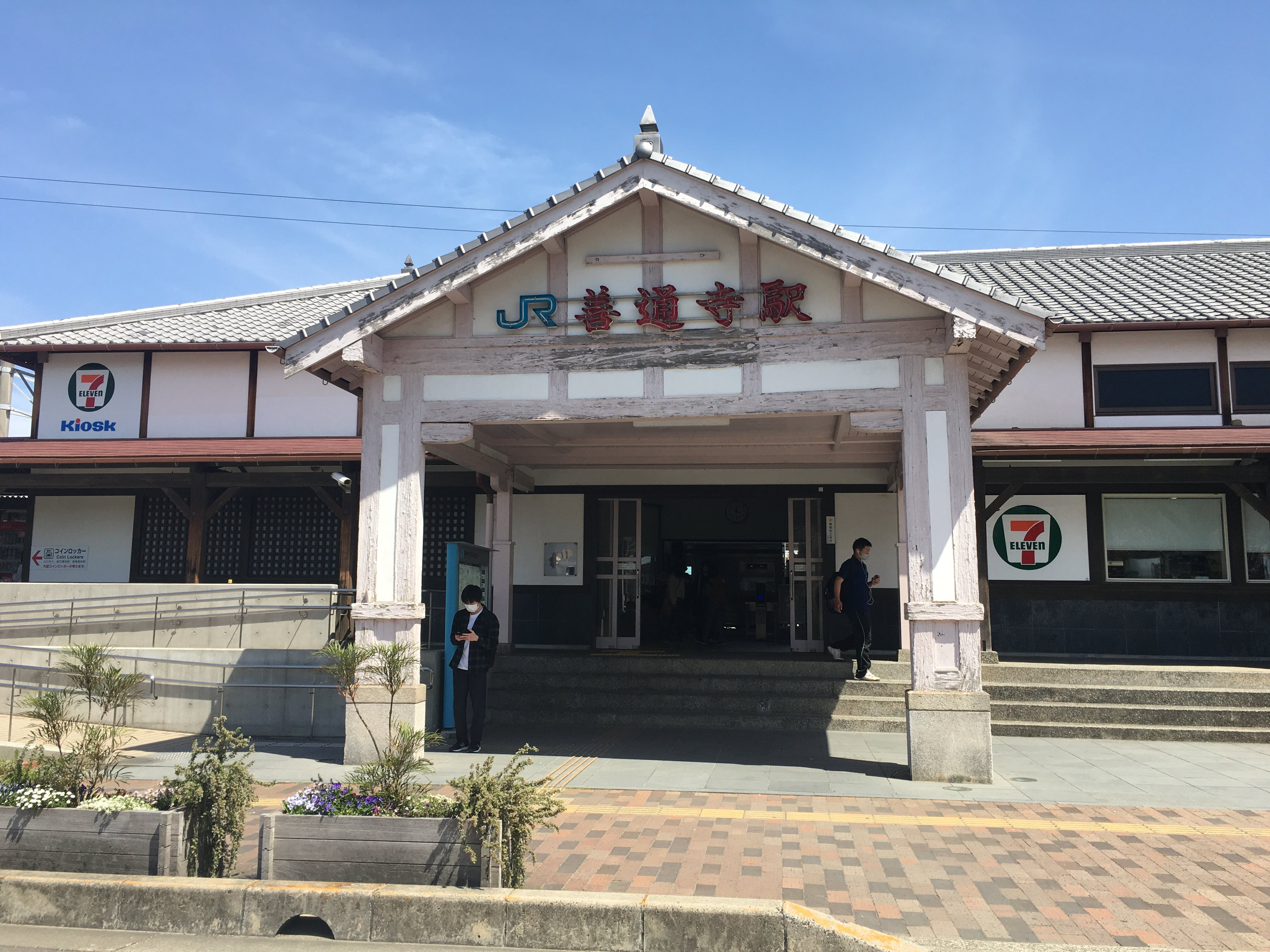
- Zentsūji Station, 2021

General information
- Location: 1-7 Bunkyōchō, Zentsuji-shi, Kagawa-ken 765-0013; Japan
- Coordinates: 34°13′47.8″N 133°47′20.9″E
- Operator: JR Shikoku
- Line: ■ Dosan Line
- Distance: 6.0 km (3.7 mi) from Tadotsu
- Platforms: 1 side + 1 island platform
- Tracks: 1
- Train operators: JR Shikoku

Other information
- Status: Staffed
- Station code: D14
- Website: Official website

History
- Opened: 23 May 1889

Passengers
- FY2023: 1,175
Location
- Location within Kagawa Prefecture Location within Japan

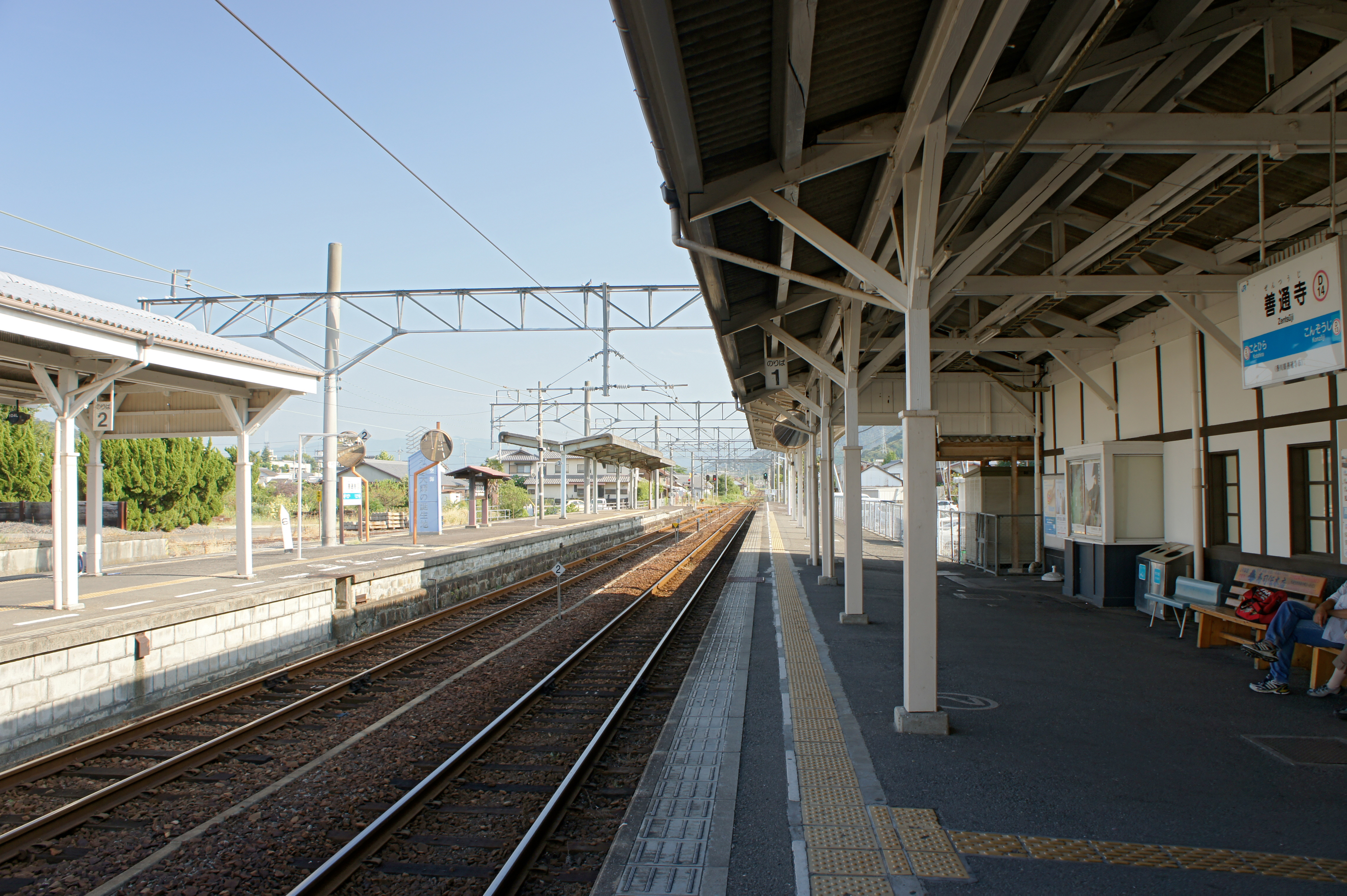
Platform

Zentsūji Station (善通寺駅, Zentsūji-eki) is a passenger railway station located in the city of Zentsūji, Kagawa Prefecture, Japan. It is operated by JR Shikoku and has the station number "D14".

== Lines ==
Zentsūji Station is served by JR Shikoku's Dosan Line and is located 6.0 km (3.7 mi) from the beginning of the line at Tadotsu, and 38.7kilometers from Takamatsu

== Layout ==
Zentsūji Station is an above-ground station with one side platform and one island platform and three tracks. Platform 1 is the main platform for bi-directional traffic. Platform 2 is used when there is an issue the outbound sub-main line. As a general rule, Platform 3 is used only when shunting limited express trains. The platforms are connected by a footbridge. The station is staffed, but is unattended in the early morning and after 19:00.

== Adjacent stations ==
«	Service	»
JR Shikoku
Dosan Line
Konzōji	-	Kotohira

== History ==
Zentsūji Station opened on 23 May 1899 as Yoshida Station (吉田駅) and was renamed to its present name on June 15 of the same year. With the privatization of JNR on 1 April 1987, control of the station passed to JR Shikoku. The wooden station building was designated a Registered Tangible Cultural Property in 2002.

== Surrounding area ==
- Zentsū-ji, temple 75 on the Shikoku pilgrimage
- Japan Ground Self-Defense Force Zentsuji Garrison
- Jinsei Gakuen High School
- Kagawa Prefectural Zentsuji First High School

== See also ==
- List of railway stations in Japan
