= Dosan Line =

Railway line in Japan

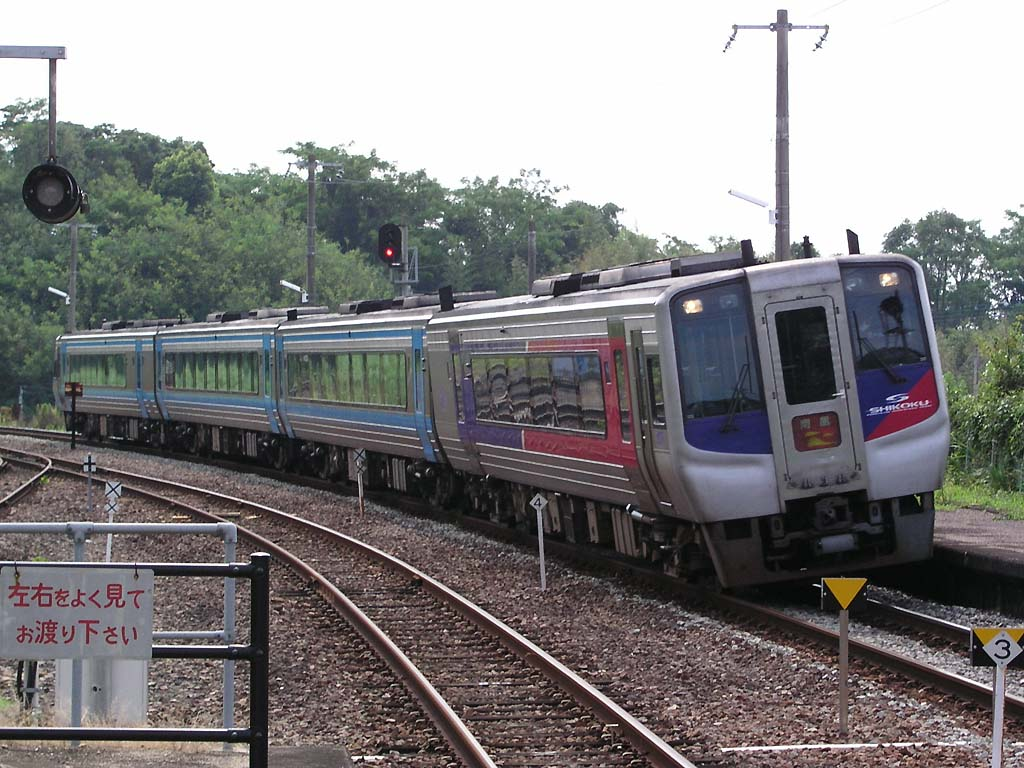
- Nanpū 2000 series DMU at Sanuki-Saida Station

Overview
- Status: In operation
- Owner: JR Shikoku
- Locale: Kagawa, Tokushima, Kōchi Prefectures
- Termini: Tadotsu; Kubokawa
- Stations: 61

Service
- Type: Heavy rail

History
- Opened: 23 May 1889; 135 years ago
- Completed: 12 November 1951; 73 years ago

Technical
- Line length: 198.7 km (123.5 mi)
- Number of tracks: 1
- Character: Rural
- Track gauge: 1,067 mm (3 ft 6 in)
- Minimum radius: 200 m (660 ft)
- Electrification: 1,500 V DC overhead catenary (Tadotsu - Kotohira)
- Operating speed: 120 km/h (75 mph)
Route map
Dosan Line

Dosan line train pulling into Zentsūji Station, 2021

The Dosan Line (土讃線, Dosan-sen) is a railway line in Shikoku, Japan, operated by the Shikoku Railway Company (JR Shikoku). It connects Tadotsu Station in Tadotsu, Kagawa, and Kubokawa Station in Shimanto, Kōchi. The line links the city of Kōchi with northern Shikoku and the island of Honshū via the Seto-Ōhashi Line. The first section of the line between Tadotsu and Kotohira opened in 1889, Kochi was connected to the northern section of the line in 1935, and the western extension of the line was completed in 1951. The name of the line comes from "Tosa" (土佐) and "Sanuki" (讃岐), the old provincial names of present-day Kōchi Prefecture and Kagawa Prefecture, respectively.

== History ==
The first section opened, between Tadotsu and Kotohira, was constructed by the Sanuki Railway Co. in 1889. The company was nationalised in 1906.

The Kotohira - Awa Ikeda section was opened in 1914 and connected to the Tokushima line.

The Susaki - Kochi - Kusaka section opened in 1924, and was extended north in sections 1925-35, where it connected to the northern section at Minawa, the line from Awa Ikeda having been extended there in 1931.

The Susaki - Tosakume section opened 1939, with extensions to Kageno opening 1947 and to Kubakawa in 1951.

CTC signalling was commissioned between Tadotsu - Kochi in 1967, and the 4,180m Oboke tunnel and associated realignment opened the following year.

The 2,583m Osugi tunnel and associated realignment opened in 1973. CTC signalling was extended to Kubokawa in 1986, and the Tadotsu - Kotohira section was electrified the following year prior to the privatization of JNR. However, the maximum speed of electric trains in this section is limited to 85 km/h due to the overhead catenary being a direct-line suspension system (similar to trams) as a result of a lack of funds during construction at the end of the JNR era. On the other hand, the diesel-powered limited express JR Shikoku 2000 series is able to run at 120 km/h, while regular diesel trains can run at 95 km/h. As such, the diesel trains operating in this section is able to run faster than electric trains. To reduce the burden on the overhead catenary, electric trains operate with only one raised pantograph in addition to the speed limit. The overhead catenary of platform 1 at Kotohira Station is the only section along the entire line to have a Simple Catenary System typically used on electrified JR lines.

After the privatization of JNR, there was a plan to electrify the Dosan Line to Awa-Ikeda along with the Yosan Line, but the former did not come to fruition. The reasoning being the low return on investments due to the sharp decline in traffic south of Kotohira, and the many narrow tunnels making the installation of overhead wires difficult. As such, it was decided that a more rational plan was to introduce new high-speed diesel trains for limited express operations as opposed to electrification. In a 2006 submission to the subcommittees of the Ministry of Land, Infrastructure, Transport and Tourism, JR Shikoku cited the electrification of the Kotohira - Kochi section as one of the desired long-term investments.

Freight trains ceased operating between Tadotsu - Kochi in 2005.

=== Former connecting lines ===
- Kotohira station - The Kotohira Express Railway Co. operated a 16 km line to Sakaide on the Yosan Line 1930-44, with the line formally closing in 1954.
- Tadotsu station - The Kotohira Sangu Railway Co. operated a 27 km line to Sakaide 1922/28 - 1963, with a 7 km branch to Kotohira operated 1923-63.

== Services ==
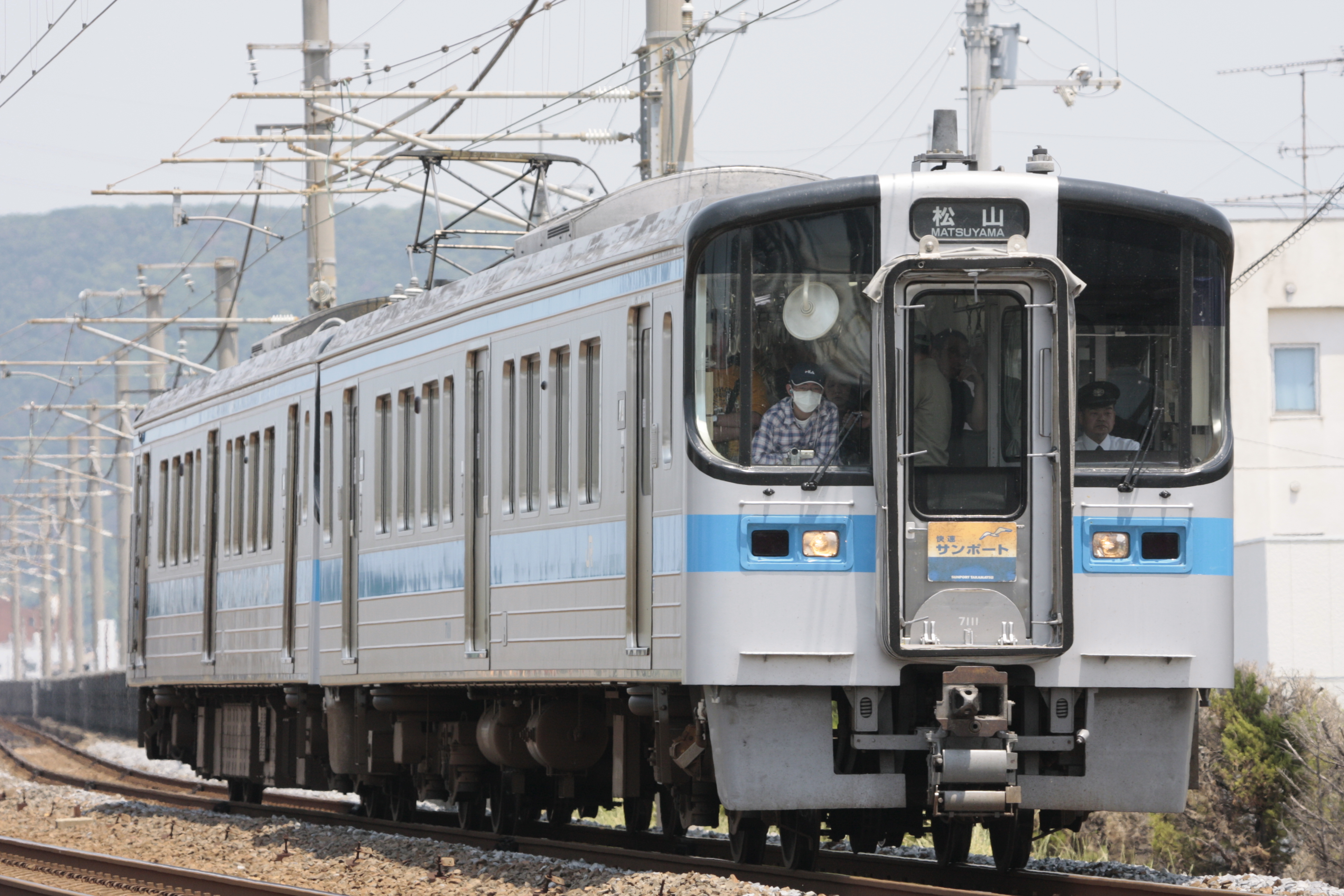
Rapid Sunport 7000 series EMU

Nanpū (南風) limited express trains make 14 round-trips per day between Okayama and Kōchi, Nakamura, or Sukumo. Shimanto (しまんと) limited expresses make five round trips per day between Takamatsu and Kōchi, Nakamura, or Sukumo. The Sunport (サンポート) rapid service trains link Kotohira and Takamatsu once an hour.

The line is generally divided into three parts for local services at Awa-Ikeda and Kōchi. For the segment between Tadotsu and Kotohira, there are through services to/from Okayama and Takamatsu. The Tosa Kuroshio Railway Gomen-Nahari Line has through service to/from Kōchi.

== Stations ==
- Local trains generally stop at all stations, but sometimes skip stations marked "▽".
- Sunport (Takamatsu - Tadotsu - Kotohira) rapid trains stop at all stations on the Dosan Line.
- See the articles on the Nanpū and Shimanto limited express services for details of station stops.
- Trains are able to pass each other at stations marked "◇" and "◆" (switchback); trains cannot pass at stations marked "｜".

Station No.	Station name	Japanese	Distance (km)		Transfers		Location	
Station No.	Station name	Japanese	Between stations	Total	Transfers		Location	
Through service to/from the Yosan Line and the Seto-Ōhashi Line
D12	Tadotsu	多度津	-	0.0	Yosan Line (Y12) (some trains through to Utazu)	◇	Tadotsu, Nakatado District	Kagawa
D13	Konzōji	金蔵寺	3.7	3.7		◇	Zentsūji	Kagawa
D14	Zentsūji	善通寺	2.3	6.0		◇	Zentsūji	Kagawa
D15	Kotohira	琴平	5.3	11.3	Kotoden Kotohira Line (Kotoden-Kotohira); Electrified section ends at this station	◇	Kotohira, Nakatado District	Kagawa
D16	Shioiri	塩入	6.4	17.7		◇	Mannō, Nakatado District	Kagawa
D17	Kurokawa	黒川	3.9	21.6		｜	Mannō, Nakatado District	Kagawa
D18	Sanuki-Saida	讃岐財田	2.3	23.9		◇	Mitoyo	Kagawa
D19	Tsubojiri▽	坪尻	8.2	32.1		◆	Miyoshi	Tokushima
D20	Hashikura	箸蔵	3.3	35.4		◇	Miyoshi	Tokushima
D21	Tsukuda	佃	3.4	38.8	Tokushima Line (B24)	◇	Miyoshi	Tokushima
D22	Awa-Ikeda	阿波池田	5.1	43.9	Tokushima Line (B25)	◇	Miyoshi	Tokushima
D23	Minawa	三縄	3.9	47.8		◇	Miyoshi	Tokushima
D24	Iyaguchi	祖谷口	4.5	52.3		｜	Miyoshi	Tokushima
D25	Awa-Kawaguchi	阿波川口	2.8	55.1		◇	Miyoshi	Tokushima
D26	Koboke	小歩危	4.7	59.8		◇	Miyoshi	Tokushima
D27	Ōboke	大歩危	5.7	65.5		◇	Miyoshi	Tokushima
D28	Tosa-Iwahara	土佐岩原	7.2	72.7		◇	Ōtoyo, Nagaoka District	Kōchi
D29	Toyonaga	豊永	4.0	76.7		◇	Ōtoyo, Nagaoka District	Kōchi
D30	Ōtaguchi	大田口	3.7	80.4		◇	Ōtoyo, Nagaoka District	Kōchi
D31	Tosa-Ananai	土佐穴内	2.8	83.2		｜	Ōtoyo, Nagaoka District	Kōchi
D32	Ōsugi	大杉	4.0	87.2		◇	Ōtoyo, Nagaoka District	Kōchi
D33	Tosa-Kitagawa	土佐北川	6.1	93.3		◇	Ōtoyo, Nagaoka District	Kōchi
D34	Kakumodani	角茂谷	2.2	95.5		｜	Ōtoyo, Nagaoka District	Kōchi
D35	Shigetō	繁藤	2.1	97.6		◇	Kami	Kōchi
D36	Shingai▽	新改	6.3	103.9		◆	Kami	Kōchi
D37	Tosa-Yamada	土佐山田	7.4	111.3		◇	Kami	Kōchi
D38	Yamada-Nishimachi▽	山田西町	0.8	112.1		｜	Kami	Kōchi
D39	Tosa-Nagaoka▽	土佐長岡	2.0	114.1		｜	Nankoku	Kōchi
D40	Gomen	後免	2.1	116.2	Tosa Kuroshio Railway Gomen-Nahari Line (some trains through to Kōchi; GN40)	◇	Nankoku	Kōchi
D41	Tosa-Ōtsu	土佐大津	3.2	119.4		◇	Kōchi	Kōchi
D42	Nunoshida▽	布師田	2.0	121.4		｜	Kōchi	Kōchi
D43	Tosa-Ikku	土佐一宮	1.3	122.7		◇	Kōchi	Kōchi
D44	Azōno▽	薊野	1.8	124.5		◇	Kōchi	Kōchi
D45 K00	Kōchi	高知	2.1	126.6	Tosaden Sanbashi Line (Kōchi-Ekimae)	◇	Kōchi	Kōchi
K01	Iriake	入明	1.3	127.9		｜	Kōchi	Kōchi
K02	Engyōjiguchi	円行寺口	0.8	128.7		｜	Kōchi	Kōchi
K03	Asahi	旭	1.5	130.2	Tosaden Ino Line (Asahi-Ekimae-Dōri)	◇	Kōchi	Kōchi
K04	Kōchi-Shōgyō-Mae	高知商業前	1.1	131.3	Tosaden Ino Line (Kagamigawabashi)	｜	Kōchi	Kōchi
K05	Asakura	朝倉	1.4	132.7	Tosaden Ino Line (Asakura-Ekimae)	◇	Kōchi	Kōchi
K06	Edagawa	枝川	3.5	136.2	Tosaden Ino Line (Edagawa)	｜	Ino, Agawa District	Kōchi
K07	Ino	伊野	1.8	138.0	Tosaden Ino Line (Ino-Ekimae)	◇	Ino, Agawa District	Kōchi
K08	Hakawa	波川	1.5	139.5		｜	Ino, Agawa District	Kōchi
K08-1	Omura-Jinja-Mae	小村神社前	2.1	141.6		｜	Hidaka, Takaoka District	Kōchi
K09	Kusaka	日下	2.1	143.7		◇	Hidaka, Takaoka District	Kōchi
K10	Okabana	岡花	2.0	145.7		｜	Hidaka, Takaoka District	Kōchi
K11	Tosa-Kamo	土佐加茂	2.9	148.6		◇	Sakawa, Takaoka District	Kōchi
K12	Nishi-Sakawa	西佐川	3.8	152.4		◇	Sakawa, Takaoka District	Kōchi
K13	Sakawa	佐川	1.8	154.2		◇	Sakawa, Takaoka District	Kōchi
K14	Erinono	襟野々	1.8	156.0		｜	Sakawa, Takaoka District	Kōchi
K15	Togano	斗賀野	2.0	158.0		◇	Sakawa, Takaoka District	Kōchi
K16	Asō	吾桑	5.4	163.4		◇	Susaki	Kōchi
K17	Ōnogō	多ノ郷	2.7	166.1		◇	Susaki	Kōchi
K18	Ōma	大間	0.9	167.0		｜	Susaki	Kōchi
K19	Susaki	須崎	1.7	168.7		◇	Susaki	Kōchi
K20	Tosa-Shinjō	土佐新荘	1.9	170.6		｜	Susaki	Kōchi
K21	Awa	安和	3.0	173.6		｜	Susaki	Kōchi
K22	Tosa-Kure	土佐久礼	6.1	179.7		◇	Nakatosa, Takaoka District	Kōchi
K23	Kageno	影野	10.7	190.4		◇	Shimanto, Takaoka District	Kōchi
K24	Rokutanji	六反地	1.8	192.2		｜	Shimanto, Takaoka District	Kōchi
K25	Niida	仁井田	2.0	194.2		｜	Shimanto, Takaoka District	Kōchi
K26	Kubokawa	窪川	4.5	198.7	Tosa Kuroshio Railway Nakamura Line (TK26) (all JR Shikoku Yodo Line trains run through to Kubokawa)	◇	Shimanto, Takaoka District	Kōchi

== See also ==
- List of railway lines in Japan
