= Kotohira Station =

Railway station in Kotohira, Kagawa Prefecture, Japan

D15 Kotohira Station 琴平駅
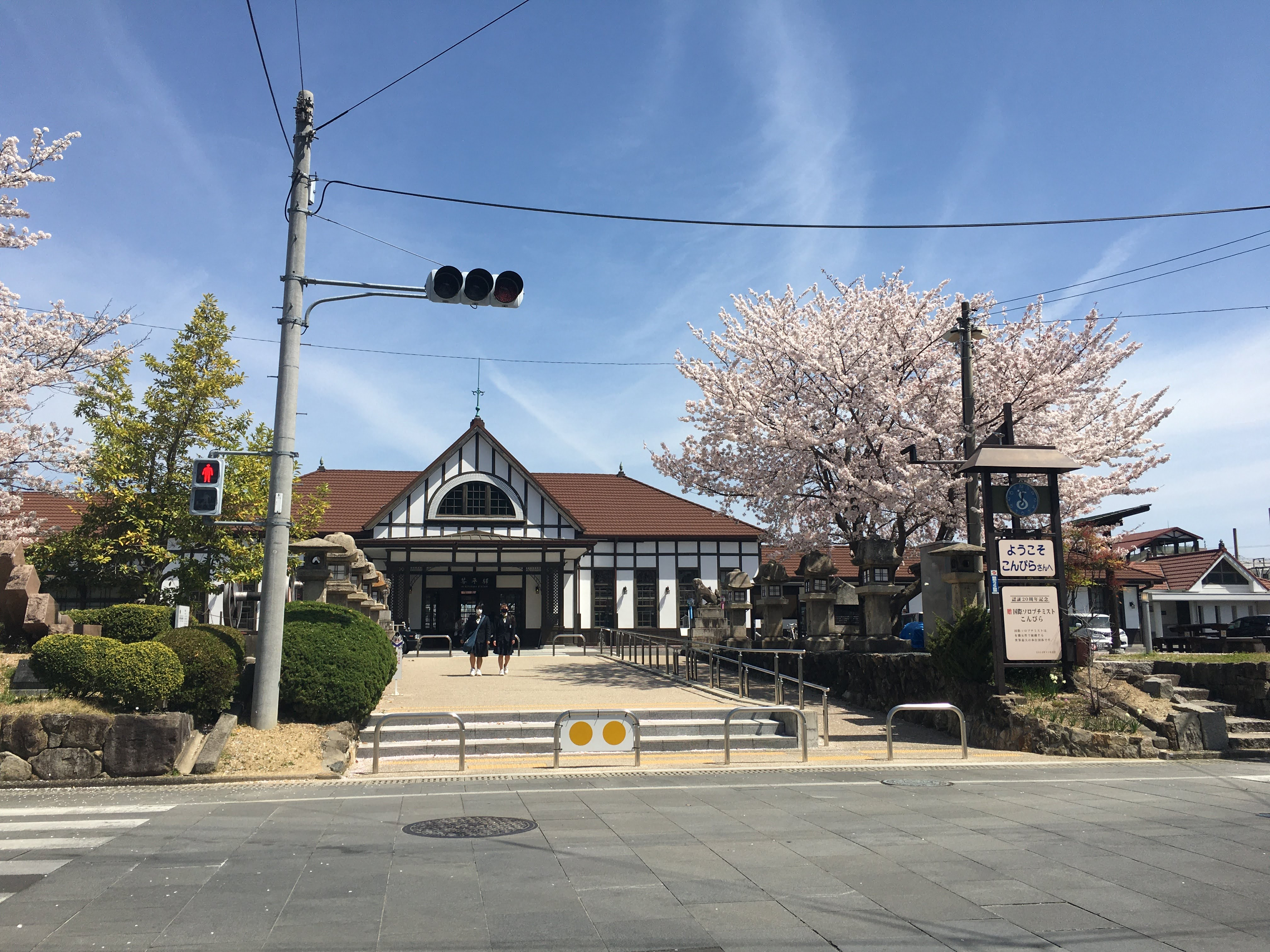
- Kotohira Station, 2021

General information
- Location: 864, Enai Aza-Yokoze, Nakatado-gun, Kotohira-cho, Kagawa-ken; Japan
- Coordinates: 34°11′30.85″N 133°49′16.66″E
- System: JR-Shikoku commuter rail station
- Owner: Shikoku Railway Company
- Operator: Shikoku Railway Company
- Line: ■ Dosan Line
- Distance: 11.3 km (7.0 miles) from Tadotsu; 64.0 km (39.8 miles) from Okayama; 44.0 km (27.3 miles) from Takamatsu
- Platforms: 2 island platforms
- Tracks: 4
- Train operators: Shikoku Railway Company
- Bus stands: yes
- Connections: Kotoden: ■ Kotohira Line (via Kotoden-Kotohira Station)

Construction
- Structure type: At grade
- Parking: yes
- Accessible: None

Other information
- Station code: D15
- Website: Official website

History
- Opened: 23 May 1889
- Electrified: 1987

Passengers
- FY2023: 967 daily

Services
| Preceding station | JR Shikoku | Following station |
■ Dosan Line
| Zentsūji; Toward Tadotsu, Takamatsu | Rapid | Terminus |
| Zentsūji; Toward Tadotsu, Takamatsu and Okayama | Local | Shioiri; Toward Awa-Ikeda, Kōchi and Nakamura |
Location
- Location within Kagawa Prefecture Location within Japan

Kotohira Station (琴平駅, Kotohira-eki) is a passenger railway station located in the town of Kotohira, Nakatado District, Kagawa Prefecture, Japan. It is operated by JR Shikoku and has the station number "D15".

== Lines ==
Kotohira Station is served by the JR Shikoku Dosan Line and is located 11.3 km from the beginning of the line at Tadotsu and 44.0 kilometers from Takamatsu. All regular trains including limited express trains stop here.

== Layout ==
The station consists of two island platforms and four tracks. The station is staffed. This station is the southern end of the ICOCA area of JR Shikoku, and transportation IC cards cannot be used beyond this point. This station is also the end of the electrified section of the Dosan Line.

| 1 | ■ ■ Dosan Line | for Tadotsu, Takamatsu and Okayama |
| 2・3・4 | ■ ■ Dosan Line | for Tadotsu, Takamatsu and Okayama |
| 2・3・4 | ■ ■ Dosan Line | for Awa-Ikeda, Kōchi and Nakamura |

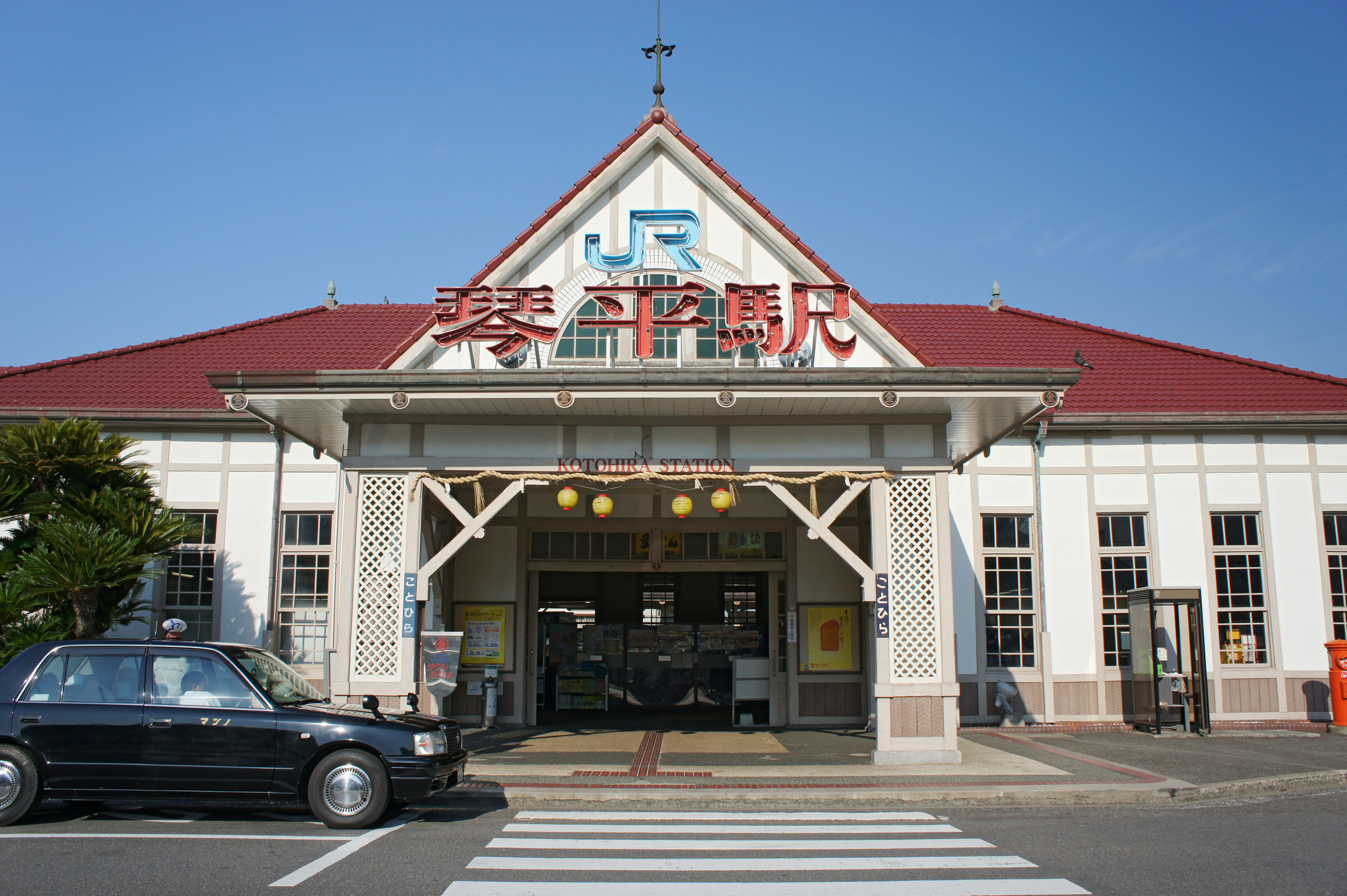
Exterior prior to renovation work

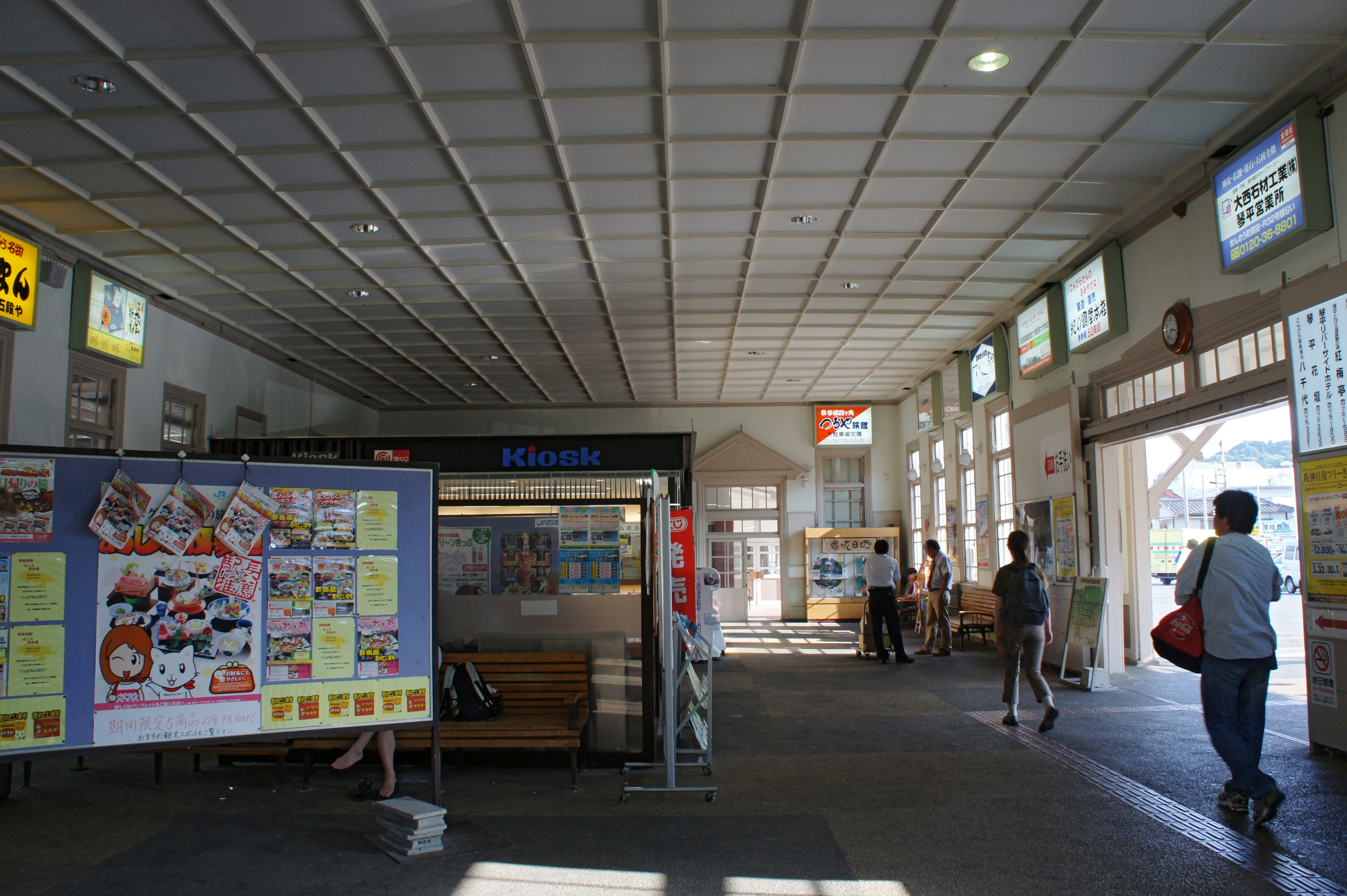
Interior

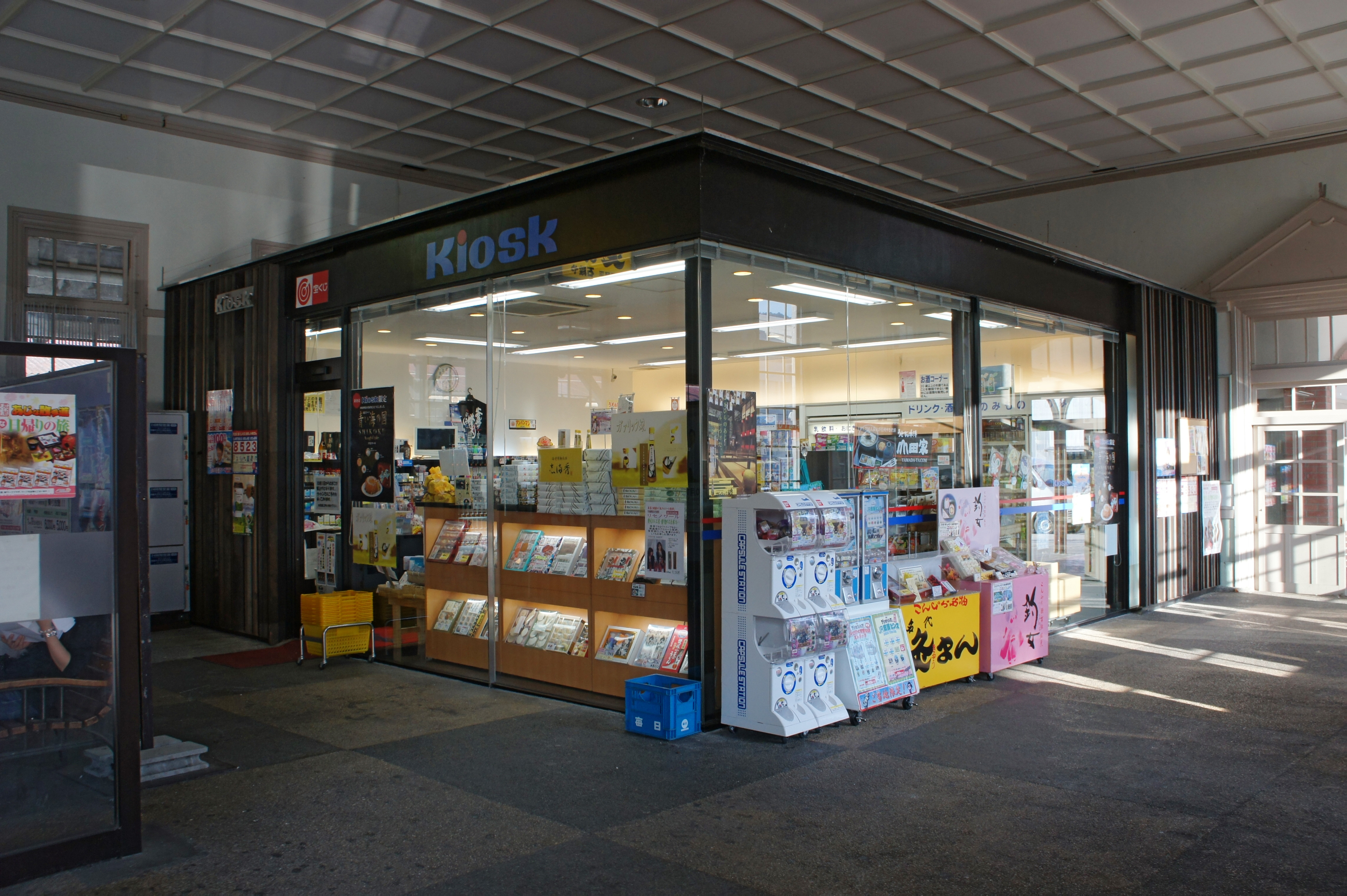
Kiosk

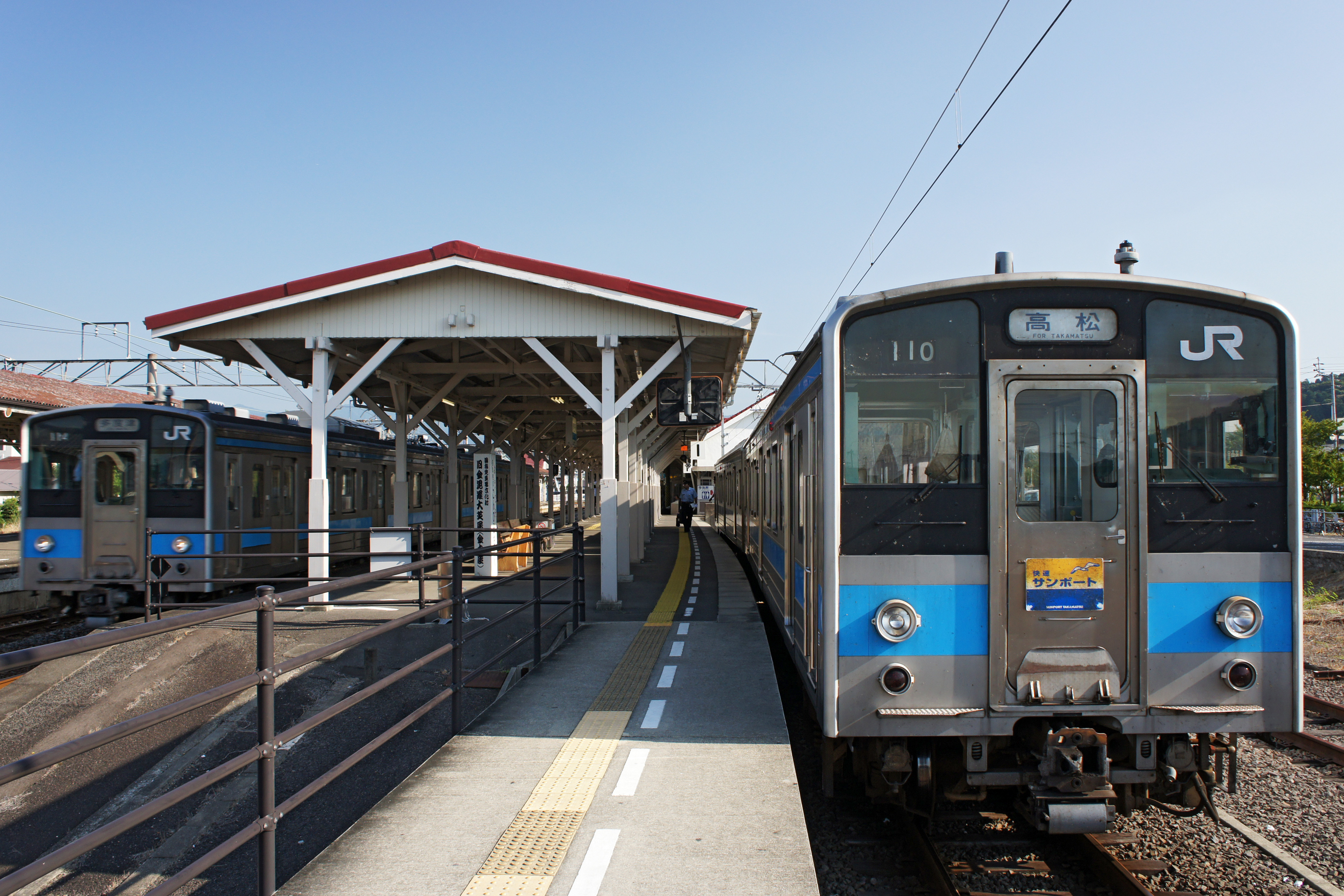
Platform

== Adjacent stations ==
| « | Service | » |
JR Shikoku
Dosan Line
| Zentsūji (D14) | - | Shioiri (D15) |

== History ==
Kotohira Station opened on 23 May 1889 as a station on the Sanuki Railway. The Sanuki Railway was acquired by Sanyo Railway in 1904, and was nationalized in 1906. In November 1922, the station was relocated to its present site, with the former station becoming Kotohira Station of the Kotohira Sangu Electric Railway (later Kotosan Kotohira Station, now Hira Onsen Kotosankaku, also known as a hot spring inn). The current station building was completed in 1936. At that time the station was operated by Japanese Government Railways, later becoming Japanese National Railways (JNR). With the privatization of JNR on 1 April 1987, control of the station passed to JR Shikoku.

== Surrounding area ==
- Kotohira-gū
- Konpira Grand Theatre
- Kotoden-Kotohira Station

== See also ==
- List of railway stations in Japan
