= Tadotsu Station =

Railway station in Tadotsu, Kagawa Prefecture, Japan

Y12 D12 Tadotsu Station 多度津駅
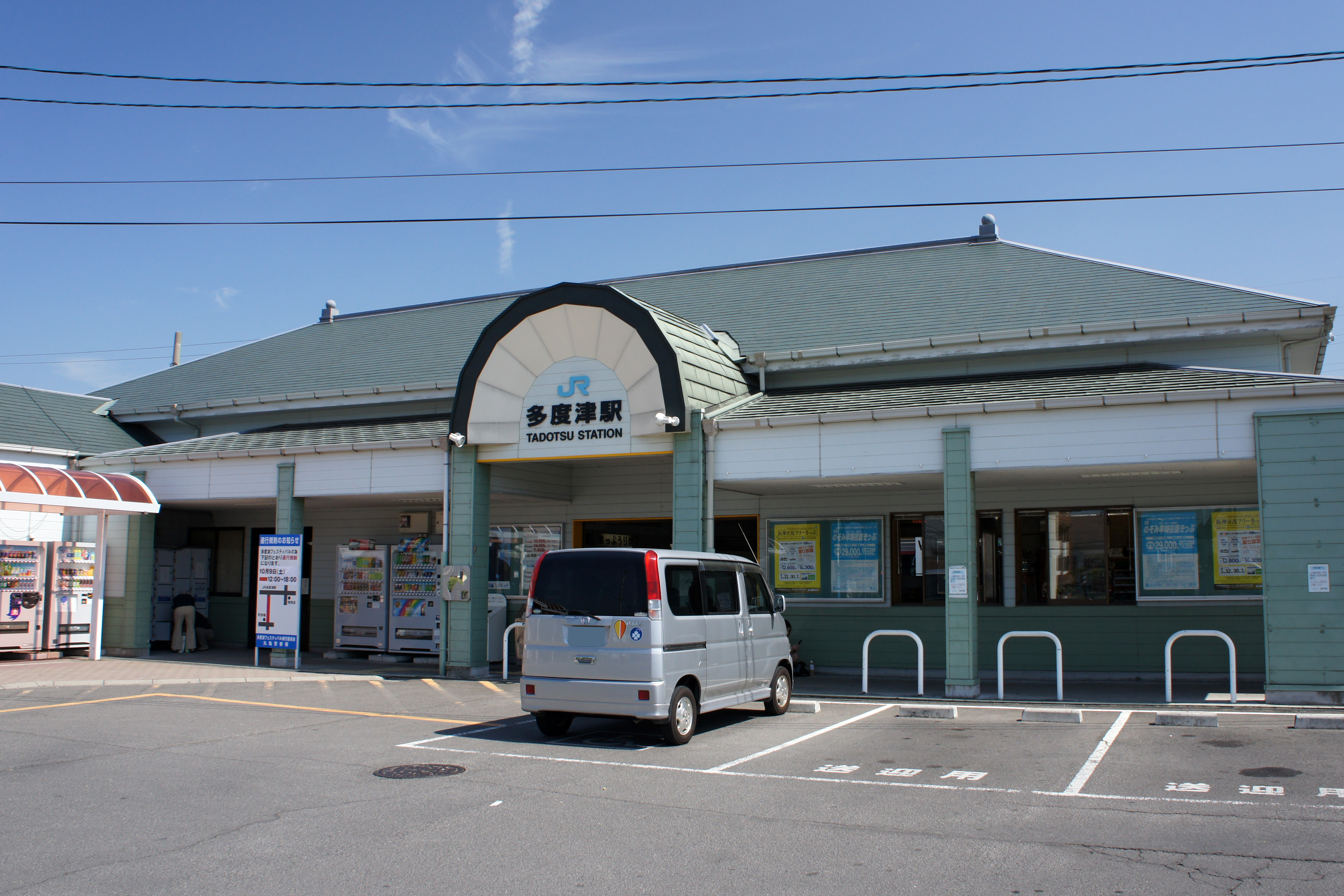
- Tadotsu Station in 2010

General information
- Location: 3-3-1 Sakae-cho, Tadotsu-cho, Nakatado-gun, Kagawa-ken 764-0011; Japan
- Coordinates: 34°16′15.92″N 133°45′24.25″E
- Operator: JR Shikoku; JR Freight
- Lines: Yosan Line; Dosan Line
- Distance: 32.7 km (20.3 mi) from Takamatsu
- Platforms: 2 island platforms
- Tracks: 4

Construction
- Structure type: At grade
- Cycle facilities: Bike shed
- Accessible: No

Other information
- Status: Staffed (Midori no Madoguchi)
- Station code: Y12 (Yosan line); D12 (Dosan line)
- Website: Official website

History
- Opened: 23 May 1889; 137 years ago

Passengers
- FY2023: 1916

Services
Preceding station	JR Shikoku	Following station
Kaiganji Y13 towards Uwajima	Yosan Line	Sanuki-Shioya Y11 towards Takamatsu
Konzōji D13 towards Kubokawa	Dosan Line	through to Yosan Line
Location
- Location within Kagawa Prefecture Location within Japan

Tadotsu Station (多度津駅, Tadotsu-eki) is a junction passenger railway station located in the town of Tadotsu, Nakatado District, Kagawa Prefecture, Japan. It is operated by JR Shikoku. The station is also a freight depot for the Japan Freight Railway Company (JR Freight).

== Lines ==
Tadotsu Station is station "Y12" JR Shikoku Yosan Line and is located 32.7 km from the beginning of the line at Takamatsu. Yosan line local, Rapid Sunport, and Nanpū Relay services stop at the station. It is also station "D12" for the Dosan Line of which it is also the terminal station and is 126.6 kilometers from the opposing terminal at Kōchi Station.

== Layout ==
The station consists of two island platforms connected by an underground passage, serving four tracks. The station building has a Midori no Madoguchi staffed ticket office. Despite a relatively large number of passengers each day, the station has no barrier-free facilities, and wheelchair users must access the platforms by a staff-only passage on the premises with a station attendant. A JGR Class 8620 steam locomotive is on display outside the station.

== History ==
Tadotsu Station was opened on May 23, 1889 as a station on the Sanuki Railway Line between Marugame and Kotohira. Sanyo Railway joined to this stationing 1903 and Sanuki Railway was acquired by Sanyo Railway on December 1, 1904, and was subsequently nationalized on December 1, 1906. The station was relocated to its current site on December 20, 1913 to eliminate a switchback, and the old location became a freight depot. With the privatization of JNR on April 1, 1987, control of the station passed to JR Shikoku.

== Surrounding area ==
- Tadotsu Town Office
- Shorinji Kempo Sohonzan
- Tadotsu Port
- Shikoku Railway Tadotsu Factory

== See also ==
- List of railway stations in Japan
