= Shikoku Tosa Toki no Yoake no Monogatari =

Japanese limited express train service

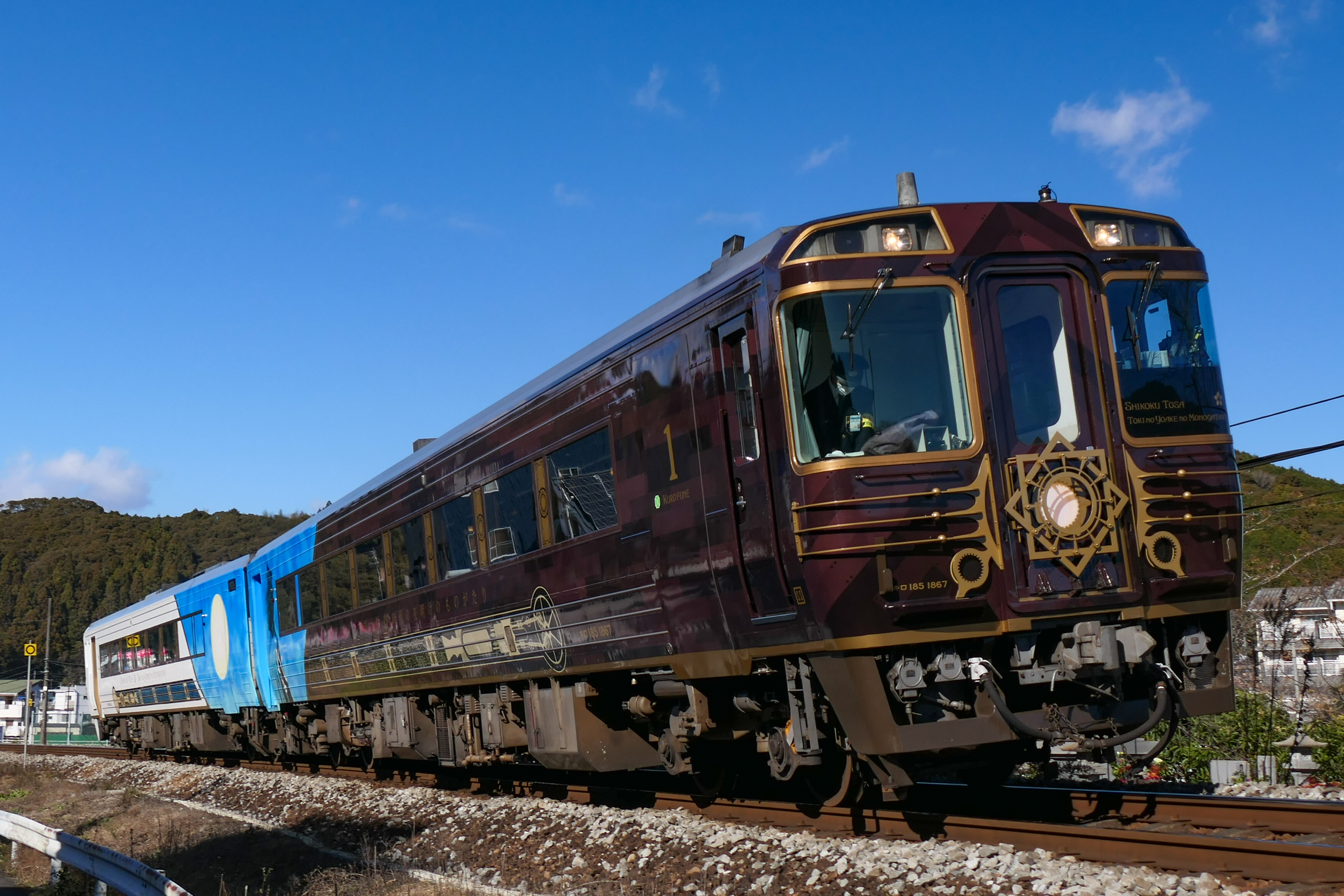
- The service traveling between Sakawa Station and Erinono Station

Overview
- Service type: Limited express
- Status: Operational
- Locale: Shikoku, Japan
- First service: 4 July 2020
- Current operator: JR Shikoku

Route
- Termini: Kōchi; Kubokawa
- Stops: 3
- Distance travelled: 72.1 km
- Line used: Dosan Line

Technical
- Rolling stock: KiHa 185 series DMU
- Track gauge: 1,067 mm (3 ft 6 in)
- Electrification: Non-electrified

The Shikoku Tosa Toki no Yoake no Monogatari (志国土佐 時代の夜明けのものがたり, Shikoku Tosa Toki no Yoake no Monogatari) is a limited express sightseeing train service operated by JR Shikoku in Shikoku, Japan, since July 2020.

== Overview ==
The Shikoku Tosa Toki no Yoake no Monogatari is the third sightseeing train service in the Monogatari series introduced by JR Shikoku, after the Iyonada Monogatari and the Shikoku Mannaka Sennen Monogatari. Originally scheduled to start operations on April 18, 2020, its launch was delayed to July 4, 2020, due to the COVID-19 pandemic.

The train runs between Kōchi and Kubokawa in Kōchi Prefecture, offering views of Kōchi's natural landscapes. Its theming concept is based on the historical exploits and aspirations of important figures of the Bakumatsu and Meiji Restoration, particularly that of native sons such as Sakamoto Ryōma and Nakaoka Shintarō. The name of the train means "Tale of the Dawn of an Era".

== Operation status ==
The train service operates on Fridays, weekends, and holidays between Kōchi and Kubokawa, running one round trip per day. Meals created with local ingredients are served on every route. The service out of Kōchi is named Excerpts of Aspirations (立志の抄, Risshi no shō), while the service out of Kubokawa is named Excerpts of Blossoming Flowers (開花の抄, Kaika no shō).

Both services stop at the stations of Kōchi, Tosa-Kure, and Kubokawa. Additional stops include:

Kōchi to Kubokawa (Noon service)

- Asakura, Ino, Kusaka, Nishi-Sakawa, Susaki, Awa, Kageno

Kubokawa to Kōchi (Afternoon service)

- Awa, Susaki, Sakawa, Nishi-Sakawa, Ino, Asakura, Asahi

A special service pattern also runs between Kōchi and Nahari, using tracks of the Tosa Kuroshio Railway Asa Line (also known as the Gomen-Nahari Line). Originally a limited-time run for group tours between in 2021, the service became permanent afterwards, running every year on Fridays from October to December. For this pattern, the service out of Kōchi is named Excerpts of the Sparkling Sea (煌海の抄, Kirameki no shō), while the service out of Nahari is named Excerpts of Heroic Flights (雄飛の抄, Yuuhi no shō). Both services stop at the stations of Kōchi, Yasu, Aki, and Nahari.

== Rolling stock ==
The Shikoku Tosa Toki no Yoake no Monogatari uses a 2-car KiHa 185 series DMU for its services. The first car, painted black, is nicknamed KUROFUNE ("black ship"), while the second car, painted white, is nicknamed SORAFUNE ("sky ship"). An image of Sakamoto Ryōma is painted on the exterior of the train, along with images of the sun and the moon.

The interior of KUROFUNE is themed around late 19th century steamships, evoking the Black Ships that brought Japan out from isolation; the interior of SORAFUNE, by contrast, is themed with futuristic sci-fi elements of skyships and stars, signifying dreams for the future.

== Gallery ==
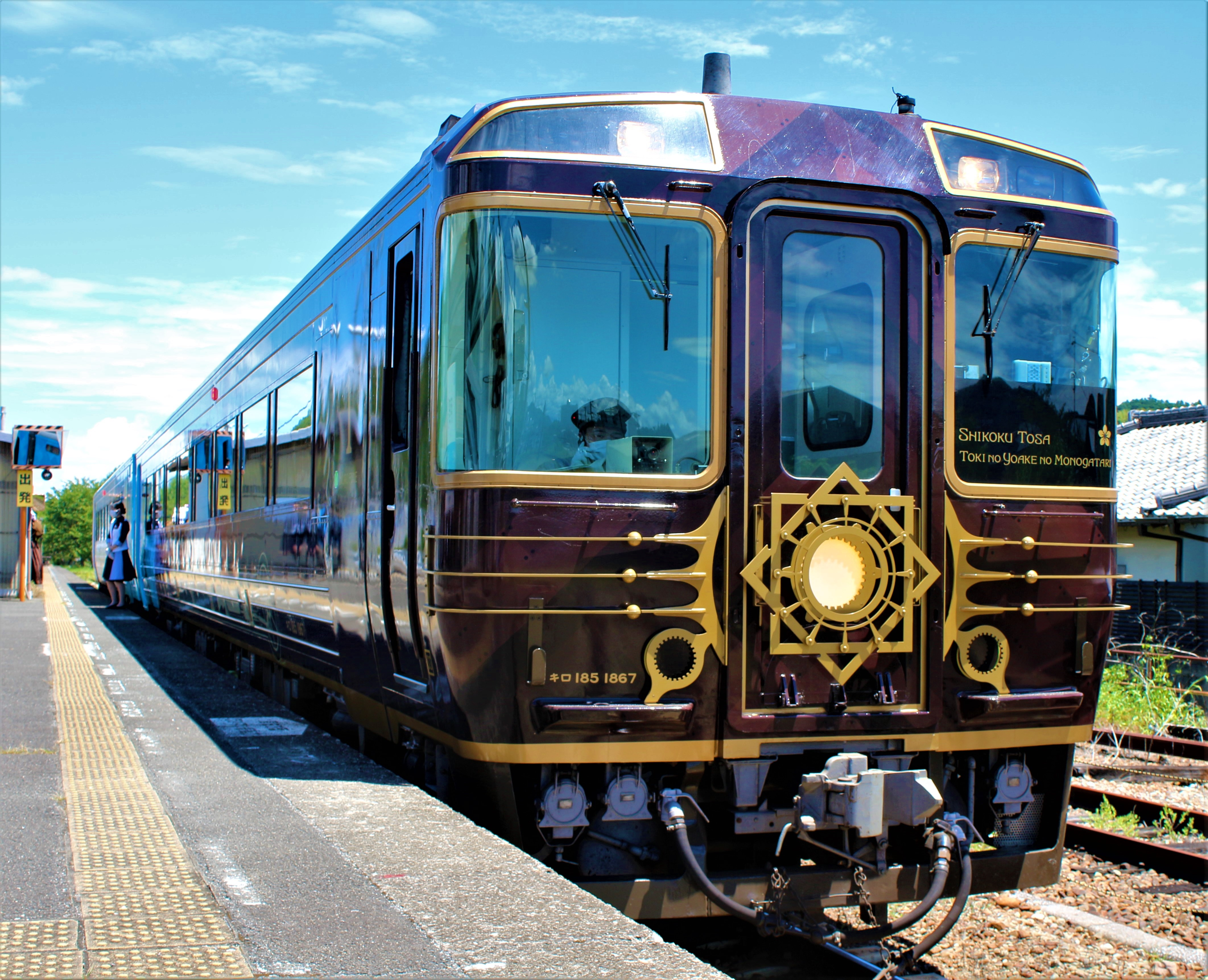
KUROFUNE at Ino Station

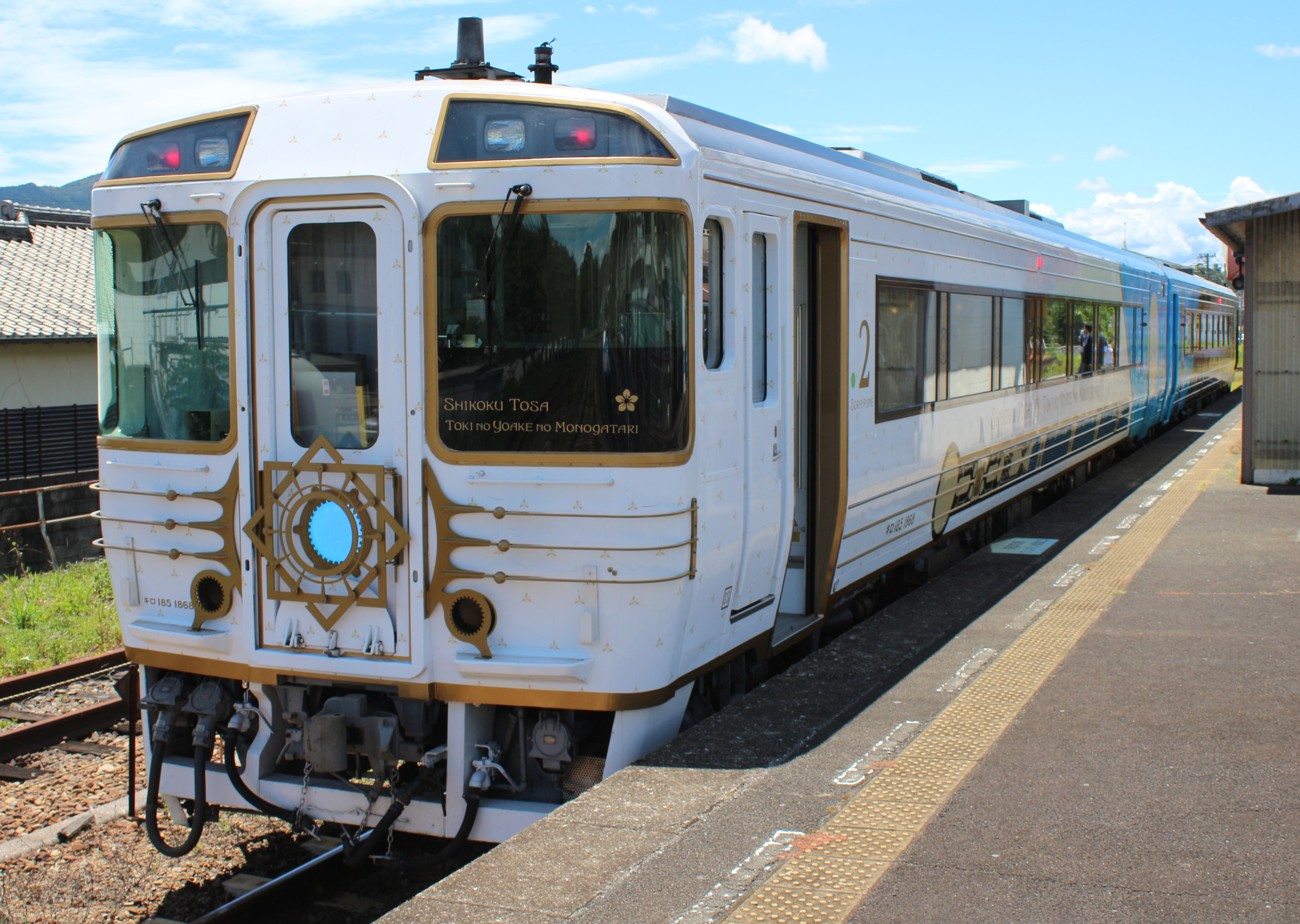
SORAFUNE at Ino Station
