= Tsuno, Kōchi =

Tsuno 津野町
- Town
- Tsuno town hall

- Flag Chapter
- Location of Tsuno in Kōchi Prefecture

- Location in Japan
- Coordinates: 33°27′N 133°12′E
- Country: Japan
- Region: Shikoku
- Prefecture: Kōchi
- District: Takaoka

Area
  - Total: 197.85 km^{2} (76.39 sq mi)

Population (August 1, 2022)
  - Total: 5,127
  - Density: 25.91/km^{2} (67.12/sq mi)
- Time zone: UTC+09:00 (JST)
- City hall address: 471-1 Nagano, Tsuno-chō, Takaoka-gun, Kōchi-ken 785-0201
- Website: Official website
- Symbols
- Bird: Varied tit
- Flower: Rhododendron
- Tree: Hinoki

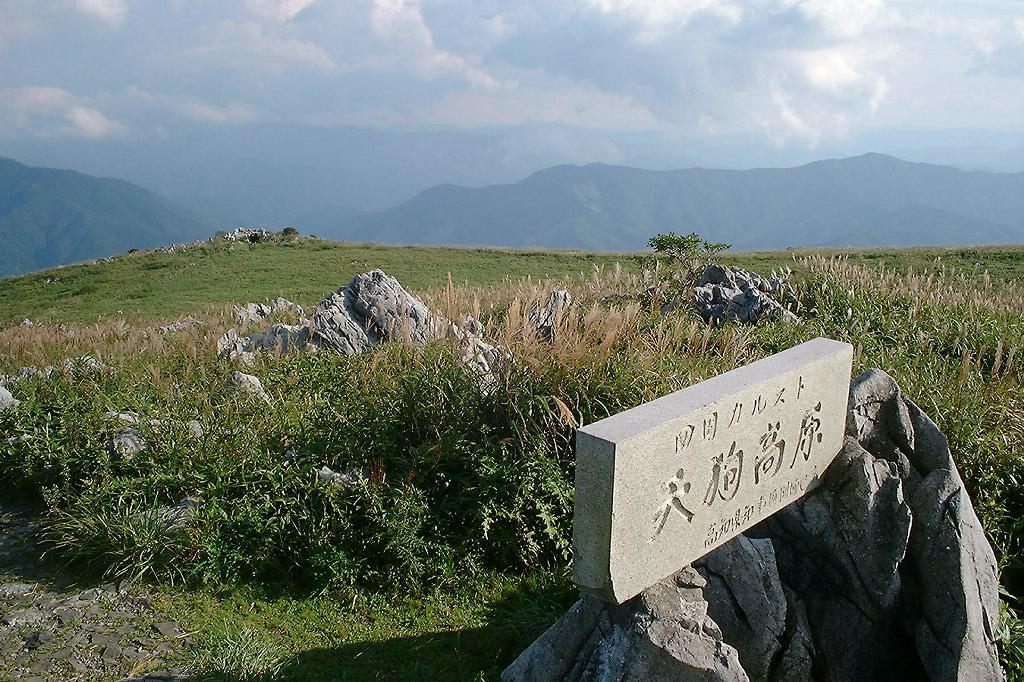
Shikoku karst landscape

Tsuno (津野町, Tsuno-chō) is a town located in Takaoka District, Kōchi Prefecture, Japan. As of 1 August 2022, the town had an estimated population of 5,127 and a population density of 26 persons per km^{2}.The total area of the town is 197.85 square kilometres (76.39 sq mi).

== Geography ==
Tsuno is located in the mid-western part of Kochi Prefecture on the island of Shikoku. The town is surrounded by the Shikoku Mountains and the landscape is steep, with about 90% occupied by forests, and the area ratio of agricultural land and residential land is low. In the Hayama area, the Shinjo River runs east and west in the central area, and in the Higashitsuno area are the headlands of the Shimanto River.

=== Neighbouring municipalities ===
Ehime Prefecture

- Kumakōgen

Kōchi Prefecture

- Niyodogawa
- Ochi
- Sakawa
- Shimanto Town
- Susaki
- Tosa
- Yusuhara

=== Climate ===
Tsuno has a humid subtropical climate (Köppen Cfa) characterized by warm summers and cool winters with light snowfall. The average annual temperature in Tsuno is 12.8 °C. The average annual rainfall is 2375 mm with September as the wettest month. The temperatures are highest on average in January, at around 23.4 °C, and lowest in January, at around 1.9 °C.

== Demographics ==
Per Japanese census data, the population of Tsuno peaked around the year 1950 and has declined by roughly two-thirds in the decades since.

Historical population
Year	Pop.	±%
1920	13,437	—
1930	13,296	−1.0%
1940	12,721	−4.3%
1950	15,371	+20.8%
1960	13,249	−13.8%
1970	9,629	−27.3%
1980	8,712	−9.5%
1990	8,000	−8.2%
2000	7,258	−9.3%
2010	6,407	−11.7%
2020	5,291	−17.4%

== History ==
As with all of Kōchi Prefecture, the area of Tsuno was part of ancient Tosa Province. During the Edo period, the area was part of the holdings of Tosa Domain ruled by the Yamauchi clan from their seat at Kōchi Castle. The villages of Kamihayama (上半山村), Shimohayama (下半山村) and Higashitsuno (東津野村) ere established with the creation of the modern municipalities system on October 1, 1889. Kamihayama and Shimohayama merged to form the village of Hayama on September 30, 1956. Hayama and Higahshi-Tsuno merged to form the town of Tsuno on February 1, 2005.

== Government ==
Tsuno has a mayor-council form of government with a directly elected mayor and a unicameral village council of ten members. Tsuno, together with the municipalities of Nakatosa, Yusuhara, and Shimanto, contributes two members to the Kōchi Prefectural Assembly. In terms of national politics, the town is part of Kōchi 2nd district of the lower house of the Diet of Japan.

== Economy ==
Tsuno's economy is based on agriculture (notable rice and green tea) and forestry.

== Education ==
Tsuno has three public elementary schools and two public middle schools operated by the town government. The town does not have a high school.

== Transportation ==
=== Railway ===
Tsuno has no passenger railway service. The nearest train stations as Susaki Station and Tosa-Shinjō Station on the JR Shikoku Dosan Line.

=== Highways ===
- National Route 197
- National Route 494
