= Togano Station =

Railway station in Sakawa, Kōchi Prefecture, Japan

Togano Station 斗賀野駅
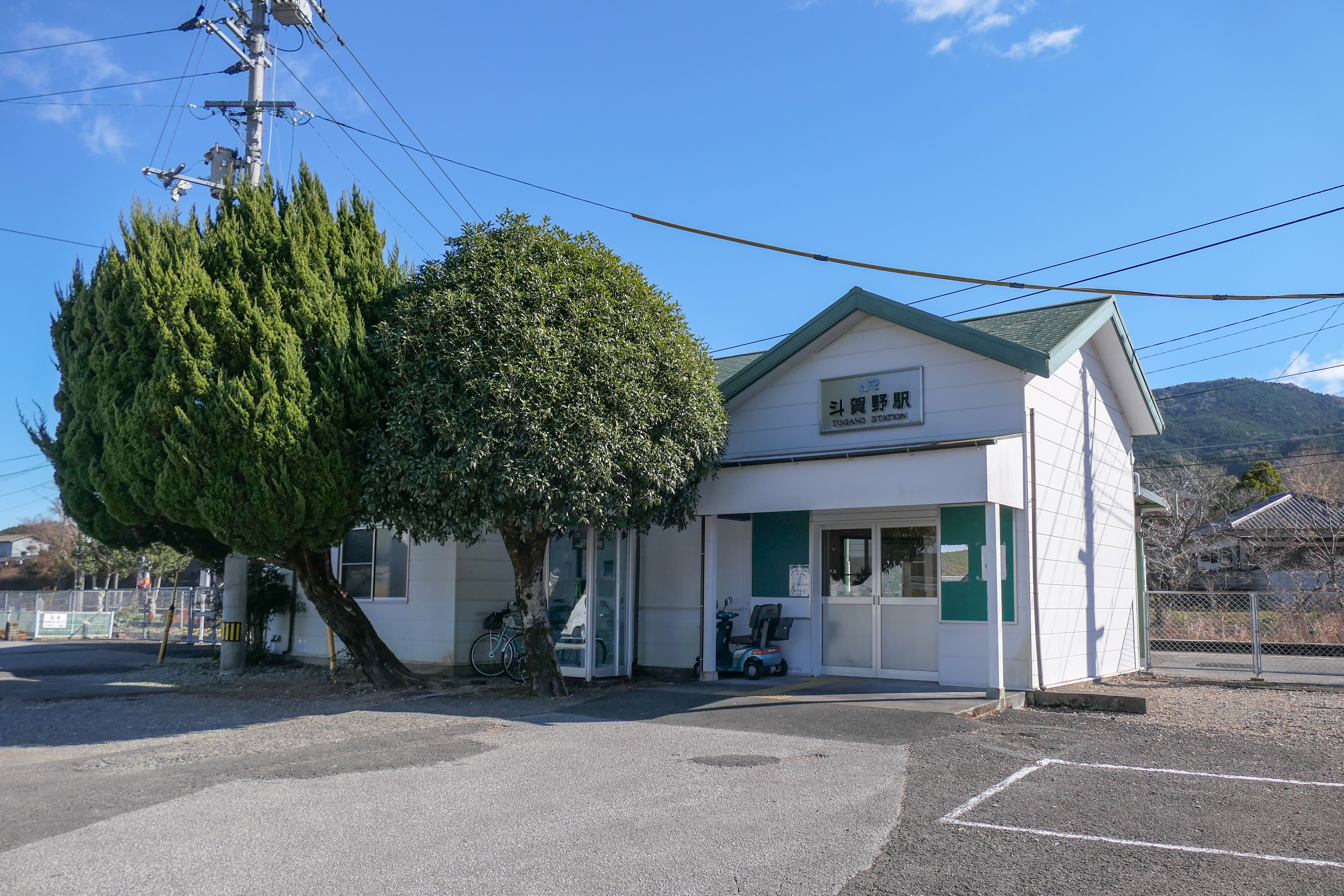
- Togano Station in 2021

General information
- Location: Higashigumi, Sakawa, Takaoka-gun, Kōchi-ken 789-1232; Japan
- Coordinates: 33°28′31″N 133°17′12″E
- Operator: JR Shikoku
- Line: ■ Dosan Line
- Distance: 158.0 km from Tadotsu
- Platforms: 2 side platforms
- Tracks: 2 + 1 siding

Construction
- Parking: Available
- Accessible: Yes - platforms linked by ramps and a level crossing

Other information
- Status: Unstaffed
- Station code: K15

History
- Opened: 30 March 1924

Passengers
- FY2019: 278
Location
- Location within Kochi Prefecture Location within Japan

Togano Station (斗賀野駅, Togano-eki) is a passenger railway station located in the town of Sakawa, Takaoka District, Kōchi Prefecture, Japan. It is operated by JR Shikoku and has the station number "K15".

== Lines ==
The station is served by JR Shikoku's Dosan Line and is located 158.0 km from the beginning of the line at Tadotsu.

== Layout ==
The station, which is unstaffed, consists of two opposed side platforms serving a two tracks. A station building linked to platform 1 serves as a waiting room. Access to platform 2 across the tracks is by means of ramps and a level crossing. A siding runs along part of the other side of platform 2.

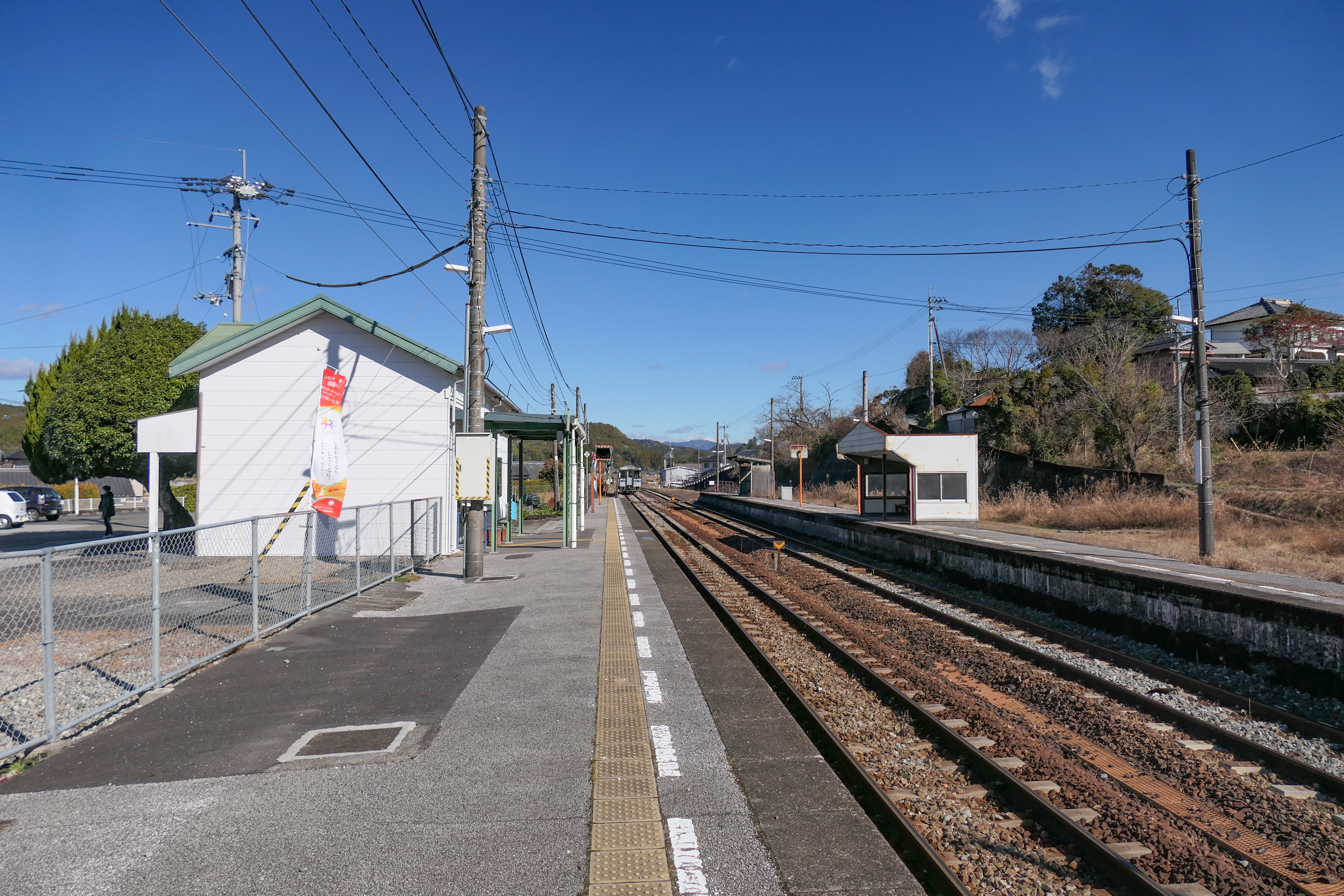
View of the station platforms in 2021

== Adjacent stations ==
«	Service	»
Dosan Line
Erinono	Local	Asō

== History ==
The station opened on 30 March 1924 when the then Kōchi Line (later renamed the Dosan Line) was constructed from Susaki to Kusaka. At this time the station was operated by Japanese Government Railways, later becoming Japanese National Railways (JNR). With the privatization of JNR on 1 April 1987, control of the station passed to JR Shikoku and JR Freight. Freight operations ceased on 1 October 1992.

== Surrounding area ==
- Japan National Route 494
- Sagawa Municipal Togano Elementary School

== See also ==
- List of railway stations in Japan
