= Fudō-ga-Iwaya Cave =

Archaeological site in Japan

- 不動ガ岩屋洞窟 (Japanese)
- Fudō-ga-Iwaya Cave Fudō-ga-Iwaya Cave (Japan)
- 33°29′02″N 133°21′15″E
- Type: settlement
- Periods: Jōmon period
- Location: Sakawa, Kōchi, Japan
- Region: Shikoku

Site notes
- Public access: Yes (no public facilities)
- National Historic Site of Japan

Fudō-ga-Iwaya Cave (不動ガ岩屋洞窟, Fudō-ga-Iwaya dōkutsu) is an archaeological site consisting of a Jōmon period cave dwelling in the Nishiyama-gumi neighborhood of the town of Sakawa, Kōchi Prefecture on the island of Shikoku Japan. The site was designated a National Historic Site of Japan in 1978.

== Overview ==
The cave is located halfway up a hill in the Sakawa Basin in the middle basin of the Niyodo River. It is an inverted U-shaped limestone cave with an opening four meters wide and six meters high facing south. The first chamber extends for eight meters, and a four-meter wide opening on a side wall leads to a second chamber with height of two meters and depth of eight meters. It was named for a statue of Fudō Myōō that was enshrined in the first chamber. Archaeological excavations conducted from 164 found Jōmon pottery with pressed ridge patterns, stone axes and stone arrowheads from the early Jōmon period.

The site is about 20 minutes by car from Sakawa Station on the JR Shikoku Dosan Line; however, there are no facilities at site.

== See also ==
- List of Historic Sites of Japan (Kōchi)
- Kosegasawa Cave
