= Niida Station =

Niida Station is the name of two train stations in Japan:

- Niida Station (Fukushima) (二井田駅)
- Niida Station (Kochi) (仁井田駅)
