= Sakawa, Kōchi =

Sakawa 佐川町
- Town
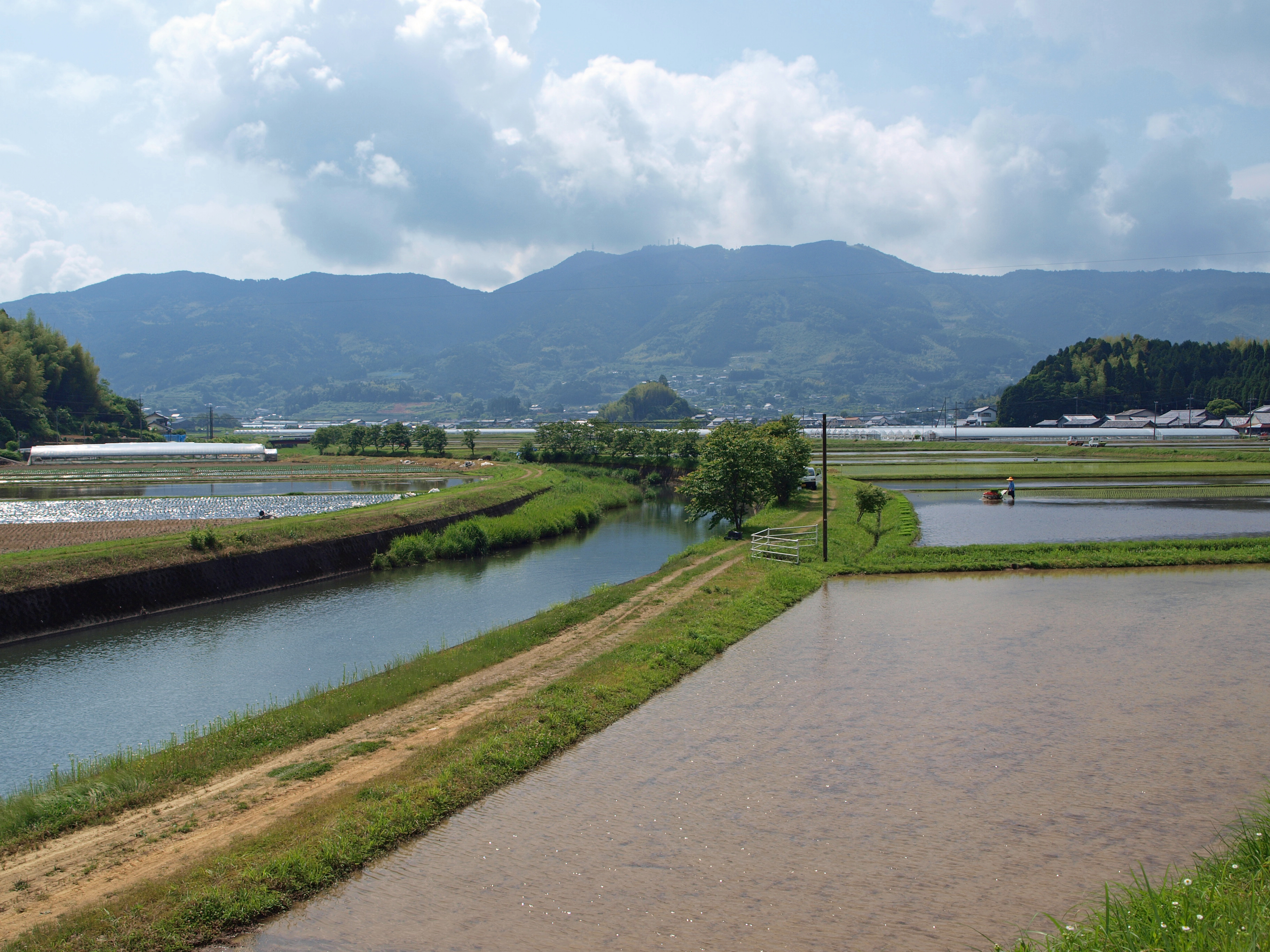
- View of Sakawa Town and Mount Kokuzo

- Flag Emblem
- Location of Sakawa in Kōchi Prefecture

- Location in Japan
- Coordinates: 33°30′N 133°17′E
- Country: Japan
- Region: Shikoku
- Prefecture: Kōchi
- District: Takaoka

Government
  - Mayor: Kazumichi Horimi

Area
  - Total: 100.8 km^{2} (38.9 sq mi)

Population (August 1, 2022)
  - Total: 12,306
  - Density: 122.1/km^{2} (316.2/sq mi)
- Time zone: UTC+09:00 (JST)
- City hall address: 1650-2 Kou, Sagawa-cho, Takaoka-gun, Kochi-ken 789-1292
- Website: Official website
- Symbols
- Bird: Kingfisher
- Flower: Asarum sakawanaum
- Tree: Sakura

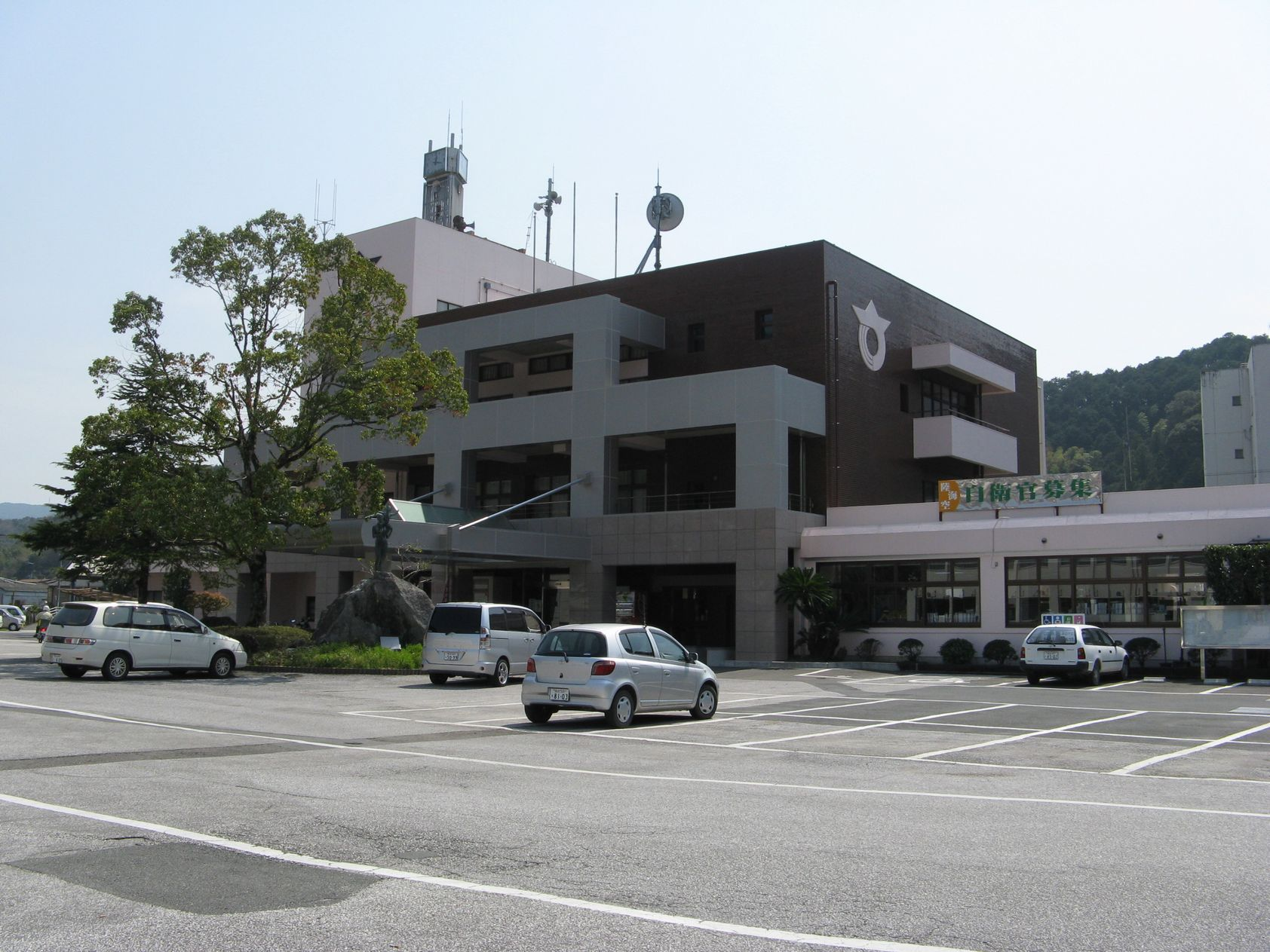
Sakawa Town Office

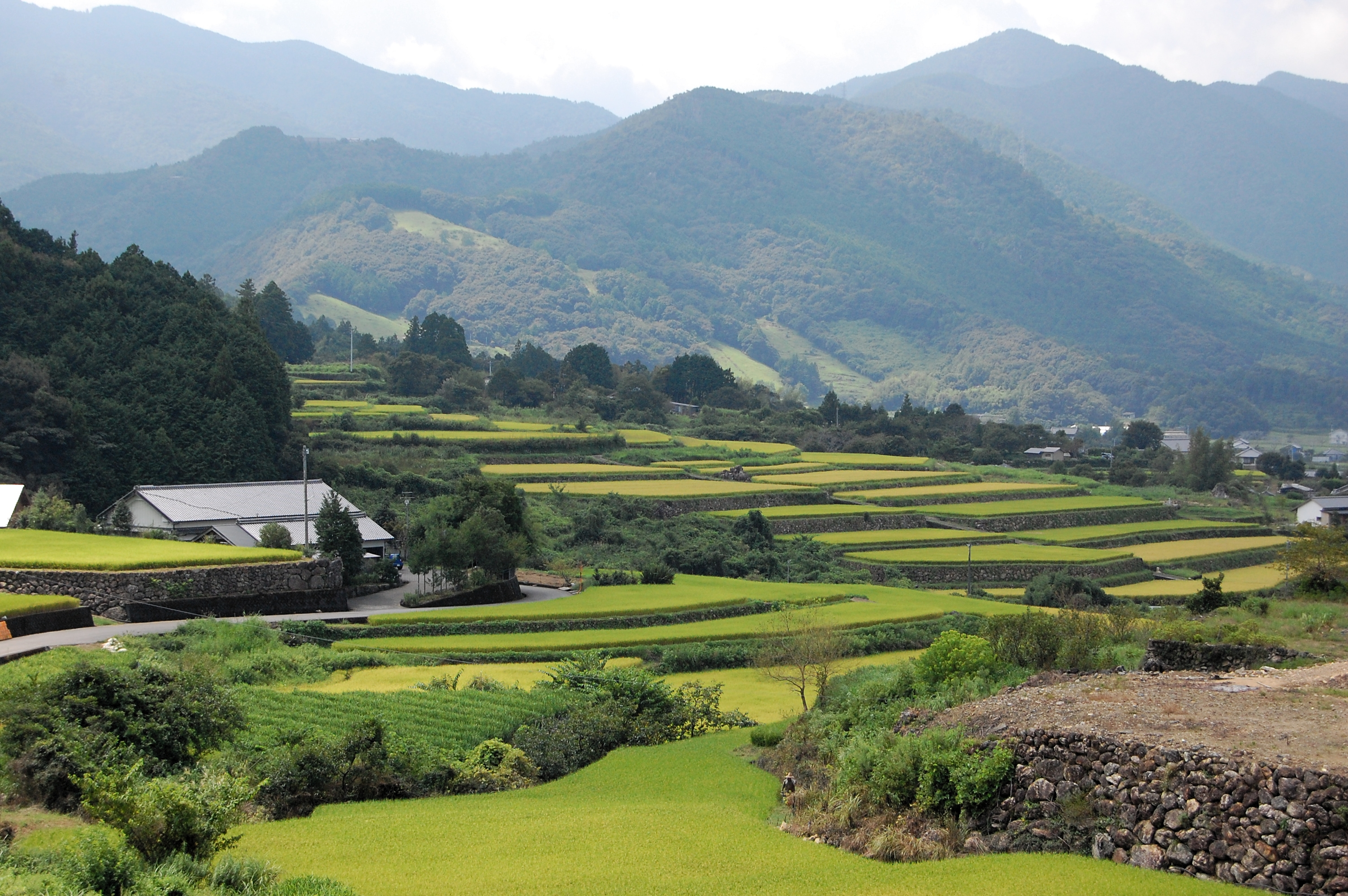
Rice terraces in Sakawa

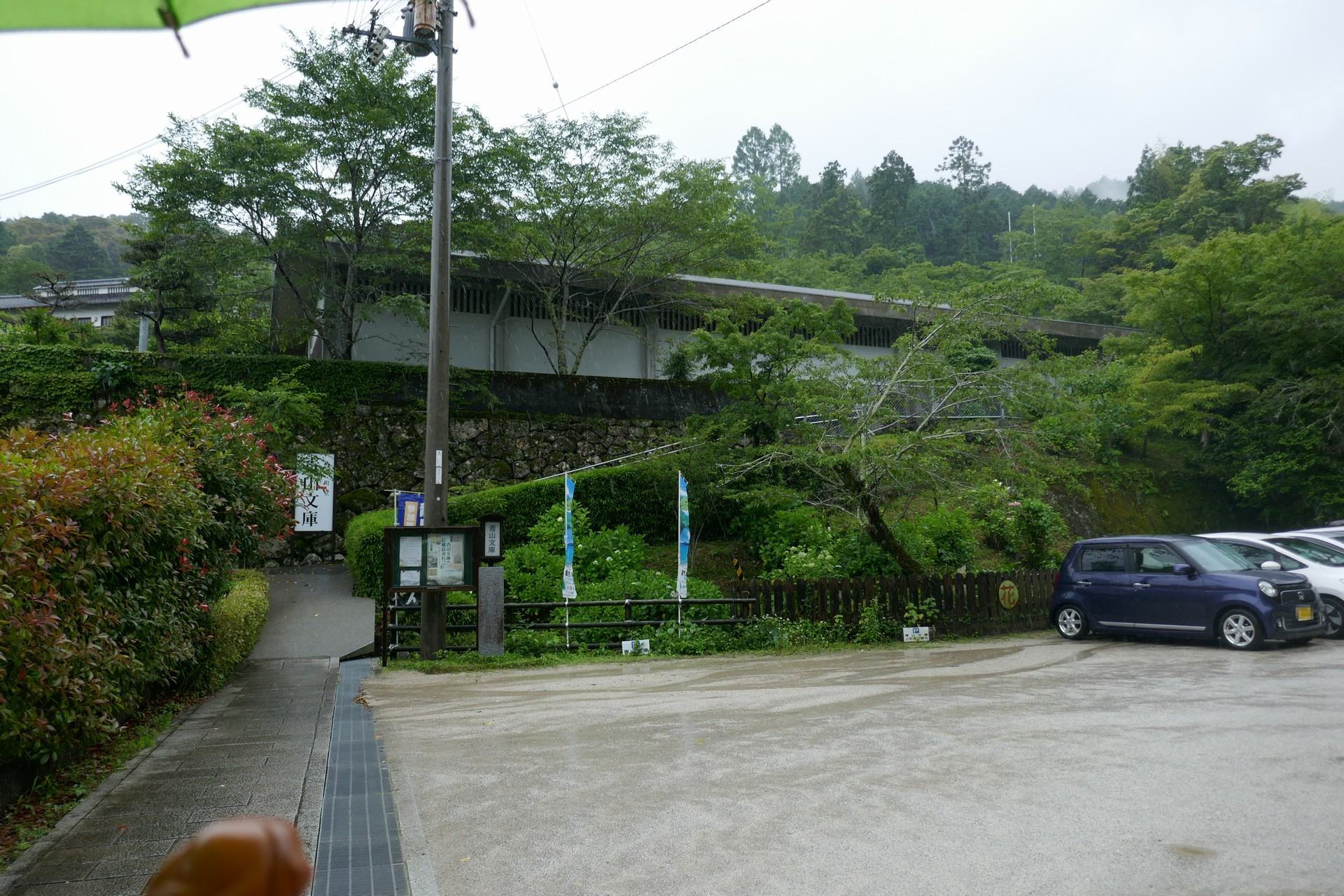
Seizan Bunko

Sakawa (佐川町, Sakawa-chō) is a town located in Takaoka District, Kōchi Prefecture, Japan. As of 1 August 2022, the town had an estimated population of 12,306 in 6036 households and a population density of 120 persons per km^{2}. The total area of the town is 100.8 square kilometres (38.9 sq mi).

== Geography ==
Sakawa is located in a basin along the Yanase River, a tributary of the Niyodo River, in the midwestern part of Kochi Prefecture on the island of Shikoku. The landscape is hilly and the roads and footpaths are winding and narrow. The town is 28 km (17 mi) west of Kōchi City. The tallest mountain in Sakawa is Mt. Kokuzo, with an elevation of 675 m (2,215 ft). Many rivers also run through the town, which are tributaries of the Niyodo River.

=== Neighbouring municipalities ===
Kōchi Prefecture

- Hidaka
- Ino
- Susaki
- Tosa
- Tsuno

=== Climate ===
Sakawa has a humid subtropical climate (Köppen Cfa) characterized by warm summers and cool winters with light snowfall. The average annual temperature in Sakawa is 15.3 °C (59.5 °F). The average annual rainfall is 2,688 mm (105.8 in) with September as the wettest month. The temperatures are highest on average in August, at around 25.6 °C (78.1 °F), and lowest in January, at around 5.0 °C (41.0 °F). Sakawa experiences extreme seasons. Spring and Fall are mild and cool. Summer is very warm and temperatures routinely reach 35 °C (95 °F) with 100% humidity. The coldest months are January and February with temperatures around 10 °C (50 °F) during the day. There are usually one or two light snowfalls in January. The rainy season is from June to August and typhoons are common during this time.

== Demographics ==
Per Japanese census data, the population of Sakawa has been decreasing slowly since the 1980s.

Historical population
Year	Pop.	±%
1960	16,964	—
1970	15,774	−7.0%
1980	16,114	+2.2%
1990	15,636	−3.0%
2000	14,777	−5.5%
2010	13,951	−5.6%
2020	12,323	−11.7%

== History ==
As with all of Kōchi Prefecture, the area of Sakawa was part of ancient Tosa Province. Relics from the Japanese Paleolithic. Since then, Sakawa has been named "Mecca of geology in Japan" because "some of the world's rarest and most precious fossils have been unearthed" in Sakawa. through Jomon and Yayoi periods have been found in the town. During the Edo period, the area was part of the holdings of Tosa Domain ruled by the Yamauchi clan from their seat at Kōchi Castle. The village of Sakawa was established with the creation of the modern municipalities system on October 1, 1889. It was promoted to town status on January 10, 1900.

== Government ==
Sakawa has a mayor-council form of government with a directly elected mayor and a unicameral village council of 14 members. Sakawa, together with the municipalities of Hidaka and Ochi, contributes one member to the Kōchi Prefectural Assembly. In terms of national politics, the town is part of Kōchi 2nd district of the lower house of the Diet of Japan.

== Economy ==
Sakawa's economy is centered on agriculture, notably growing rice, Japanese pears, tea leaves, soybeans, strawberries, and many other crops. Sakawa is famous for the production of Tsukasabotan, a type of sake. There is a brewery in town that offers free tours and samples. Traditionally, the town is also home to artisans who produce hand-made earthenware and woven bamboo products.

== Education ==
Sakawa has four public elementary schools and three public middle schools operated by the town government, and one public high school operated by the Kōchi Prefecture Board of Education. There are also one middle school and one high school operated jointly with neighboring Hidaka Village.

== Transportation ==
=== Railway ===
Shikoku Railway Company - Dosan Line

- Tosa-Kamo - Nishi-Sakawa - Sakawa - Erinono - Togano

=== Highways ===
- National Route 33
- National Route 494

== Local attractions ==
- Old Seizan Library, the only Western-style wooden structure still standing in Kōchi Prefecture. Although no longer in use as a library (a new building houses all the historical texts), the house remains open as a small museum and historical site.
- Fudō-ga-Iwaya Cave, National Historic Site

== Notable people from Sakawa ==
- Masako Bandō, Japanese novelist
- Ono Daisuke, voice actor
- Tomitaro Makino, Father of Japanese Botany
- Hiroshi Takahashi, Japanese architect
- Satoshi Yamaguchi, Japanese football player
- Keiji Yoshimura, Japanese former football player and younger brother of Koji Yoshimura
- Koji Yoshimura, Japanese former football player and older brother of Keiji Yoshimura

== See also ==
- Asteroid 19161 Sakawa, named after the town
