= Nishi-Sakawa Station =

Railway station in Sakawa, Kōchi Prefecture, Japan

Nishi-Sakawa Station 西佐川駅
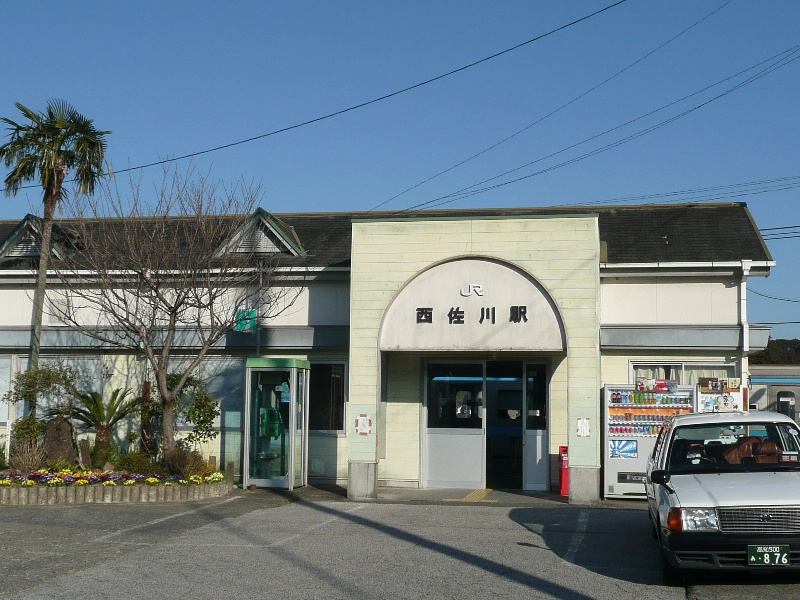
- Nishi-Sakawa Station in 2008

General information
- Location: Otsu, Sakawa, Takaoka-gun, Kōchi-ken 789-1202; Japan
- Coordinates: 33°30′46″N 133°17′12″E
- Operator: JR Shikoku
- Line: ■ Dosan Line
- Distance: 152.4 km from Tadotsu
- Platforms: 1 side + 1 island platforms
- Tracks: 3 + 1 siding

Construction
- Parking: Available
- Accessible: No - footbridge needed to access island platform

Other information
- Status: Unstaffed
- Station code: K12

History
- Opened: 30 March 1924

Passengers
- FY2019: 560
Location
- Location within Kochi Prefecture Location within Japan

Nishi-Sakawa Station (西佐川駅, Nishi-Sakawa-eki) is a passenger railway station located in the town of Sakawa, Takaoka District, Kōchi Prefecture, Japan. It is operated by JR Shikoku and has the station number "K12".

== Lines ==
The station is served by JR Shikoku's Dosan Line and is located 152.4 km from the beginning of the line at Tadotsu.

== Layout ==
The station consists of a side platform and an island platform serving three tracks. A station building, which is unstaffed, serves as a waiting room. A footbridge connects to the island platform. A siding juts partially into the other side of the side platform.

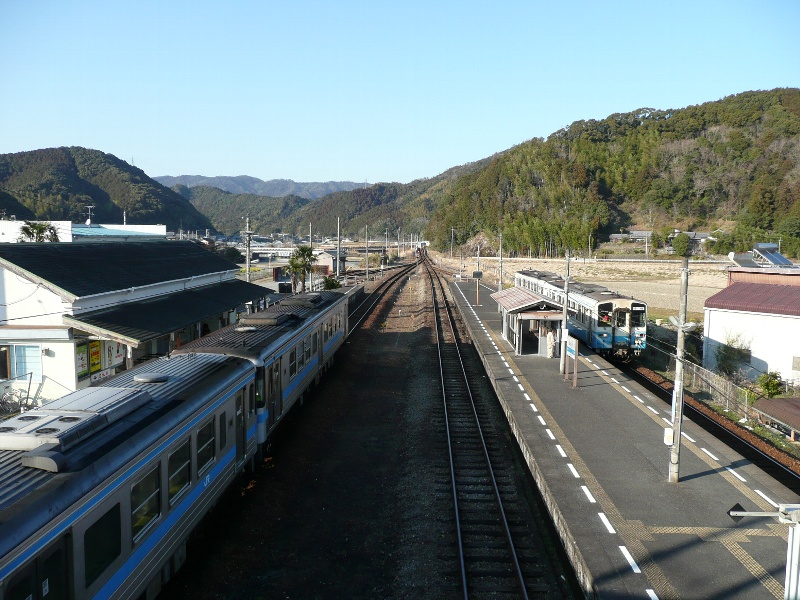
View of the station platforms in 2008 looking in the direction of Kōchi

== Adjacent stations ==
«	Service	»
Dosan Line
Tosa-Kamo	Local	Sakawa

== History ==
The station opened on 30 March 1924 when the then Kōchi Line (later renamed the Dosan Line) was constructed from Susaki to Kusaka. At this time the station was operated by Japanese Government Railways, later becoming Japanese National Railways (JNR). With the privatization of JNR on 1 April 1987, control of the station passed to JR Shikoku.

The station became unstaffed on 1 September 2010 when JR Shikoku closed its ticket counter. In 2016, JR Shikoku handed the station building over to the Sakawa Town authorities who renovated it. On 23 February 2017, the Niyodo Blue Tourism Association (仁淀ブルー観光協議会, Niyodo Burū kankō kyōgi-kai), a body which promotes tourism in the Niyodogawa river valley, moved its offices into the station building and also set up a tourist information centre there.

== Surrounding area ==
- Kochi Prefectural Sagawa High School
- Sagawa Municipal Sagawa Elementary School

== See also ==
- List of railway stations in Japan
