= Hayama, Kōchi =

Dissolved municipality in Kōchi prefecture, Japan

Hayama (葉山村, Hayama-mura) was a village located in Takaoka District, Kōchi Prefecture, Japan.

As of 2003, the village had an estimated population of 4,305 and a density of 64.49 persons per km^{2}. The total area was 66.75 km^{2}.

On February 1, 2005, Hayama, along with the village of Higashitsuno (also from Takaoka District), was merged to create the town of Tsuno and no longer exists as an independent municipality.
