= Hiroshi Takahashi (architect) =

Japanese architect (born 1953)

Hiroshi Takahashi (高橋 ヒロシ, Takahashi Hiroshi; born 1953) is a Japanese architect.

Takahashi was born in Tokyo and received his graduate degree in architecture from the Tokyo Institute of Technology in 1978. In 1985, he joined the faculty at the Tokyo Institute of Technology. In 1988, he and Akiko Takahashi founded the firm Workstation in Yokohama. In 1991, Hiroshi Takahashi joined the faculty at Kanto Gakuin University, Nihon University and Hosei University.

== Workstation ==
The first project that Akiko Takahashi and Hiroshi Takahashi pursued together was the Sakamoto Ryoma Memorial Museum in Kochi. Other works that Workstation has completed include the Nakamachidai Community Center in Yokohama, the Sakuraza Town Hall in Sakawa, and the Playground & Rest House at the Nogeyama Zoo.
