= Awa Station =

Railway station in Susaki, Kōchi Prefecture, Japan

K21 Awa Station 安和駅
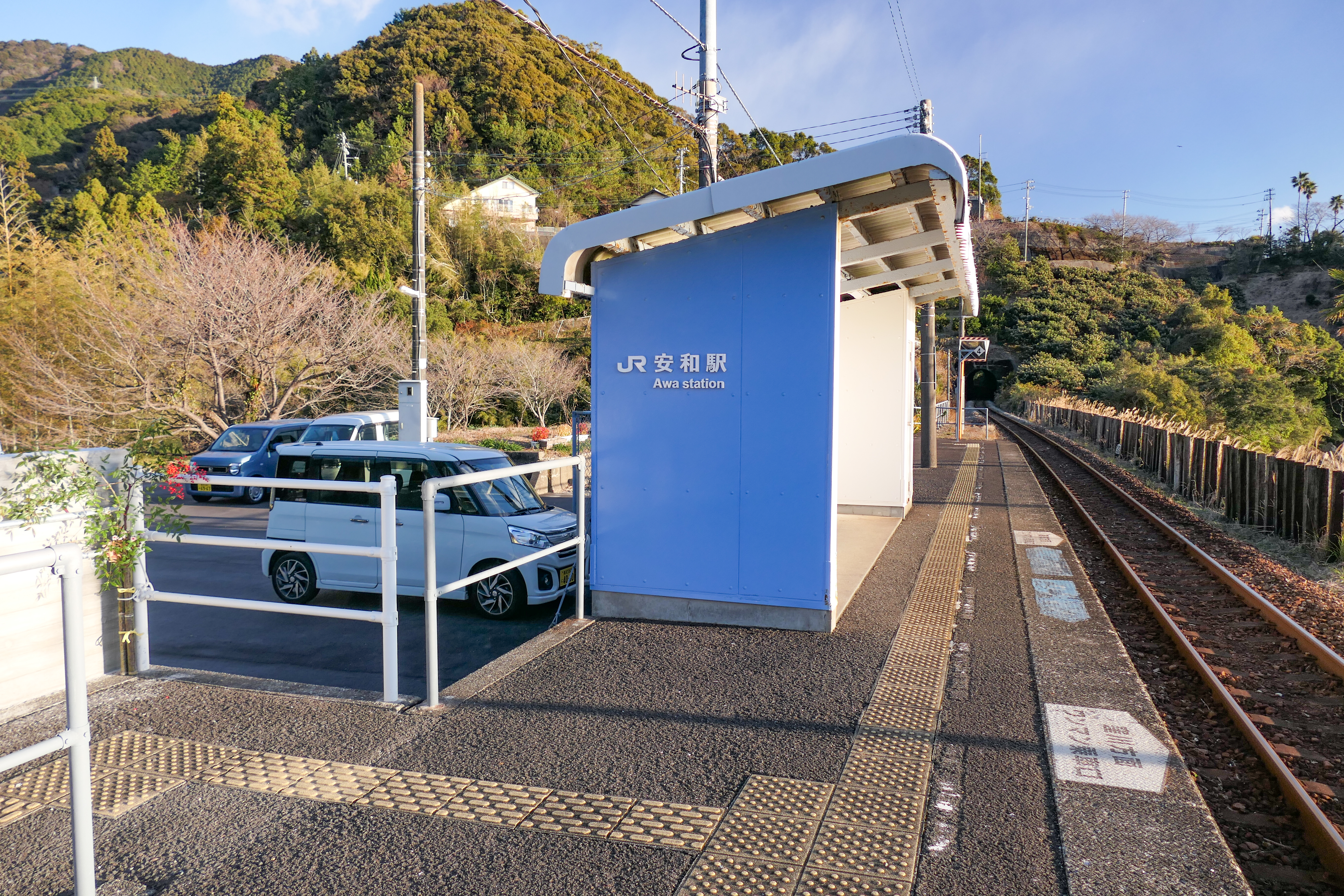
- Awa Station in 2021

General information
- Location: Awa, Susaki-shi, Kōchi-ken 785-0024; Japan
- Coordinates: 33°22′01″N 133°15′33″E
- Operator: JR Shikoku
- Line: ■ Dosan Line
- Distance: 173.6 km from Tadotsu
- Platforms: 1 side platform
- Tracks: 1

Construction
- Parking: Available
- Accessible: Yes - ramp leads up to platform

Other information
- Status: Unstaffed
- Station code: K21

History
- Opened: 15 September 1939

Passengers
- FY2019: 26
Location
- Location within Kochi Prefecture Location within Japan

Awa Station (安和駅, Awa-eki) is a passenger railway station located in the city of Susaki, Kōchi Prefecture, Japan. It is operated by JR Shikoku and has the station number "K21".

== Lines ==
The station is served by JR Shikoku's Dosan Line and is located 173.6 km from the beginning of the line at Tadotsu.

== Layout ==
The unstaffed station consists of a side platform serving a single track. There is no station building, only a weather shelter on the platform for waiting passengers. A ramp leads up to the platform from the access road. A public telephone callbox is provided at the base of the ramp. Parking is available in the open space around the station entrance. The side platform was formerly an island platform. There are also the remains of a former freight platform.

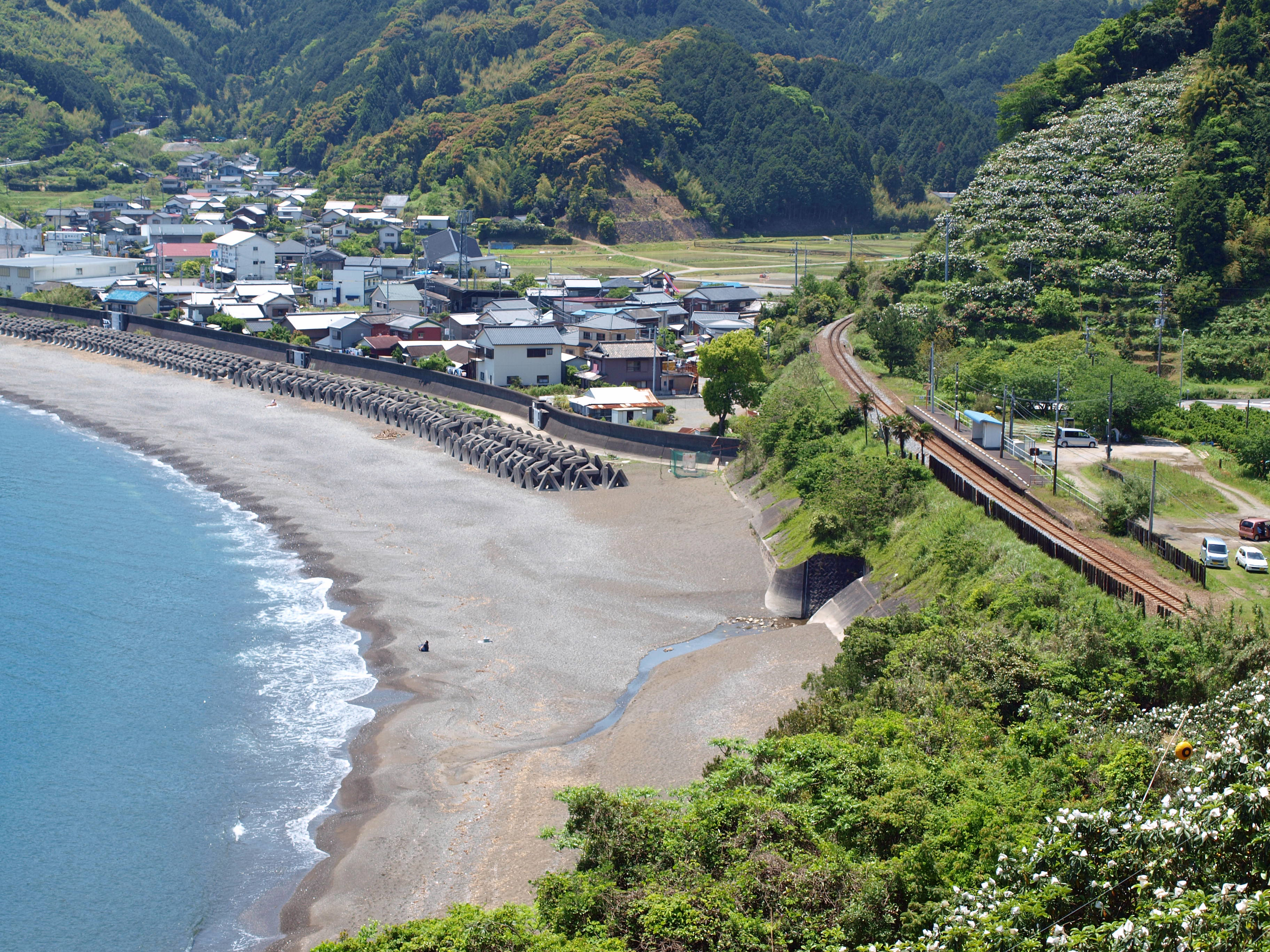
Surrounding area of Awa Station in 2010 looking in the direction of Kubokawa. The parking area and the remains of the freight platform can be seen.

== Adjacent stations ==
«	Service	»
Dosan Line
Tosa-Shinjō	Local	Tosa-Kure

== History ==
The station opened on 15 September 1939 when the Dosan Line was extended westwards from Susaki to Tosa-Kure. At this time the station was operated by Japanese Government Railways, later becoming Japanese National Railways (JNR). With the privatization of JNR on 1 April 1987, control of the station passed to JR Shikoku.

== Surrounding area ==
- Japan National Route 56

== See also ==
- List of railway stations in Japan
