= Tosa-Shinjō Station =

Railway station in Susaki, Kōchi Prefecture, Japan

K20 Tosa-Shinjō Station 土佐新荘駅
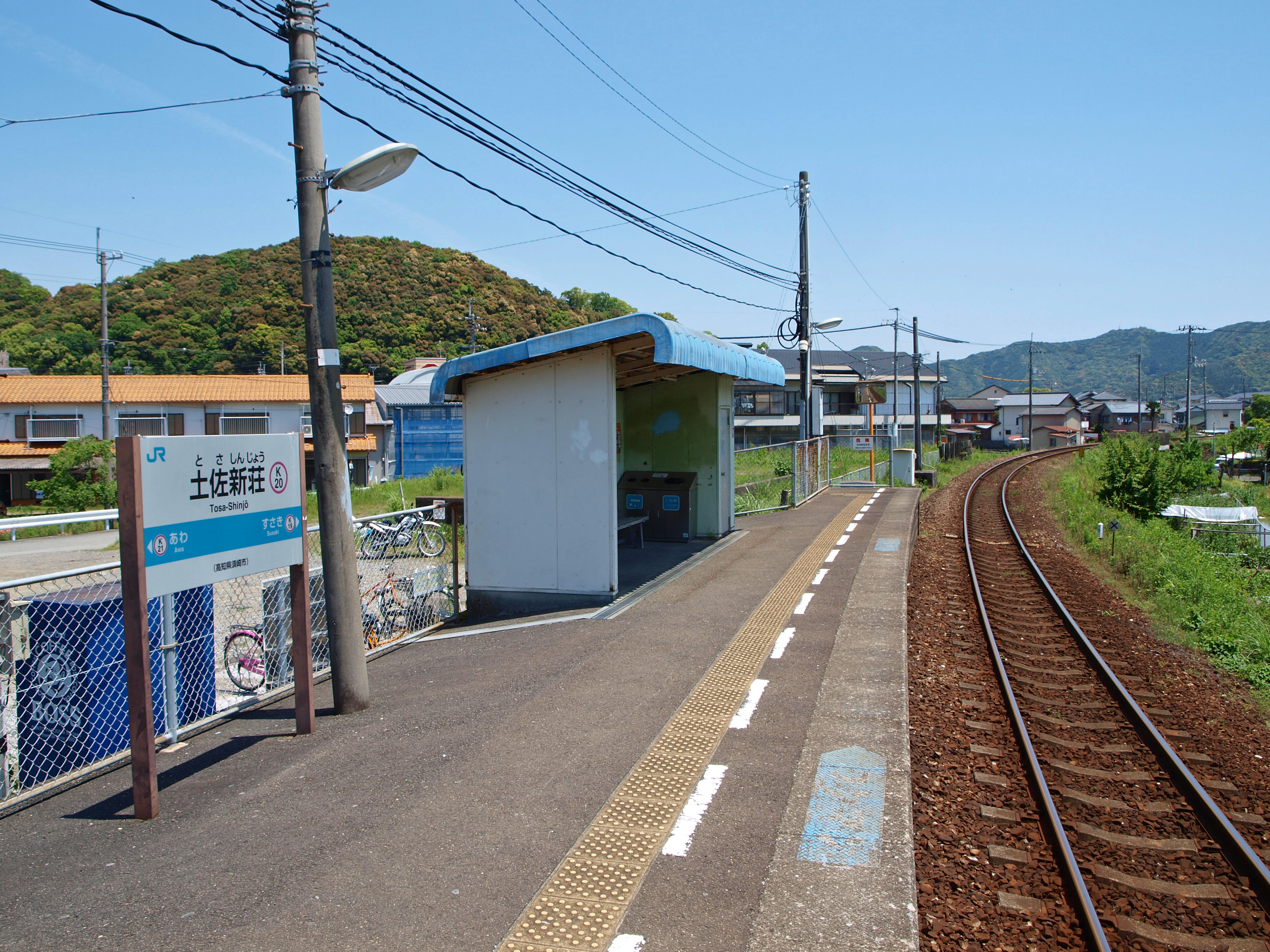
- Tosa-Shinjō Station in 2010

General information
- Location: 2 Chome-10 Nishimachi, Susaki-shi, Kōchi-ken 785-0009; Japan
- Coordinates: 33°23′11″N 133°16′41″E
- Operator: JR Shikoku
- Line: ■ Dosan Line
- Distance: 170.6 km from Tadotsu
- Platforms: 1 side platform
- Tracks: 1

Construction
- Accessible: Yes - ramp leads up to platform

Other information
- Status: Unstaffed
- Station code: K20

History
- Opened: 15 September 1939

Passengers
- FY2019: 164
Location
- Location within Kochi Prefecture Location within Japan

Tosa-Shinjō Station (土佐新荘駅, Tosa-Shinjō-eki) is a passenger railway station located in the city of Susaki, Kōchi Prefecture, Japan. It is operated by JR Shikoku and has the station number "K20".

== Lines ==
The station is served by JR Shikoku's Dosan Line and is located 170.6 km from the beginning of the line at Tadotsu.

== Layout ==
The station, which is not staffed, consists of a side platform serving a single track. There is no station building, only a weather shelter on the platform for waiting passengers. A ramp leads up to the platform from the access road.

== Adjacent stations ==
«	Service	»
Dosan Line
Susaki	Local	Awa

== History ==
The station opened on 15 September 1939 when the Dosan Line was extended westwards from Susaki to Tosa-Kure. At this time the station was operated by Japanese Government Railways, later becoming Japanese National Railways (JNR). With the privatization of JNR on 1 April 1987, control of the station passed to JR Shikoku.

== Surrounding area ==
- Susaki Municipal Susaki Junior High School
- Japan National Route 56

== See also ==
- List of railway stations in Japan
