= Rokutanji Station =

Railway station in Shimanto, Kōchi Prefecture, Japan

K24 Rokutanji Station 六反地駅
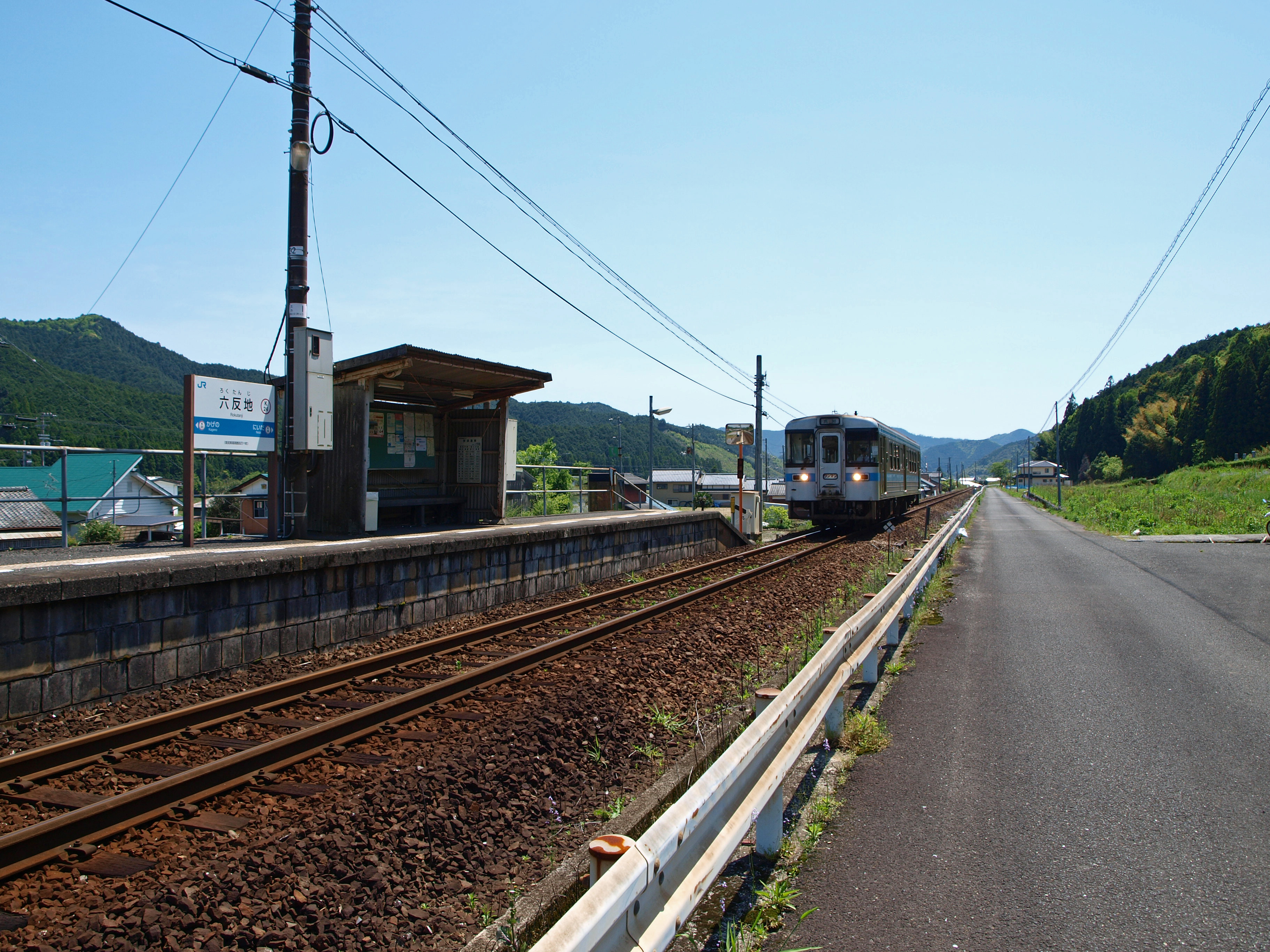
- Rokutanji Station in 2010

General information
- Location: Rokutanji, Shimanto-cho, Takaoka-gun, Kōchi-ken 786-0035; Japan
- Coordinates: 33°15′43″N 133°10′11″E
- Operator: JR Shikoku
- Line: ■ Dosan Line
- Distance: 192.2 km from Tadotsu
- Platforms: 1 side platform
- Tracks: 1

Construction
- Accessible: Yes - ramp leads up to platform

Other information
- Status: Unstaffed
- Station code: K24

History
- Opened: 15 April 1961

Passengers
- FY2018: 10
Location
- Location within Kochi Prefecture Location within Japan

Rokutanji Station (六反地駅, Rokutanji-eki) is a passenger railway station located in the town of Shimanto, Takaoka District, Kōchi Prefecture, Japan. It is operated by JR Shikoku and has the station number "K24".

== Lines ==
The station is served by JR Shikoku's Dosan Line and is located 192.2 km from the beginning of the line at Tadotsu.

== Layout ==
Rokutanji Station, which is unstaffed, consists of a side platform serving a single track. There is no station building, only a shelter for waiting passengers. A ramp leads up from the access road to the platform.

== Adjacent stations ==
«	Service	»
Dosan Line
Kageno	Local	Niida

== History ==
The station was opened on 15 April 1961 by Japanese National Railways (JNR) as a new station on the existing Dosan Line. With the privatization of JNR on 1 April 1987, control of the station passed to JR Shikoku.

== Surrounding area ==
- Japan National Route 56

== See also ==
- List of railway stations in Japan
