= Higashitsuno, Kōchi =

Dissolved municipality in Kōchi prefecture, Japan

Higashitsuno (東津野村, Higashitsuno-mura) was a village located in Takaoka District, Kōchi Prefecture, Japan.

As of 2003, the village has an estimated population of 2,736 and a density of 20.81 persons per km^{2}. The total area was 131.47 km^{2}.

On February 1, 2005, Higashitsuno, along with the village of Hayama (also from Takaoka District), was merged to create the town of Tsuno and no longer exists as an independent municipality.

Pro-imperial activist Yoshimura Torataro was born there in 1837.
