= Niida Station (Kōchi) =

Railway station in Shimanto, Kōchi Prefecture, Japan

K25 Niida Station 仁井田駅
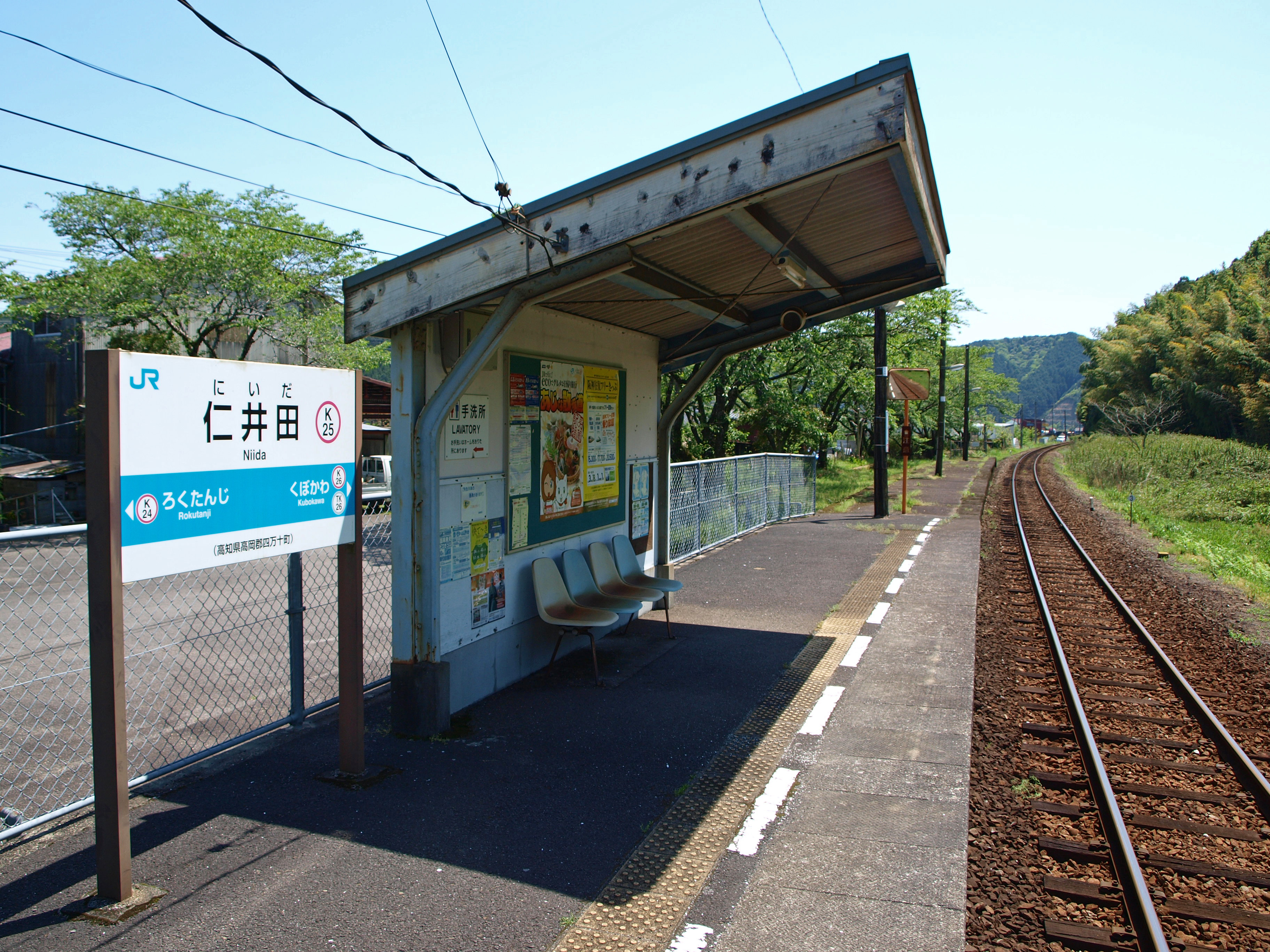
- Niida Station in May 2010

General information
- Location: Niida, Shimanto City, Takaoka District; Kōchi Prefecture 786-0021; Japan
- Coordinates: 33°14′42″N 133°09′41″E
- Operator: JR Shikoku
- Line: Dosan Line
- Distance: 194.2 km (120.7 mi) from Tadotsu
- Platforms: 1 side platform
- Tracks: 1

Construction
- Structure type: At grade
- Accessible: Yes - ramp leads up to platform

Other information
- Status: Unstaffed
- Station code: K25

History
- Opened: 12 November 1951; 74 years ago

Passengers
- FY2018: 26

Services
Preceding station	JR Shikoku	Following station
Kubokawa K26 Terminus	Dosan Line	Rokutanji K24 towards Tadotsu
Location
- Location within Kochi Prefecture Location within Japan

Niida Station (仁井田駅, Niida-eki) is a passenger railway station located in the town of Shimanto, Takaoka District, Kōchi Prefecture, Japan. It is operated by JR Shikoku and has the station number "K25".

== Lines ==
The station is served by JR Shikoku's Dosan Line and is located 194.2 km from the beginning of the line at Tadotsu.

== Layout ==
Niida Station, an unstaffed station, consists of a side platform serving a single track. A station building is located slightly away from the platform and serves as a waiting room. A ramp leads from the building to the platform. The platform was originally an island format, serving two tracks but one track has been removed.

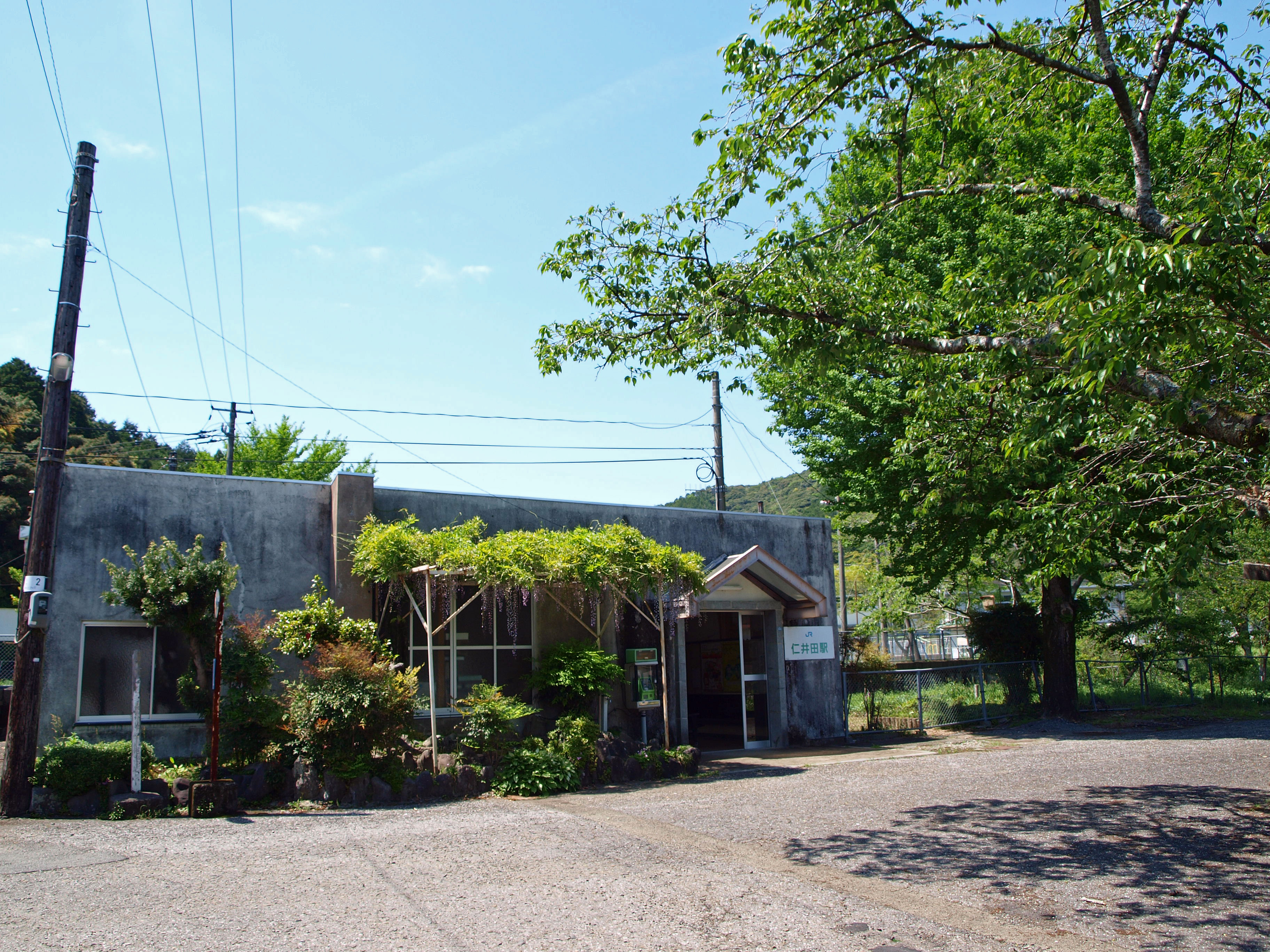
The Niida Station waiting room.

== History ==
The station was opened by Japanese National Railways (JNR) on 12 November 1951 as an intermediate stop when the Dosan Line was extended westwards from Kageno to Kubokawa. With the privatization of JNR on 1 April 1987, control of the station passed to JR Shikoku.

== Surrounding area ==
- Shimanto Town Niida Elementary School
- Japan National Route 56

== See also ==
- List of railway stations in Japan
