= Erinono Station =

Railway station in Sakawa, Kōchi Prefecture, Japan

Erinono Station 襟野々駅
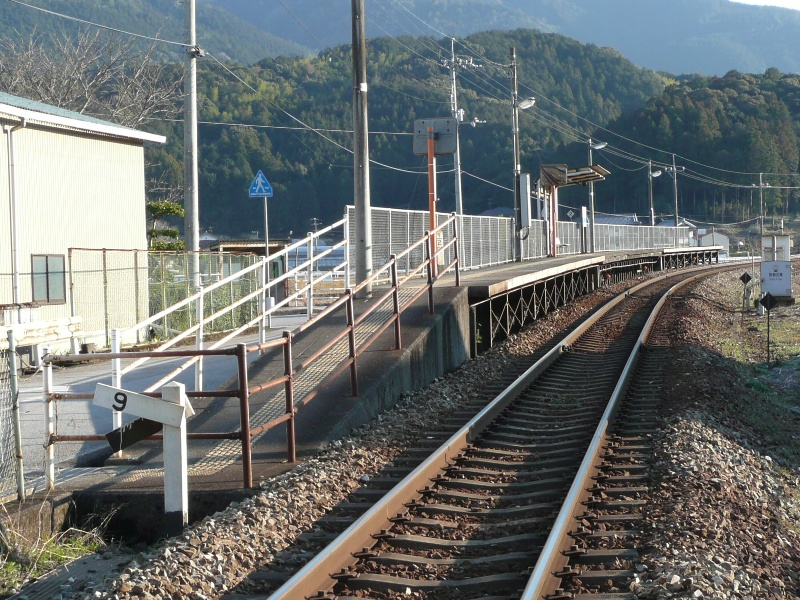
- Erinono Station in 2008

General information
- Location: Nagano, Sakawa, Takaoka-gun, Kōchi-ken 789-1231; Japan
- Coordinates: 33°29′19″N 133°18′02″E
- Operator: JR Shikoku
- Line: ■ Dosan Line
- Distance: 156.0 km from Tadotsu
- Platforms: 1 side platform
- Tracks: 1

Construction
- Accessible: Yes - ramp leads up to platform

Other information
- Status: Unstaffed
- Station code: K14

History
- Opened: 1 October 1960

Passengers
- FY2019: 150
Location
- Location within Kochi Prefecture Location within Japan

Erinono Station (襟野々駅, Erinono-eki) is a passenger railway station located in the town of Sakawa, Takaoka District, Kōchi Prefecture, Japan. It is operated by JR Shikoku and has the station number "K14".

== Lines ==
The station is served by JR Shikoku's Dosan Line and is located 156.0 km from the beginning of the line at Tadotsu.

== Layout ==
The station consists of a side platform serving a single track. There is no station building, only a weather shelter on the platform for waiting passengers. A ramp leads up to the platform from the access road.

== Adjacent stations ==
«	Service	»
Dosan Line
Sakawa	Local	Togano

== History ==
The station opened on 1 October 1960 as a new stop on the existing Dosan Line. At this time the station was operated by Japanese National Railways (JNR). With the privatization of JNR on 1 April 1987, control of the station passed to JR Shikoku.

== Surrounding area ==
- Goiyama Ryokuchi Park
- Erinono Public Hall

== See also ==
- List of railway stations in Japan
