= Kageno Station =

Railway station in Shimanto, Kōchi Prefecture, Japan

K23 Kageno Station 影野駅
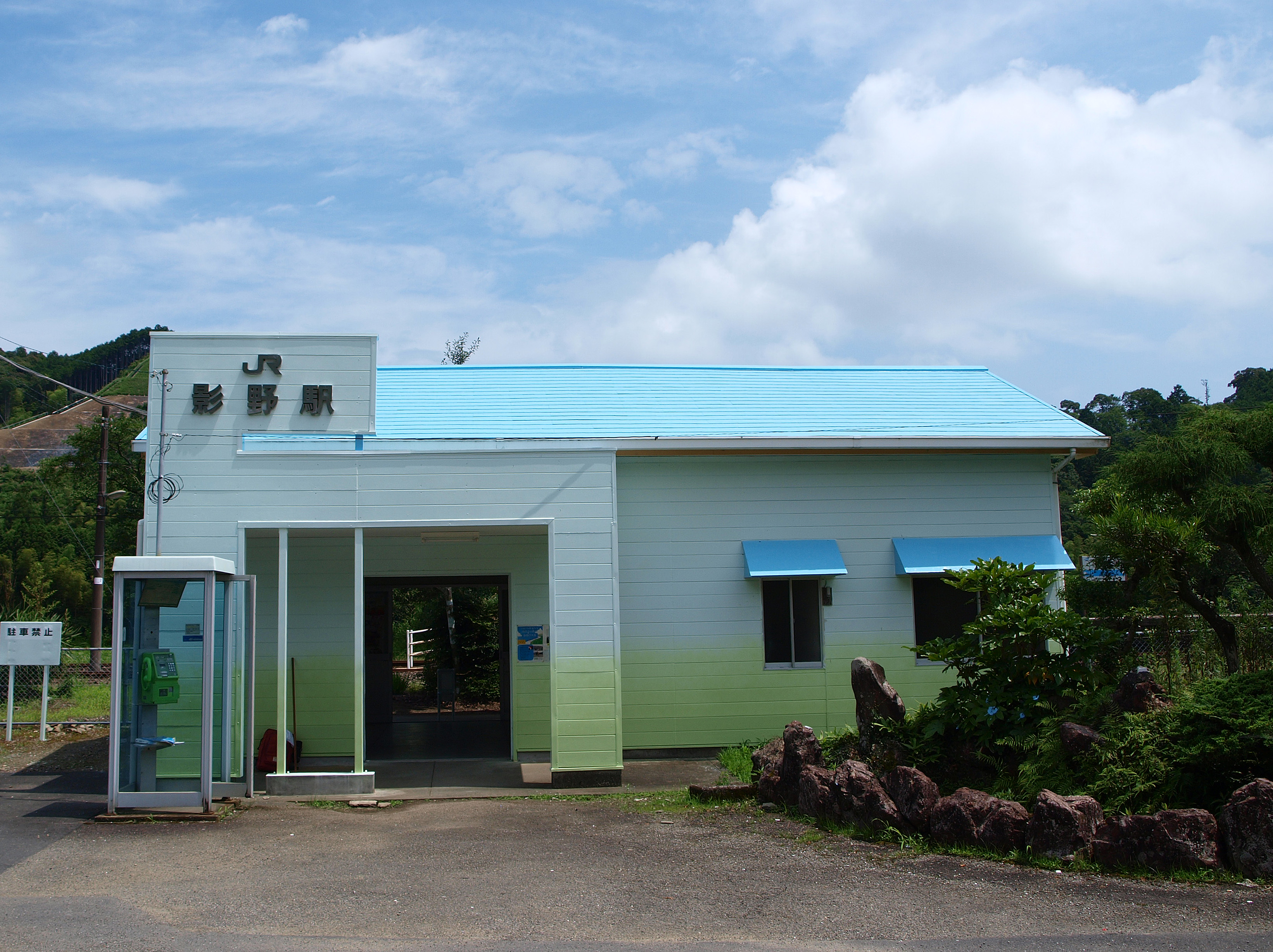
- Kageno Station in July 2010

General information
- Location: Kageno, Shimanto, Takaoka-gun, Kōchi-ken 786-0032; Japan
- Coordinates: 33°16′34″N 133°10′26″E
- Operator: JR Shikoku
- Line: ■ Dosan Line
- Distance: 190.4 km from Tadotsu
- Platforms: 1 island platform
- Tracks: 2 + 1 siding

Construction
- Accessible: Yes - island platform accessed by ramps and a level crossing

Other information
- Status: Unstaffed
- Station code: K23

History
- Opened: 20 October 1947

Passengers
- FY2018: 28
Location
- Location within Kochi Prefecture Location within Japan

Kageno Station (影野駅, Kageno-eki) is a passenger railway station located in the town of Shimanto, Takaoka District, Kōchi Prefecture, Japan. It is operated by JR Shikoku and has the station number "K23".

== Lines ==
The station is served by JR Shikoku's Dosan Line and is located 190.4 km from the beginning of the line at Tadotsu.

== Layout ==
Kageno Station consists of an island platform serving two tracks. A station building, which is unstaffed, serves as a waiting room. The island platform is accessed by means of a ramp and a level crossing. There is a siding to one side of the island platform.

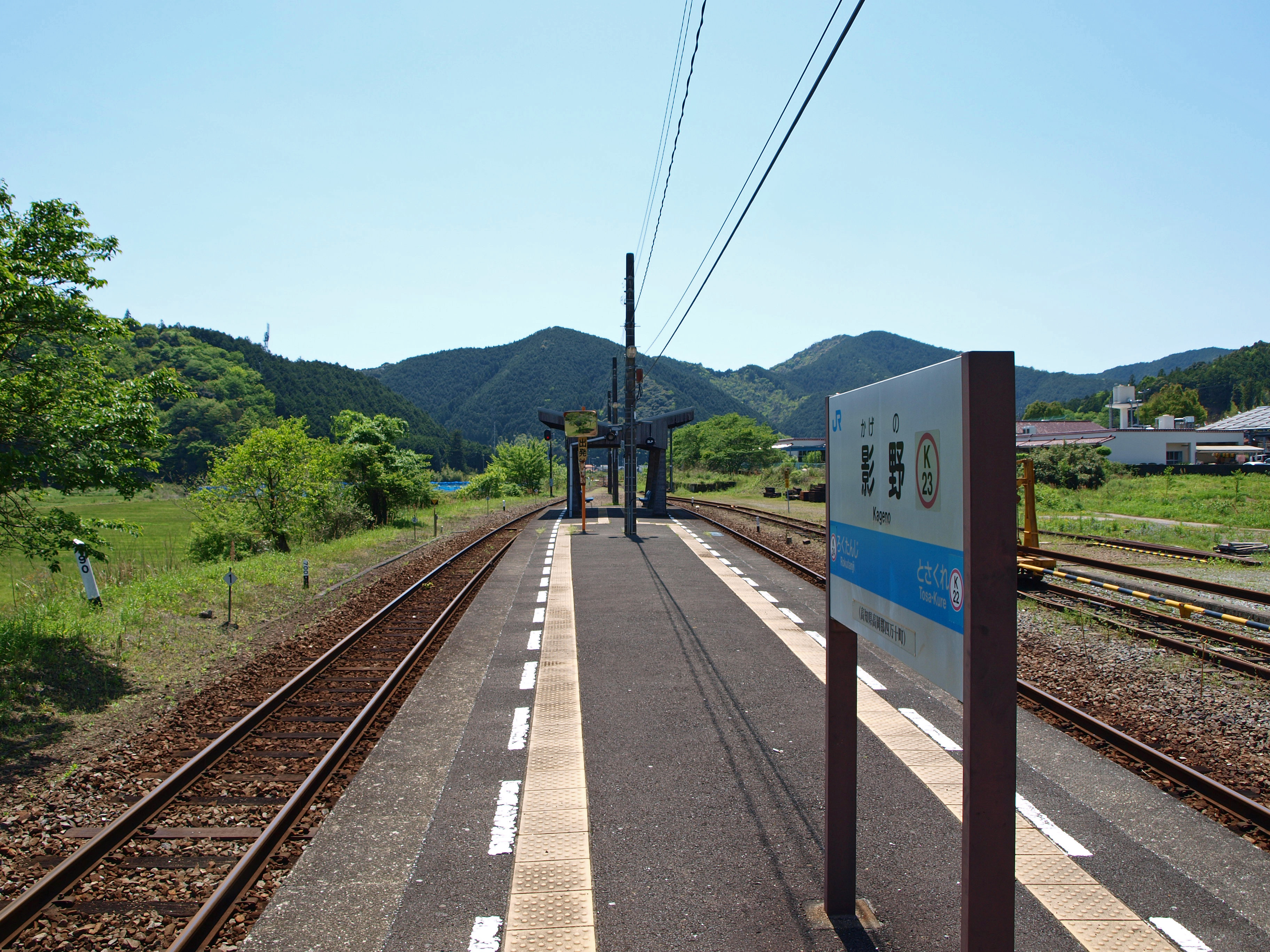
A view of the island platform looking in the direction of Kubokawa. The siding can be seen to the right of the picture.

== Adjacent stations ==
«	Service	»
Dosan Line
Tosa-Kure	Local	Rokutanji

== History ==
The station opened on 20 October 1947 as the terminus of the Dosan Line which was extended westwards from Tosa-Kure. It became a through-station on 12 November 1951 when the track was further extended to Kubokawa. At the time it was opened, the station was operated by Japanese National Railways (JNR). With the privatization of JNR on 1 April 1987, control of the station passed to JR Shikoku.

== Surrounding area ==
- Shimanto Town Kageno Elementary School

== See also ==
- List of railway stations in Japan
