= Sakawa Station =

Railway station in Sakawa, Kōchi Prefecture, Japan

Sakawa Station 佐川駅
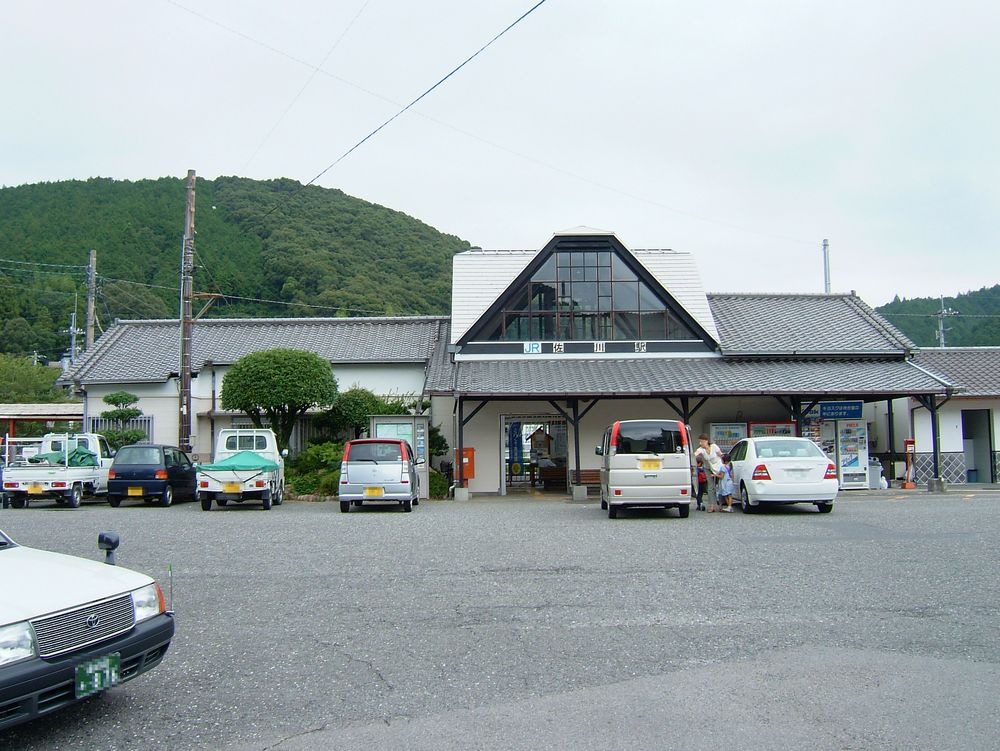
- Sakawa Station in 2006

General information
- Location: Ko, Sakawa, Takaoka-gun, Kōchi-ken 789-1201; Japan
- Coordinates: 33°30′00″N 133°17′33″E
- Operator: JR Shikoku
- Line: ■ Dosan Line
- Distance: 154.2 km from Tadotsu
- Platforms: 2 side platforms
- Tracks: 2

Construction
- Parking: Available
- Accessible: Yes - platforms linked by ramps and a level crossing

Other information
- Status: staffed - JR ticket window (no Midori no Madoguchi)
- Station code: K13
- Website: Official website

History
- Opened: 30 March 1924

Passengers
- FY2019: 768
Location
- Location within Kochi Prefecture Location within Japan

Sakawa Station (佐川駅, Sakawa-eki) is a passenger railway station located in the town of Sakawa, Takaoka District, Kōchi Prefecture, Japan. It is operated by JR Shikoku and has the station number "K13".

== Lines ==
The station is served by JR Shikoku's Dosan Line and is located 154.2 km from the beginning of the line at Tadotsu.

In addition to the local trains of the Dosan Line, the following limited express services also stop at Sakawa Station:

- Nanpū - Okayama to Kōchi, Nakamura and Sukumo
- Shimanto - Takamatsu to Kōchi, Nakamura and Sukumo
- Ashizuri - Kōchi to Nakamura and Sukumo

== Layout ==
The station consists of two opposed side platforms serving three tracks. A station building houses a waiting room and a JR ticket window (without a Midori no Madoguchi facility) as well as a tourist information centre set up by the local municipality. Access to the platform opposite the station building is by a level crossing. A footbridge spans the tracks, allowing access to the station front entrance from the main road on the other side of the tracks. Parking lots are provided.

== Adjacent stations ==
«	Service	»
JR Limited Express Services
Ino	Nanpū	Susaki
Ino	Shimanto	Susaki
Ino	Ashizuri	Susaki
Dosan Line
Nishi-Sakawa	Local	Erinono

== History ==
The station opened on 30 March 1924 when the then Kōchi Line (later renamed the Dosan Line) was constructed from Susaki to Kusaka. At this time the station was operated by Japanese Government Railways, later becoming Japanese National Railways (JNR). With the privatization of JNR on 1 April 1987, control of the station passed to JR Shikoku.

On 4 March 2017, Sakawa town authorities opened a tourist information centre inside the station building using space offered by JR Shikoku. The centre, which is unstaffed, features a custom-built information terminal about Sakawa town, maps and brochures, educational displays as well as a model of a local historic building.

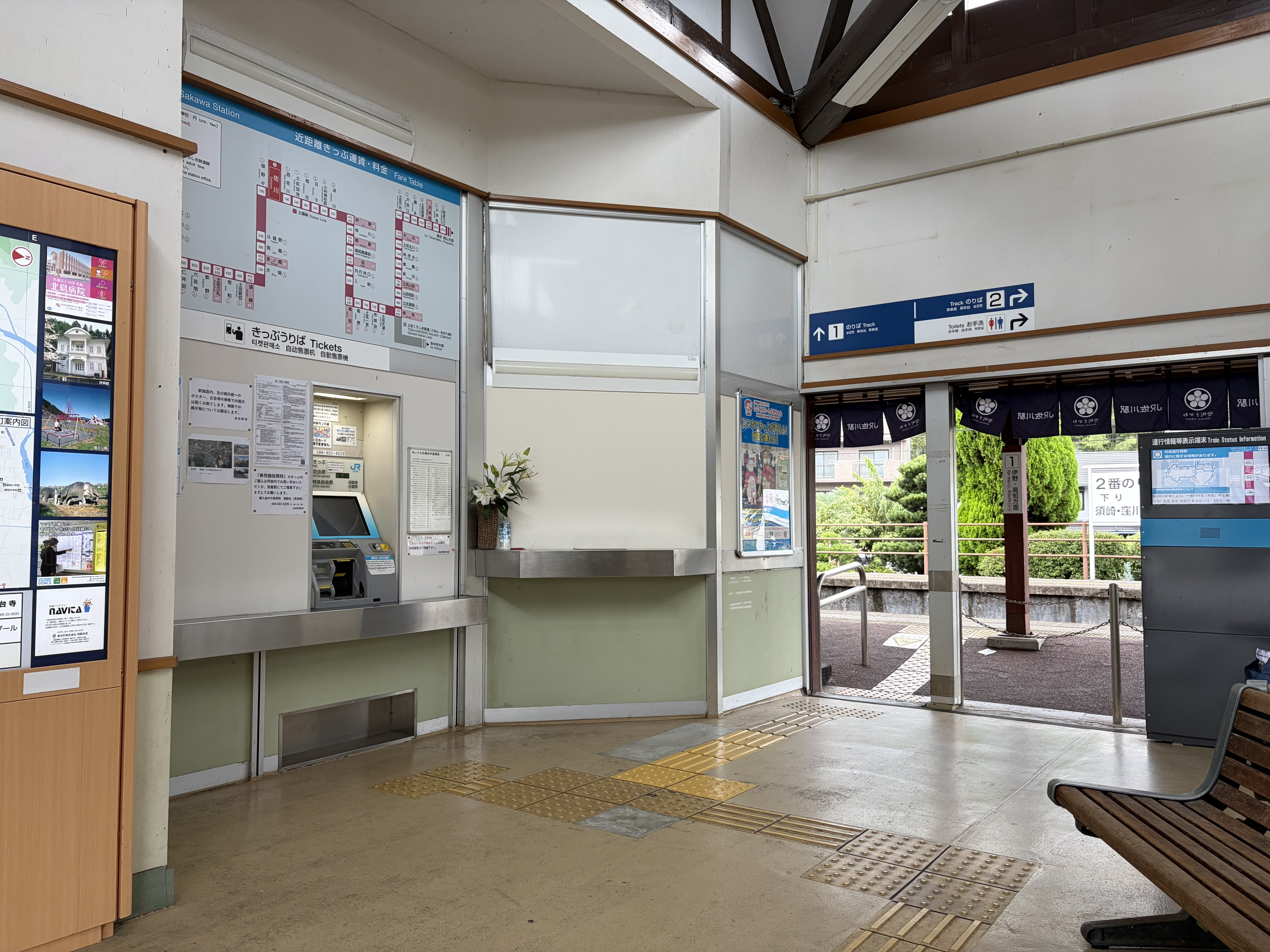
Inside the station building.

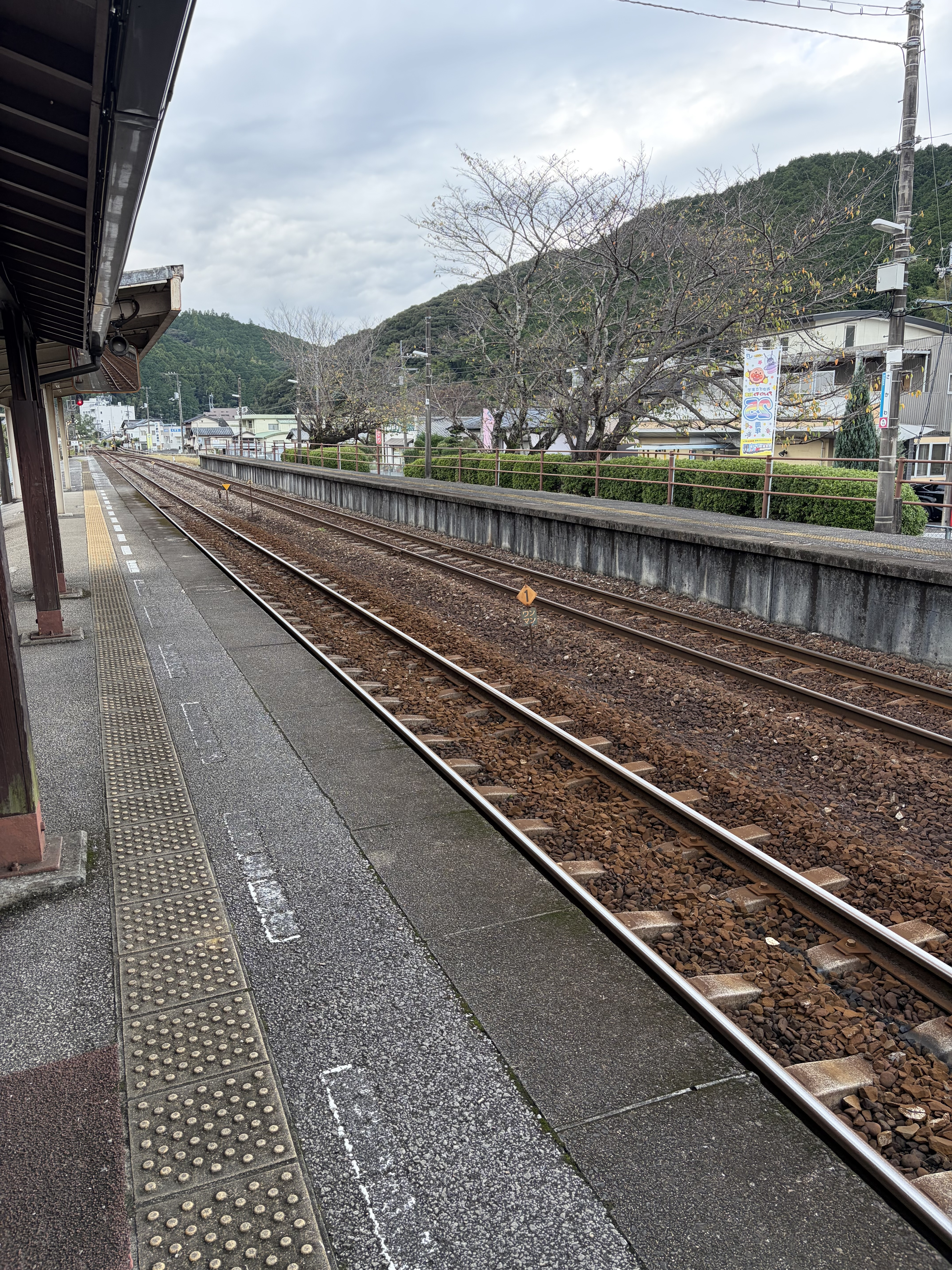
On the platform, looking towards Kochi.

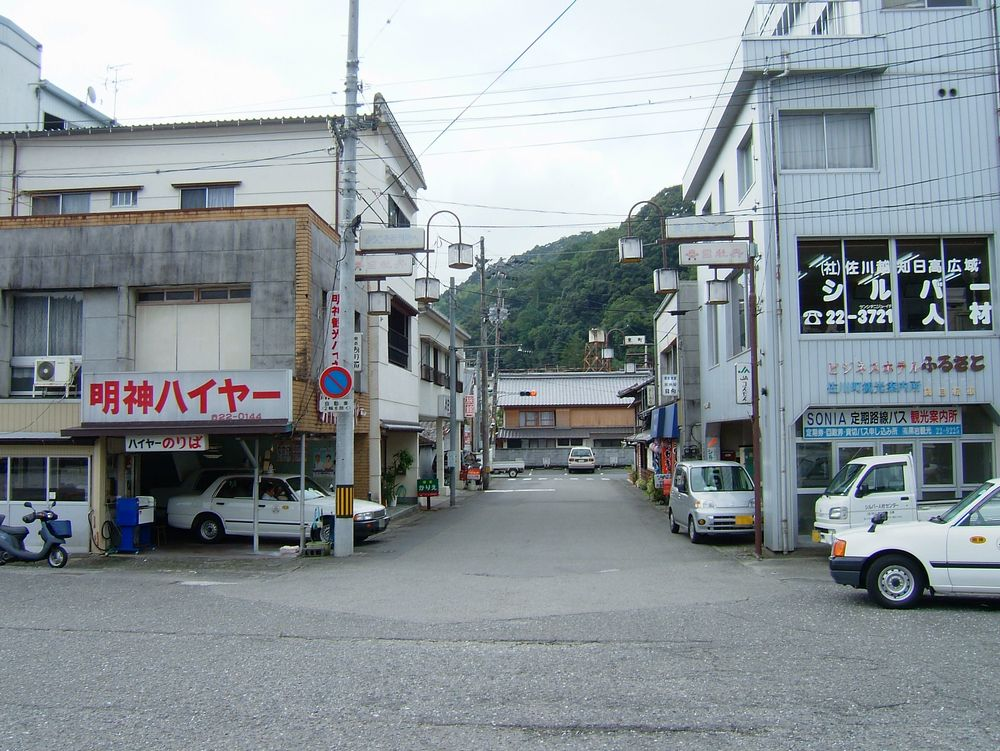
View from the station.

== Surrounding area ==
- Sagawa Town Office
- Japan National Route 33

== See also ==
- List of railway stations in Japan
