= Tosa-Kure Station =

Railway station in Nakatosa, Kōchi Prefecture, Japan

K22 Tosa-Kure Station 土佐久礼駅
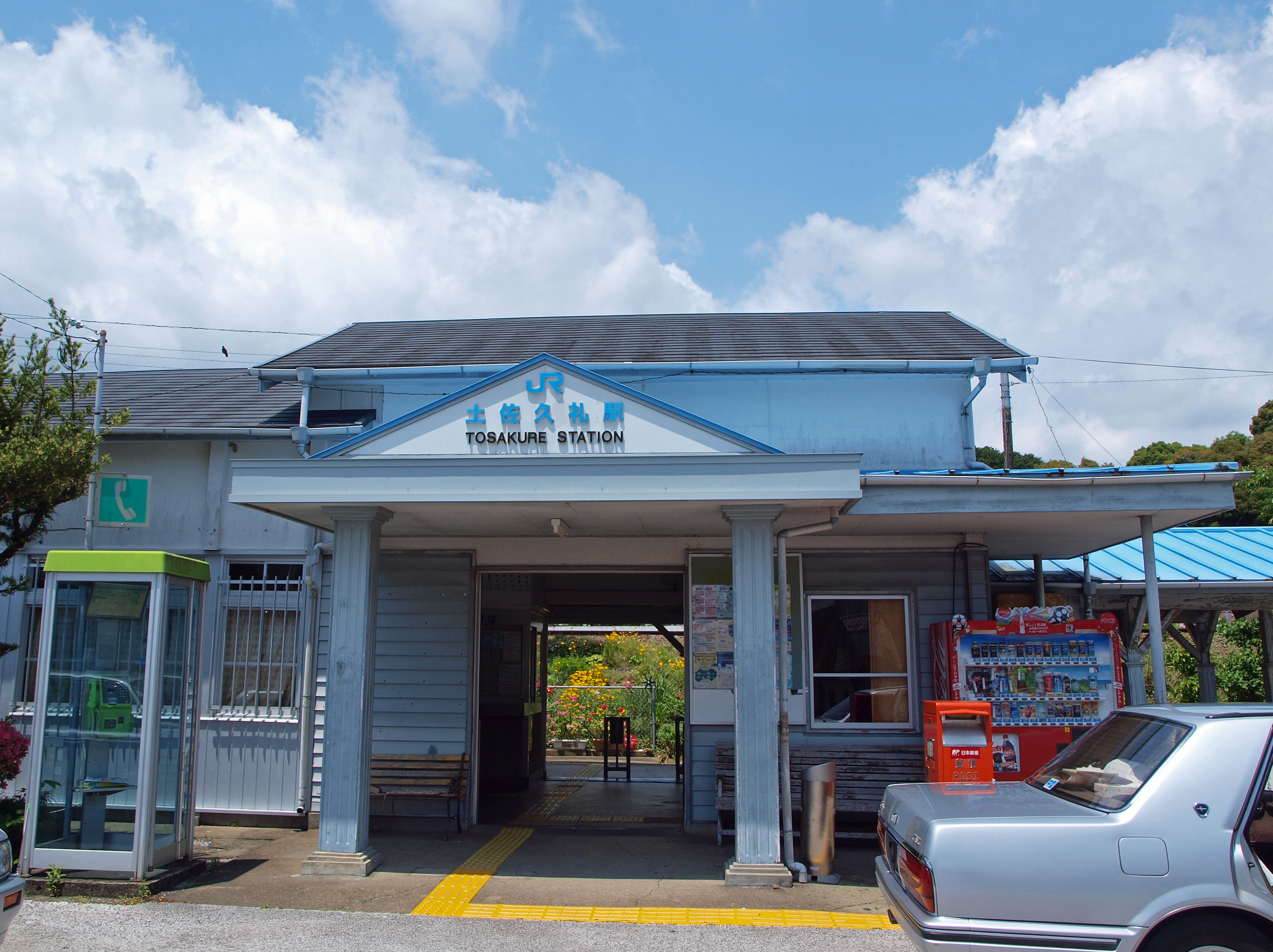
- Tosa-Kure Station in 2010

General information
- Location: Kure, Nakatosa, Takaoka-gun, Kōchi-ken 789-1301; Japan
- Coordinates: 33°19′45″N 133°13′35″E
- Operator: JR Shikoku
- Line: ■ Dosan Line
- Distance: 179.7 km from Tadotsu
- Platforms: 1 island platform
- Tracks: 2 + 1 passing loop + 1 siding

Construction
- Parking: Available
- Accessible: Yes - island platform accessed by ramps and a level crossing

Other information
- Status: Ticket window operated by a kan'i itaku agent
- Station code: K22

History
- Opened: 15 September 1939

Passengers
- FY2019: 332
Location
- Location within Japan

Tosa-Kure Station (土佐久礼駅, Tosa-Kure-eki) is a railway station on the Dosan Line in Nakatosa, Takaoka District, Kōchi Prefecture, Japan. It is operated by JR Shikoku and has the station number "K22".

== Lines ==
The station is served by JR Shikoku's Dosan Line and is located 179.7 km from the beginning of the line at Tadotsu.

In addition to the local trains of the Dosan Line, the following limited express services also stop at Tosa-Kure Station:

- Nanpū - Okayama to Kōchi, Nakamura and Sukumo
- Shimanto - Takamatsu to Kōchi, Nakamura and Sukumo
- Ashizuri - Kōchi to Nakamura and Sukumo

== Layout ==
The station consists of an island platform serving two tracks. A station building, which is located at a lower level than the tracks, houses a waiting room. The island platform is accessed by means of a ramp and a level crossing. There is also a passing loop and a siding which leads to a separate freight platform used for the loading of ballast.

JR Shikoku closed its ticket window at the station on 1 October 2010. Subsequently, a kan'i itaku agent reopened the window and continued selling tickets from a JR Shikoku POS machine.

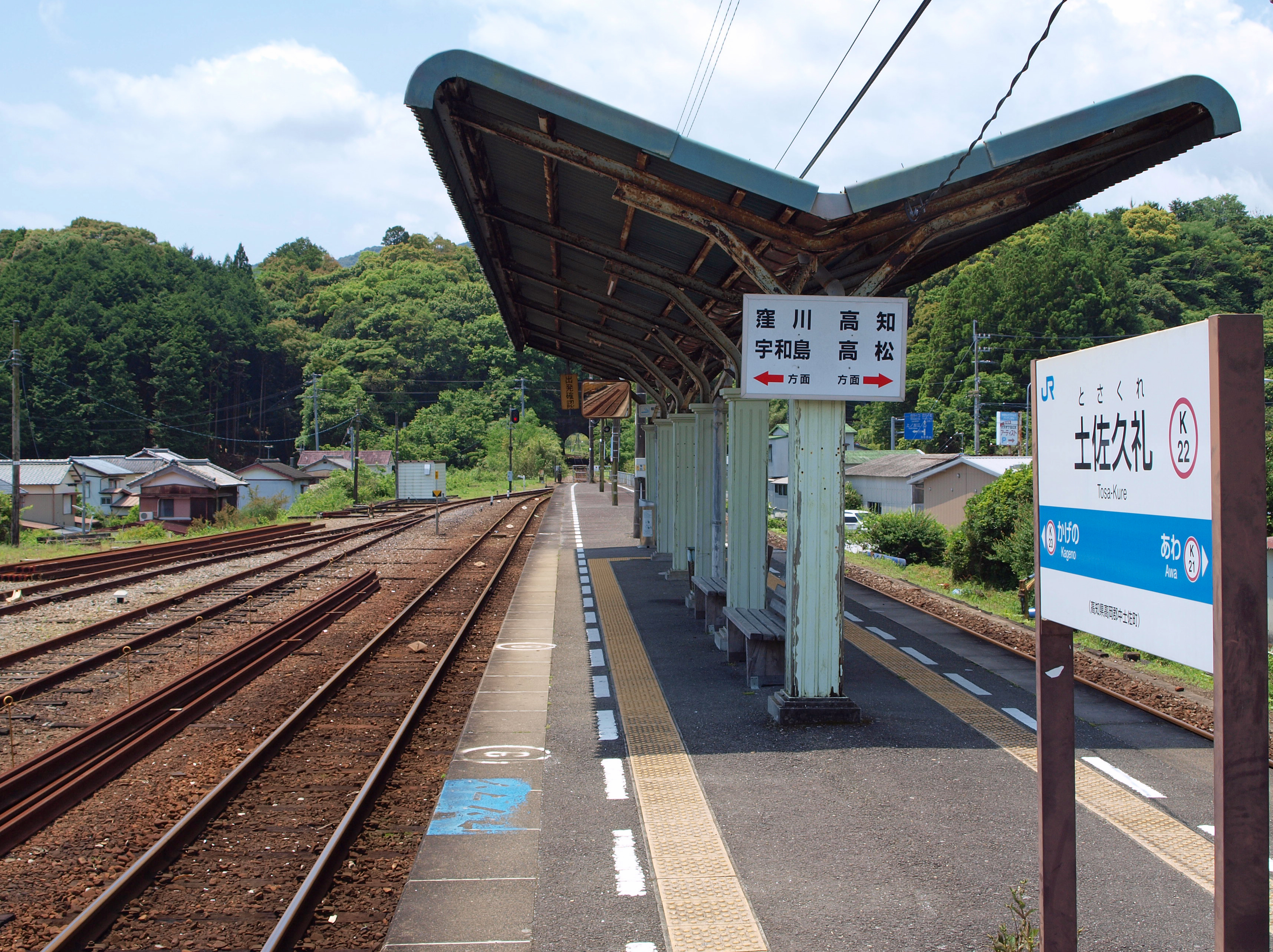
A view of the island platform looking in the direction of Kubokawa.

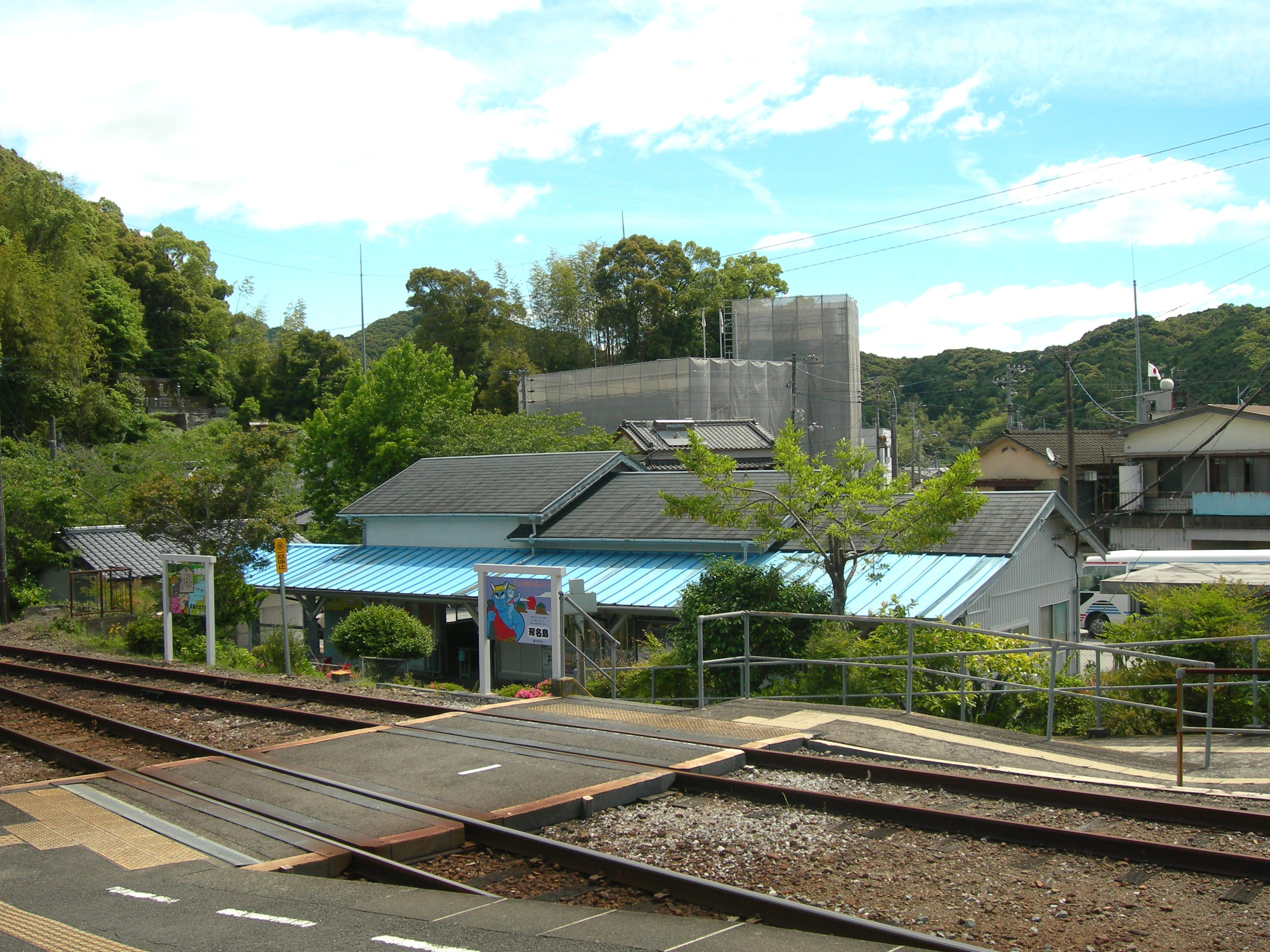
The level crossing to the station building as seen from the island platform.

== Adjacent stations ==
| « | Service | » |
JR Limited Express Services
| Susaki | Nanpū | Kubokawa |
| Susaki | Shimanto | Kubokawa |
| Susaki | Ashizuri | Kubokawa |
Dosan Line
| Awa | Local | Kageno |

== History ==
The station opened on 15 September 1939 as the terminus of the Dosan Line which was extended westwards from Susaki. It became a through-station on 20 October 1947 when the track was further extended to Kageno. At the time it was opened, the station was operated by Japanese Government Railways, later becoming Japanese National Railways (JNR). With the privatization of JNR on 1 April 1987, control of the station passed to JR Shikoku.

== See also ==
- List of railway stations in Japan
