= Susaki Station =

Railway station in Susaki, Kōchi Prefecture, Japan

Susaki Station 須崎駅
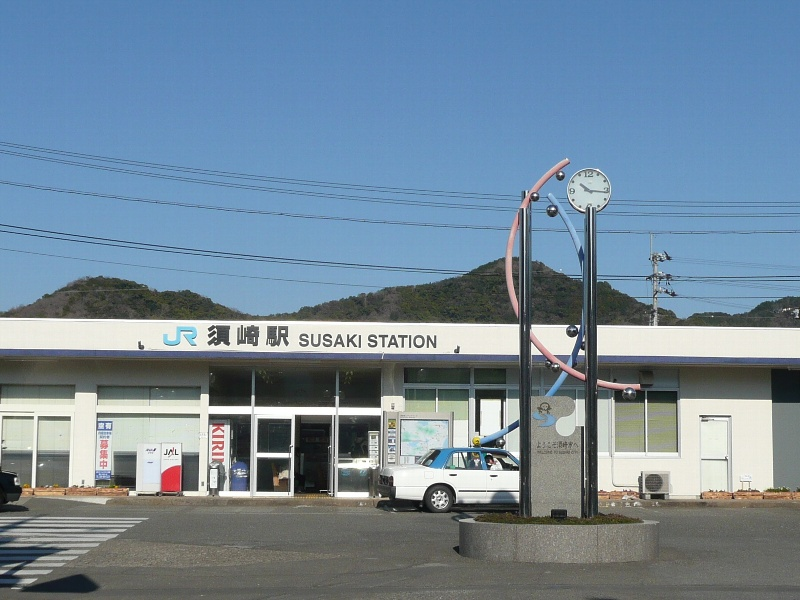
- Susaki Station in 2008

General information
- Location: 1 Chome-10-13 Haramachi, Susaki-shi, Kōchi-ken 785-0001; Japan
- Coordinates: 33°23′34″N 133°17′35″E
- Operator: JR Shikoku
- Line: ■ Dosan Line
- Distance: 168.7 km from Tadotsu
- Platforms: 1 side + 1 island platforms
- Tracks: 3

Construction
- Parking: Available
- Accessible: No - island platform accessed by footbridge

Other information
- Status: Staffed - JR ticket window (Midori no Madoguchi)
- Station code: K19
- Website: Official website

History
- Opened: 30 March 1924

Passengers
- FY2019: 832
Location
- Location within Kochi Prefecture Location within Japan

Susaki Station (須崎駅, Susaki-eki) is a passenger railway station located in the city of Susaki, Kōchi Prefecture, Japan. It is operated by JR Shikoku and has the station number "K19".

== Lines ==
The station is served by JR Shikoku's Dosan Line and is located 168.7 km from the beginning of the line at Tadotsu.

In addition to the local trains of the Dosan Line, the following limited express services also stop at Susaki Station:

- Nanpū - Okayama to Kōchi, Nakamura and Sukumo
- Shimanto - Takamatsu to Kōchi, Nakamura and Sukumo
- Ashizuri - Kōchi to Nakamura and Sukumo

== Layout ==
The station consists of a side platform and an island platform serving three tracks. There are also several passing loops and sidings on either side of the station. A station building houses a waiting room, a JR ticket window (with Midori no Madoguchi facility) as well as a JR Travel Centre (Warp Plaza). Access to the island platform is by means of a footbridge. Car parking and car rental facilities are available at the station.

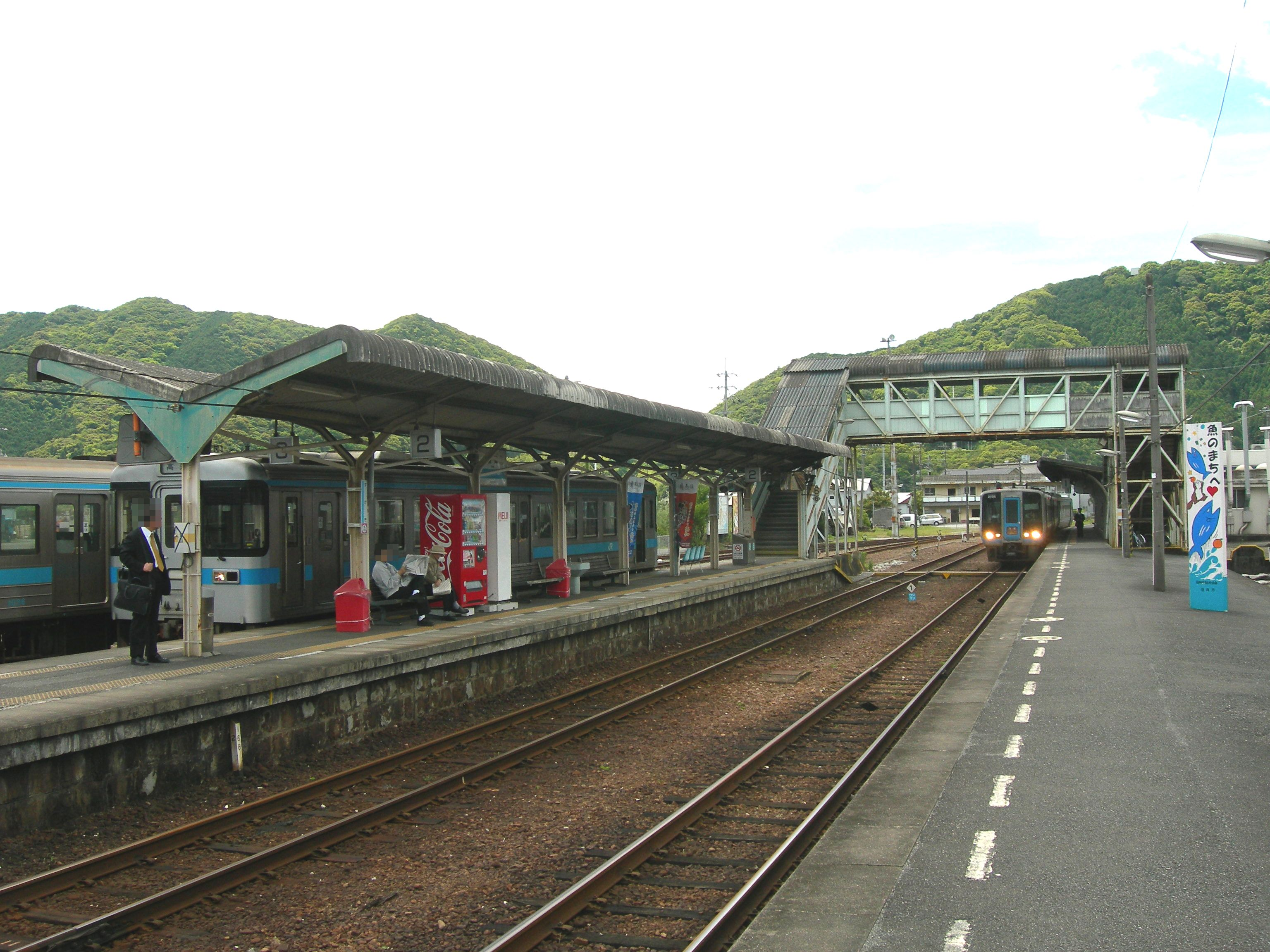
View of the station platforms in 2010 looking in the direction of Kubokawa

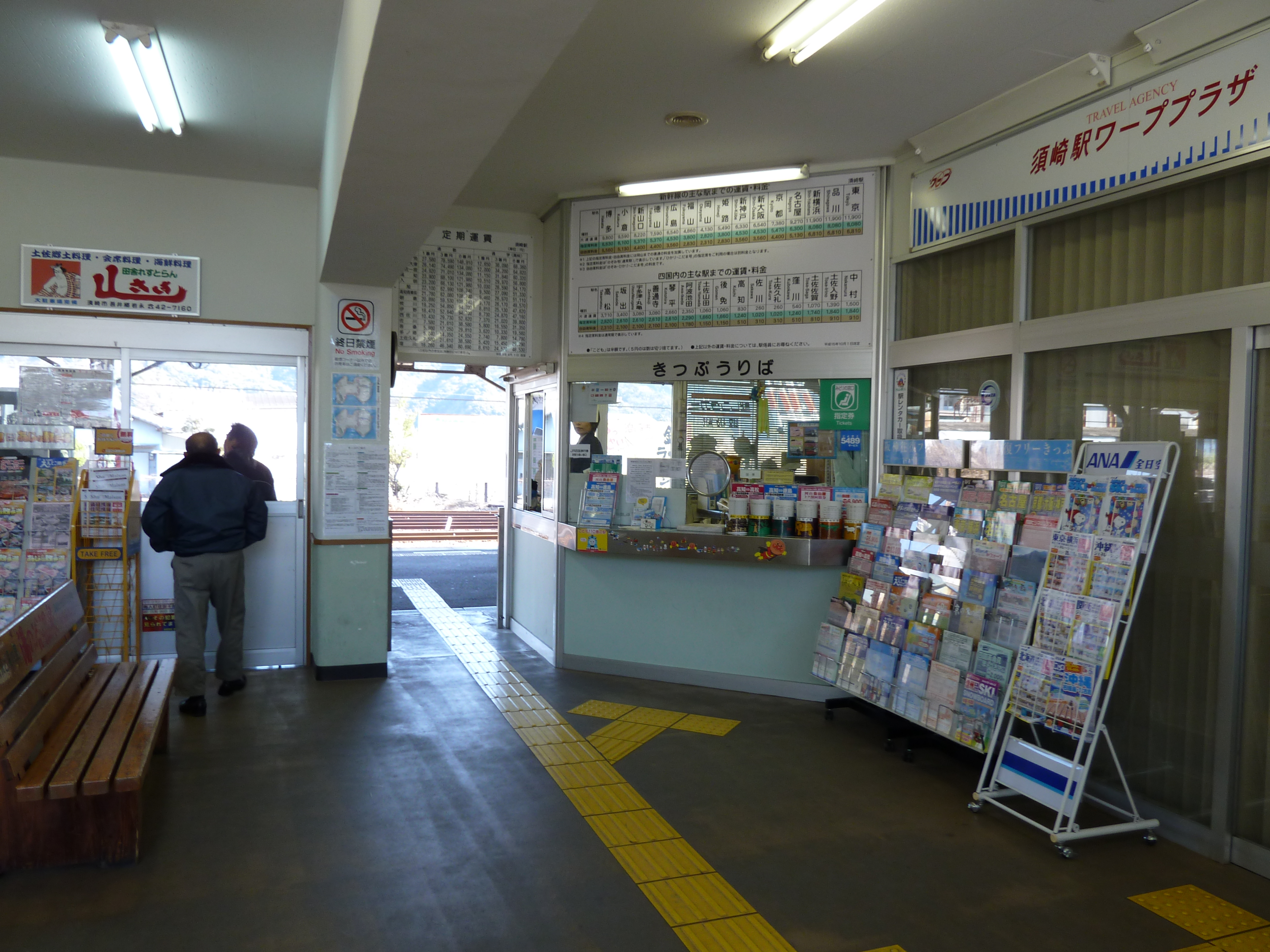
Susaki JR ticket window and Warp Plaza travel centre

== Adjacent stations ==
«	Service	»
JR Limited Express Services
Sakawa	Nanpū	Tosa-Kure
Sakawa	Shimanto	Tosa-Kure
Sakawa	Ashizuri	Tosa-Kure
Dosan Line
Ōma	Local	Tosa-Shinjō

== History ==
The station opened on 30 March 1924 when the then Kōchi Line (later renamed the Dosan Line) was constructed from here eastwards towards Kusaka. At the time of it opening, Susaki was operated Japanese Government Railways, later becoming Japanese National Railways (JNR). With the privatization of JNR on 1 April 1987, control of the station passed to JR Shikoku. A plate on the station building declares that Susaki is "Point Zero" on the Dosan Line, though this is incorrect. Susaki was the first station to be built in Kōchi Prefecture but Tadotsu in Kagawa Prefecture was built in 1899 and the stretch of track from there to Sanuki-Saida was completed by 1923 and this would later also be part of the Dosan Line.

== Surrounding area ==
- Susaki City Civic Cultural Center
- Susaki Municipal Susaki Elementary School
- Kochi District Court Susaki Branch

== See also ==
- List of railway stations in Japan
