= Awa-Kawaguchi Station =

Railway station in Miyoshi, Tokushima Prefecture, Japan

Awa-Kawaguchi Station 阿波川口駅
- Awa-Kawaguchi Station

General information
- Location: Ōkawamochi, Yamashirochō, Miyoshi City, Tokushima Prefecture 779-5304; Japan
- Coordinates: 33°57′50″N 133°45′17″E
- Operator: JR Shikoku
- Line: Dosan Line
- Distance: 55.1 km (34.2 mi) from Tadotsu
- Platforms: 2 side platforms
- Tracks: 2

Construction
- Structure type: At grade
- Parking: Available
- Accessible: No - footbridge needed to access one of the platforms

Other information
- Status: Kan'i itaku station
- Station code: D25

History
- Opened: 28 November 1935; 90 years ago

Passengers
- FY2019: 32

Services
Preceding station	JR Shikoku	Following station
Koboke towards Kubokawa	Dosan Line	Iyaguchi towards Tadotsu
Location
- Location within Tokushima Prefecture Location within Japan

Awa-Kawaguchi Station (阿波川口駅, Awa-Kawaguchi-eki) is a passenger railway station located in the city of Miyoshi, Tokushima Prefecture, Japan. It is operated by JR Shikoku and has the station number "D25".

== Lines ==
The station is served by JR Shikoku's Dosan Line and is located 55.1 km from the beginning of the line at Tadotsu.

== Layout ==
The station consists of two side platforms serving two tracks. A footbridge connects the two platforms. The station building has a waiting room and a kan'i itaku ticket window.

=== Platforms ===
1	■ Dosan Line	for Awa-Ikeda and Kotohira
2	■ Dosan Line	for Ōboke and Kōchi

== History ==
The station opened on 28 November 1935 when the then Kōchi Line was extended northwards from Toyonaga to Minawa and the line was renamed the Dosan Line. At this time the station was operated by Japanese Government Railways, later becoming Japanese National Railways (JNR). With the privatization of JNR on 1 April 1987, control of the station passed to JR Shikoku.

== Passenger statistics ==
In fiscal 2019, the station was used by an average of 32 passengers daily.

== Surrounding area ==
- Yoshino River
- Japan National Route 32
- Miyoshi City Chamber of Commerce
- Miyoshi City Yamashiro General Branch

== See also ==
- List of railway stations in Japan
