= Higashi-Naruo Station =

Railway station in Nishinomiya, Hyōgo Prefecture, Japan

Higashi-Naruo Station 東鳴尾駅
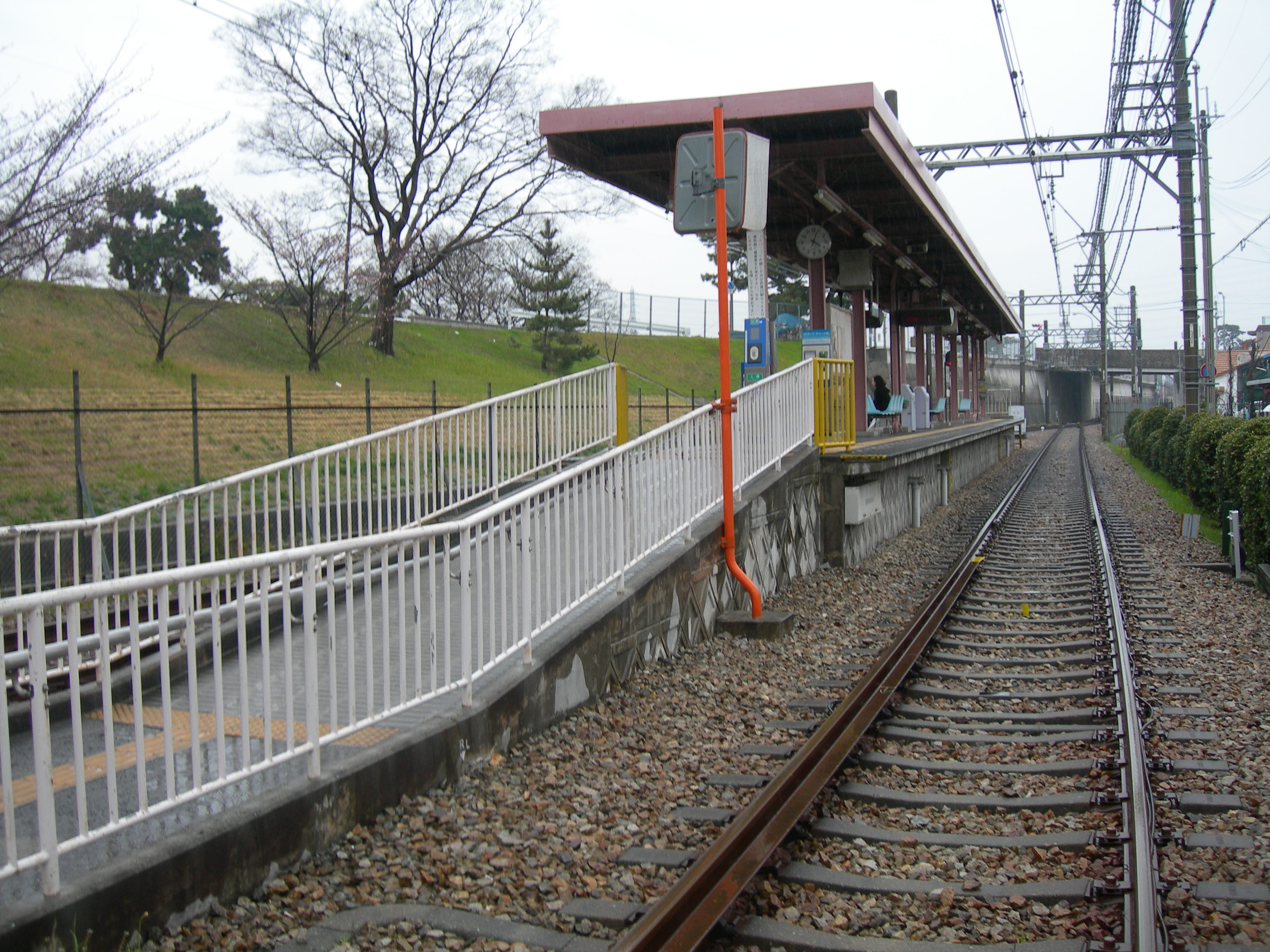
- Higashi-Naruo Station in March 2008

General information
- Location: Higashinaruo-cho 1-chōme, Nishinomiya-shi, Hyōgo-ken 663-8132; Japan
- Coordinates: 34°42′45.22″N 135°22′44.82″E
- Operator: Hanshin Electric Railway
- Line: ■ Mukogawa Line
- Distance: 0.7 km (0.43 miles) from Mukogawa
- Platforms: 1 island platform
- Connections: Bus stop

Other information
- Station code: HS 53
- Website: Official website

History
- Opened: November 21, 1943

Passengers
- 2019: 1,066 (daily)

Services
Preceding station	Hanshin	Following station
Mukogawa Terminus	Mukogawa Line	Suzaki towards Mukogawadanchi-Mae
Location
- Location within Hyōgo Prefecture Location within Japan

Higashi-Naruo Station (東鳴尾駅, Higashi-Naruo-eki; station number: HS-53) is a passenger railway station located in the city of Nishinomiya Hyōgo Prefecture, Japan. It is operated by the private transportation company Hanshin Electric Railway.

== Lines ==
Higashi-Naruo Station is served by the Hanshin Mukogawa Line, and is located 0.7 kilometers from the terminus of the line at Mukogawa.

== Layout ==
The station consists of a single unnumbered ground-level island platform. The station has no station building and is unattended.

=== Platforms ===
west	■ Mukogawa Line	for Mukogawa
east	■ Mukogawa Line	for Mukogawadanchimae

== History ==
Higashi-Naruo Station opened on the Hanshin Mukogawa Line on 21 November 1943 with the opening of the Mukogawa Line.It was out of operation from 5 January 1946 to 10 October 1948.

== Passenger statistics ==
In fiscal 2019, the station was used by an average of 1,066 passengers daily

== Surrounding area ==
- Nishinomiya Municipal Naruo Higashi Elementary School
- Naruo East Public Hall

== See also ==
- List of railway stations in Japan
