= Koboke Station =

Railway station in Miyoshi, Tokushima Prefecture, Japan

Koboke Station 小歩危駅
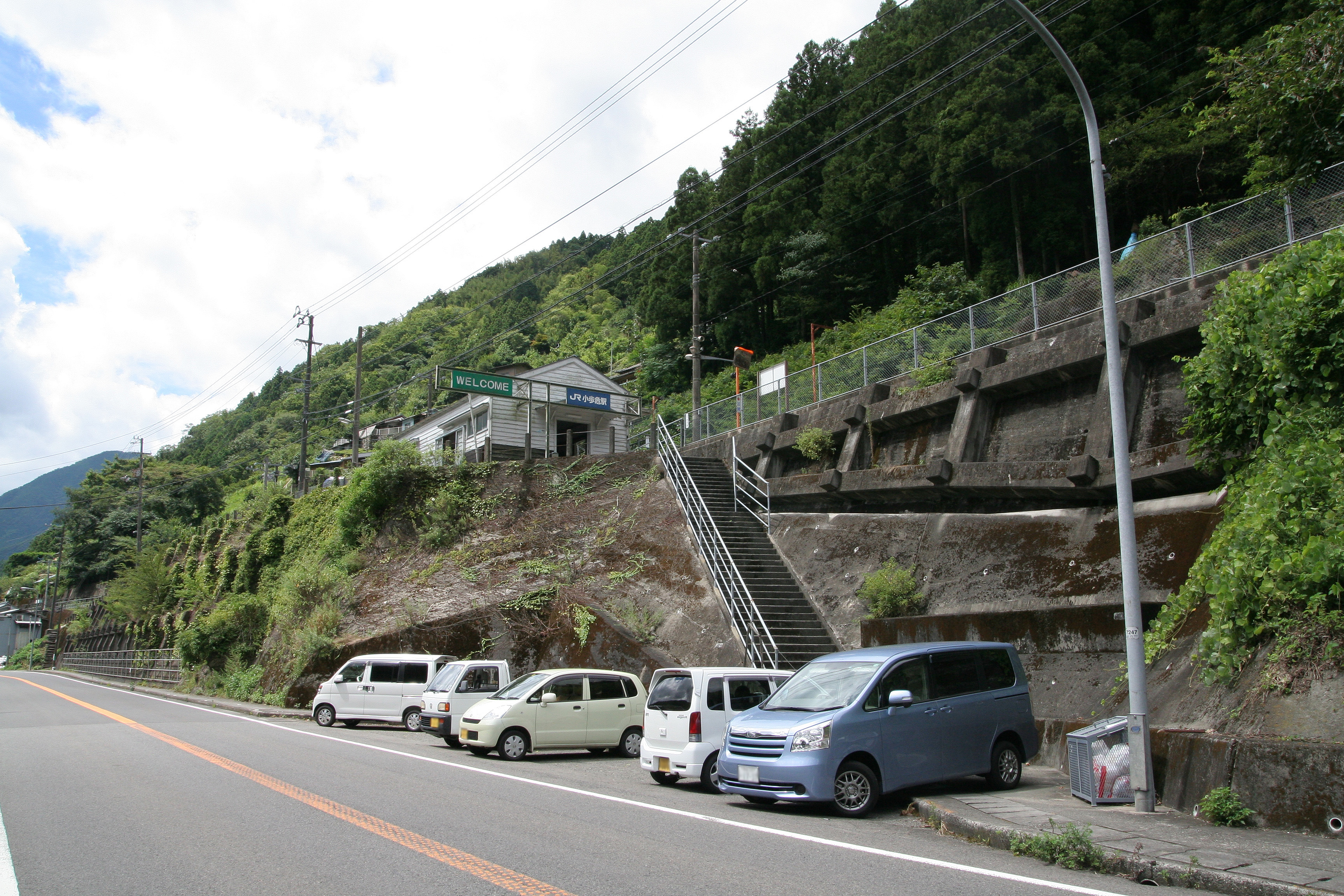
- Koboke Station as seen from National Route 32

General information
- Location: Yamashirochō Ōkawamochi, Miyoshi City, Tokushima Prefecture 779-5304; Japan
- Coordinates: 33°55′23″N 133°45′32″E
- Operator: JR Shikoku
- Line: Dosan Line
- Distance: 59.8 km (37.2 mi) from Tadotsu
- Platforms: 2 side platforms
- Tracks: 2

Construction
- Structure type: At grade
- Parking: Available
- Accessible: No - steps lead up to platform from access road

Other information
- Status: unstaffed
- Station code: D25

History
- Opened: 28 November 1935; 90 years ago
- Former names: Nishue (until 1950)

Passengers
- FY2019: 12

Services
Preceding station	JR Shikoku	Following station
Ōboke towards Kubokawa	Dosan Line	Awa-Kawaguchi towards Tadotsu
Location
- Location within Tokushima Prefecture Location within Japan

Koboke Station (小歩危駅, Koboke-eki) is a passenger railway station located in the city of Miyoshi, Tokushima Prefecture, Japan. It is operated by JR Shikoku and has the station number "D26".

== Lines ==
Koboke Station is served by JR Shikoku's Dosan Line and is located 59.8 km from the beginning of the line at Tadotsu.

== Layout ==
The station, which is unstaffed, consists of two side platforms serving two tracks on a side hill cutting. From the main road (National Route 32, a flight of steps leads up to a small building which serves as a waiting room. Another short flight of steps leads up to one platform and a pedestrian level crossing is used to access the other platform. A small parking area is provided at the side of the main road.

=== Platforms ===
1	■ Dosan Line	for Ōboke and Kōchi
2	■ Dosan Line	for Awa-Ikeda, and Kotohira

== History ==
Koboke Station opened on 28 November 1935 when the then Kōchi Line was extended northwards from Toyonaga to Minawa and the line was renamed the Dosan Line. At this time the station was named Nishiu Station (西宇駅) and was operated by Japanese Government Railways, later becoming Japanese National Railways (JNR). On 1 October 1950, the station was renamed Koboke Station.

With the privatization of JNR on 1 April 1987, control of the station passed to JR Shikoku.

== Surrounding area ==
- National Route 32
- Koboke Gorge

== See also ==
- List of railway stations in Japan
