= Suzaki Station =

Railway station in Nishinomiya, Hyōgo Prefecture, Japan

Suzaki Station 洲先駅
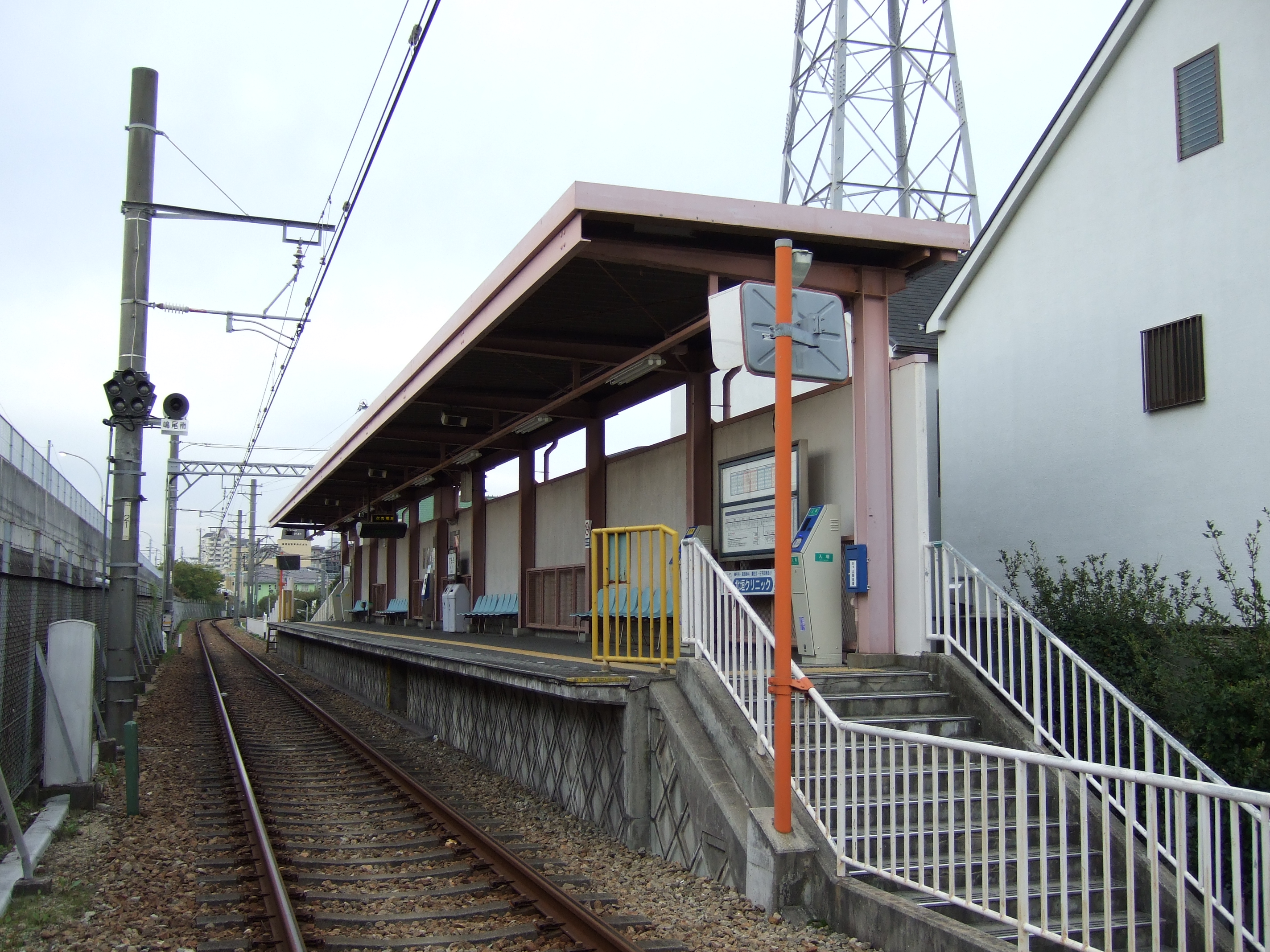
- Suzaki Station in November 2008

General information
- Location: Higashinaruo-chō 2-chōme, Nishinomiya-shi, Hyōgo-ken 663-8132; Japan
- Coordinates: 34°42′32″N 135°22′41″E
- Operator: Hanshin Electric Railway
- Line: ■ Mukogawa Line
- Distance: 1.1 km (0.68 miles) from Mukogawa
- Platforms: 1 side platform

Other information
- Station code: HS 52
- Website: Official website

History
- Opened: November 21, 1943

Passengers
- 2019: 970 (daily)

Services
Preceding station	Hanshin	Following station
Higashi-Naruo towards Mukogawa	Mukogawa Line	Mukogawadanchi-Mae Terminus
Location
- Location within Hyōgo Prefecture Location within Japan

Suzaki Station (洲先駅, Suzaki-eki; station number: HS-52) is a passenger railway station located in the city of Nishinomiya Hyōgo Prefecture, Japan. It is operated by the private transportation company Hanshin Electric Railway.

== Lines ==
Suzaki Station is served by the Hanshin Mukogawa Line, and is located 1.1 kilometers from the terminus of the line at Mukogawa.

== Layout ==
The station consists of a single ground-level side platform serving one bi-directional track. The station has no station building and is unattended.

== History ==
Suzaki Station opened on the Hanshin Mukogawa Line on 21 November 1943 with the opening of the Mukogawa Line. It was out of operation from 5 January 1946 to 10 October 1948.

== Passenger statistics ==
In fiscal 2019, the station was used by an average of 970 passengers daily

== Surrounding area ==
The station is located in a residential area.

== See also ==
- List of railway stations in Japan
