= Iyonada Monogatari =

Japanese limited express train service

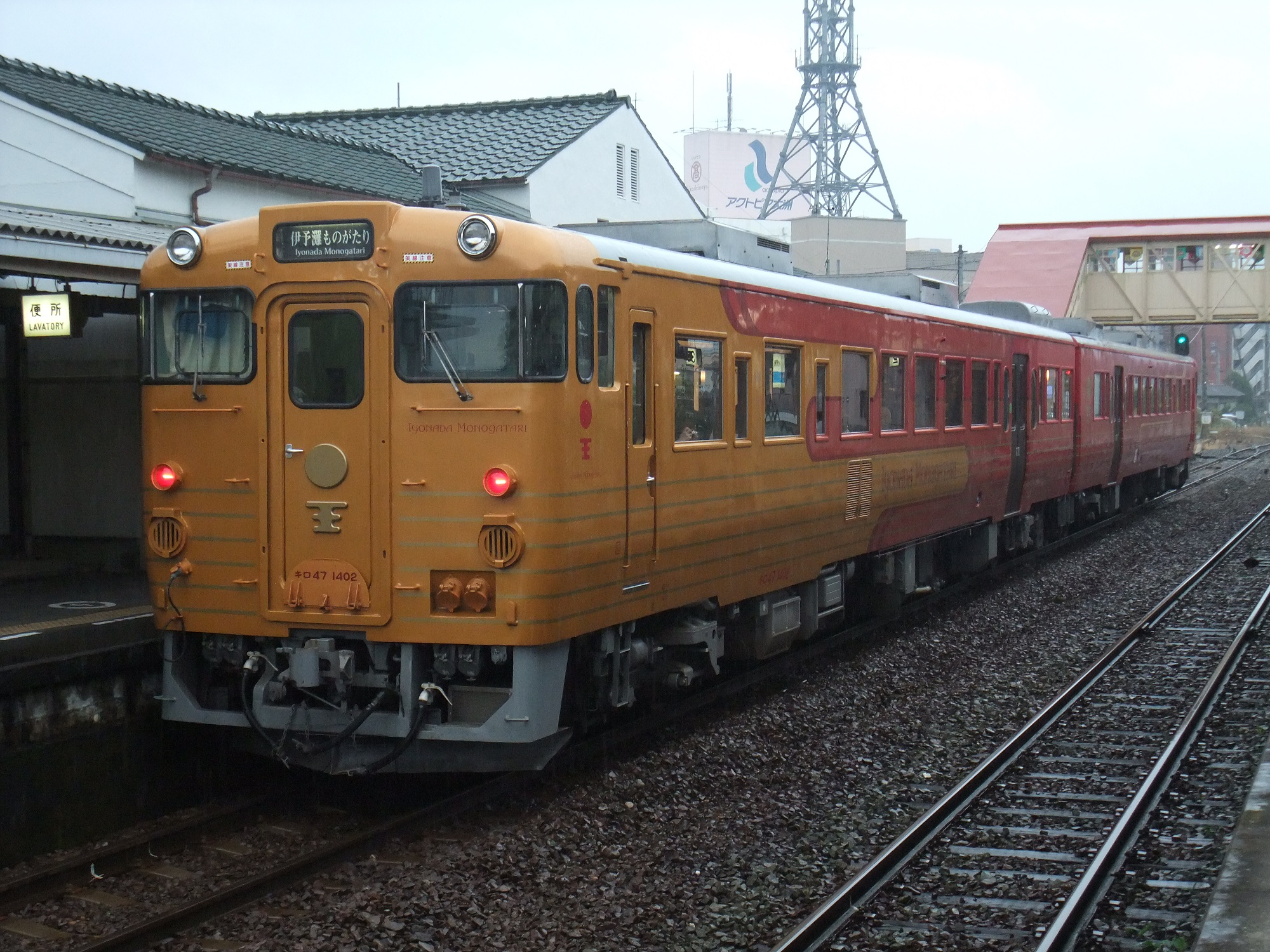
- Iyonada Monogatari (First Generation) in December 2014

Overview
- Service type: Limited express
- Status: Operational
- Locale: Shikoku, Japan
- First service: 26 July 2014
- Current operator: JR Shikoku

Route
- Termini: Matsuyama; Iyo-Ōzu, Yawatahama
- Line used: Yosan Line

Technical
- Rolling stock: KiHa 185 series DMU
- Track gauge: 1,067 mm (3 ft 6 in)
- Electrification: 1,500 V DC overhead (Matsuyama to Iyo-shi), Diesel (Iyo-shi to Yawatahama)

The Iyonada Monogatari (伊予灘ものがたり, Iyonada monogatari) is a limited express sightseeing train service operated by JR Shikoku in Shikoku, Japan, since July 2014.

== Overview ==
The Iyonada Monogatari is the first sightseeing train in Shikoku, and it started operations on July 26, 2014. The name of the train means "Story of the Iyonada Sea". Iyo is the old name for Ehime Prefecture.

The train runs along Ehime's coastline overlooking the Iyonada Sea, located in the western portion of the Seto Inland Sea. Its train cars interiors are decorated with a retro theming. In-train dining services using local ingredients are available.

== Operation status ==
Between its inception in 2014 and 2021, the Iyonada Monogatari ran as a local express train. From April 2022 onward, the trains run as a limited express service, requiring reservations in advance.

As of 2024, the train service operates mostly on weekends and holidays, with four different service patterns. The train runs between Matsuyama and Iyo-Ōzu, and also between Matsuyama and Yawatahama. Each service pattern is named:

- Ōzu-hen (Episode Ōzu): Matsuyama to Iyo-Ōzu (morning)
- Futami-hen (Episode Futami): Iyo-Ōzu to Matsuyama (midday)
- Yawatahama-hen (Episode Yawatahama): Matsuyama to Yawatahama (afternoon)
- Dōgo-hen (Episode Dōgo): Yawatahama to Matsuyama (evening)

The train makes a brief stop at Shimonada Station on all routes, allowing for passengers to take photographs.

== Rolling stock ==
The first generation of rolling stock (KiHa 40 series) was used for the service from 2014 to 2021. The cars retired at the end of 2021, and were replaced by the second generation of KiHa 185 series cars in April 2022.

First Generation

The first generation of rolling stock for the Iyonada Monogatari consisted of a 2-car KiHa 47 (KiRo 47) DMU. Originally retired in March 2011, the unit was refitted specifically for this service.

The theming of the train cars was designed by Tetsuya Matsuoka, a JR Shikoku employee. The first car (Akane Chapter) used a red color scheme to reflect the sunset colors of the Iyo seaside and rose madder. The second car (Golden Chapter) used a gold and orange color scheme to reflect the colors of the sun and citrus fruits of Ehime.

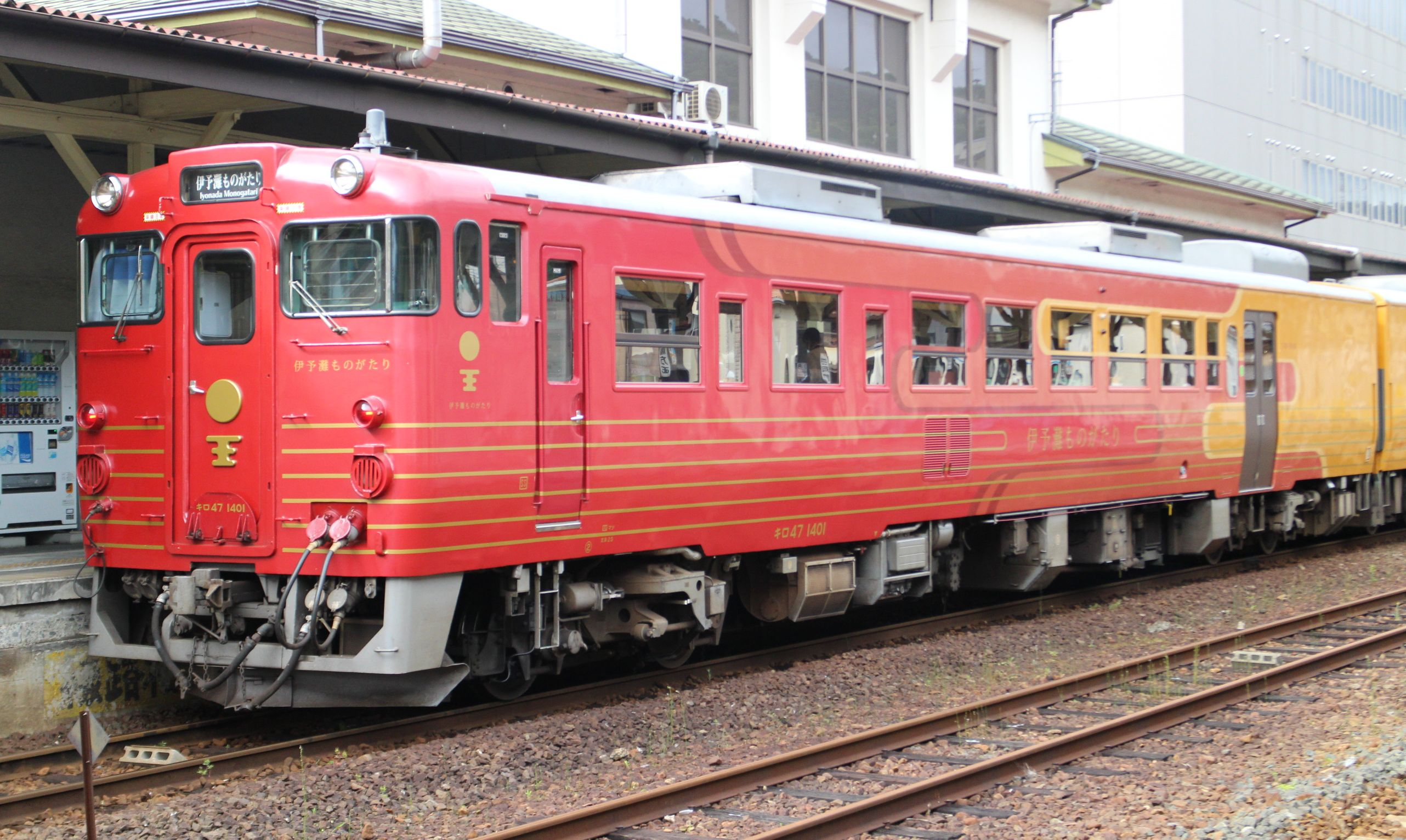
KiRo 47 1401/KiHa 47 501 (Akane Chapter)

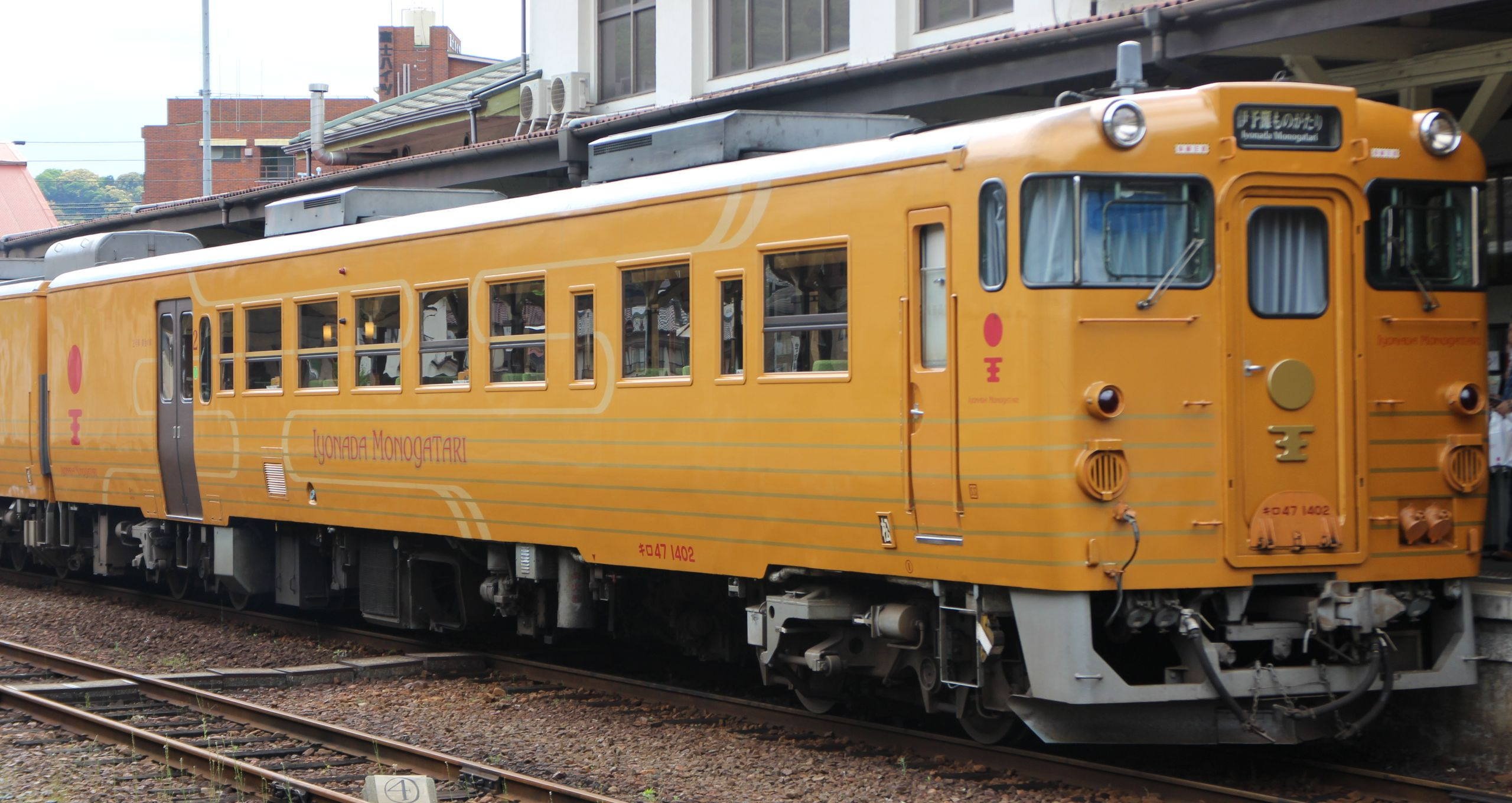
KiRo 47 1402/KiHa 47 1501 (Golden Chapter)

After retirement, the two cars were put on display at the Kyoto Railway Museum between January 21, 2022 and March 22, 2022. The cars were then scrapped on June 30, 2022.

Second Generation

The KiHa 47 cars made their final run in December 2021, and were replaced by a 3-car KiHa 185 series DMU in April 2022. The train interiors were updated, with the first two cars largely retaining the style and ambience of the first generation, and the third car being a limited private compartment.

== Gallery ==
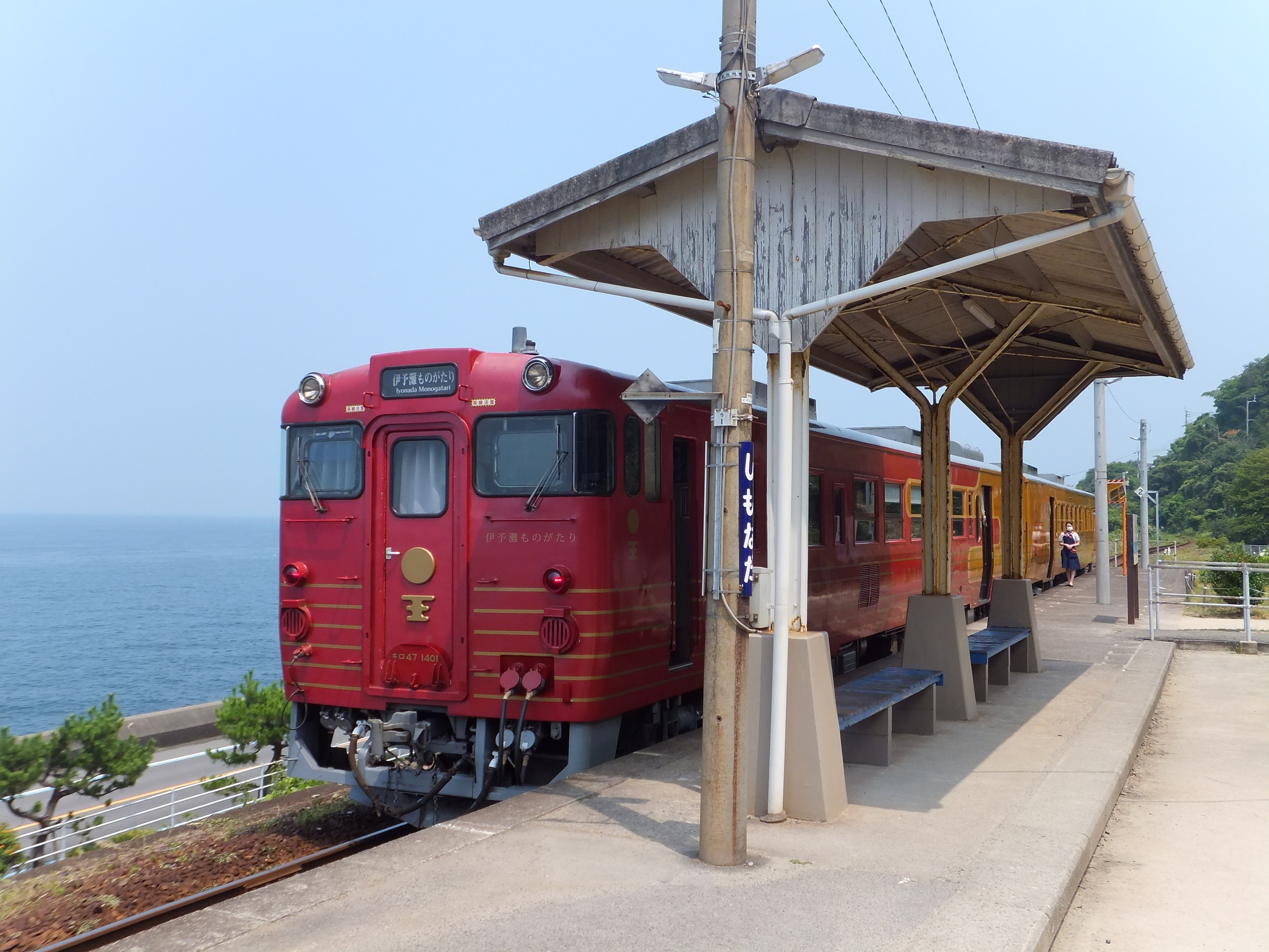
Iyonada Monogatari (First Generation) at Shimonada Station in 2020

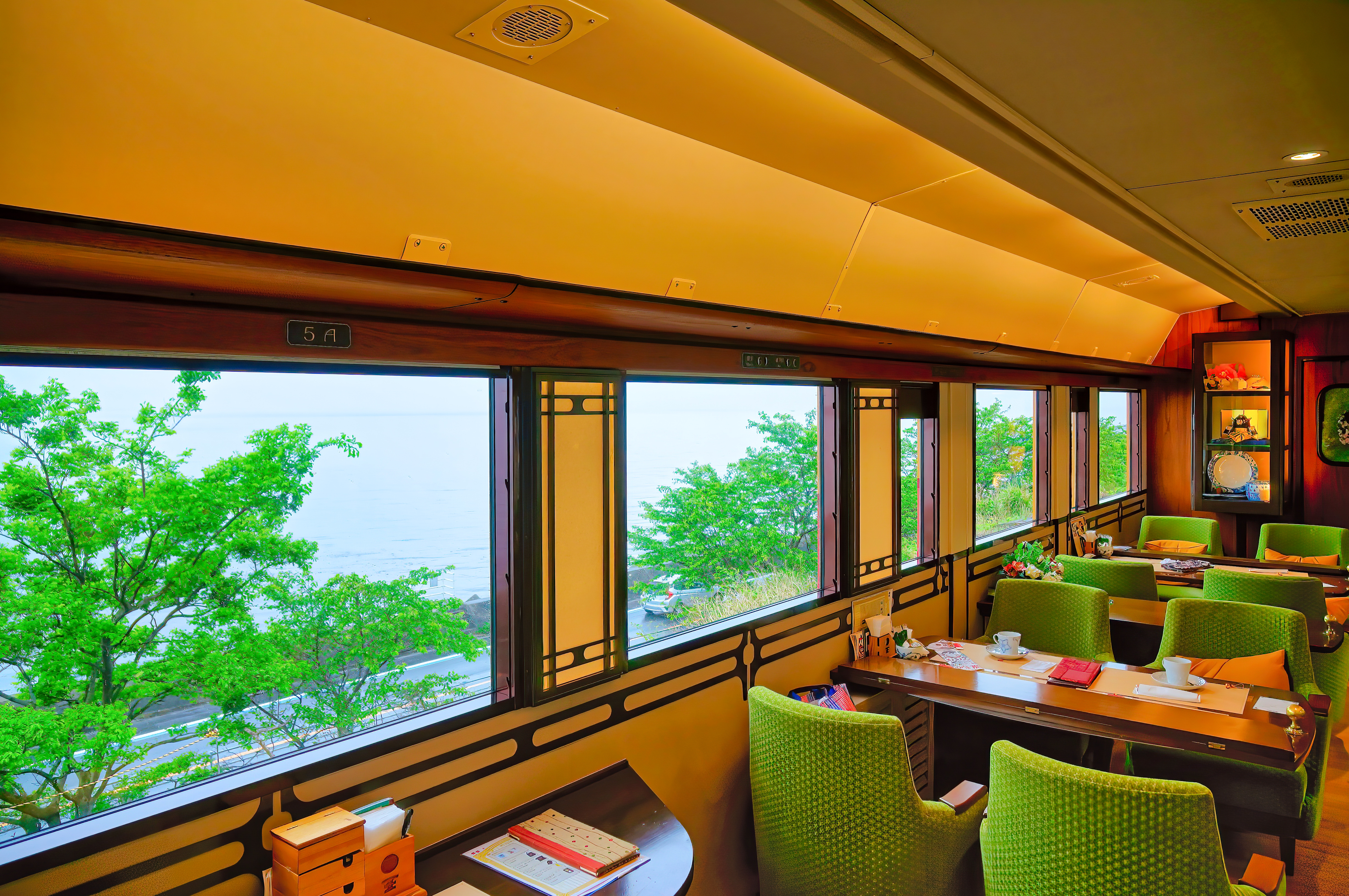
Interior of second car (First Generation)

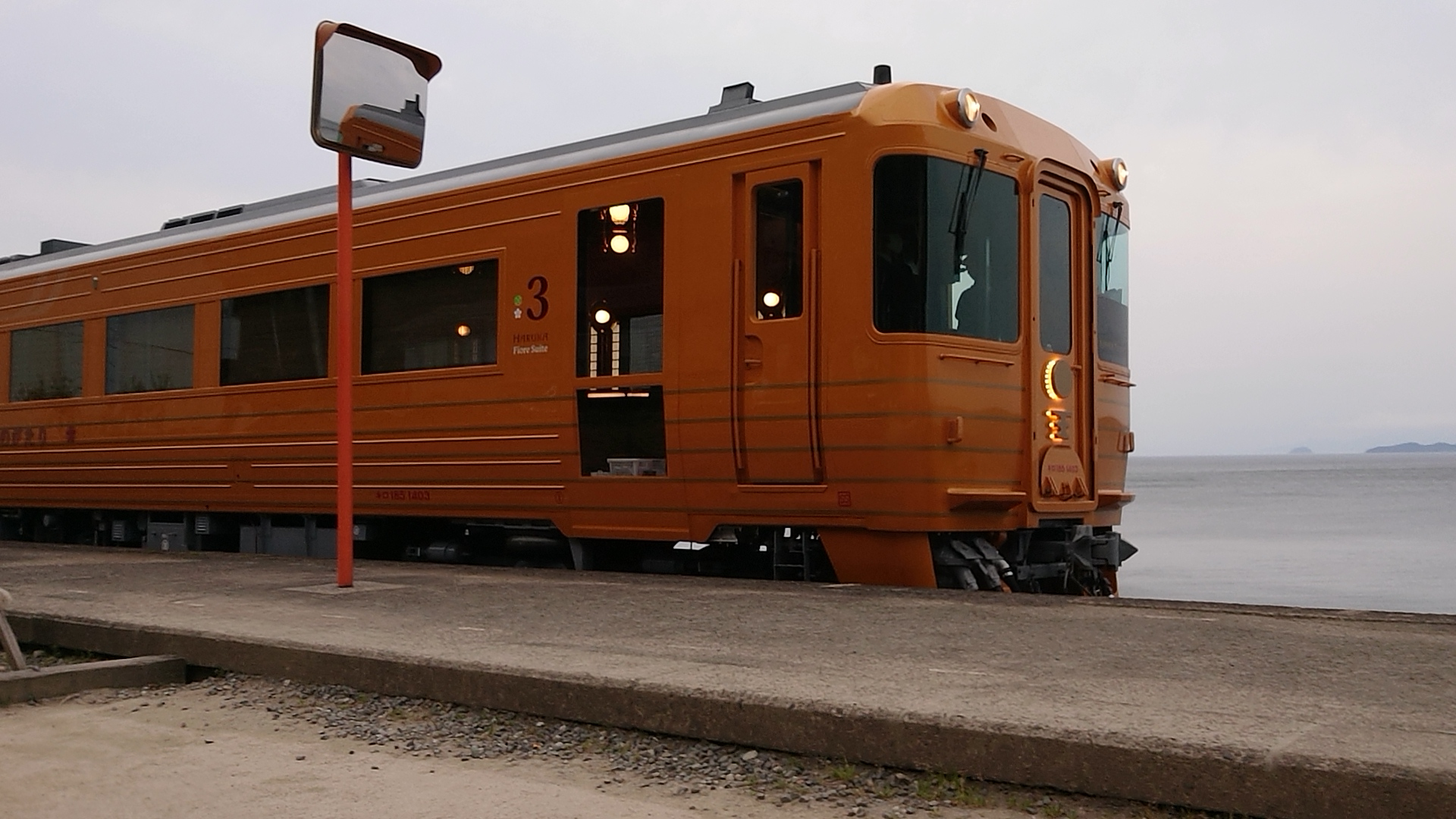
Iyonada Monogatari (Second Generation)

== See also ==
- Joyful Train
