= Hanshin Mukogawa Line =

Railway line in Hyōgo Prefecture, Japan

Mukogawa Line
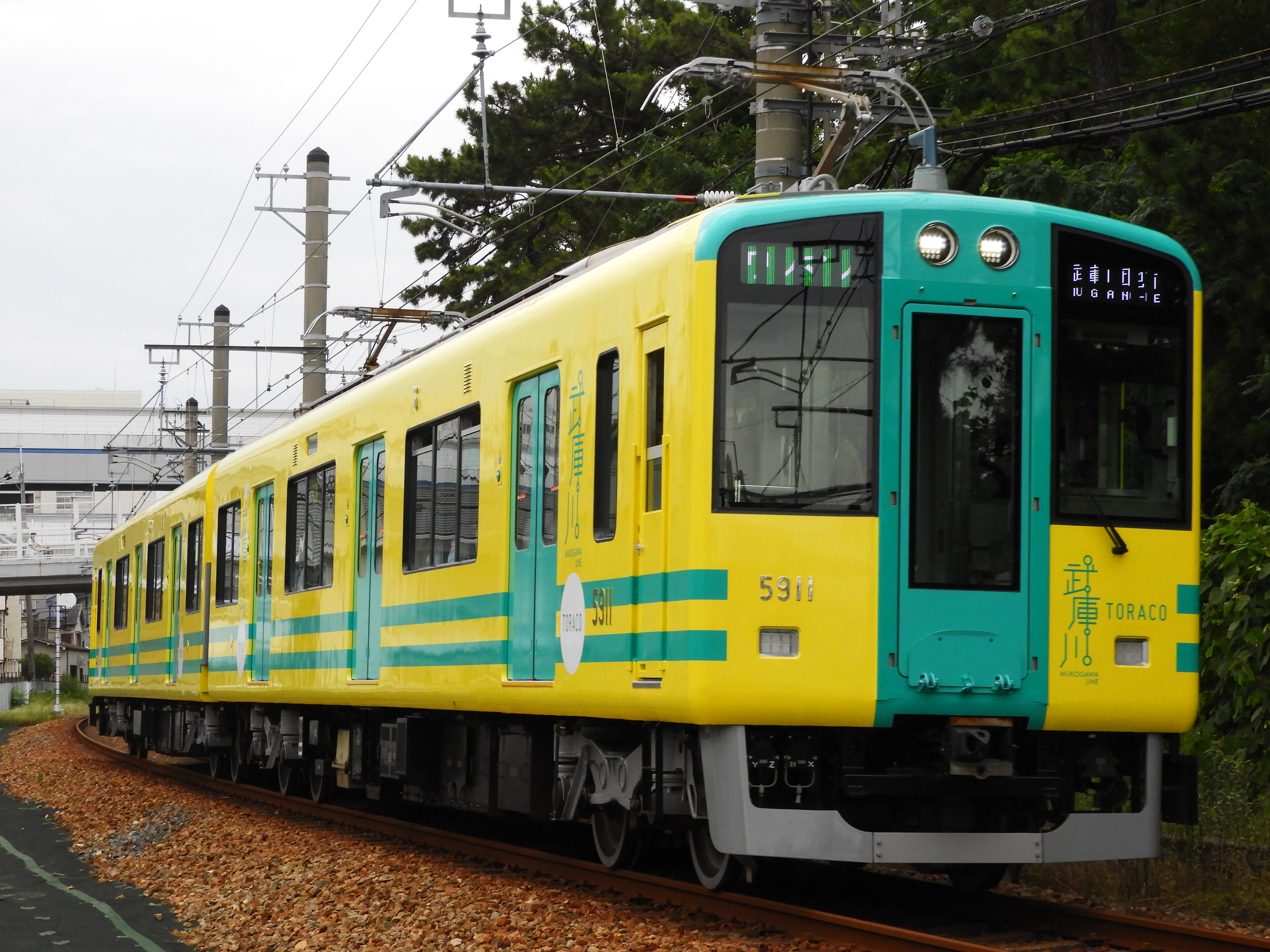
- A 5500 series strain

Overview
- Native name: 武庫川線
- Locale: Nishinomiya, Hyogo Prefecture, Japan
- Stations: 4

Service
- Rolling stock: Hanshin 5500 series

History
- Opened: 21 November 1943; 82 years ago

Technical
- Line length: 1.7 km (1.1 mi)
- Number of tracks: Single track
- Track gauge: 1,435 mm (4 ft 8 1/2 in) standard gauge
- Electrification: 1,500 V DC, overhead lines
- Operating speed: 45 km/h (28 mph)

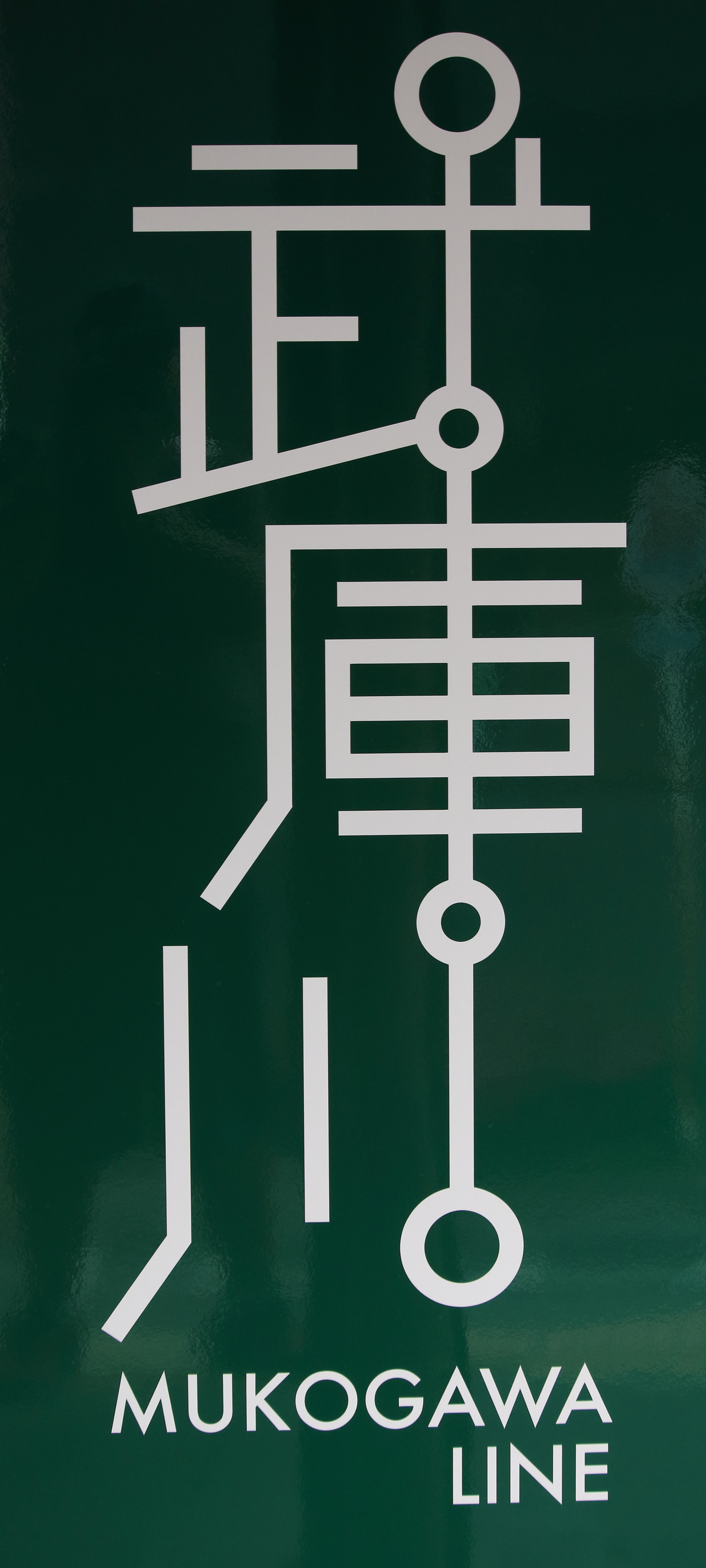
Art Deco logo of Hanshin Mukogawa Line.

The Mukogawa Line (武庫川線, Mukogawa-sen) is a branch line of the Hanshin Electric Railway Main Line in Nishinomiya, Hyōgo Prefecture, Japan with no through service. The line is single-tracked, but is double-tracked at all stations except Suzaki Station. The route follows the western edge of the Mukogawa River from the Hanshin Main Line to the river's former mouth at Mukogawadanchimae Station. Since 6 June 2020, the line has been operated by a fleet of 5500 series two-car sets, which have replaced the fleet of 7861 series sets that were used on the line previously.

== Stations ==
No.	Station		Connections	Location
HS 12	Mukogawa	武庫川	Hanshin Main Line	Nishinomiya
HS 53	Higashi-Naruo	東鳴尾		Nishinomiya
HS 52	Suzaki	洲先		Nishinomiya
HS 51	Mukogawadanchimae	武庫川団地前		Nishinomiya

== Gallery ==
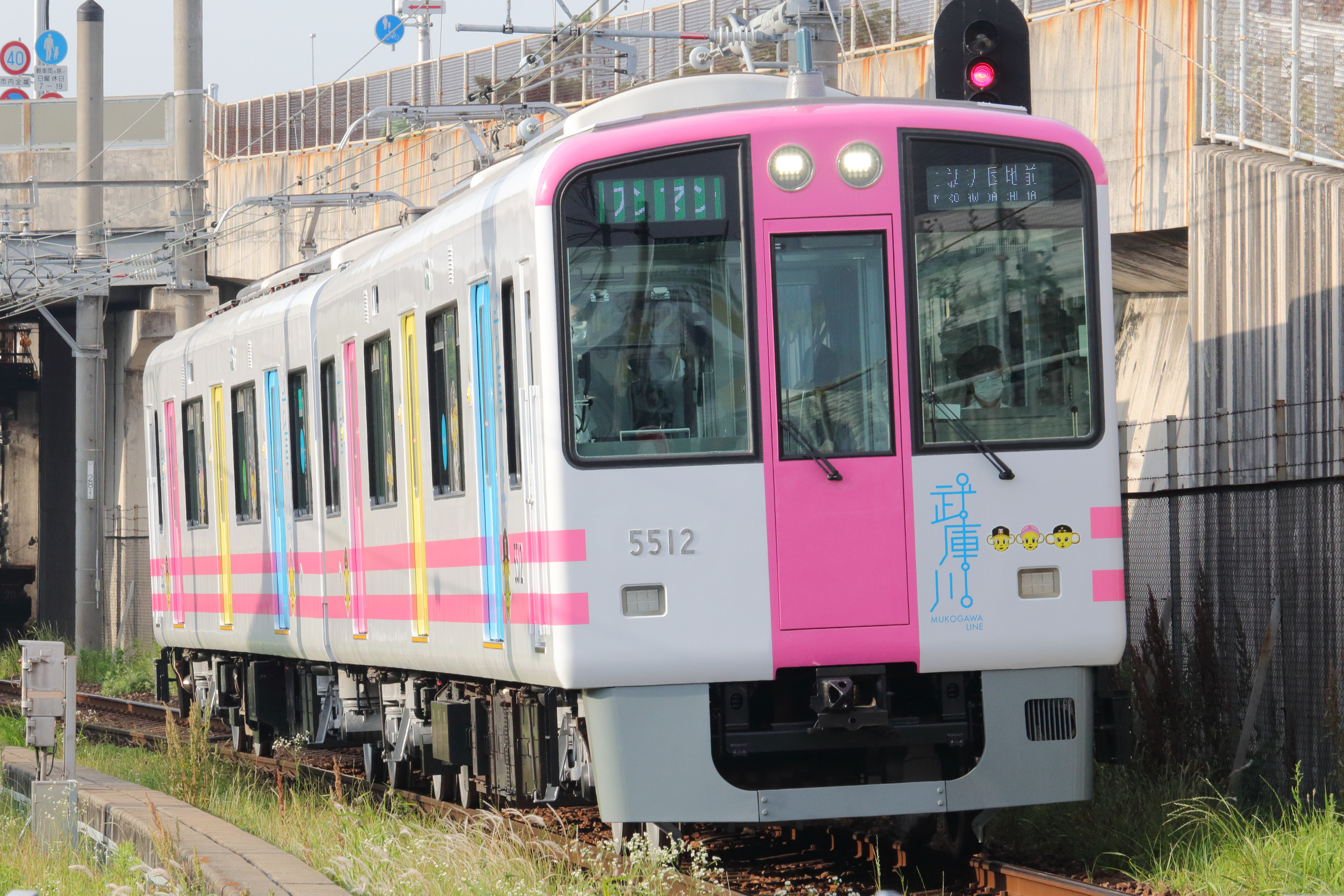
Series 5500
To-lucky 5511F-5912F

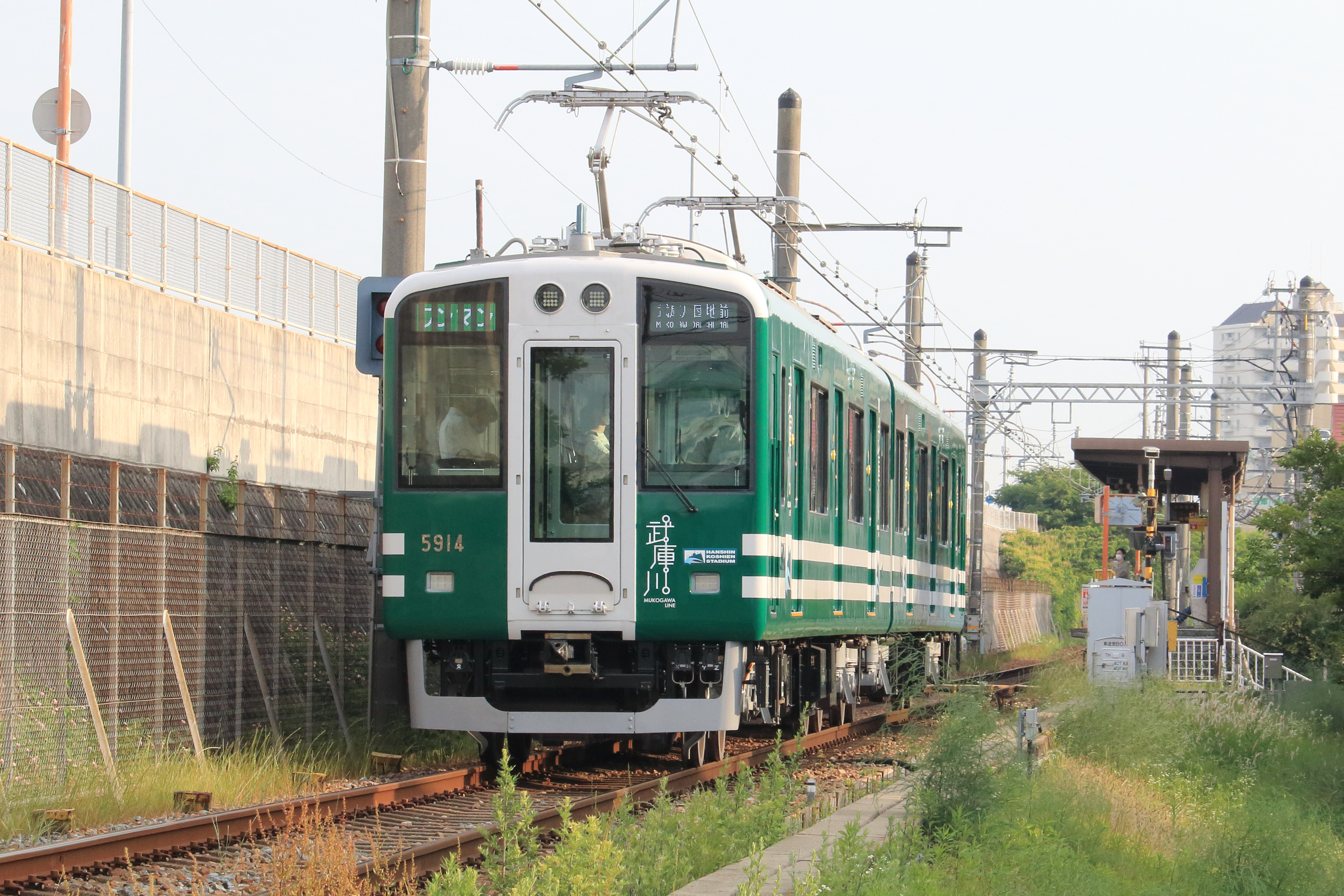
Series 5500
Koshien 5514-5914F

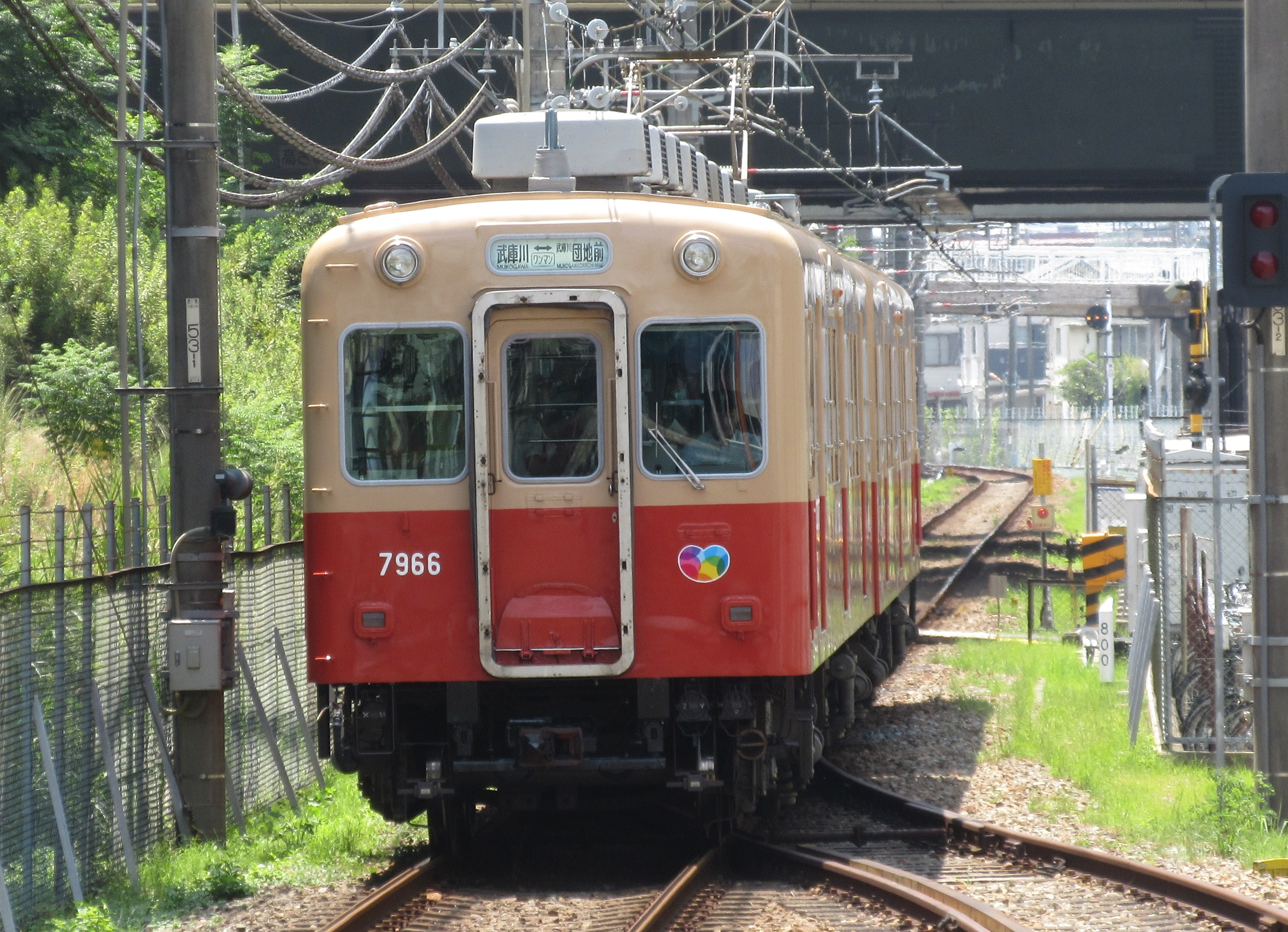
Series 7961
(Retirement)

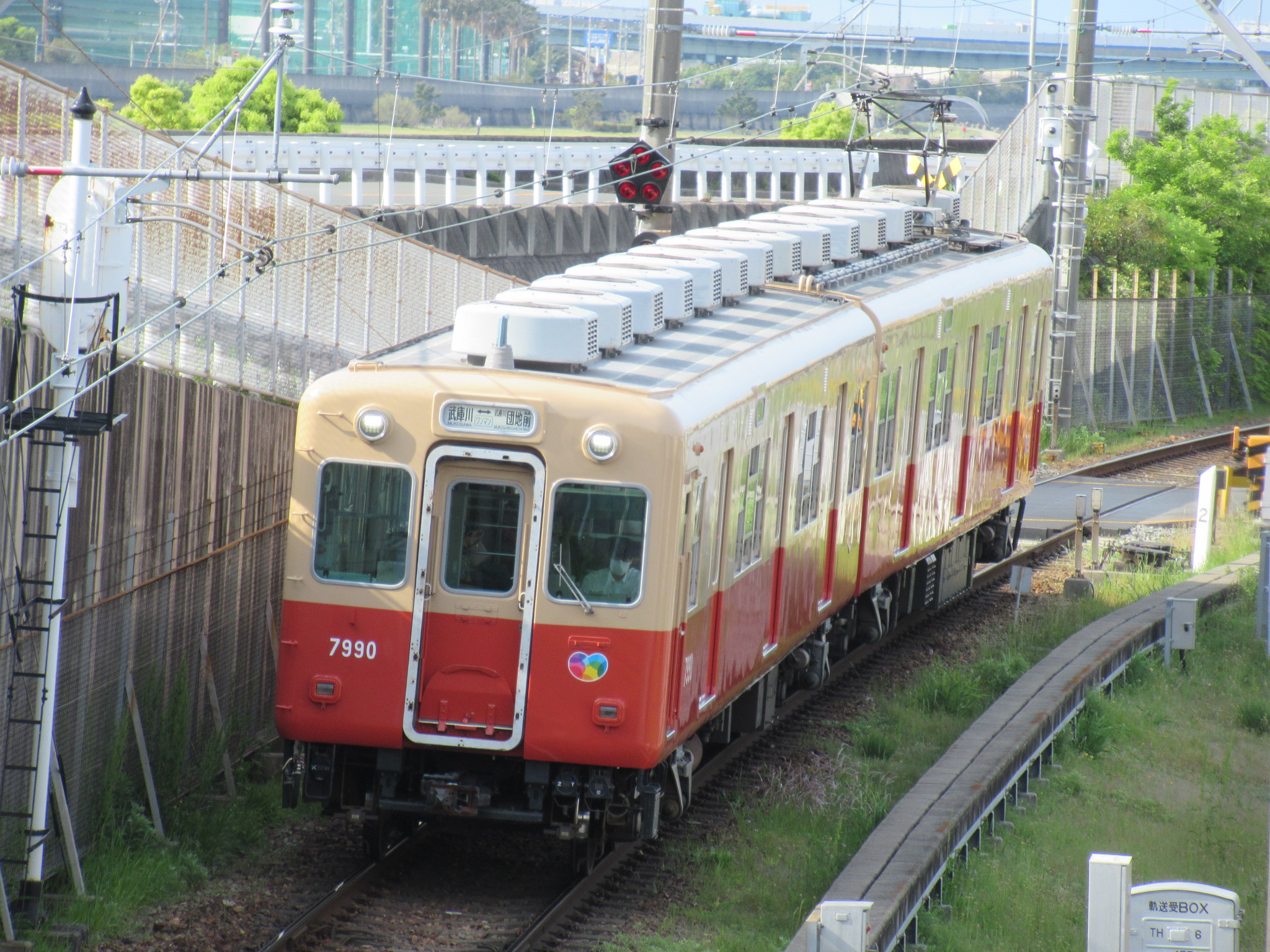
Series 7890-7990
(Retirement)
