= Naruo - Mukogawajoshidai-Mae Station =

Railway station in Nishinomiya, Hyōgo Prefecture, Japan

Naruo・Mukogawajoshidai-Mae Station 鳴尾・武庫川女子大前駅
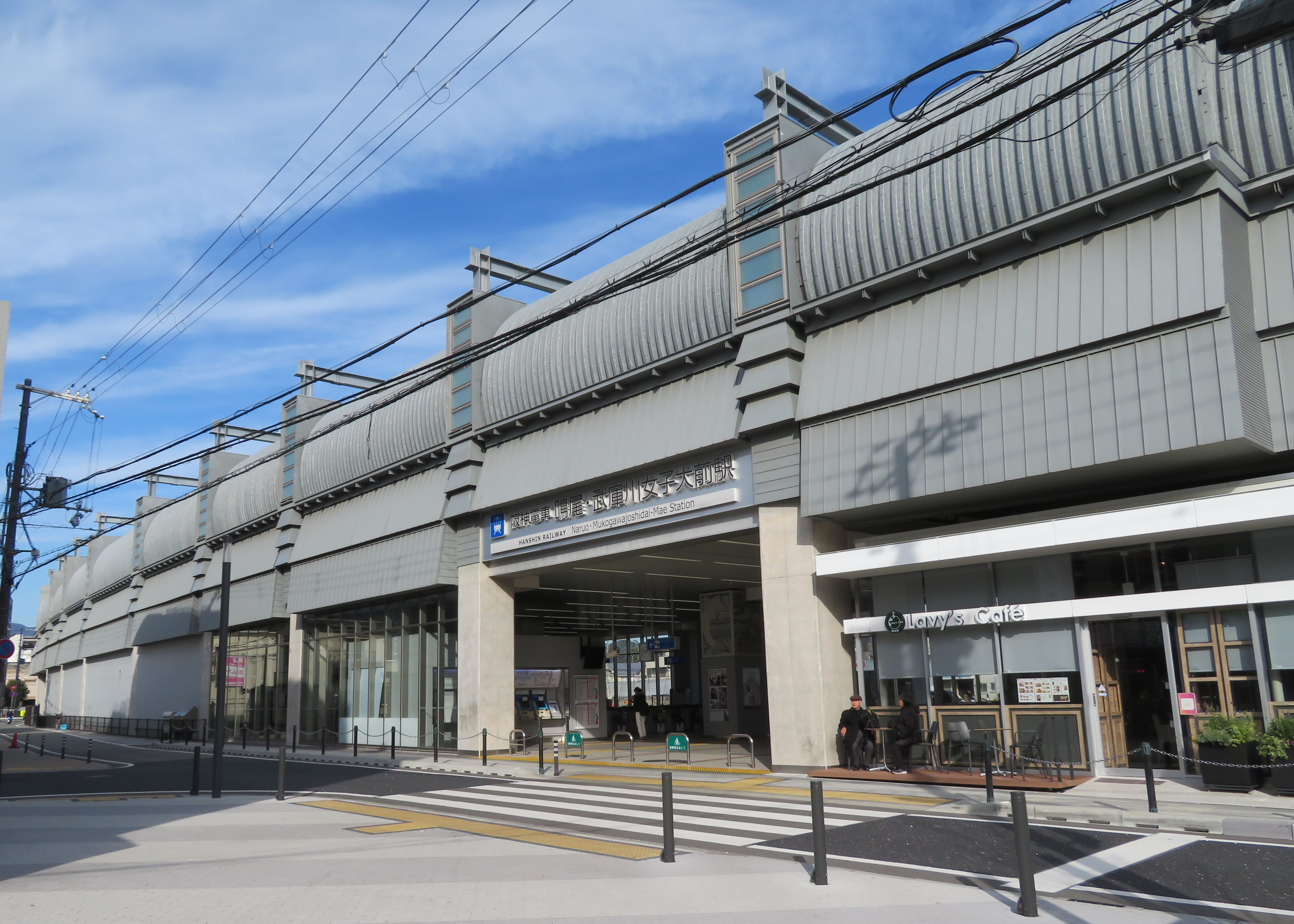
- Naruo･Mukogawajoshidai-Mae Station

General information
- Location: Satonaka-cho 3-chome, Nishinomiya-shi, Hyōgo-ken 663-8183; Japan
- Coordinates: 34°43′11″N 135°22′13″E
- Operator: Hanshin Electric Railway
- Line: ■ Hanshin Main Line
- Distance: 13.2 km (8.2 miles) from Umeda
- Platforms: 2 side platforms
- Tracks: 2
- Connections: Bus stop

Other information
- Status: Staffed
- Station code: HS 13
- Website: Official website

History
- Opened: 12 April 1905
- Former names: Naruo (to 2019)

Passengers
- 2019: 12,510 (daily) (boarding passengers only)

Services
Hanshin Main Line (HS 13)
Mukogawa (HS 12)	Local	Kōshien (HS 14)
Mukogawa (HS 12)	Morning Express	Kōshien (HS 14)
Express: Does not stop at this station
Rapid Express: Does not stop at this station
Morning Limited Express for Umeda: Does not stop at this station
Limited Express; Through Limited Express: Does not stop at this station
Location
- Location within Hyōgo Prefecture Location within Japan

Naruo - Mukogawajoshidai-Mae Station (鳴尾・武庫川女子大前駅, Naruo - Mukogawajoshidai-Mae; station number: HS-13) is a passenger railway station located in the city of Amagasaki, Hyōgo Prefecture, Japan. It is operated by the private transportation company Hanshin Electric Railway. In the official indication, the punctuation after Naruo (鳴尾) is a centered dot.

== Lines ==
Naruo - Mukogawajoshidai-Mae Station is served by the Hanshin Main Line, and is located 13.2 kilometres (8.2 miles) from the terminus of the line at Umeda.

== Layout ==
The station consists of two opposed elevated side platforms serving two tracks. The ticket gate and concourse are on the 2nd floor, and the platforms are on the 3rd floor.

=== Platforms ===
1	■ ■Main Line	for Amagasaki, Osaka (Umeda), Namba, and Nara
2	■ ■Main Line	for Koshien, Kobe (Sannomiya), Akashi, and Himeji

== History ==
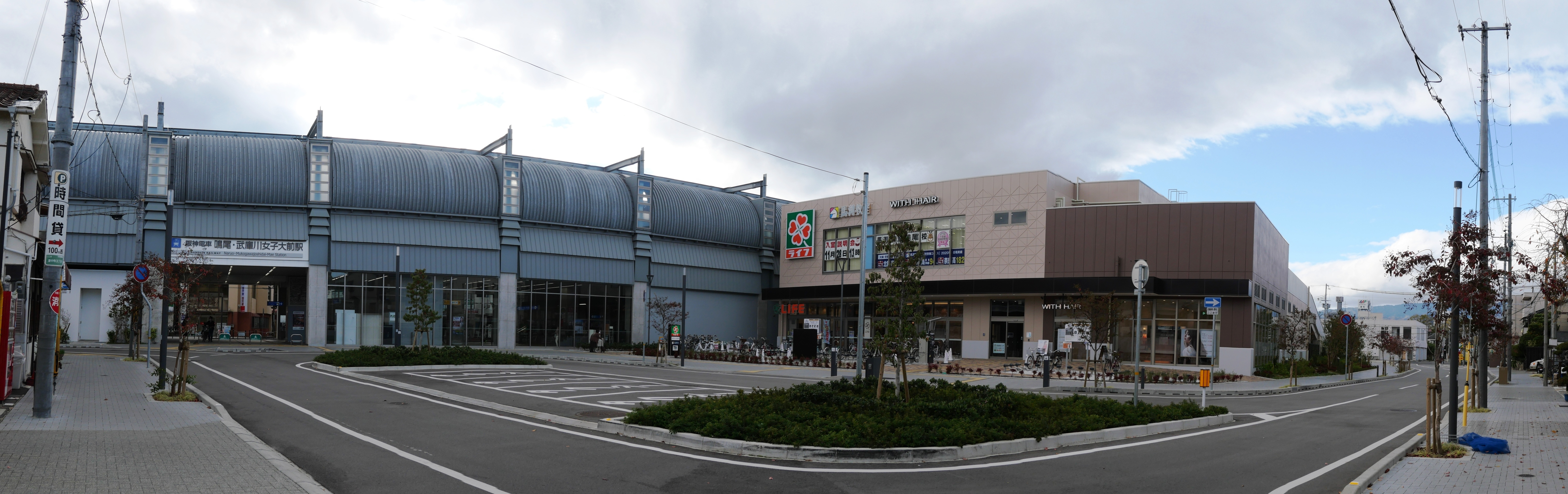
Area around the station

Naruo Station opened on 12 April 1905 along with the rest of the Hanshin Main Line.

Between 2009 and 2017, the station gradually moved from surface level to an elevated structure. The westbound tracks were elevated in 2015 while the eastbound tracks were completed in 2017.

On 1 April 2014, station numbering with Naruo being designated as station number HS-13.

On 1 October 2019, Hanshin renamed this station from Naruo Station (鳴尾駅), mentioning the nearby Mukogawa Women's University.

== Gallery ==
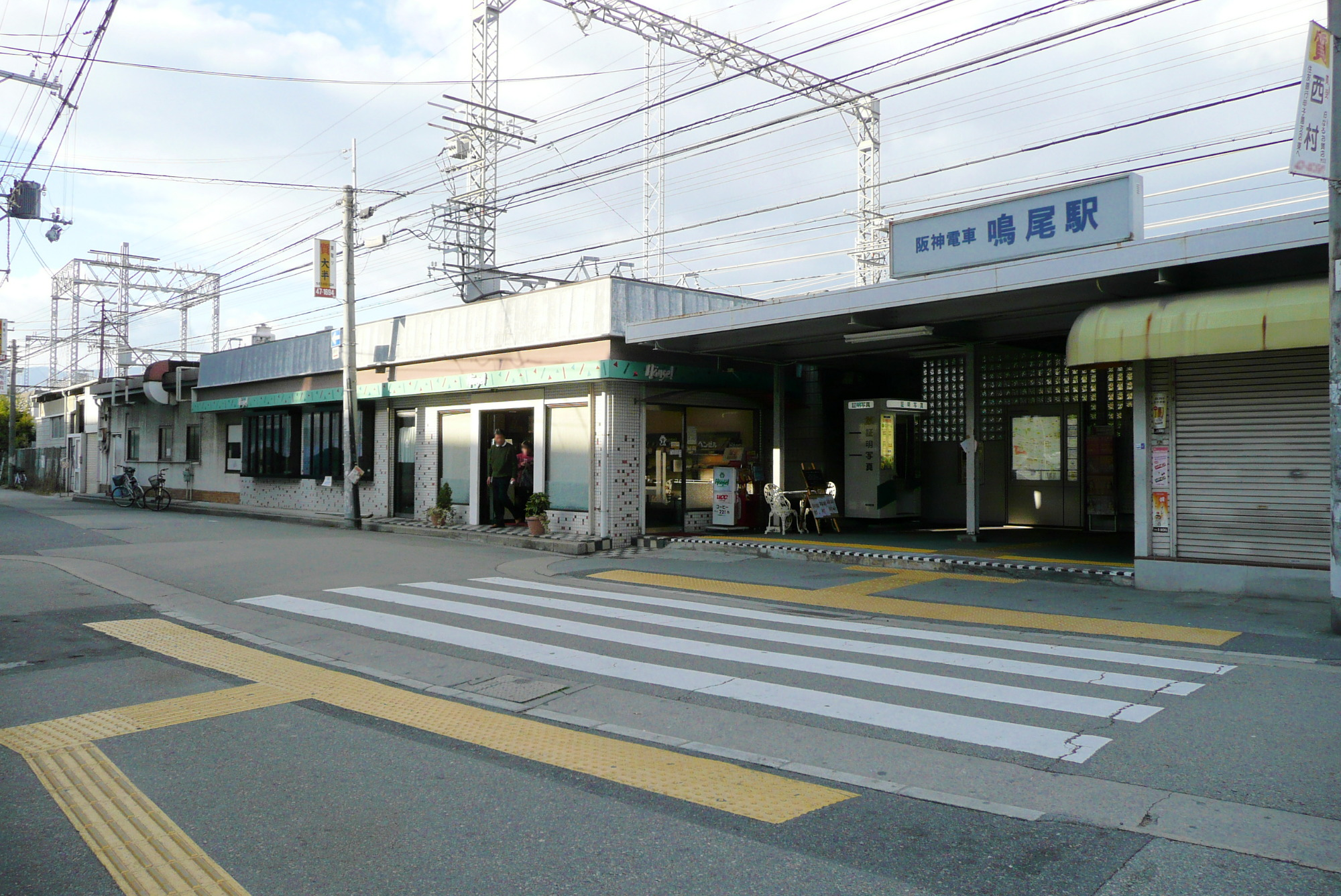
Original south exit before grade separation in 2009

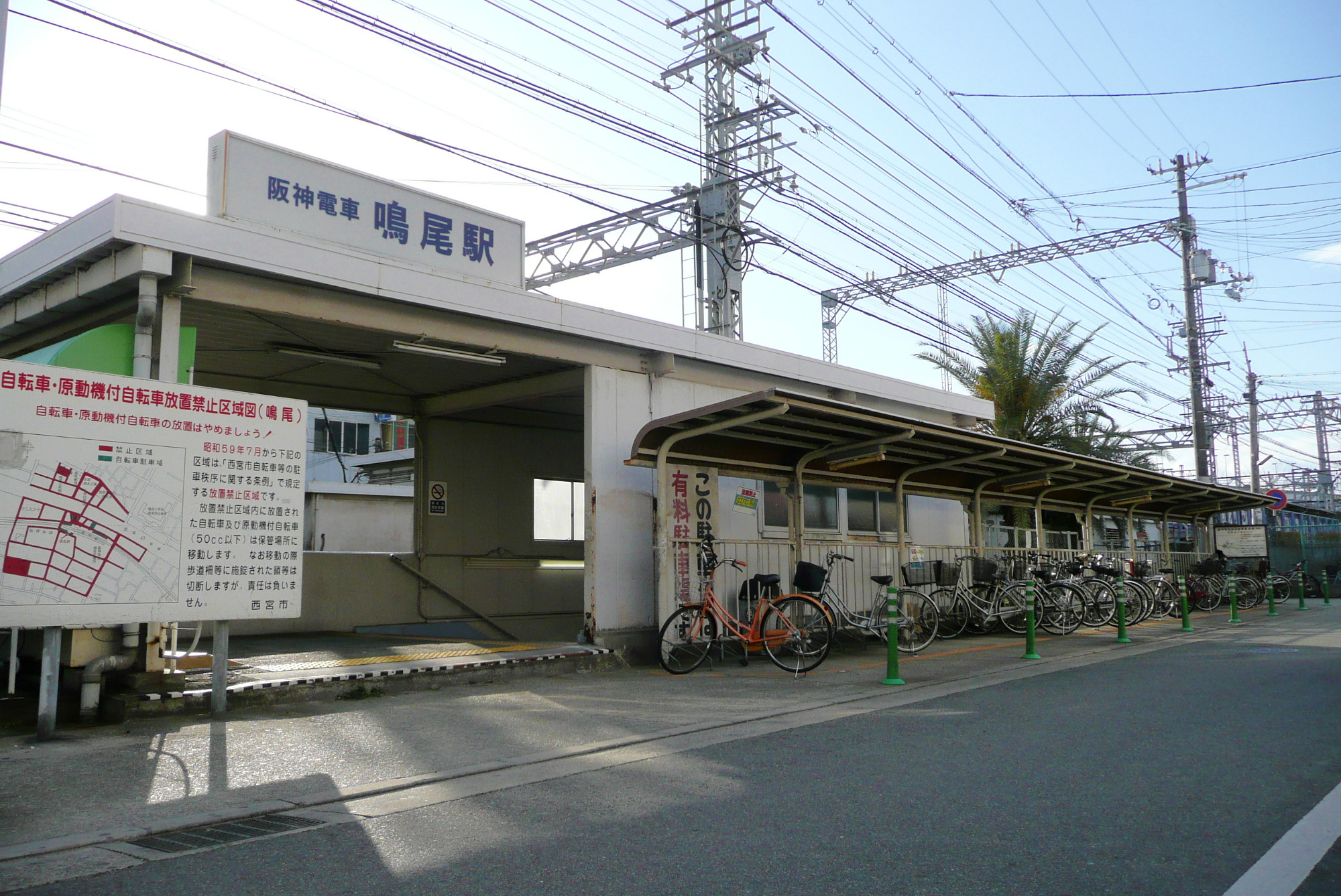
Original north exit before grade separation in 2009

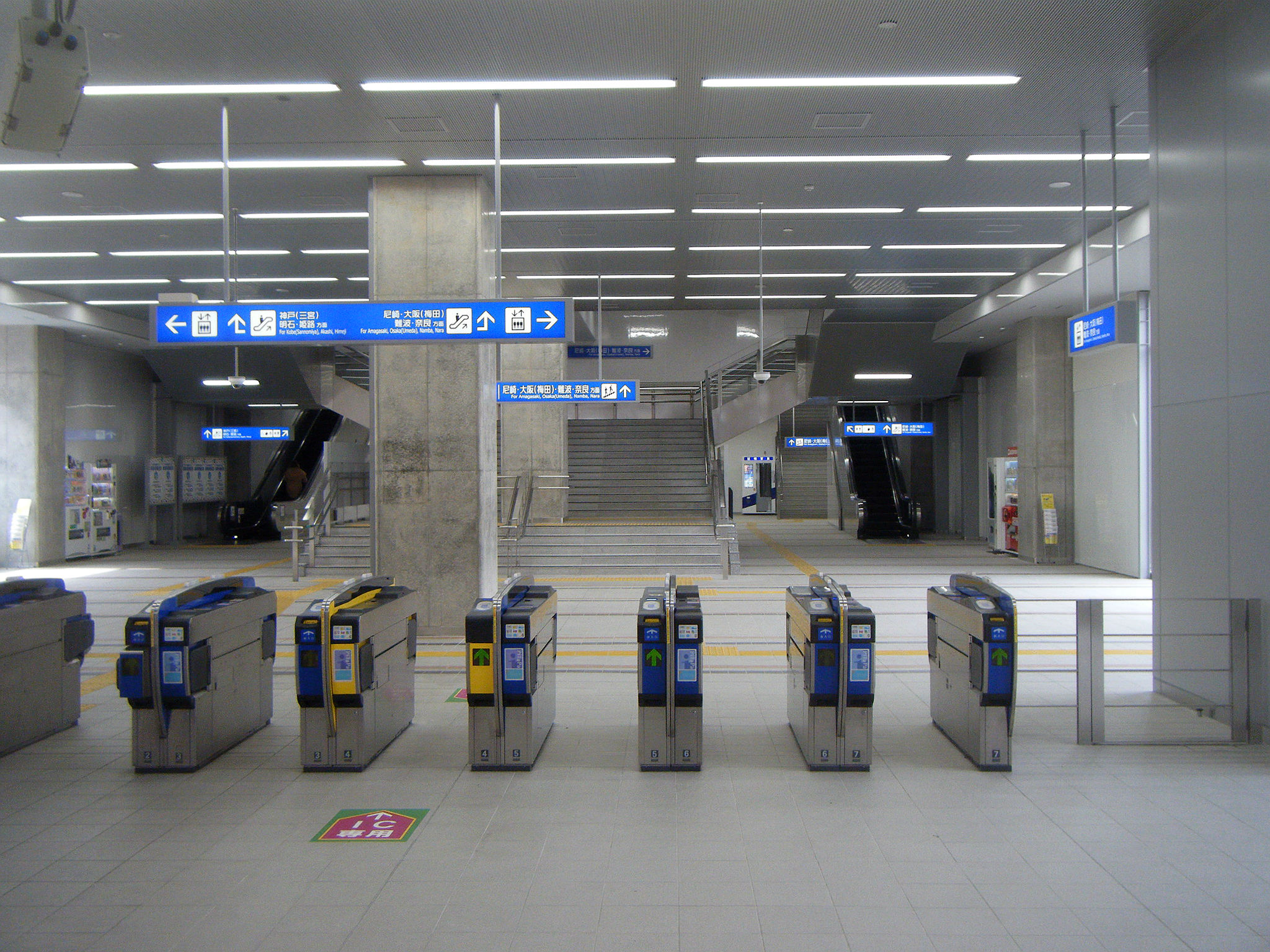
Station concourse in 2017

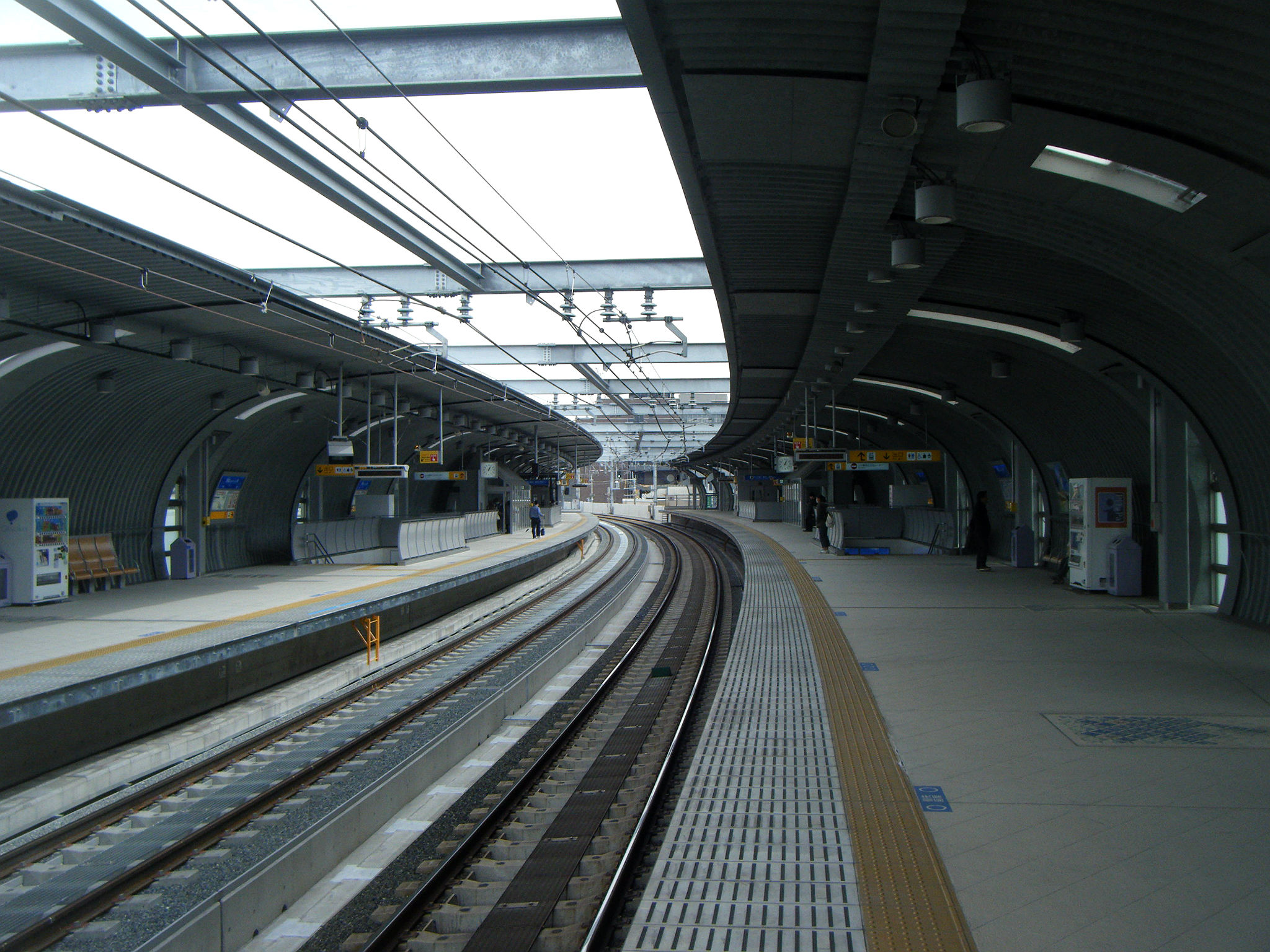
View of the elevated Hanshin Main Line platforms in 2017

== Passenger statistics ==
In fiscal 2020, the station was used by an average of 12,510 passengers daily

== Surrounding area ==
- Mukogawa Women's University
- Nishinomiya Municipal Nishinomiya Higashi High School
- Hyogo Prefectural Naruo High School
- Nishinomiya Municipal Gakubun Junior High School

== See also ==
- List of railway stations in Japan
