= Iyaguchi Station =

Railway station in Miyoshi, Tokushima Prefecture, Japan

Iyaguchi Station 祖谷口駅
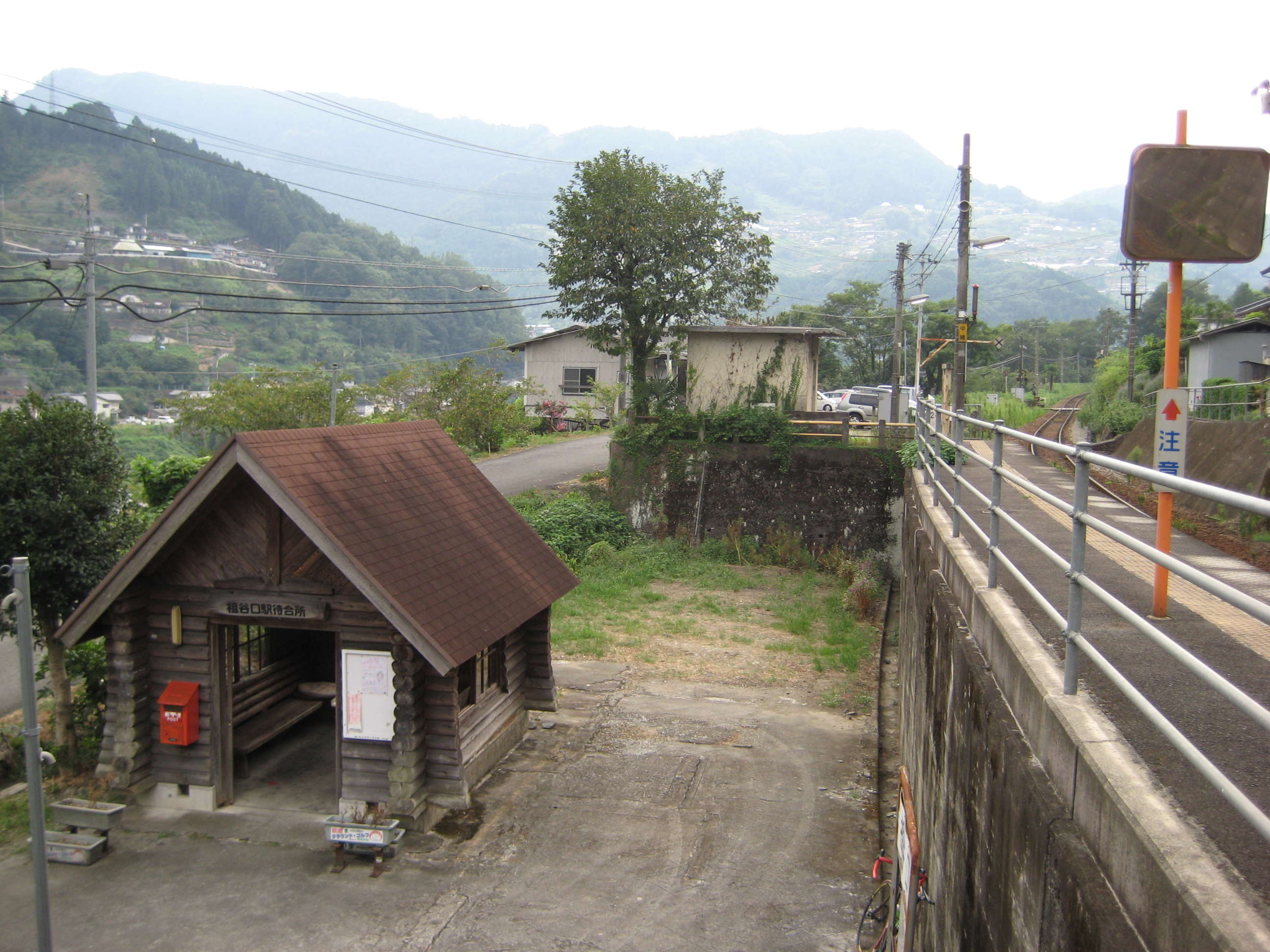
- Iyaguchi Station in 2007

General information
- Location: Shimokawa, Yamashiro Town, Miyoshi City, Tokushima Prefecture; Japan
- Coordinates: 33°58′21″N 133°46′49″E
- Operator: JR Shikoku
- Line: Dosan Line
- Distance: 52.3 km (32.5 mi) from Tadotsu
- Platforms: 1 side platform
- Tracks: 1

Construction
- Parking: Available
- Accessible: No - steps lead up to platform

Other information
- Status: Unstaffed
- Station code: D24

History
- Opened: 28 November 1935; 90 years ago

Passengers
- FY2019: 22

Services
Preceding station	JR Shikoku	Following station
Awa-Kawaguchi towards Kubokawa	Dosan Line	Minawa towards Tadotsu
Location
- Location within Tokushima Prefecture Location within Japan

Iyaguchi Station (祖谷口駅, Iyaguchi-eki) is a passenger railway station located in the city of Miyoshi, Tokushima Prefecture, Japan. It is operated by JR Shikoku and has the station number "D24".

== Lines ==
Iyaguchi Station is served by JR Shikoku's Dosan Line and is located 52.3 km from the beginning of the line at Tadotsu.

== Layout ==
The station, which is unstaffed, consists of a side platform serving a single tracks on a hillside. A flight of steps leads up to the platform from the access road. There is no station building but a log-style building at the base of the steps serves as a waiting room. A shelter is provided on the platform.

== History ==
Iyaguchi Station opened on 28 November 1935 when the then Kōchi Line was extended northwards from Toyonaga to Minawa and the line was renamed the Dosan Line. At this time the station was operated by Japanese Government Railways, later becoming Japanese National Railways (JNR). With the privatization of JNR on 1 April 1987, control of the station passed to JR Shikoku.

== Surrounding area ==
- Matsuogawa Onsen

== See also ==
- List of railway stations in Japan
