= Ōboke Station =

Railway station in Miyoshi, Tokushima Prefecture, Japan

D27 Ōboke Station 大歩危駅
- Ōboke Station in 2026

General information
- Location: Nishiiyayamamura Tokuzennishi, Miyoshi-shi, Tokushima-ken 778-0105; Japan
- Coordinates: 33°52′35″N 133°46′02″E
- Operator: JR Shikoku
- Line: ■ Dosan Line
- Distance: 65.5 km from Tadotsu
- Platforms: 1 side + 1 island platforms
- Tracks: 3 and 1 siding
- Connections: Bus stop

Construction
- Parking: Available
- Cycle facilities: Bike shed
- Accessible: Yes - level crossing connects to all platforms

Other information
- Status: unstaffed
- Station code: D27
- Website: Official website

History
- Opened: 28 November 1935
- Former names: Awa-Akano (until 1950)

Passengers
- FY2019: 71
Location
- Location within Tokushima Prefecture Location within Japan

Ōboke Station (大歩危駅, Ōboke-eki) is a passenger railway station located in the city of Miyoshi, Tokushima Prefecture, Japan. It is operated by JR Shikoku and has the station number "D27".

== Lines ==
Ōboke Station is served by the JR Shikoku Dosan Line and is located 65.5 km from the beginning of the line at Tadotsu. Besides the local trains on the Dosan Line, the Nanpū limited express from Okayama to Kōchi, Nakamura, and Sukumo, and the Shimanto limited express from Takamatsu to Kōchi, Nakamura, and Sukumo also stop at the station.

== Layout ==
The station, which is unstaffed, consists of an island platform and a side platform serving three tracks. A building by the access road serves as a waiting room. From there, a pedestrian level crossing connects to the island platform and, across two more tracks, to the side platform.

A view of the station platforms in 2026.

== Adjacent stations ==
«	Service	»
Dosan Line
Koboke	-	Tosa-Iwahara

== History ==
Ōboke Station opened on 28 November 1935 when the then Kōchi Line was extended northwards from Toyonaga to Minawa and the line was renamed the Dosan Line. At this time the station was named Awa-Akano Station (阿波赤野駅) and was operated by Japanese Government Railways, later becoming Japanese National Railways (JNR). On 1 October 1950, the station was renamed Ōboke Station. With the privatization of JNR on 1 April 1987, control of the station passed to JR Shikoku.

== Passenger statistics ==
In fiscal 2019, the station was used by an average of 71 passengers daily.

== Surrounding area ==
- Yoshino River - the second longest river in Shikoku. The track runs on the left bank and a scenic view of the river is available from the side platform.
- National Route 32 - this main trunk route runs parallel to the track on the other side of the Yoshino River.
- Ōboke Gorge - a scenic gorge on the Yoshino River. Boat excursions are available near the station.

== Bus services ==
A bus stop for buses operated by the Shikoku Transportation Company or Miyoshi city bus is located near the front entrance of the station.

Main Destination

- Kazurabashi Bridge(ja:かずら橋)
- Awa-Ikeda Station / Awa-Ikeda Bus terminal(ja:阿波池田バスターミナル)

== See also ==
- List of railway stations in Japan
