= Mukogawa Station =

Railway station in Amagasaki, Hyōgo Prefecture, Japan

Mukogawa Station 武庫川駅
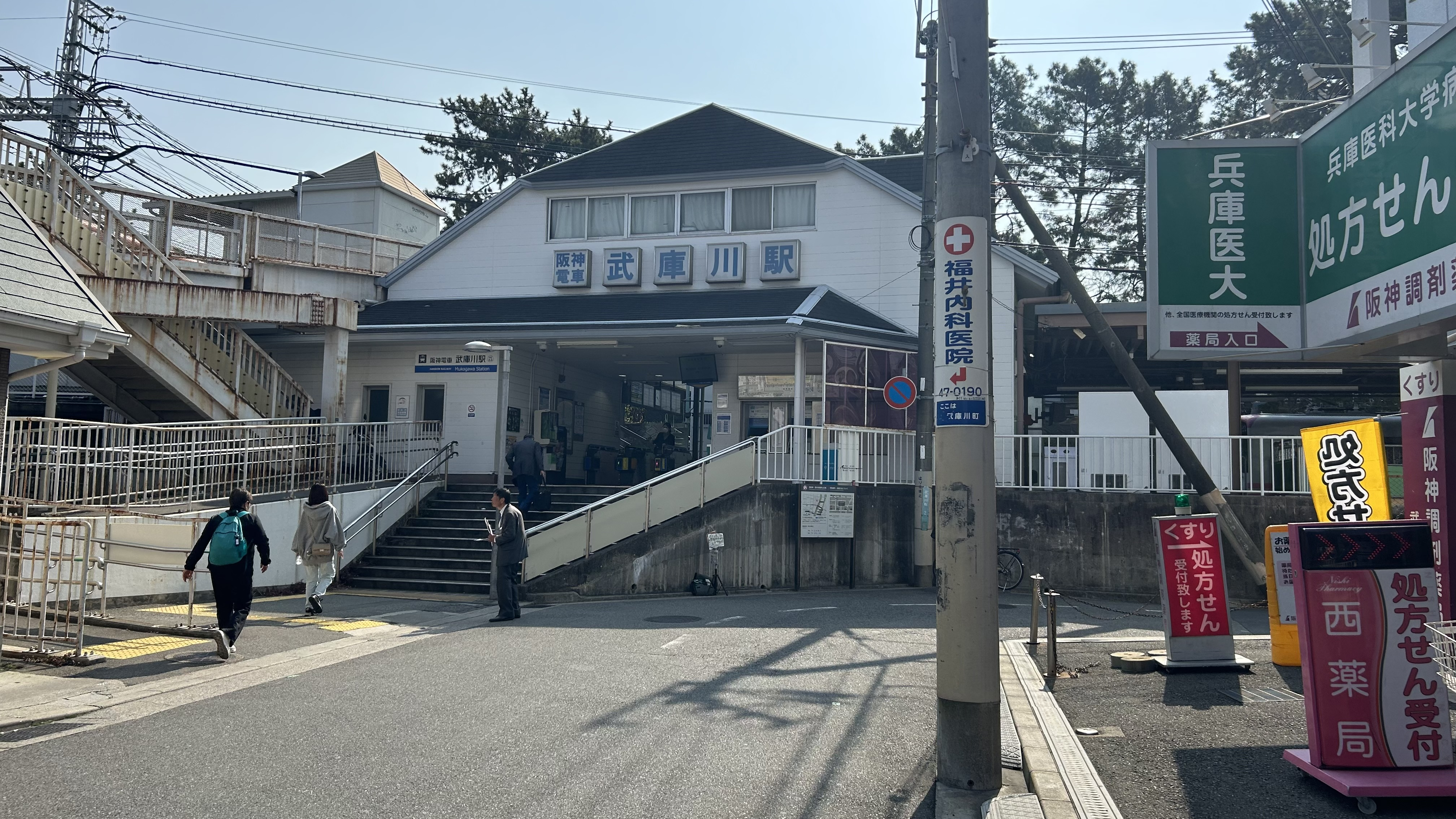
- Mukogawa Station west entrance in March 2025

General information
- Location: Mukogawacho, Nishinomiya-shi, Hyōgo-ken (Mukogawa Line); 1, Osho-nishimachi, Amagasaki-shi, Hyōgo-ken (Main Line); Japan
- Coordinates: 34°43′06″N 135°22′58″E
- Operator: Hanshin
- Lines: Main Line; Mukogawa Line
- Platforms: Main Line: 2 side platforms Mukogawa Line: 1 island platform
- Tracks: Main Line: 2 Mukogawa Line: 2 (1 not in use)
- Connections: Bus stop

Construction
- Structure type: Main Line: Elevated; Mukogawa Line: Ground

Other information
- Status: Staffed
- Station code: HS 12
- Website: Official website

History
- Opened: April 12, 1905

Passengers
- 2019: 29,867 (daily)

Services
Preceding station	Hanshin	Following station
Amagasaki Center Pool-mae HS 11 towards Osaka-Umeda	Main Line Local	Naruo - Mukogawajoshidai-Mae HS 13 towards Motomachi
Amagasaki HS 09 towards Osaka-Umeda	Main Line Morning Express (weekdays)	Naruo - Mukogawajoshidai-Mae HS 13 towards Motomachi
Amagasaki HS 09 towards Osaka-Umeda	Main Line Express	Kōshien HS 14 towards Motomachi
Amagasaki HS 09 towards Osaka-Umeda	Main Line Rapid Express (except weekday mornings or evenings)	Kōshien HS 14 towards Motomachi
Terminus	Mukogawa Line	Higashi-Naruo HS 53 towards Mukogawadanchi-Mae
Location
- Location within Hyōgo Prefecture Location within Japan

Mukogawa Station (武庫川駅, Mukogawa-eki; station number: HS-12) is a passenger railway station located on the border between the cities of Amagasaki and Nishinomiya, Hyōgo Prefecture, Japan. Thus, the respective east and west entrances to the station are in different cities. It is operated by the private transportation company Hanshin Electric Railway.

== Lines ==
Mukogawa Station is served by the Hanshin Main Line, and is located 12.0 kilometers from the terminus of the line at Umeda. It is also the terminus of the 1.7 kilometer Hanshin Mukogawa Line.

== Layout ==
The station consists of two opposed elevated side platforms serving two tracks on a bridge over Mukogawa River for the Hanshin Main Line. The unnumbered dead-headed Mukogawa Line island platform is on the Nishinomiya (west) side of the bridge, perpendicular to the Main Line. One side of the platform is not in use.

=== Platforms ===
Main Line

1	■ ■■Main Line	for Amagasaki, Osaka-Umeda, Ōsaka Namba, and Nara
2	■ ■■Main Line	for Koshien, Kobe-Sannomiya, Akashi, and Himeji

Mukogawa Line

■ Mukogawa Line	for Mukogawa-danchimae

== History ==
Mukogawa Station opened on April 12, 1905 along with the rest of the Hanshin Main Line.

Station numbering was introduced on April 1, 2014, with Mukogawa being designated as station number HS 12.

== Gallery ==
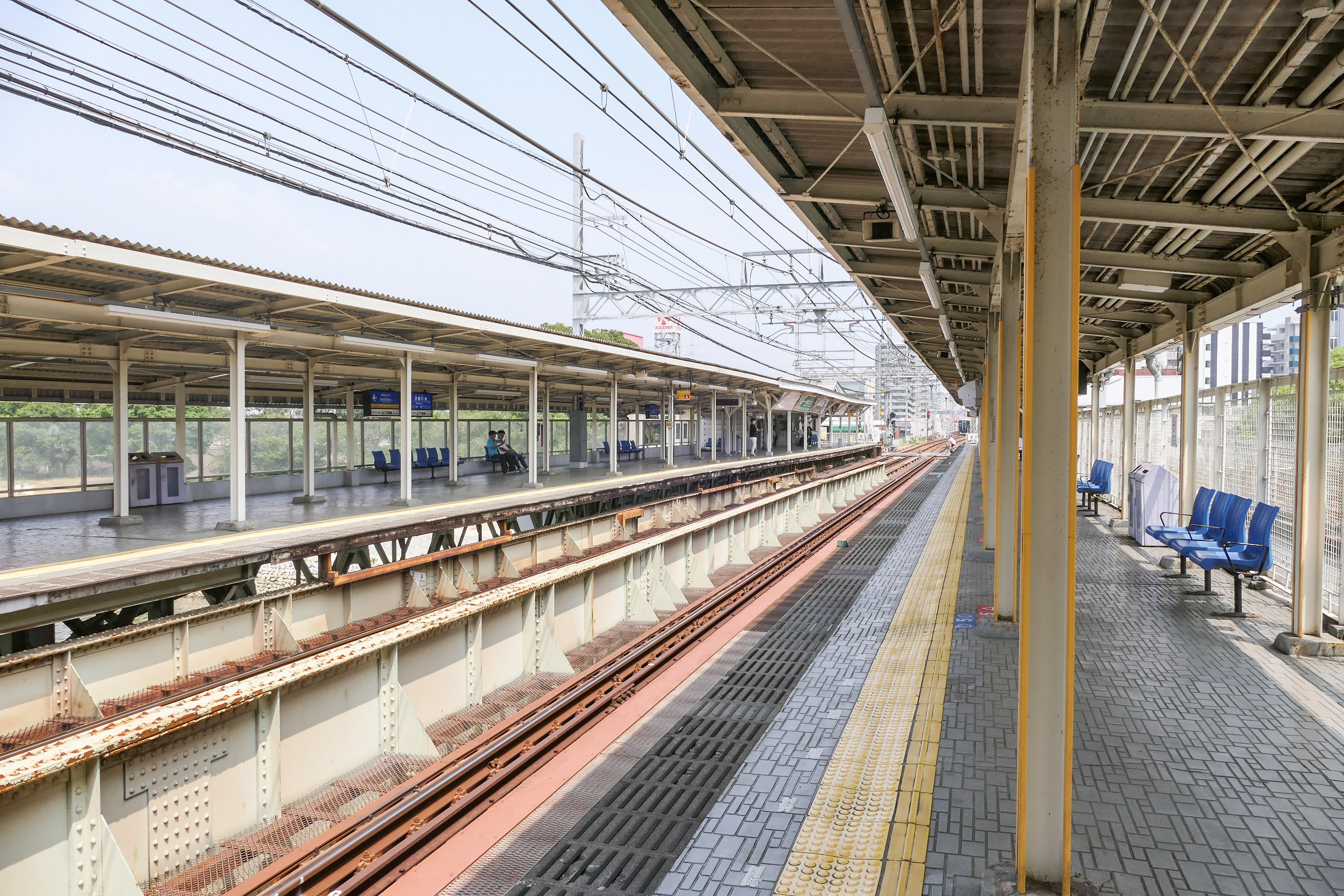
Main Line platforms in July 2025

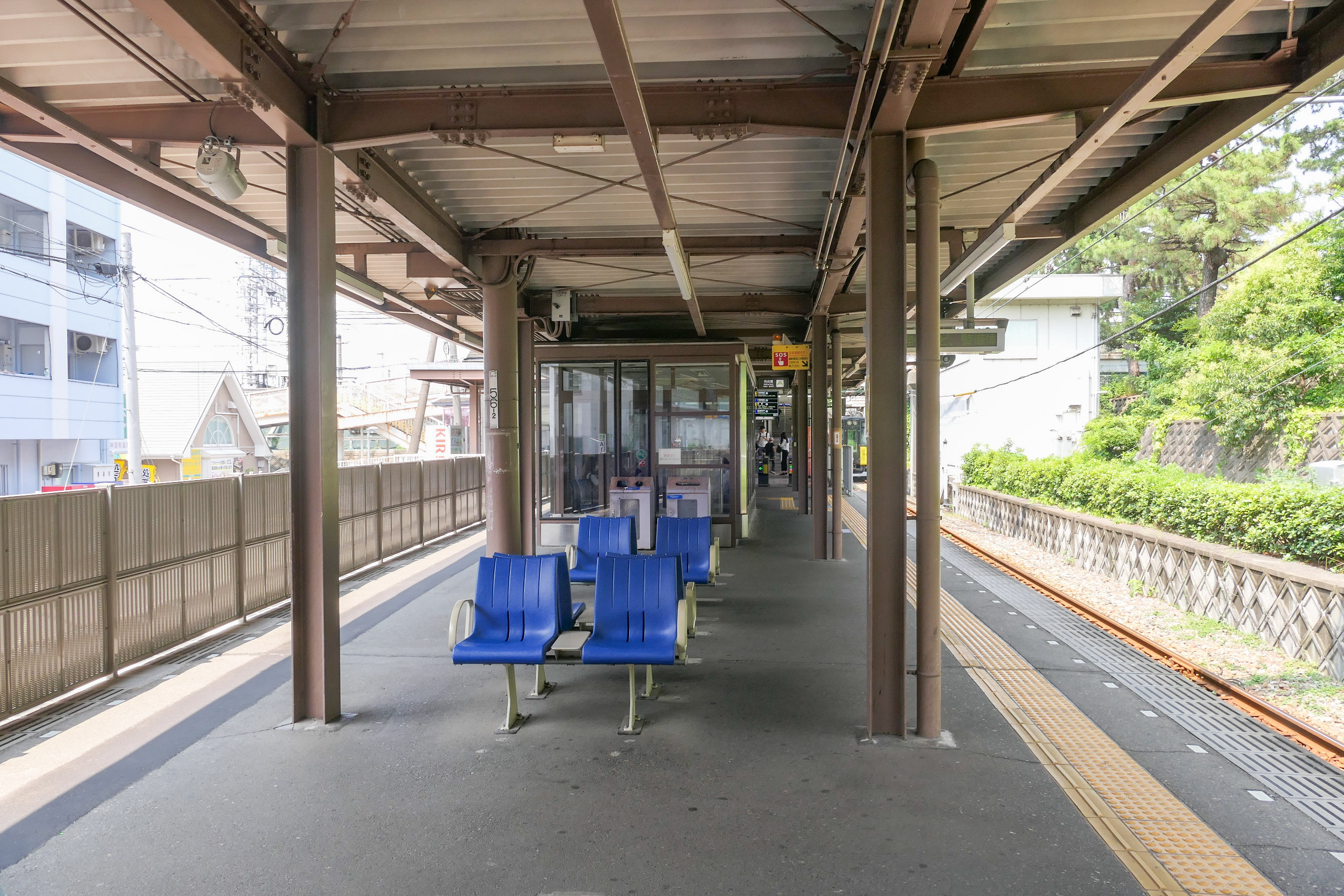
Mukogawa Line platforms in July 2025

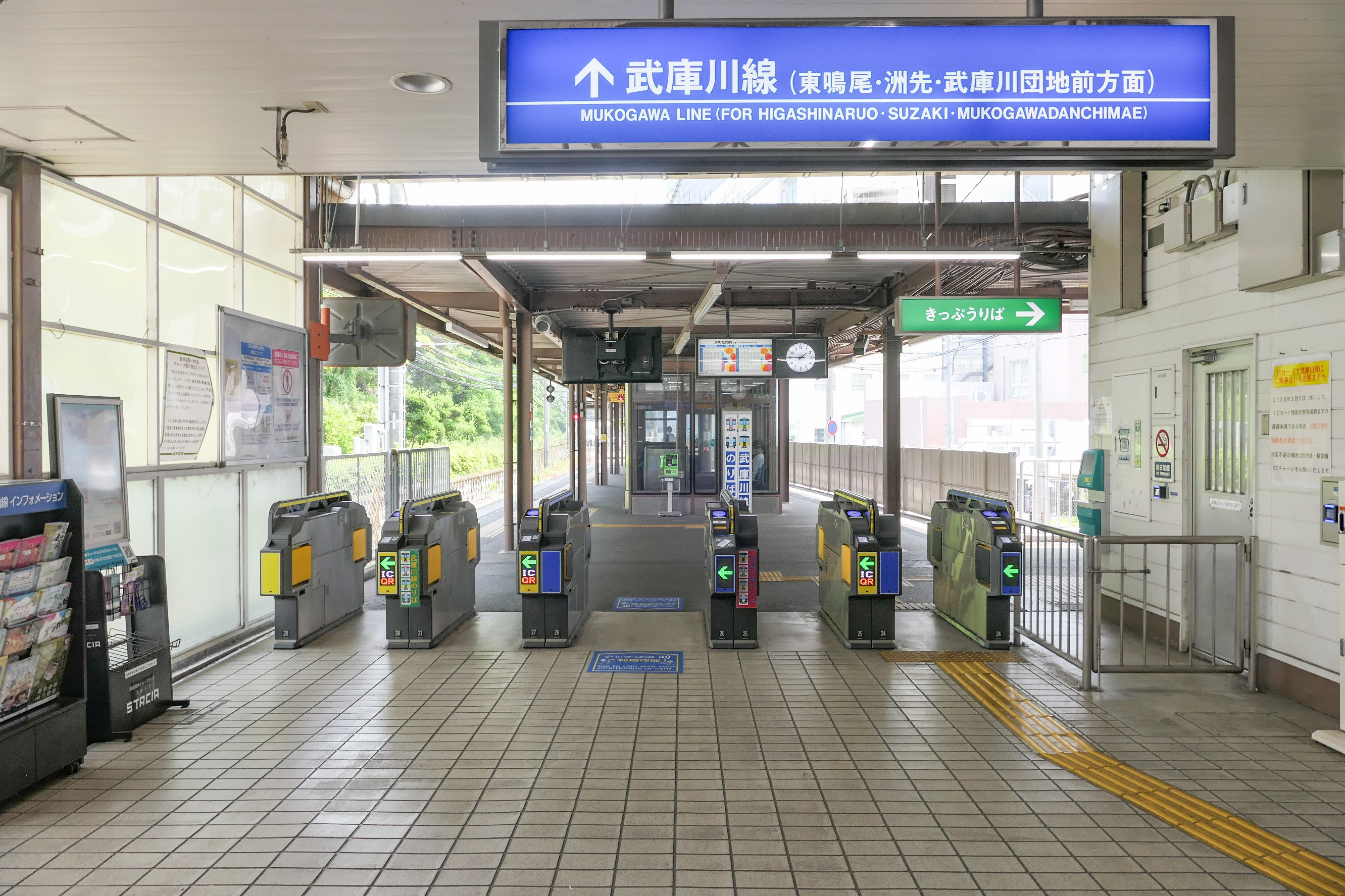
Mukogawa Line ticketing area in July 2025

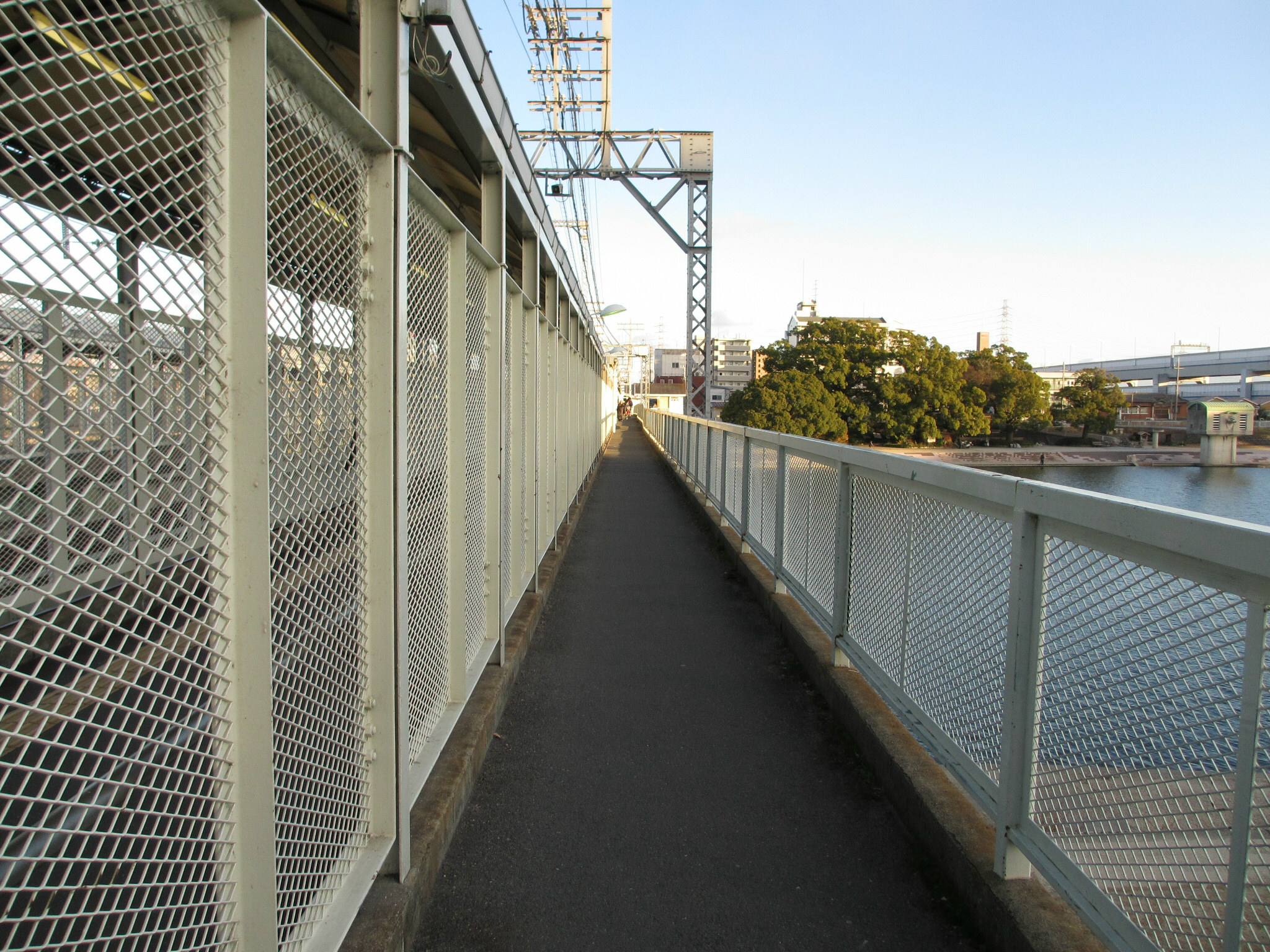
Pedestrian Bridge across the Mukogawa River along the south-facing side of the westbound platform on the Main Line

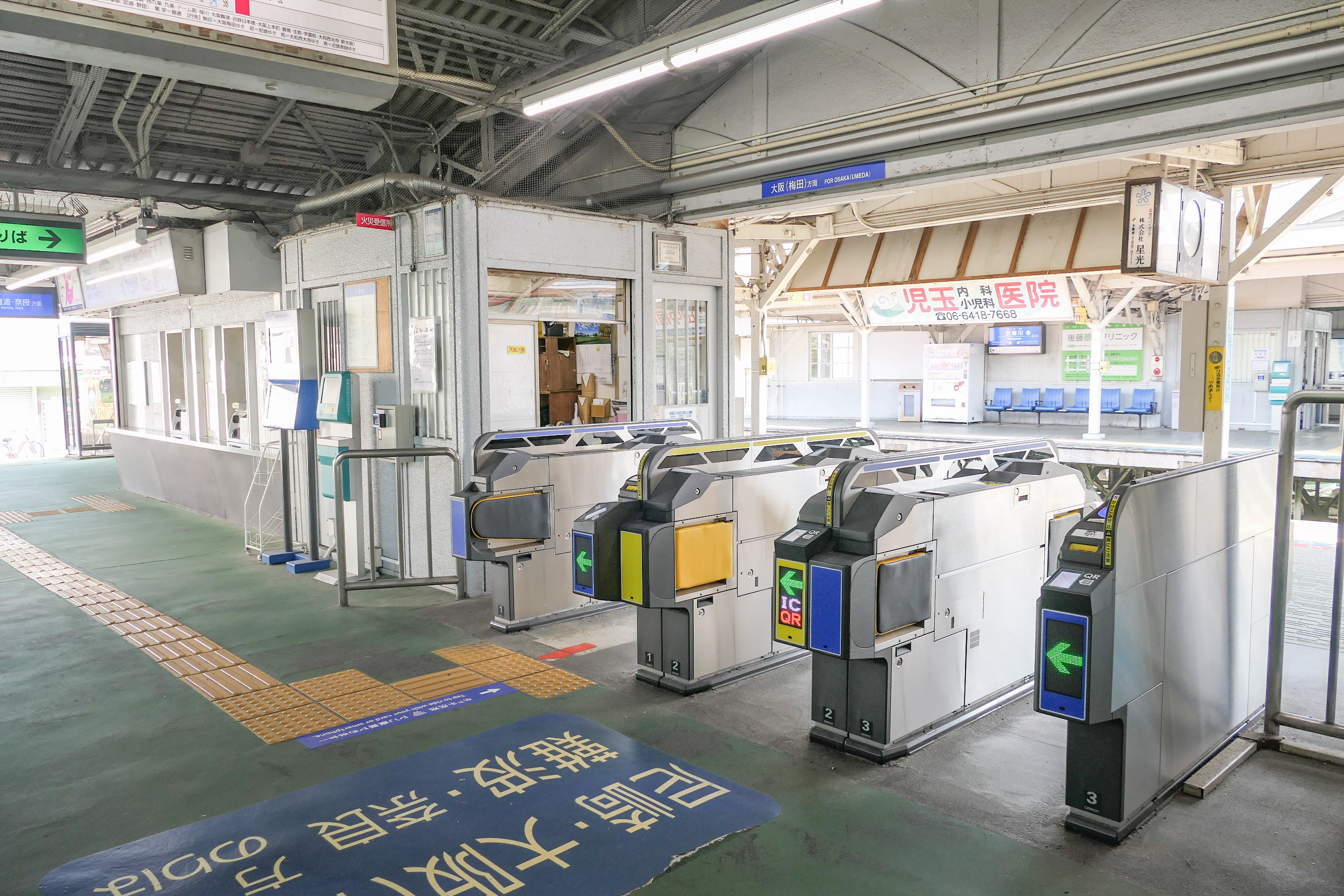
East exit ticketing area in July 2025

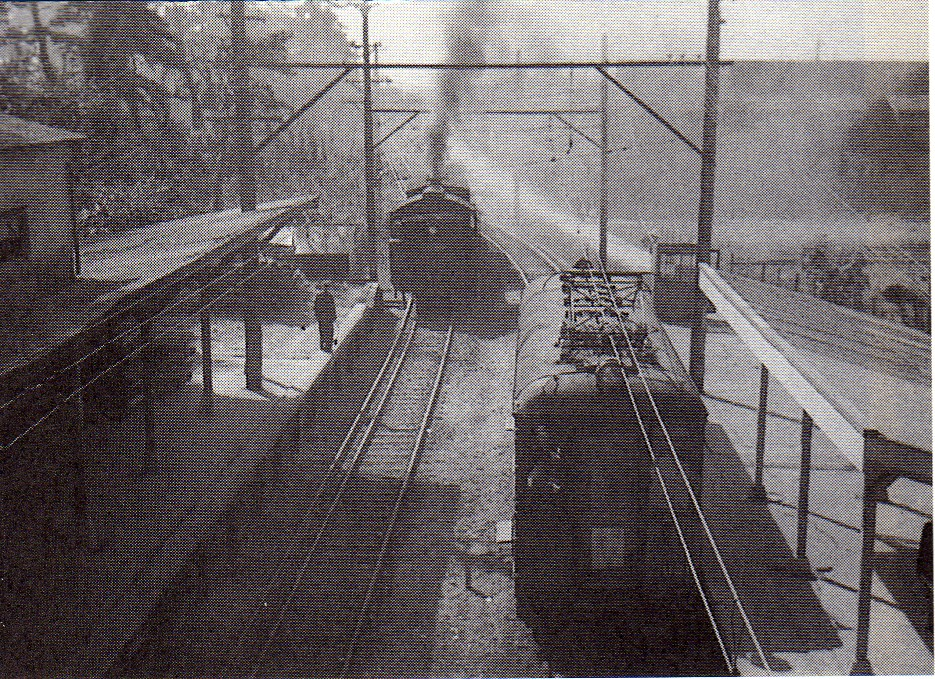
Mukogawa Station in the 1950s

== Passenger statistics ==
In fiscal 2020, the station was used by an average of 29,867 passengers daily.

== Surrounding area ==
- Hyogo College of Medicine
- Hyogo College of Medicine Hospital

== See also ==
- List of railway stations in Japan
