= Mukogawadanchimae Station =

Railway station in Nishinomiya, Hyōgo Prefecture, Japan

Mukogawadanchimae Station 武庫川団地前駅
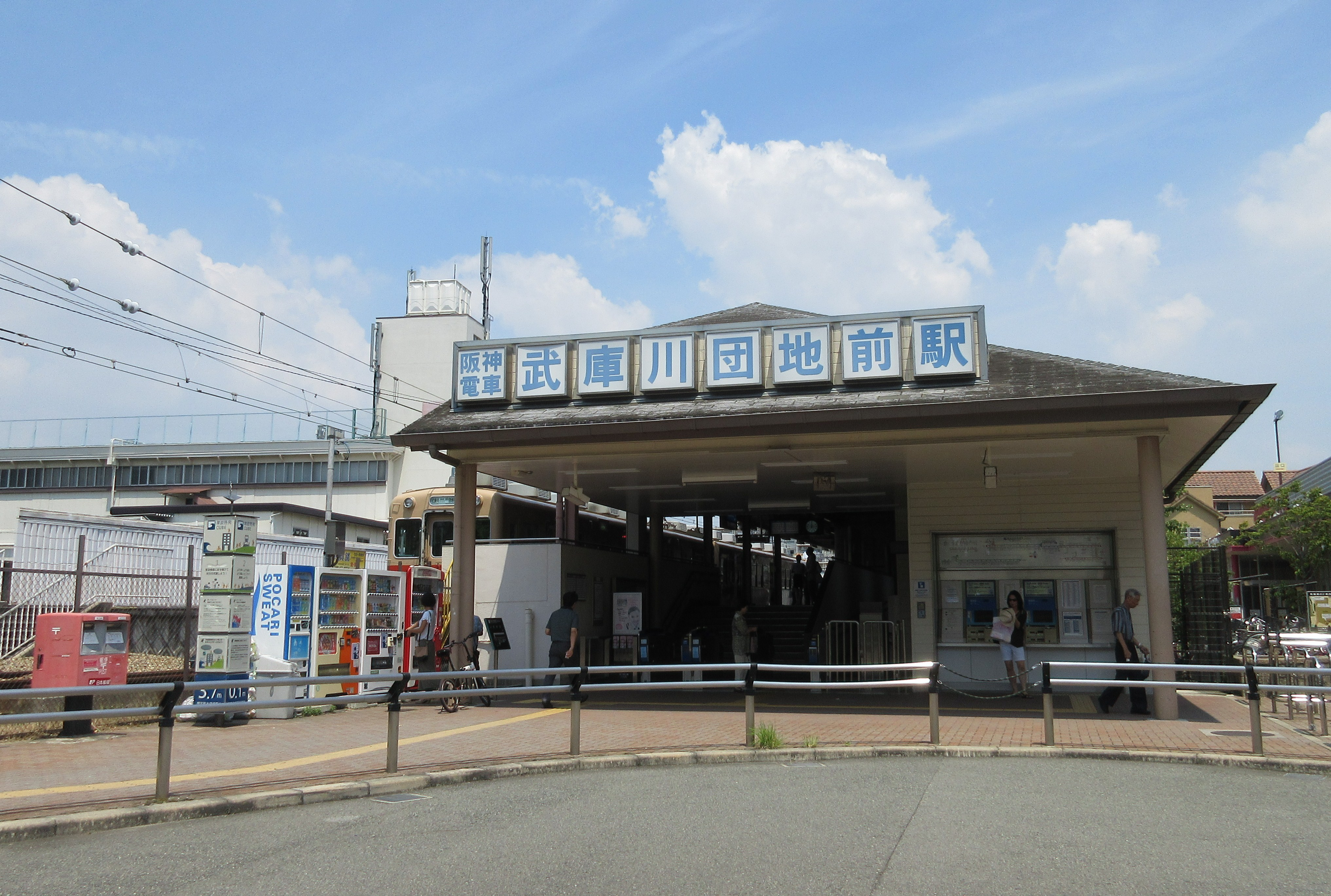
- Mukogawadanchimae Station in August 2015

General information
- Location: Uedahigashi-chō, Nishinomiya-shi, Hyōgo-ken 663-8133; Japan
- Coordinates: 34°42′18″N 135°22′29″E
- Operator: Hanshin Electric Railway
- Line: ■ Mukogawa Line
- Distance: 1.7 km (1.1 miles) from Mukogawa
- Platforms: 1 bay platform
- Connections: Bus stop

Other information
- Station code: HS 51
- Website: Official website

History
- Opened: April 3, 1984

Passengers
- 2019: 3,866 (daily)

Services
Preceding station	Hanshin	Following station
Suzaki towards Mukogawa	Mukogawa Line	Terminus
Location
- Location within Hyōgo Prefecture Location within Japan

Mukogawadanchimae Station (武庫川団地前駅, Mukogawadanchimae-eki; station number: HS-51) is a passenger railway station located in the city of Nishinomiya Hyōgo Prefecture, Japan. It is operated by the private transportation company Hanshin Electric Railway.

== Lines ==
Mukogawadanchimae Station is the southern terminus by the Hanshin Mukogawa Line, and is located 1.7 kilometers from the opposing terminus of the line at Mukogawa.

== Layout ==
The station consists of a two bay platforms.

== History ==
Mukogawadanchimae Station opened on the Hanshin Mukogawa Line on 3 April 1984.

== Passenger statistics ==
In fiscal 2019, the station was used by an average of 3,866 passengers daily

== Surrounding area ==
- Mukogawa Housing Complex
- Nishinomiya Municipal Takasu Public Hall
- Nishinomiya City Hall Naruo Branch Takasu Branch
- Nishinomiya City Central Library Takasu Branch
- Nishinomiya Municipal Naruo Minami Junior High School

== See also ==
- List of railway stations in Japan
