= Minawa Station =

Railway station in Miyoshi, Tokushima Prefecture, Japan

D23 Minawa Station 三縄駅
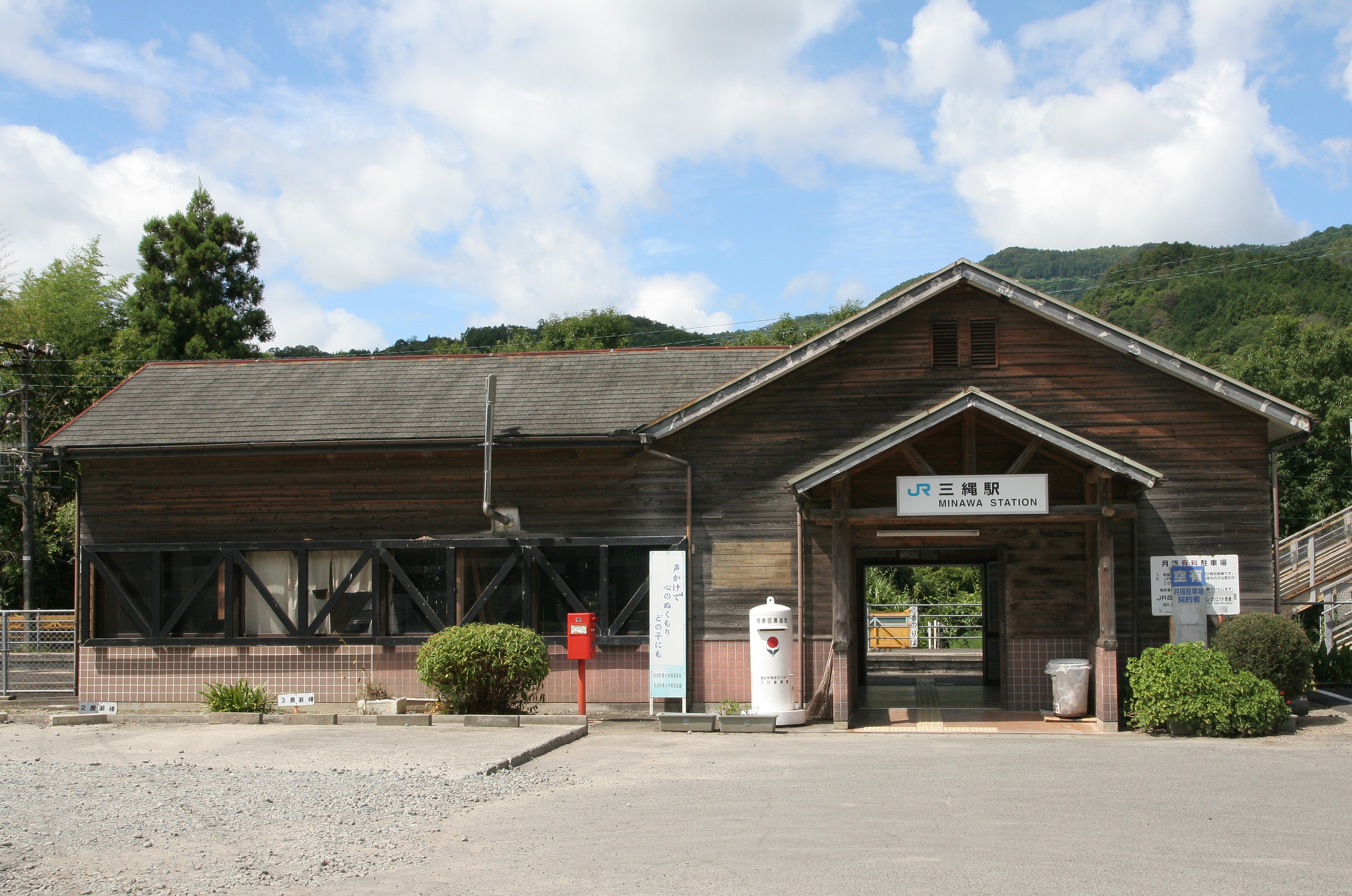
- Minawa Station in 2008

General information
- Location: Ikedacho Nakanishi, Miyoshi, Tokushima Prefecture 779-5161; Japan
- Coordinates: 34°00′25″N 133°47′15″E
- Operator: JR Shikoku
- Line: ■ Dosan Line
- Distance: 47.8 km (29.7 mi) from Tadotsu
- Platforms: 2 side platforms
- Tracks: 2

Construction
- Parking: Available
- Accessible: No - footbridge needed to access one of the side platforms

Other information
- Status: Unstaffed
- Station code: D23

History
- Opened: 19 September 1931

Passengers
- FY2019: 30
Location
- Location within Tokushima Prefecture Location within Japan

Minawa Station (三縄駅, Minawa-eki) is a passenger railway station located in the city of Miyoshi, Tokushima Prefecture, Japan. It is operated by JR Shikoku and has the station number "D23".

== Lines ==
Minawa Station is served by the JR Shikoku Dosan Line and is located 47.8 km (29.7 mi) from the beginning of the line at Tadotsu.

== Layout ==
The station, which is unstaffed, consists of two opposed side platforms serving two tracks. A timber building connected to Platform 1 serves as a waiting room. A footbridge connects to Platform 2 across the tracks. Originally Platform 2 was an island platform with a third track on the other side but the track has now become a siding. Approaching Platform 1 from Iyaguchi, the track branches into another siding leading to an old freight platform.

== Adjacent stations ==
«	Service	»
Dosan Line
Awa-Ikeda	-	Iyaguchi

== History ==
Minawa Station opened on 19 September 1931 as the terminus of the then Tokushima Main Line (now Tokushima Line). By 28 November 1938, the then Kōchi Line had been extended northwards from Iyaguchi. The stretch from Tadotsu to Suzaki was renamed the Dosan Line and Minawa became a station on this line and ceased to be part of the Tokushima Line. At this time the station was operated by Japanese Government Railways, later corporatised as Japanese National Railways (JNR). With the privatization of JNR on 1 April 1987, control of the station passed to JR Shikoku.

== Surrounding area ==
- Tokushima Prefectural Road No. 268
- Tokushima Prefectural Road No. 269
- Kurozo Marsh
- Miyoshi Bridge

== See also ==
- List of railway stations in Japan
