= Tosa-Ananai Station =

Railway station in Ōtoyo, Kōchi Prefecture, Japan

D31 Tosa-Ananai Station 土佐穴内駅
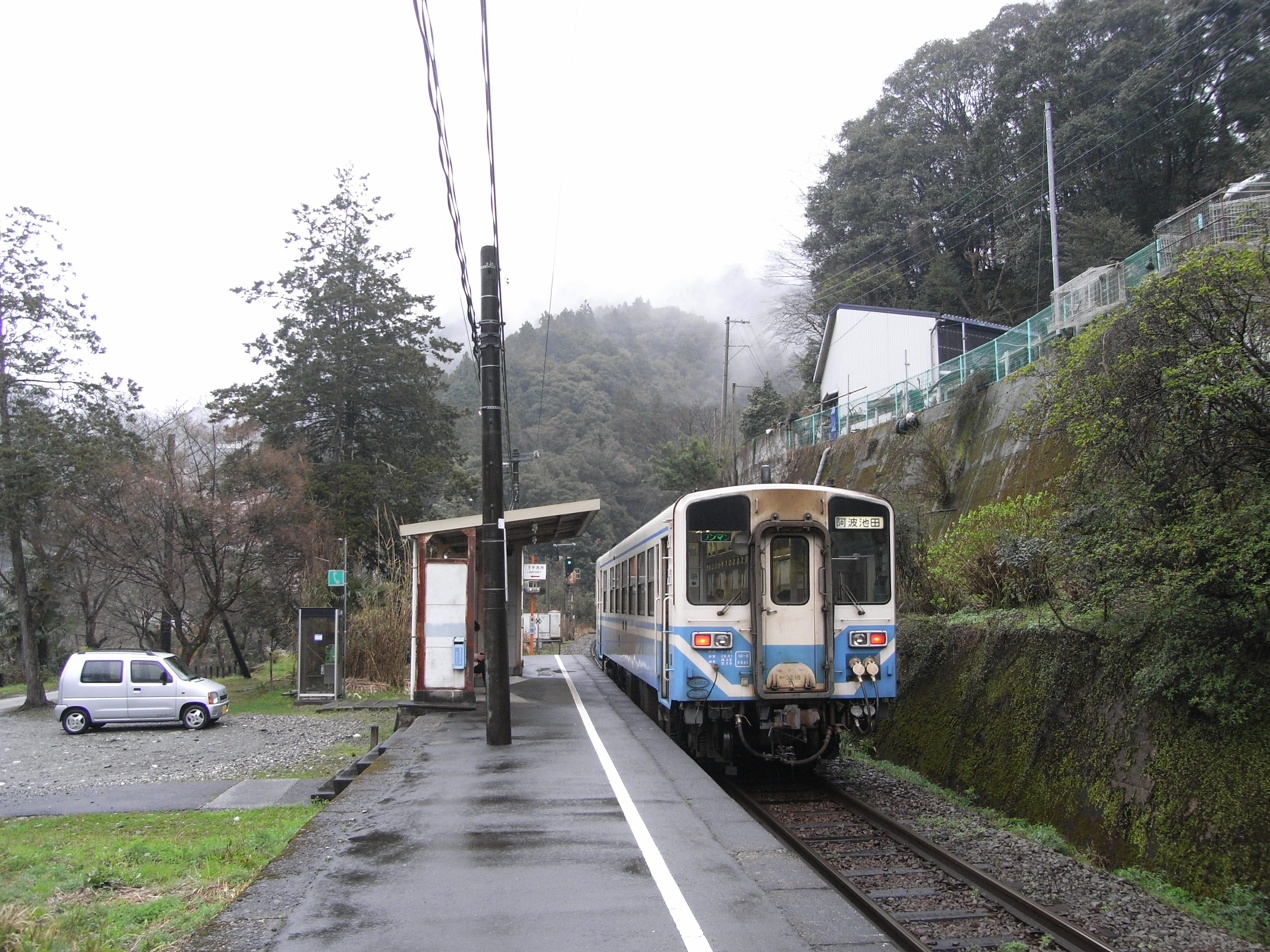
- Tosa-Ananai Station in 2008. A waiting room and bike shed have since been erected.

General information
- Location: Ananai, Ōtoyo-chō, Nagaoka-gun, Kōchi-ken 789-0307; Japan
- Coordinates: 33°46′45″N 133°41′46″E
- Operator: JR Shikoku
- Line: Dosan Line
- Distance: 83.2 km from Tadotsu
- Platforms: 1 side platform
- Tracks: 1

Construction
- Parking: Available
- Cycle facilities: Bike shed
- Accessible: No - steps lead up to platform

Other information
- Status: unstaffed
- Station code: D31

History
- Opened: 28 October 1934

Passengers
- FY2019: 6
Location
- Location within Kochi Prefecture Location within Japan

Tosa-Ananai Station (土佐穴内駅, Tosa-Ananai-eki) is a passenger railway station located in the town of Ōtoyo, Nagaoka District, Kōchi Prefecture, Japan. It is operated by JR Shikoku and has the station number "D31".

== Lines ==
The station is served by JR Shikoku's Dosan Line and is located 83.2 km from the beginning of the line at Tadotsu.

== Layout ==
The station, which is unstaffed, consists of a side platform serving a single track. By the side of the access road, a waiting room and bike shed have been erected. From there, a short flight of steps leads up to the platform which also has a weather shelter.

== Adjacent stations ==
«	Service	»
Dosan Line
Ōtaguchi	-	Ōsugi

== History ==
The station opened on 28 October 1934 when the then Kōchi Line was extended northwards from Ōsugi to Toyonaga. At this time the station was operated by Japanese Government Railways, later becoming Japanese National Railways (JNR). With the privatization of JNR on 1 April 1987, control of the station passed to JR Shikoku.

== Surrounding area ==
The station is a little far from the village of Anai, and there are few private houses around the station.

- Otoyo Municipal Ananai Elementary School/Junior High School (closed)
- Japan National Route 32

== See also ==
- List of railway stations in Japan
