= Ōtaguchi Station =

Railway station in Ōtoyo, Kōchi Prefecture, Japan

D30 Ōtaguchi Station 大田口駅
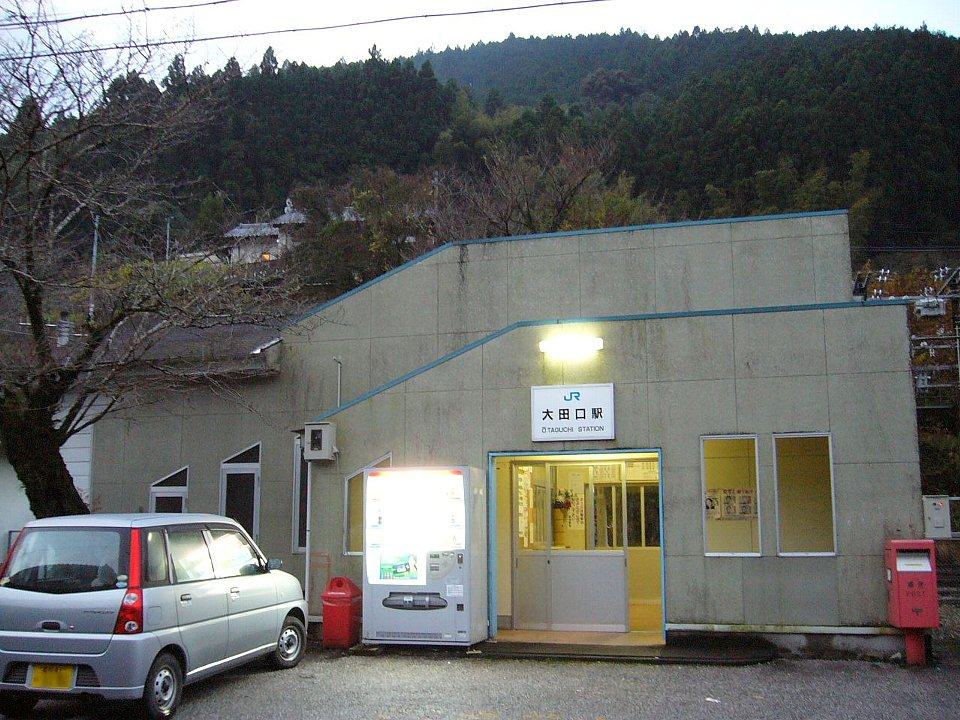
- Ōtaguchi Station in 2006

General information
- Location: Kuroishi, Ōtoyo-chō, Nagaoka-gun, Kōchi-ken 789-0250; Japan
- Coordinates: 33°47′08″N 133°43′35″E
- Operator: JR Shikoku
- Line: Dosan Line
- Distance: 80.4 km from Tadotsu
- Platforms: 1 island platform
- Tracks: 2

Construction
- Parking: Available
- Accessible: Yes - island platform accessed by level crossing

Other information
- Status: Unstaffed
- Station code: D30

History
- Opened: 28 October 1934

Passengers
- FY2019: 14
Location
- Location within Kochi Prefecture Location within Japan

Ōtaguchi Station (大田口駅, Ōtaguchi-eki) is a passenger railway station located in the town of Ōtoyo, Nagaoka District, Kōchi Prefecture, Japan. It is operated by JR Shikoku and has the station number "D30".

== Lines ==
The station is served by JR Shikoku's Dosan Line and is located 80.4 km from the beginning of the line at Tadotsu.

== Layout ==
The station consists of an island platform serving two tracks. By the side of the tracks, a station building serves as a waiting room. Access to the island platform is by means of a level crossing. A passing siding runs between the station building and the island platform. The station is unstaffed but a shop nearby sells some types of tickets.

== Adjacent stations ==
«	Service	»
Dosan Line
Toyonaga	Local	Tosa-Ananai

== History ==
The station opened on 28 October 1934 when the then Kōchi Line was extended northwards from Ōsugi to Toyonaga. At this time the station was operated by Japanese Government Railways, later becoming Japanese National Railways (JNR). With the privatization of JNR on 1 April 1987, control of the station passed to JR Shikoku.

== Surrounding area ==
- Yoshida Shoten (consignment of ticket sales)
- Japan National Route 32

== See also ==
- List of railway stations in Japan
