= Tosa-Iwahara Station =

Railway station in Ōtoyo, Kōchi Prefecture, Japan

D28 Tosa-Iwahara Station 土佐岩原駅
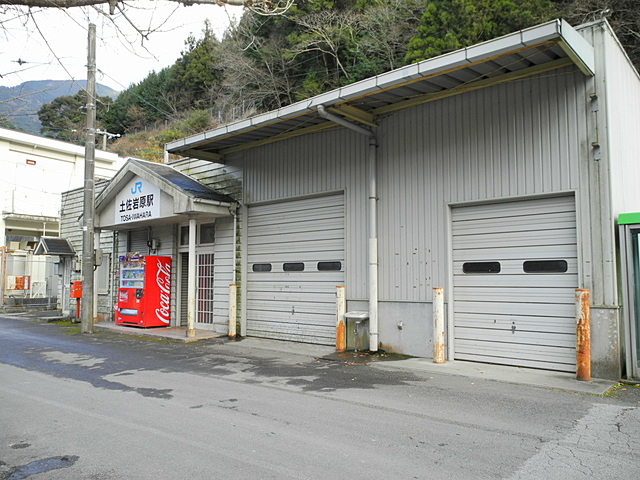
- Tosa-Iwahara Station in 2011

General information
- Location: Iwahara, Ōtoyo-chō, Nagaoka-gun, Kōchi-ken 789-0158; Japan
- Coordinates: 33°49′21″N 133°47′18″E
- Operator: JR Shikoku
- Line: Dosan Line
- Distance: 72.7 km from Tadotsu
- Platforms: 2 side platforms
- Tracks: 2

Construction
- Parking: Available
- Accessible: No - footbridge needed to access one platform

Other information
- Status: unstaffed
- Station code: D28

History
- Opened: 28 November 1935

Passengers
- FY2019: 8
Location
- Location within Kochi Prefecture Location within Japan

Tosa-Iwahara Station (土佐岩原駅, Tosa-Iwahara-eki) is a passenger railway station located in the town of Ōtoyo, Nagaoka District, Kōchi Prefecture, Japan. It is operated by JR Shikoku and has the station number "D28".

== Lines ==
The station is served by JR Shikoku's Dosan Line and is located 72.7 km from the beginning of the line at Tadotsu.

== Layout ==
The station, which is unstaffed, consists of two side platforms serving two tracks. A building adjacent to one platform serves as a waiting room. A footbridge connects to the other platform.

== Adjacent stations ==
«	Service	»
Dosan Line
Ōboke	-	Toyonaga

== History ==
The station opened on 28 November 1935 when the then Kōchi Line was extended northwards from Toyonaga to Minawa and the line was renamed the Dosan Line. At this time the station was operated by Japanese Government Railways, later becoming Japanese National Railways (JNR). With the privatization of JNR on 1 April 1987, control of the station passed to JR Shikoku.

== Surrounding area ==
- Japan National Route 32

== See also ==
- List of railway stations in Japan
