= Genkai =

Genkai may refer to:

- Genkai, Saga, a town in Saga Prefecture, Japan
- Genkai Sea or Genkainada, a sea in Japan
- Genkai (YuYu Hakusho), a fictional character in the anime and manga series YuYu Hakusho
- Genkai, a Japanese dictionary written by Otsuki Fumihiko
- Genkai shūraku, a term for Japanese villages that are in danger of disappearing
