= Toyonaga =

Toyonaga (written 豊永) is a Japanese surname. Notable people with the surname include:

- Toshiyuki Toyonaga (豊永 利行, born 1984), Japanese actor, voice actor and singer
- Yoko Toyonaga (豊永 陽子, born 1977), Japanese shot putter

== See also ==
- Toyonaga Station, a railway station in Kōchi Prefecture, Japan
