= Tosa-Kitagawa Station =

Railway station in Ōtoyo, Kōchi Prefecture, Japan

D33 Tosa-Kitagawa Station 土佐北川駅
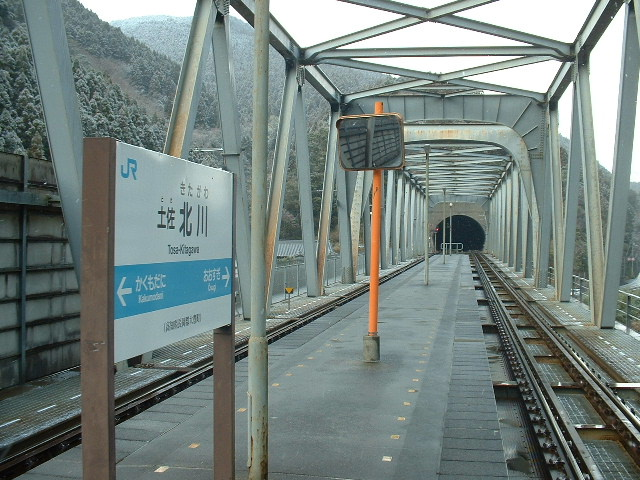
- Tosa-Kitagawa Station in 2007

General information
- Location: Kusunoki, Otoyo, Nagaoka-gun, Kōchi-ken 789-0324; Japan
- Coordinates: 33°42′53″N 133°41′11″E
- Operator: JR Shikoku
- Line: ■ Dosan Line
- Distance: 93.3 km from Tadotsu
- Platforms: 1 island platform
- Tracks: 2

Construction
- Accessible: No - steps lead up to platform

Other information
- Station code: D33

History
- Opened: 1 October 1960

Passengers
- FY2019: 4
Location
- Location within Kochi Prefecture Location within Japan

Tosa-Kitagawa Station (土佐北川駅, Tosa-Kitagawa-eki) is a passenger railway station located in the town of Ōtoyo, Nagaoka District, Kōchi Prefecture, Japan. It is operated by JR Shikoku and has the station number "D33".

== Lines ==
The station is served by the JR Shikoku Dosan Line and is located 93.3 km from the beginning of the line at Tadotsu.

== Layout ==
The station, which is unstaffed, consists of a narrow island platform serving two tracks all mounted on an iron bridge spanning the Ananai River. From both the north and south ends of the bridge, stairs lead up to a pedestrian walkway along the length of the bridge which gives access to the platform. At an intermediate landing up the steps on the south side, a waiting room has been established.

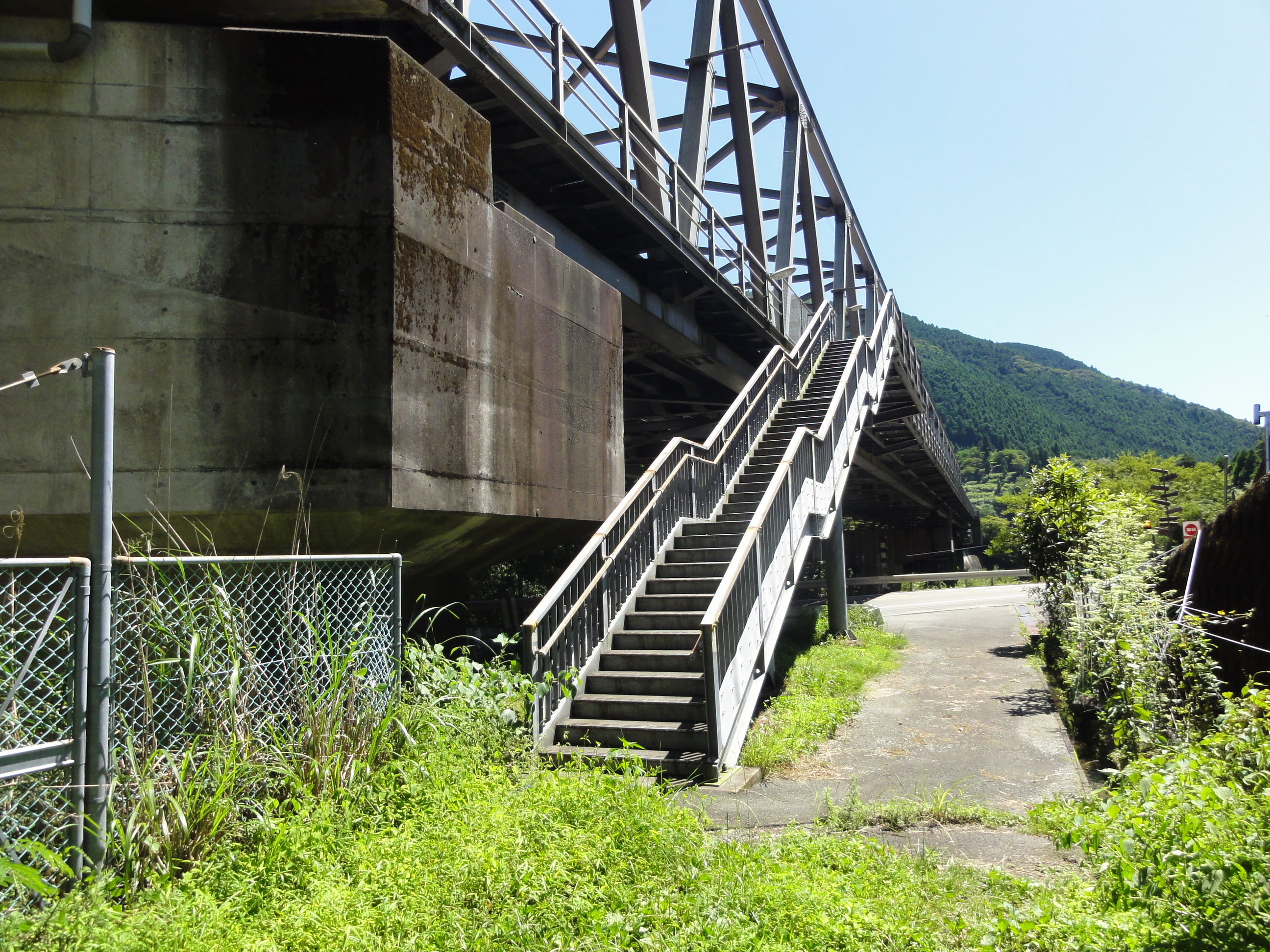
Station entrance on the north side of the bridge. The stairs lead to a walkway which runs along the length of the bridge.

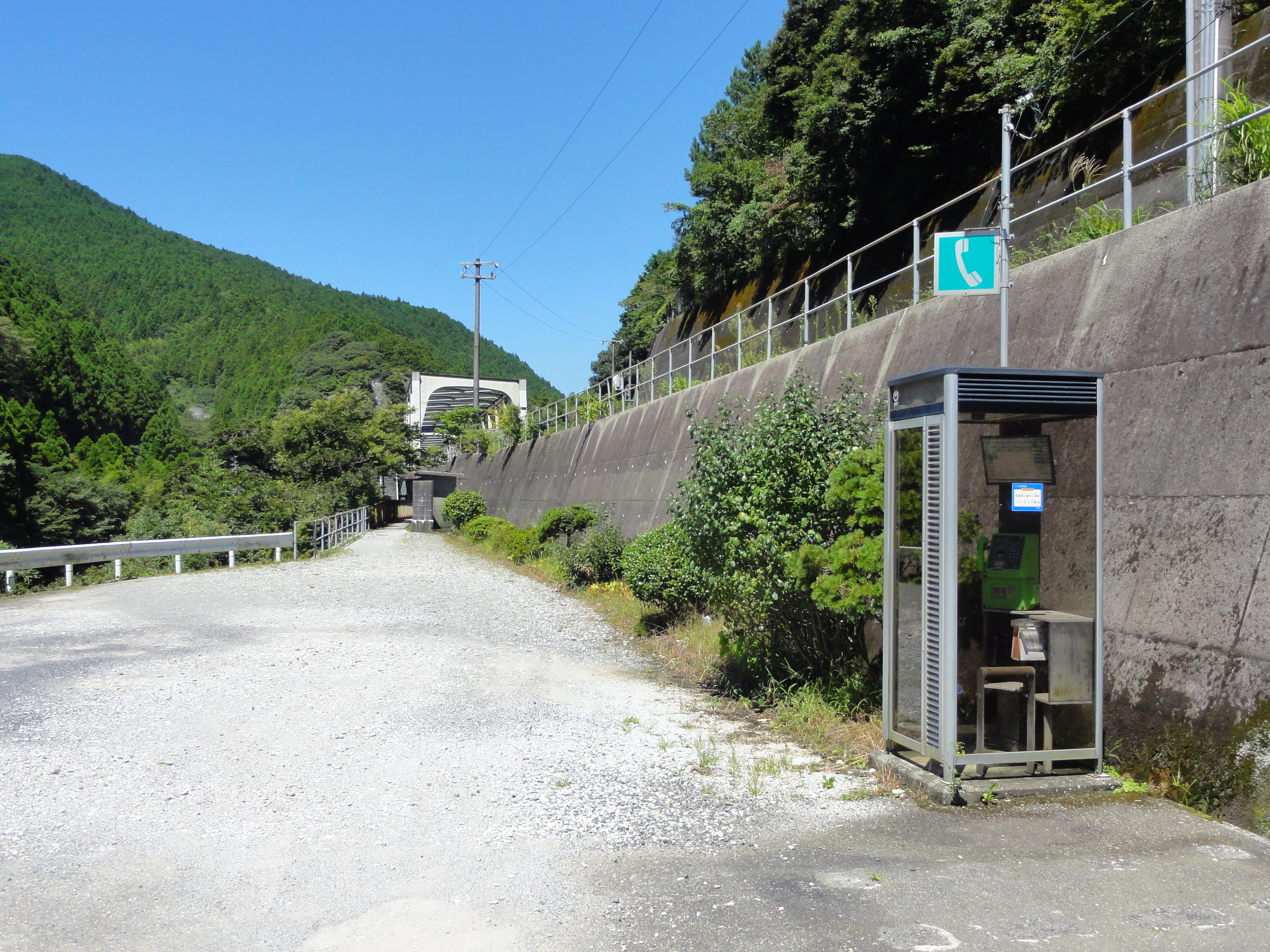
Access to the entrance on the south side of the bridge is via a gravel footpath. A public telephone call box has been installed. A toilet building can also be seen in the background.

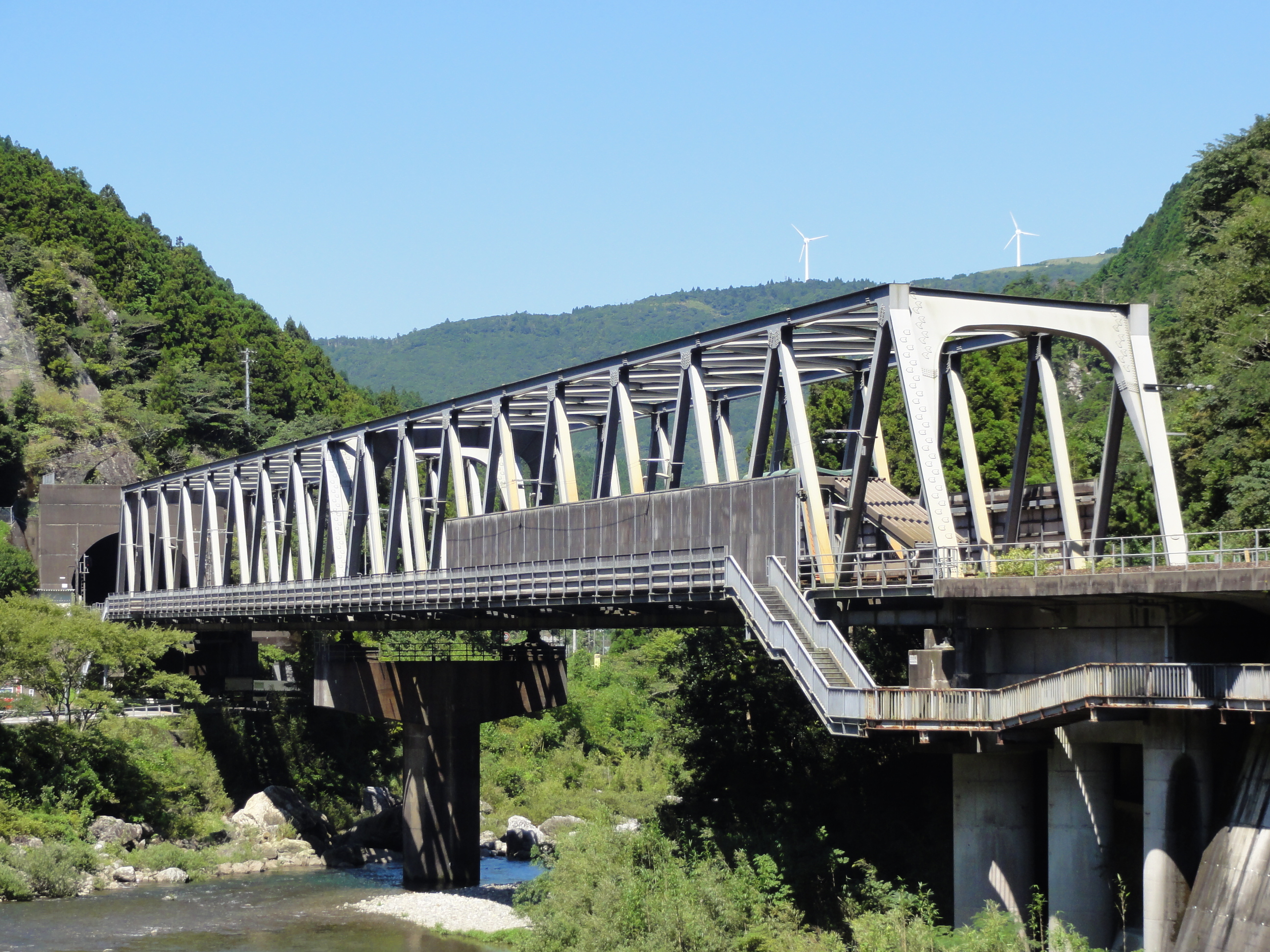
The stairs on the south side lead up to the walkway along the bridge.

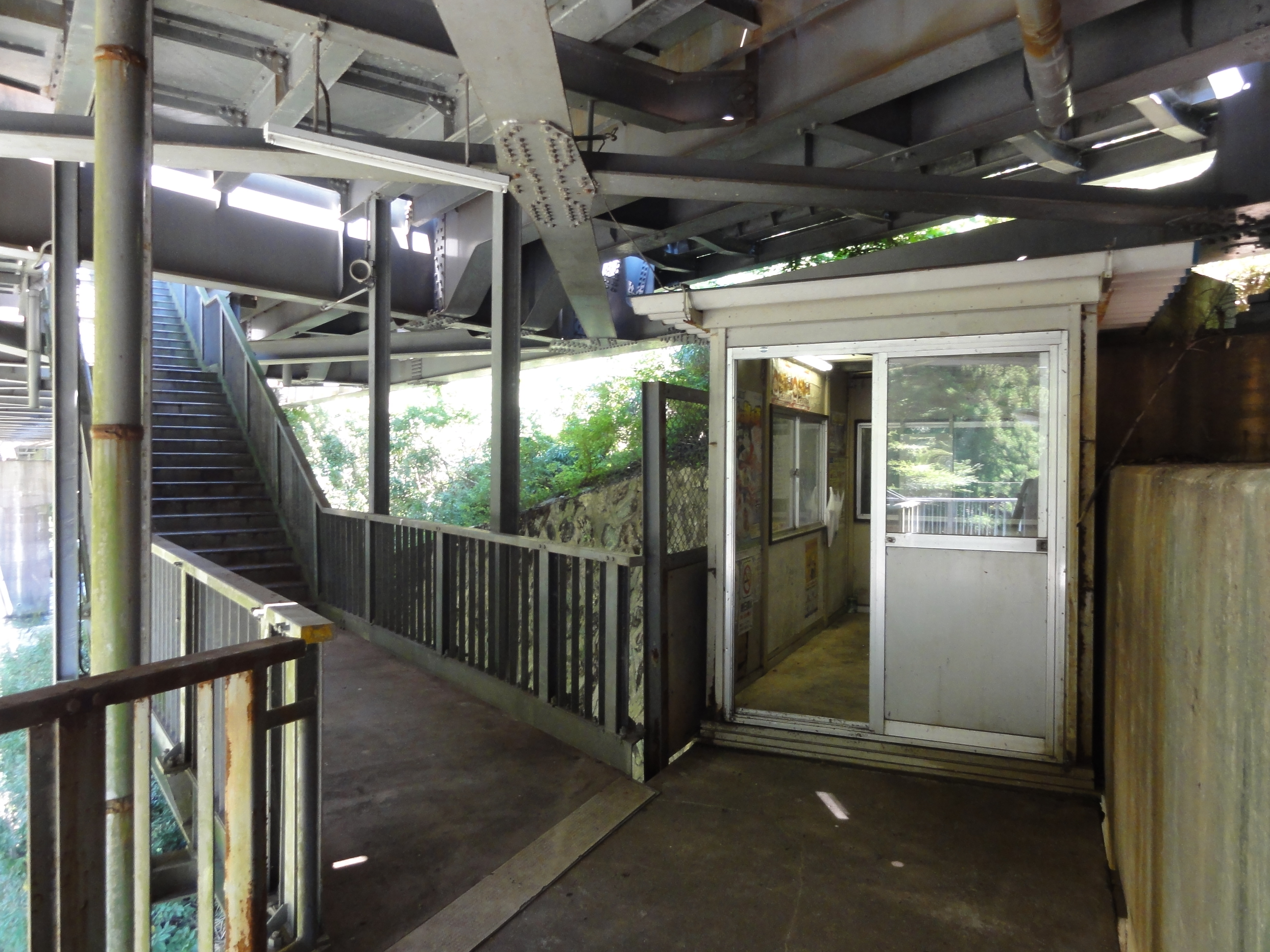
At a landing under the bridge on the south side, a waiting room has been installed.

== Adjacent stations ==
«	Service	»
Dosan Line
Ōsugi	-	Kakumodani

== History ==
The station opened on 1 October 1960 on the existing Dosan Line but at a different location further to the south. After track re-alignment works, the station was moved to its present location on 3 March 1986. At this time the station was operated by Japanese Government Railways, later becoming Japanese National Railways (JNR). With the privatization of JNR on 1 April 1987, control of the station passed to JR Shikoku.

== Surrounding area ==
- Japan National Route 32

== See also ==
- List of railway stations in Japan
