= Shigetō Station =

Railway station in Kami, Kōchi Prefecture, Japan

Shigetō Station 繁藤駅
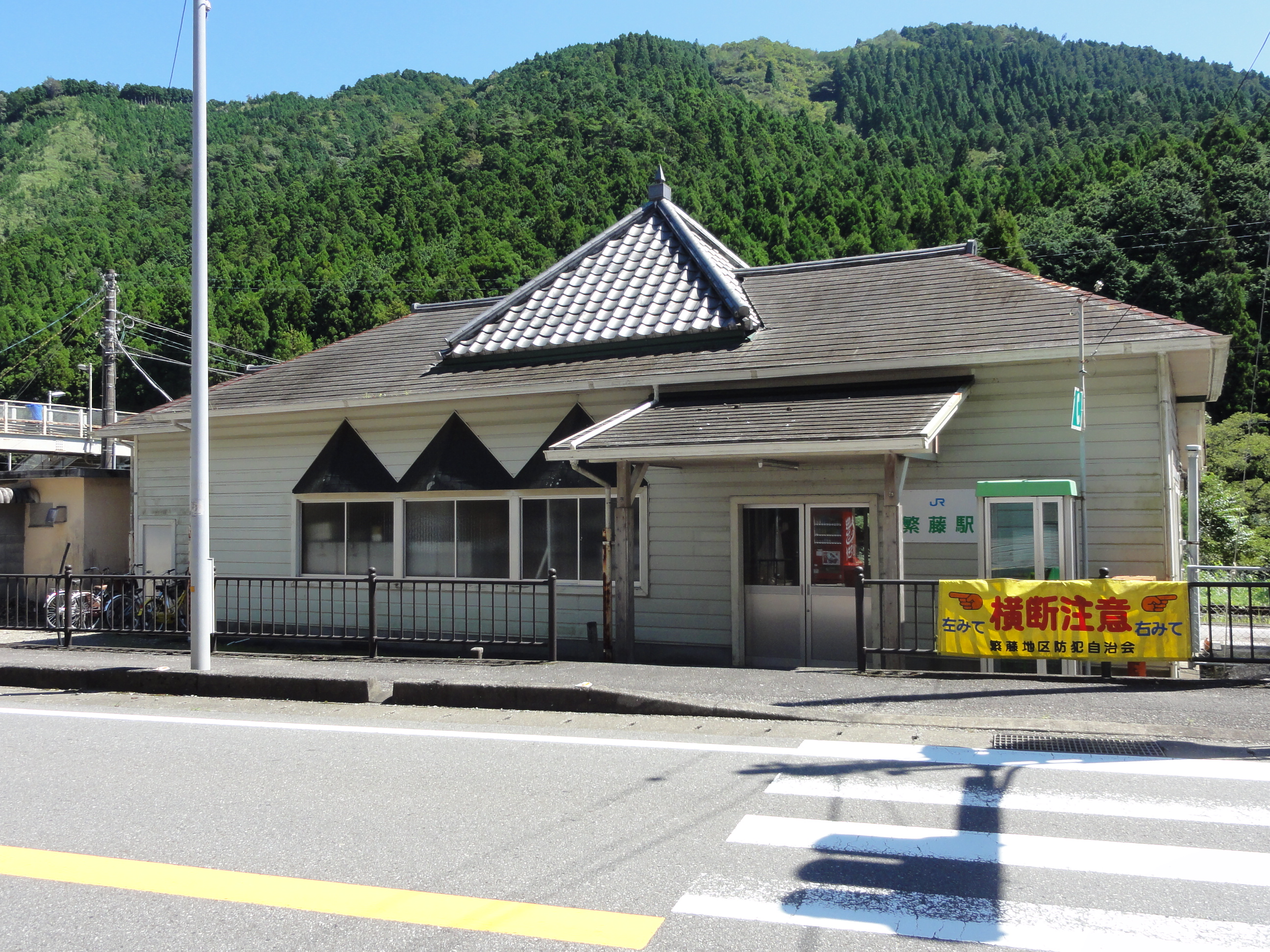
- Shigetō Station in 2011

General information
- Location: Tosayamadacho Shigetō, Kami-shi, Kōchi-ken 789-0585; Japan
- Coordinates: 33°40′49″N 133°41′25″E
- Operator: JR Shikoku
- Line: ■ Dosan Line
- Distance: 97.6 km from Tadotsu
- Platforms: 1 side + 1 island platform
- Tracks: 3 + 1 siding

Construction
- Accessible: No - overhead footbridge needed to access the island platform

Other information
- Status: unstaffed
- Station code: D35

History
- Opened: 21 June 1930
- Former names: Amatsubo (until 1963)

Passengers
- FY2019: 10
Location
- Location within Kochi Prefecture Location within Japan

Shigetō Station (繁藤駅, Shigetō-eki) is a passenger railway station located in the city of Kami, Kōchi Prefecture, Japan. It is operated by JR Shikoku and has the station number "D35".

== Lines ==
The station is served by the JR Shikoku Dosan Line and is located 97.6 km from the beginning of the line at Tadotsu.

== Layout ==
The station consists of a side platform and an island platform serving three tracks, as illustrated below.

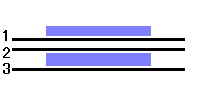
←:for Shingai	→:for Kakumodani

Linked to the side platform is a small building which is unstaffed and serves only as a waiting room. A footbridge connects the side platform to the island platform, which has a weather shelter. A short siding juts partially into the other side of the side platform.

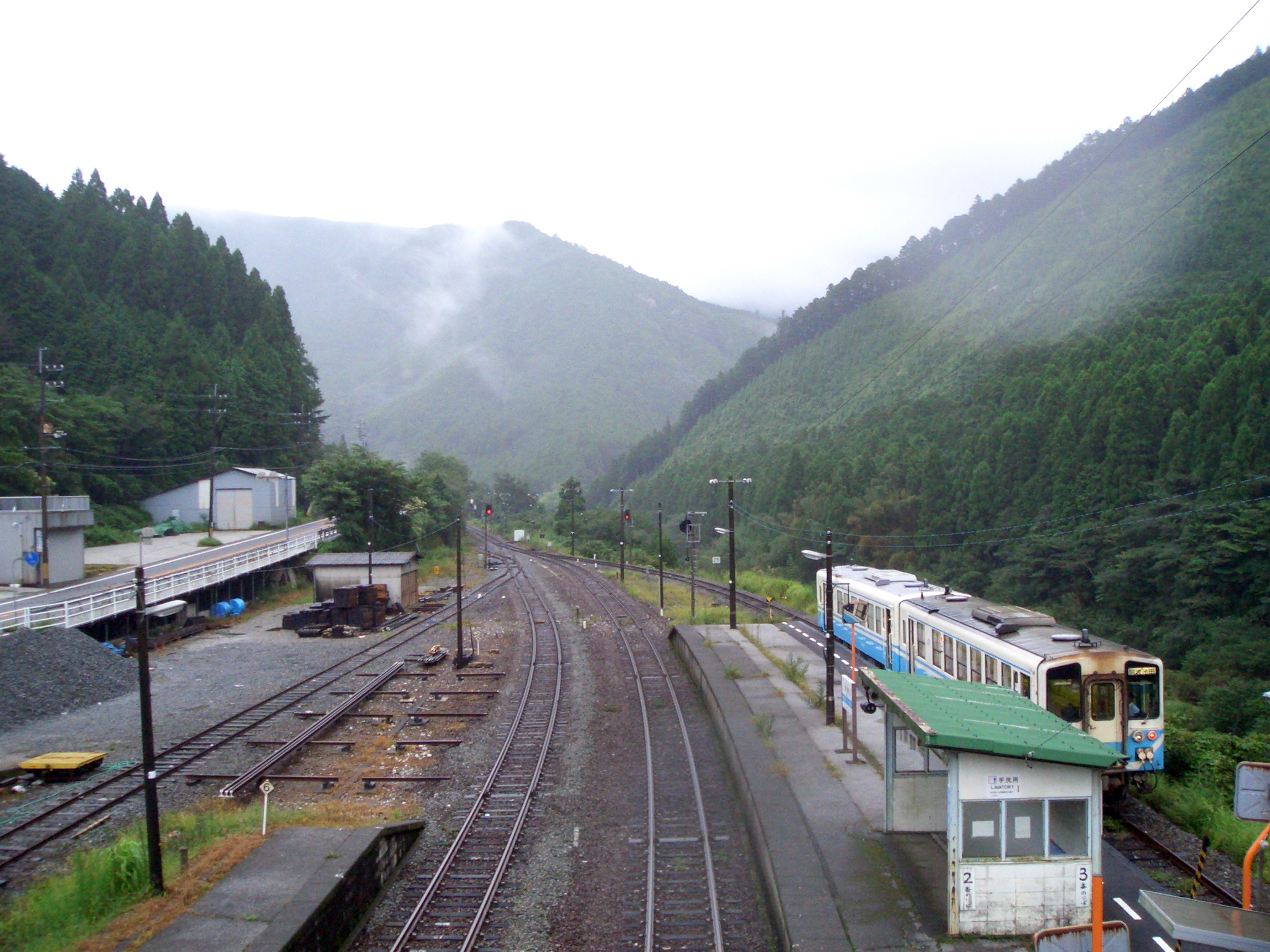
A view in the direction of Kakumodani. Note the deep ravine to the right.

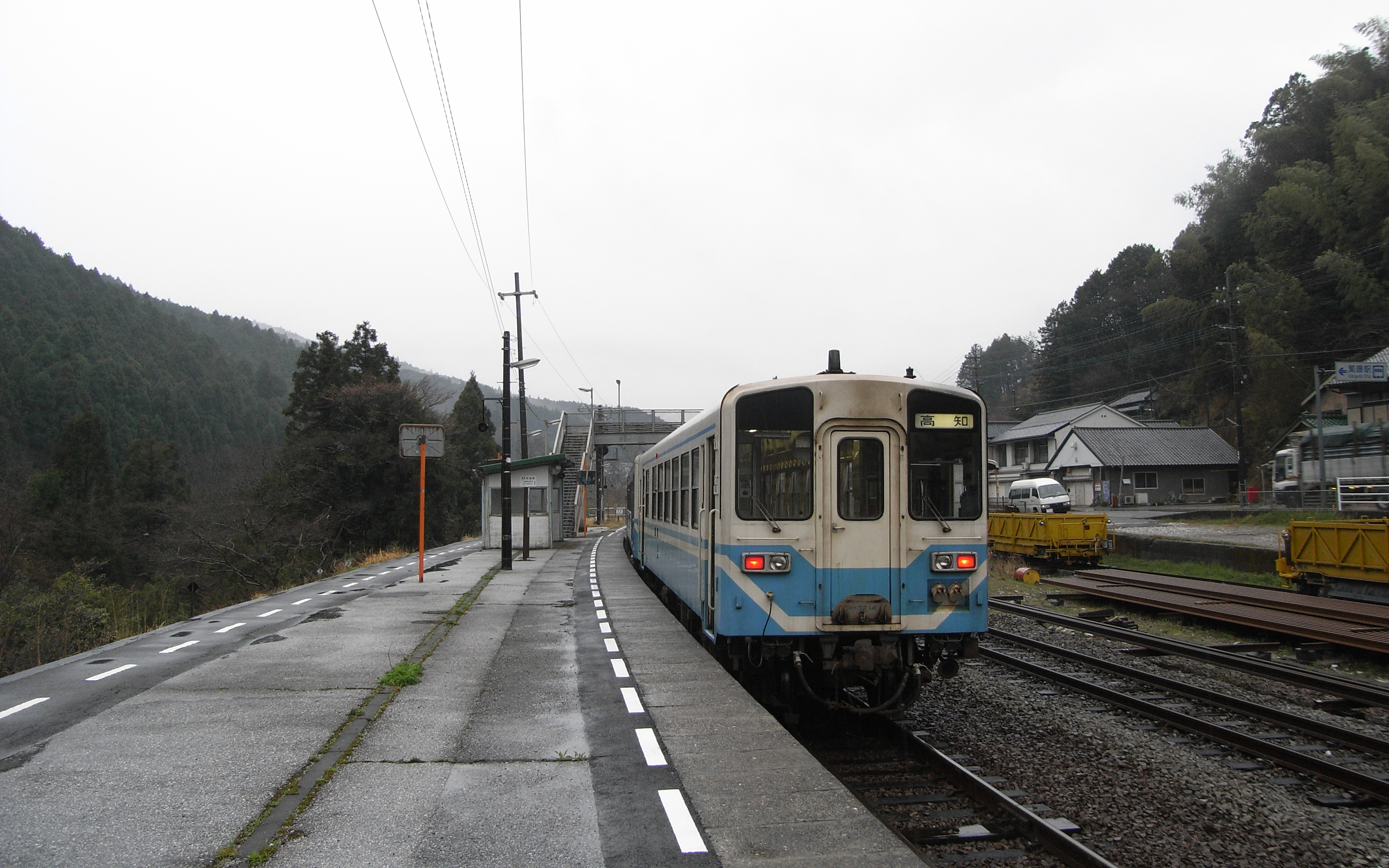
Another view, this time in the direction of Shingai. Note the footbridge in the background.

== Adjacent stations ==
«	Service	»
Dosan Line
Kakumodani	-	Shingai

== History ==
The station opened on 21 June 1930 when the then Kōchi Line was extended northwards from Tosa-Yamada to Kakumodani. At this time it was named Amatsubo Station (天坪駅) and was operated by Japanese Government Railways (JGR), later becoming Japanese National Railways (JNR). On 1 October 1963, it was renamed Shigetō. With the privatization of JNR on 1 April 1987, control of the station passed to JR Shikoku.

On 5 July 1972, what became known as the "Shigetō disaster" occurred. Torrential rain over several days led to a series of landslides which engulfed part of the station and surrounding houses. Two locomotives and two passenger carriages were swept into the river valley below with some of the vehicles being carried onto the opposite bank. There were 60 deaths and the damage to the Dosan Line took 23 days to repair.

== Surrounding area ==
- Kami City Shigeto Branch Office
- Hokigamine Forest Park
- Ananaigawa Dam

== See also ==
- List of railway stations in Japan
