= Ōtoyo, Kōchi =

Ōtoyo 大豊町
- Town
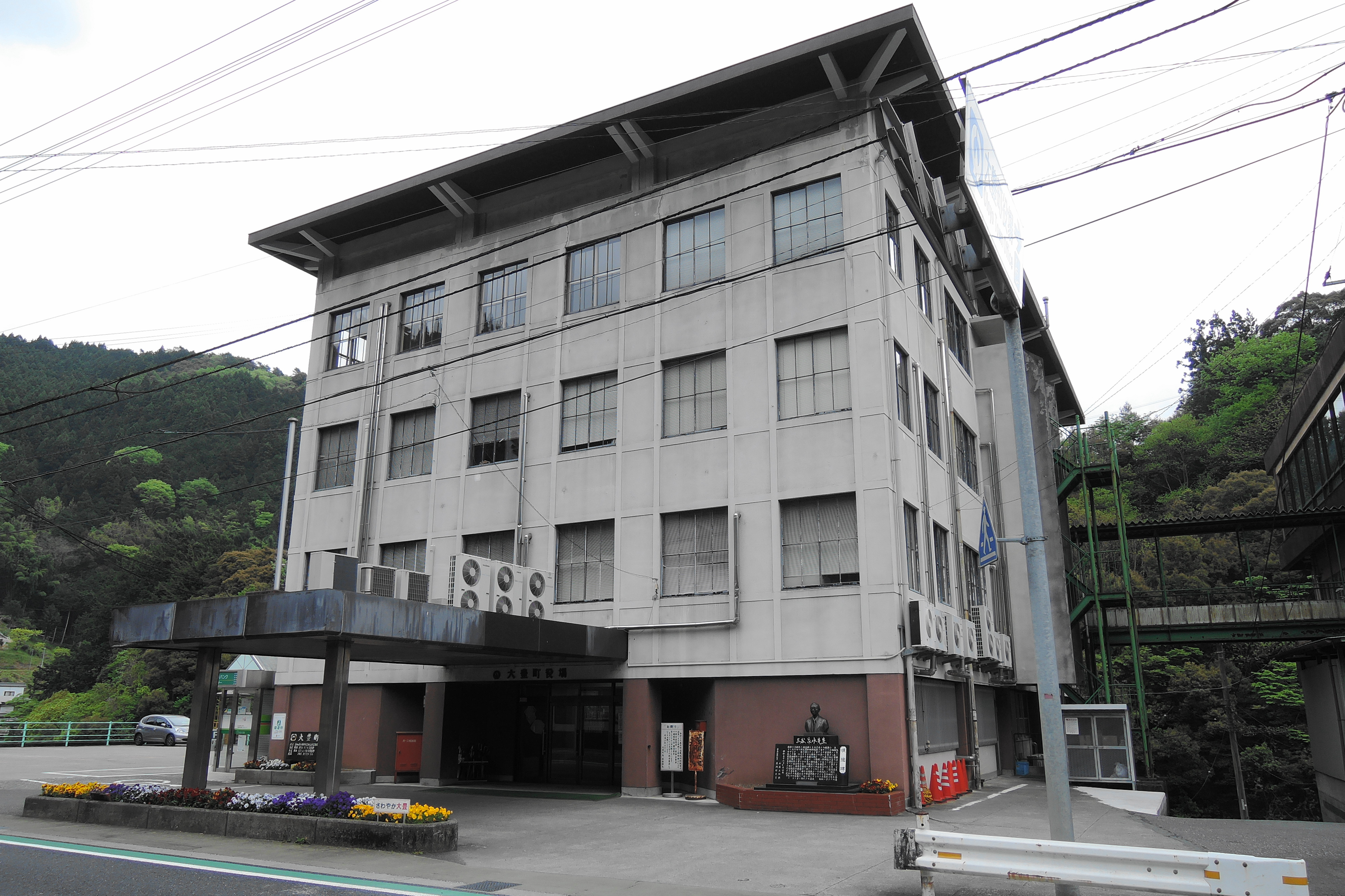
- Otoyo town hall

- Flag Seal
- Location of Ōtoyo in Kōchi Prefecture

- Location in Japan
- Coordinates: 33°46′N 133°40′E
- Country: Japan
- Region: Shikoku
- Prefecture: Kōchi
- District: Nagaoka

Area
  - Total: 315.06 km^{2} (121.65 sq mi)

Population (August 1, 2022)
  - Total: 3,277
  - Density: 10.40/km^{2} (26.94/sq mi)
- Time zone: UTC+09:00 (JST)
- City hall address: 231 Takasu, Ōtoyo-chō, Nagaoka-gun, Kōchi-ken 789-0392
- Website: Official website
- Symbols
- Bird: Varied tit
- Flower: Adonis
- Tree: Japanese cedar

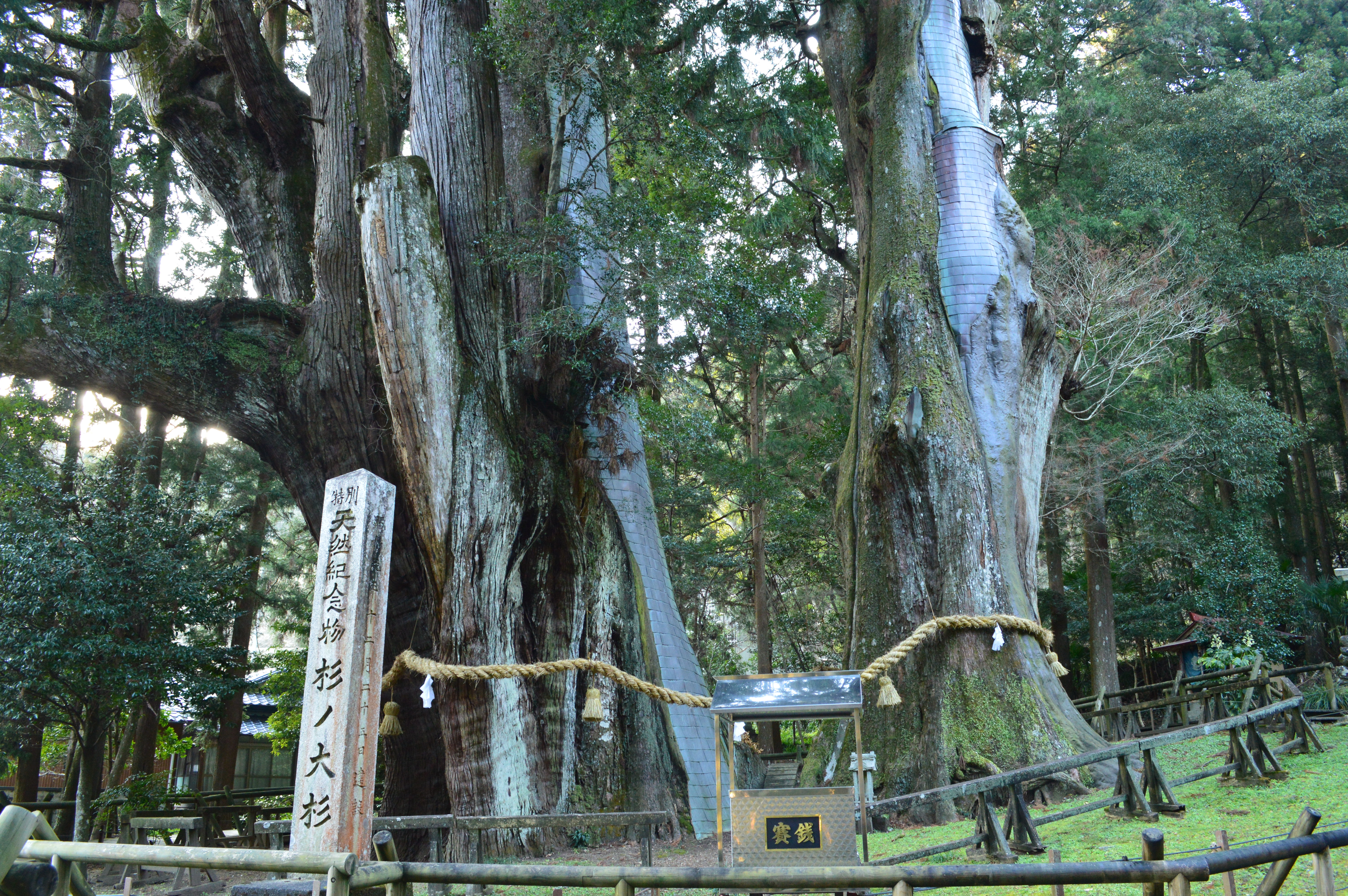
Sugi no Osugi

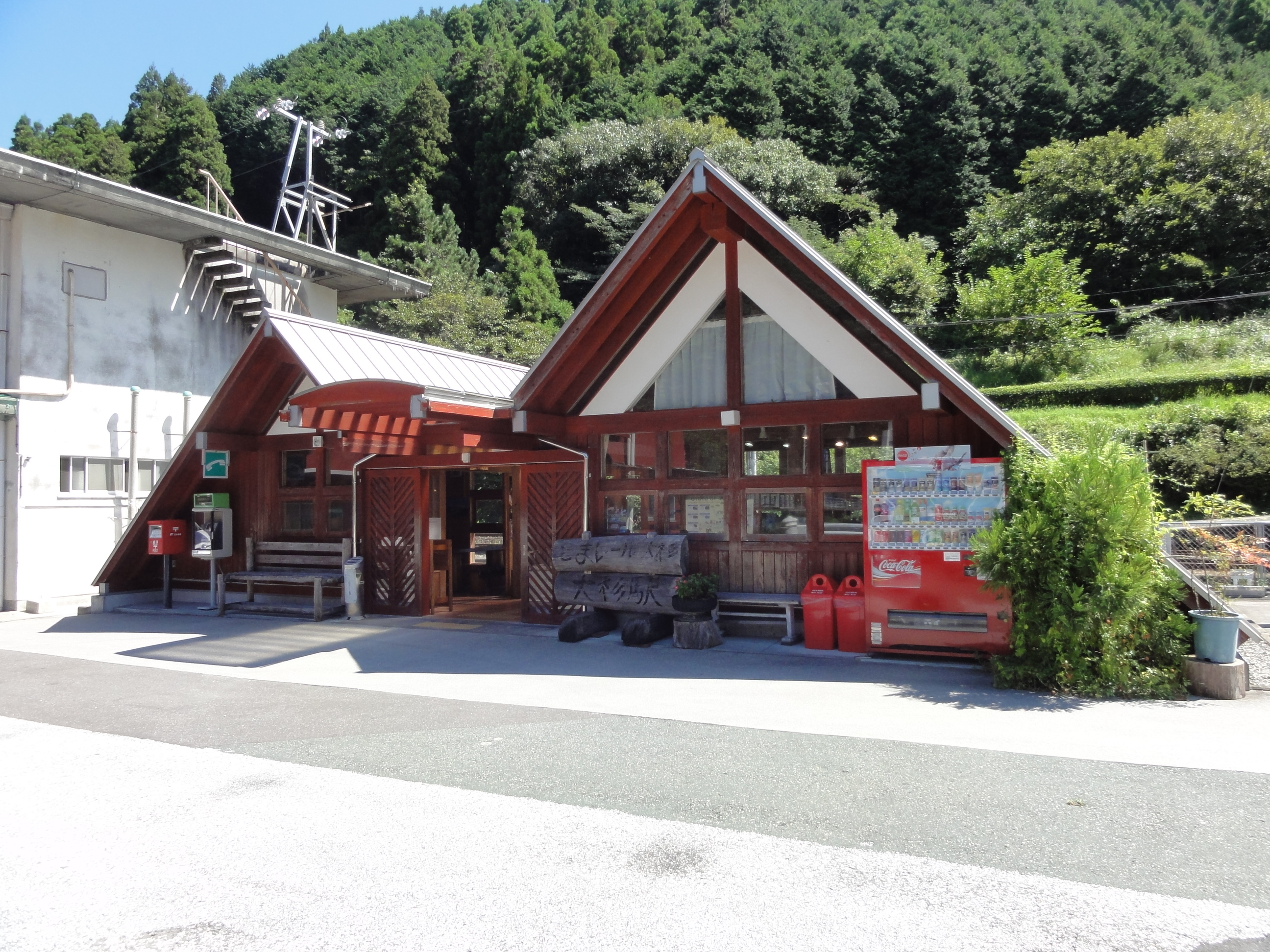
Ōsugi Station

Ōtoyo (大豊町, Ōtoyo-chō) is a town located in Nagaoka District, Kōchi Prefecture, Japan. As of 1 August 2022, the town had an estimated population of 3277 in 1968 households and a population density of 10 persons per km^{2}. The total area of the town is 315.06 square kilometres (121.65 sq mi).

== Geography ==
Ōtoyo is located in northeastern Kōchi Prefecture on the island of Shikoku. The Yoshino River and the Ananai River flow through the town, which extends 32 kilometers from east to west and 28 kilometers from north to south. The elevation is between 200 and 1,400 meters.

=== Neighbouring municipalities ===
Ehime Prefecture

- Shikokuchūō

Kōchi Prefecture

- Kami
- Motoyama

Tokushima Prefecture

- Miyoshi

=== Climate ===
Ōtoyo has a humid subtropical climate (Köppen Cfa) characterized by warm summers and cool winters with light snowfall. There are significant differences in the weather depending on the topography. but since Ōtoyo is a heavy rainfall area in general, the annual rainfall reaches 3,000mm in some places, causing landslides and other disasters. The annual average temperature is 14 °C.

== Demographics ==
Per Japanese census data, the population of Ōtoyo has declined precipitously since the 1960s. It is the only municipality in Shikoku where over 50% of the population is aged over 65, therefore qualifying as a genkai shūraku.

Historical population
Year	Pop.	±%
1960	18,231	—
1970	12,440	−31.8%
1980	9,411	−24.3%
1990	7,760	−17.5%
2000	6,378	−17.8%
2010	4,719	−26.0%
2020	3,252	−31.1%

== History ==
As with all of Kōchi Prefecture, the area of Ōtoyo was part of ancient Tosa Province. During the Edo period, the area was part of the holdings of Tosa Domain ruled by the Yamauchi clan from their seat at Kōchi Castle. The area was organized into villages within Nagaoka District with the creation of the modern municipalities system on April 1, 1889, including Higashitoyonaga, Nishitoyonaga, Ōsugi, and Tentsubo. These four villages merged on March 31, 1955, to form the village of Ōtoyo. The name Ōtoyo came from taking the Ō (大) in Ōsugi (大杉, Ōsugi) and the Toyo (豊, Toyo) in Toyonaga (豊永, Toyonaga). Following this, a section of Ōtoyo was absorbed into the town of Tosayamada (present day Kami, Kōchi). On the April 1, 1972, the village became a town.

== Government ==
Ōtoyo has a mayor-council form of government with a directly elected mayor and a unicameral town council of ten members. Ōtoyo, together with the other municipalities of Nagaoka and Tosa Districts, contributes one member to the Kōchi Prefectural Assembly. In terms of national politics, the town is part of Kōchi 1st district of the lower house of the Diet of Japan.

== Economy ==
The economy of Ōtoyo is centered on forestry.

== Education ==
Ōtoyo has one public combined elementary/middle school operated by the town government. The town does not have a high school.

== Transportation ==
=== Railway ===
JR Shikoku - Dosan Line

- Tosa-Iwahara - Toyonaga - Ōtaguchi -Tosa-Ananai - Ōsugi - Tosa-Kitagawa - Kakumodani

=== Highways ===
- Kōchi Expressway
- National Route 32
- National Route 439
- National Route 492

== Local attractions ==
=== Historic sites ===
- Buraku-ji, Buddhist temple whose Yakushi-do is a National Important Cultural Property
- Former Tajikawa Domain Bansho Shoin, National Important Cultural Property

=== Events ===
- Fukujuso Flower Festival
- Osugi Summer Festival
- Otaguchi Summer Festival
- Wild Game Festival

=== Tourist sites ===
- Sugi no Osugi (杉の大スギ, Sugi-no-Osugi), Special Natural Monument
- Whitewater Rafting - Due to its prime location on the Yoshino River and its proximity to Oboke Gorge Otoyo is the location of a large number of rafting companies.
- Yutoristo Park (ゆとりすとパークおおとよ, Yutorisuto Koen)
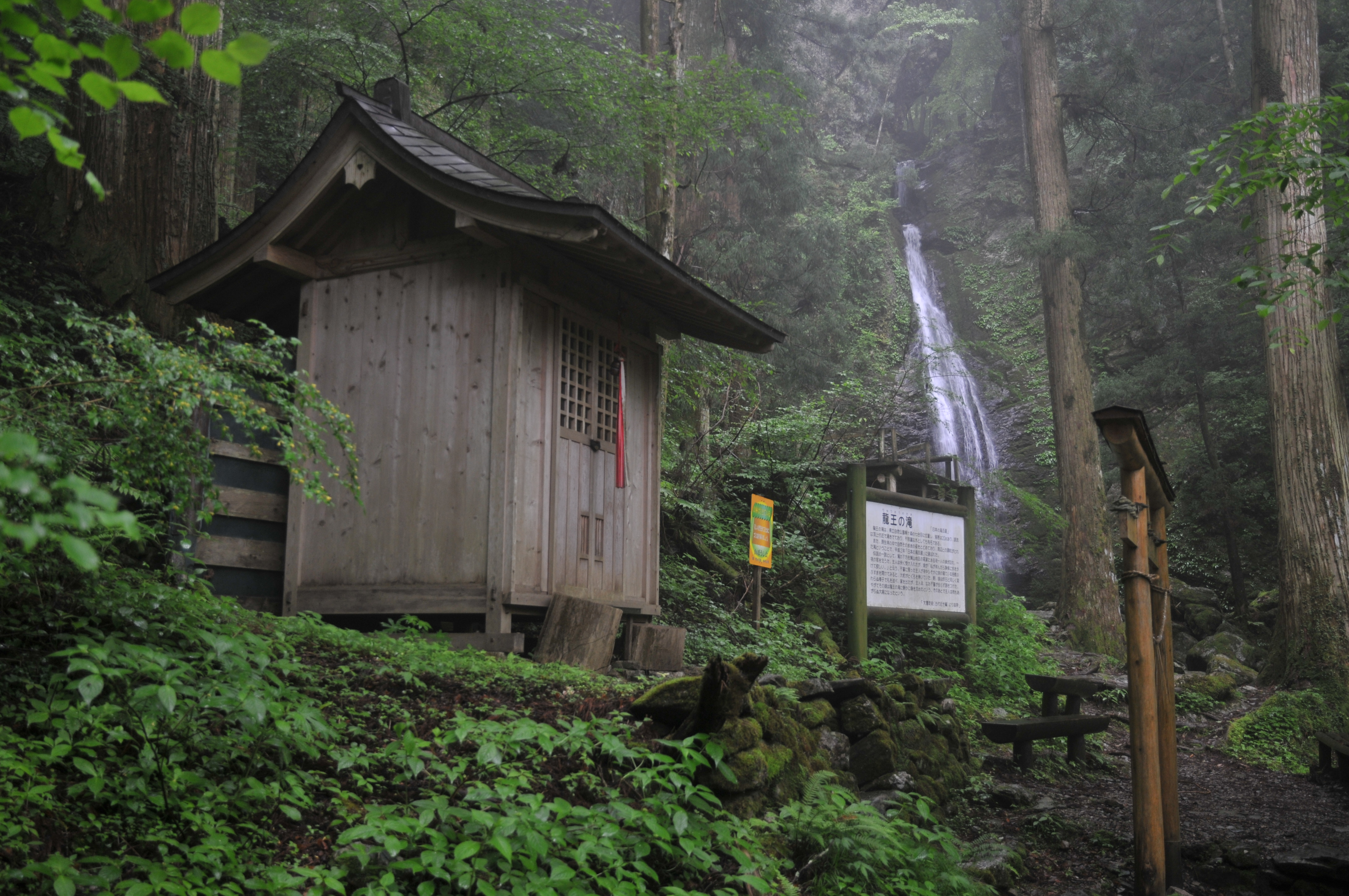
Ryūjin shrine and Ryūō falls

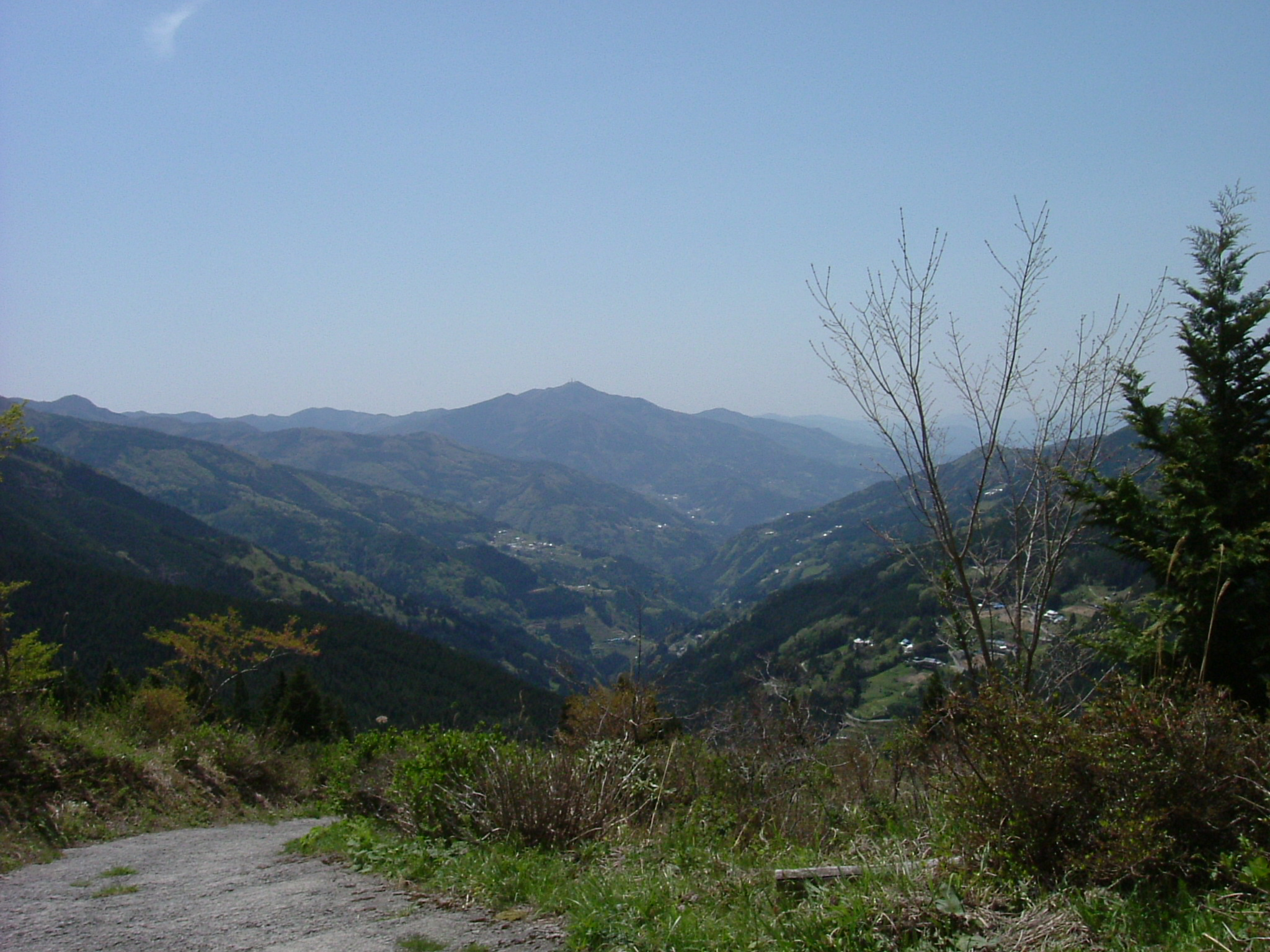
Mount Kajigamori

=== Local products ===
- Goishicha (fermented tea)
- Yuzu lemon juice
- Wild Game

== Notable people from Ōtoyo ==
- Masaya Tokuhiro, manga artist
- Tomoyuki Yamashita, general in the Imperial Japanese Army
