= Kakumodani Station =

Railway station in Ōtoyo, Kōchi Prefecture, Japan

D34 Kakumodani Station 角茂谷駅
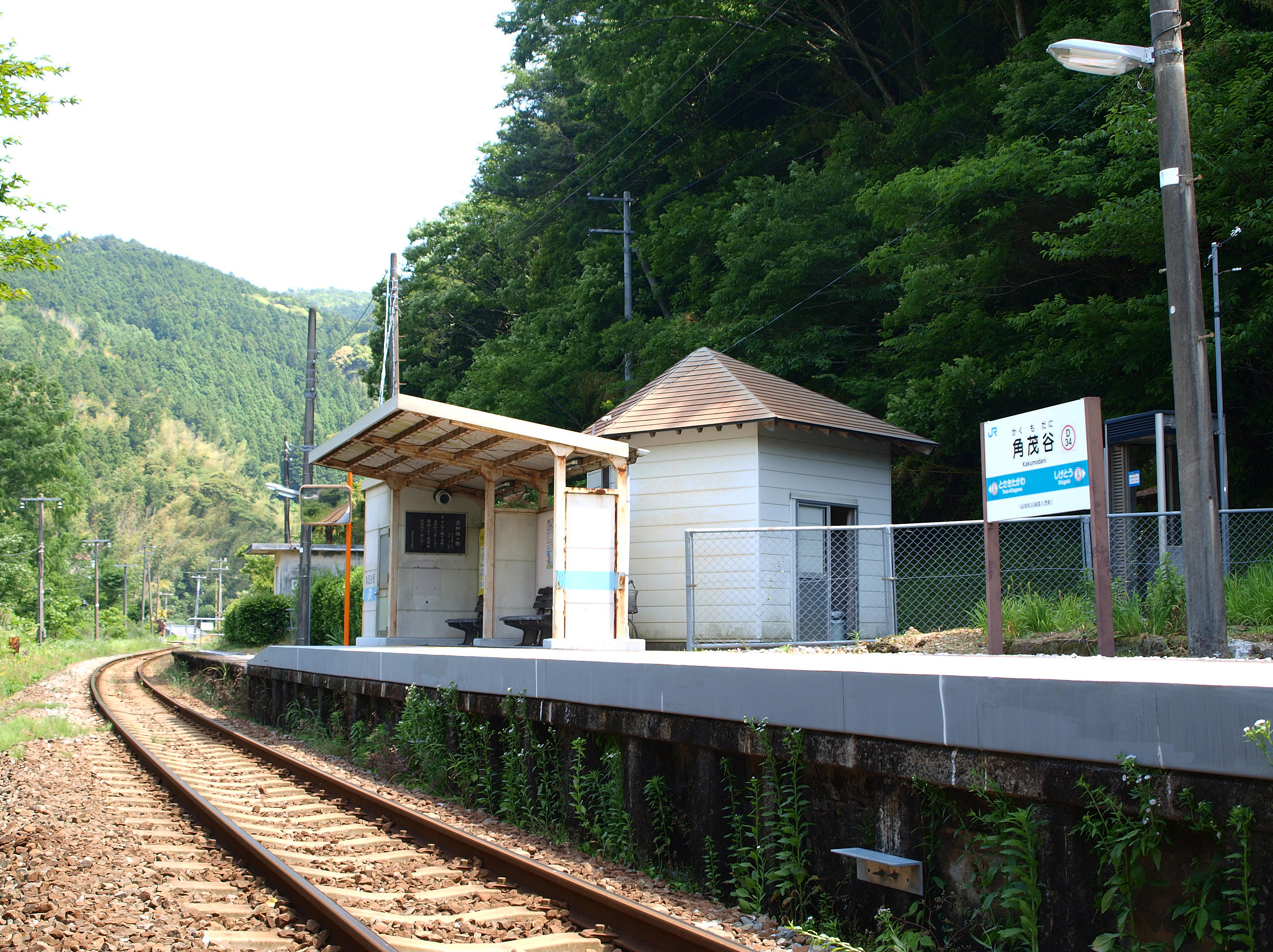
- Kakumodani Station in 2010

General information
- Location: Kakumodani, Ōtoyo-chō, Nagaoka-gun, Kōchi-ken 789-0321; Japan
- Coordinates: 33°41′44″N 133°41′32″E
- Operator: JR Shikoku
- Line: ■ Dosan Line
- Distance: 95.5 km from Tadotsu
- Platforms: 1 side platform
- Tracks: 1

Other information
- Status: unstaffed
- Station code: D34

History
- Opened: 21 June 1930

Passengers
- FY2019: 8
Location
- Location within Kochi Prefecture Location within Japan

Kakumodani Station (角茂谷駅, Kakumodani-eki) is a passenger railway station located in the town of Ōtoyo, Nagaoka District, Kōchi Prefecture, Japan. It is operated by JR Shikoku and has the station number "D34".

== Lines ==
The station is served by the JR Shikoku Dosan Line and is located 95.5 km from the beginning of the line at Tadotsu.

== Layout ==
The station, which is unstaffed, consists of a side platform serving a single track. There is a shelter on the platform and another small building behind the platform which serves as a waiting room.

== Adjacent stations ==
«	Service	»
Dosan Line
Tosa-Kitagawa	-	Shigetō

== History ==
The station opened on 21 June 1930 as the terminus of the then Kōchi Line which had been extended northwards from Tosa-Yamada. At this time the station was operated by Japanese Government Railways, later becoming Japanese National Railways (JNR). With the privatization of JNR on 1 April 1987, control of the station passed to JR Shikoku.

== Surrounding area ==
- Otoyo Municipal Tentsubo Elementary School (currently closed)

== See also ==
- List of railway stations in Japan
