= Shingai Station =

Railway station in Kami, Kōchi Prefecture, Japan

Shingai Station 新改駅
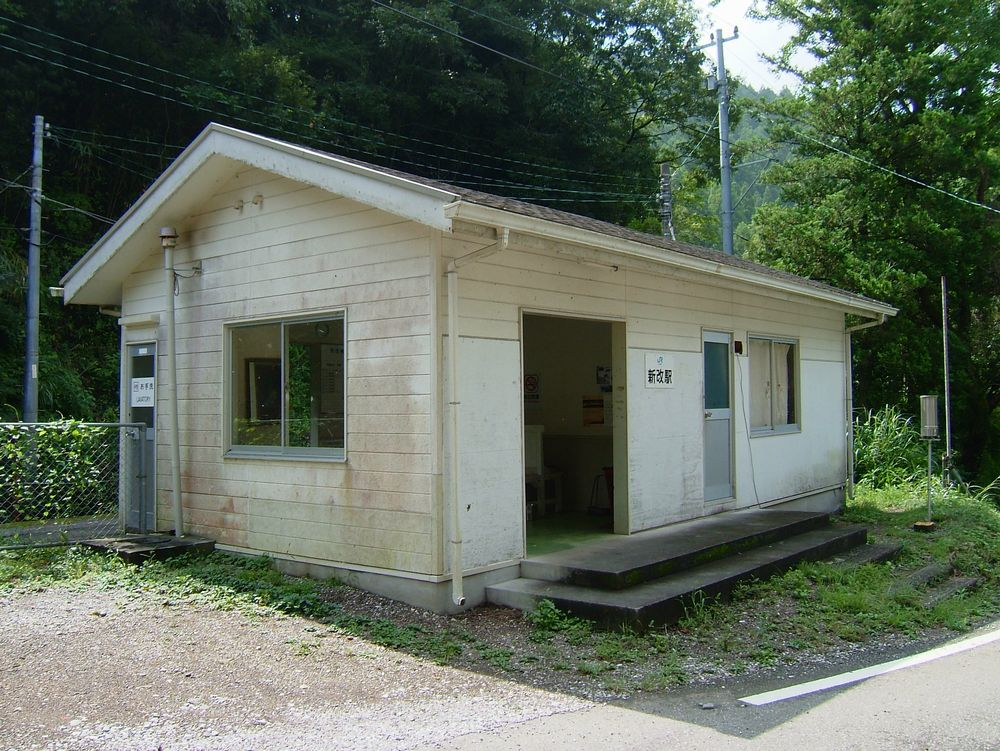
- The station waiting room in November 2006

General information
- Location: Tosayamadacho Higashigawa, Kami, Kōchi Prefecture 782-0063; Japan
- Coordinates: 33°38′57″N 133°41′42″E
- Operator: JR Shikoku
- Line: ■ Dosan Line
- Distance: 103.9 km from Tadotsu
- Platforms: 1 side platform
- Tracks: 1

Other information
- Status: Unstaffed
- Station code: D36

History
- Opened: 1 June 1947
- Former names: Shinkai (until 1956)
Location
- Location within Kochi Prefecture Location within Japan

Shingai Station (新改駅, Shingai-eki) is a passenger railway station located in the city of Kami, Kōchi Prefecture, Japan. It is operated by JR Shikoku and has the station number "D36".

== Lines ==
The station is served by the JR Shikoku Dosan Line and is located 103.9 km from the beginning of the line at Tadotsu.

== Layout ==
Shingai Station is one of two stations with switchback layout in Shikoku, the other being Tsubojiri. The single side platform is on a siding located in the middle of a 25‰ gradient. Trains from Tosa-Yamada first enter the siding with the platform. Trains then reverse to the other siding, change direction again, and enter the main line toward Shigetō. Trains that do not stop at the station do not use the sidings.

The station is unstaffed. A small building connected to the side platform serves as a waiting room.

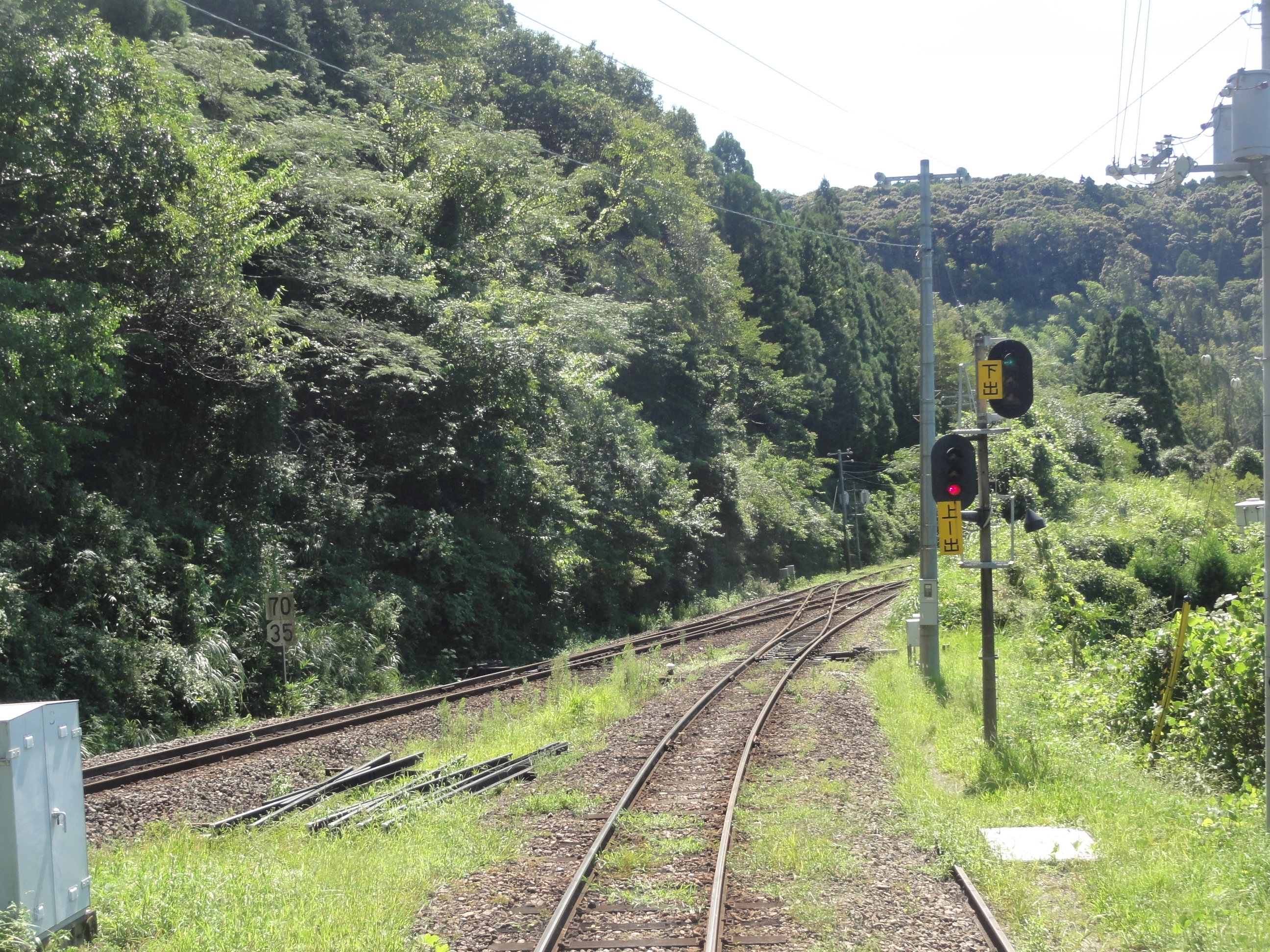
View from the platform; the track in the middle from left to right is the main line.

== Adjacent stations ==
«	Service	»
Dosan Line
Shigetō	-	Tosa-Yamada

== History ==
Shinkai Signalbox (新改信号場) opened on 28 November 1935, and was converted to a passenger station on 1 June 1947. In preparation for the US invasion of the Japanese home islands, the area around Shinkai Signalbox was designated as a key point for the line of communication and was made into a military fortress. As the mountainous area was deemed a natural fortress, important facilities such as the Shikoku Military District Headquarters were temporarily established here. During the brief period until the end of the war, Shinkai Signalbox unexpectedly became the center of Kōchi prefecture.

The station name in hiragana was changed from Shinkai (しんかい) to Shingai (しんがい), with no change of kanji script, on 15 December 1956. With the privatization of Japanese National Railways (JNR) on 1 April 1987, the station came under the control of JR Shikoku.

== Surrounding area ==
- Yasuba Dam

== See also ==
- List of railway stations in Japan
