= Yamada-Nishimachi Station =

Railway station in Kami, Kōchi Prefecture, Japan

Yamada-Nishimachi Station 山田西町駅
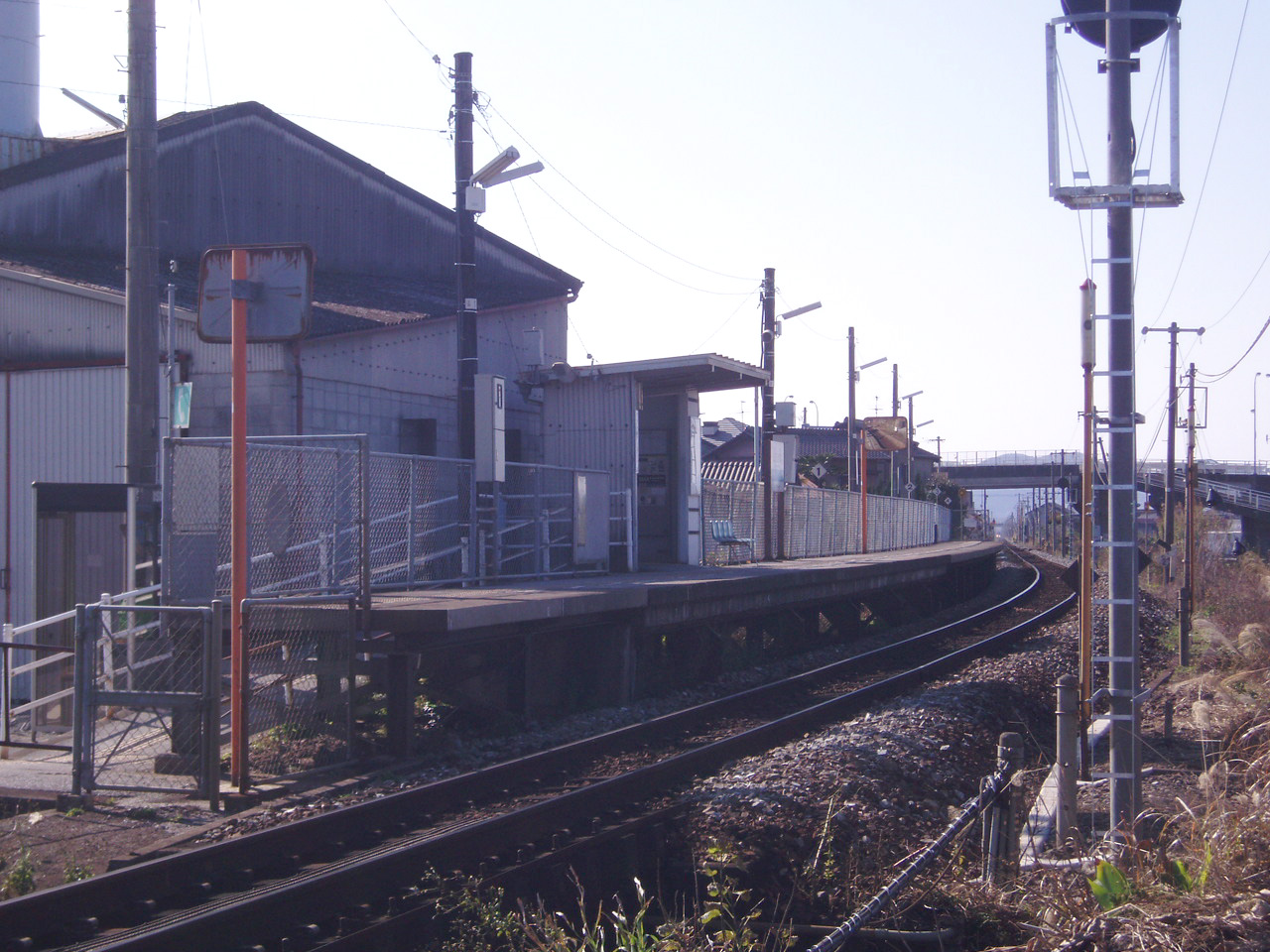
- Yamada-Nishimachi Station in 2006

General information
- Location: Tosayamadachō Sakaemachi, Kami-shi, Kōchi-ken 782-0039; Japan
- Coordinates: 33°36′17″N 133°40′39″E
- Operator: JR Shikoku
- Line: ■ Dosan Line
- Distance: 112.1 km from Tadotsu
- Platforms: 1 side platform
- Tracks: 1

Construction
- Accessible: Yes - ramp from access road to platform

Other information
- Status: Unstaffed
- Station code: D38

History
- Opened: 27 January 1952

Passengers
- FY2019: 536
Location
- Location within Kochi Prefecture Location within Japan

Yamada-Nishimachi Station (山田西町駅, Yamada-Nishimachi-eki) is a passenger railway station located in the city of Kami, Kōchi Prefecture, Japan. It is operated by JR Shikoku and has the station number "D38".

== Lines ==
The station is served by the JR Shikoku Dosan Line and is located 112.1 km from the beginning of the line at Tadotsu.

== Layout ==
The station, which is unstaffed, consists of a side platform serving a single track. There is a shelter on the platform for waiting passengers. A ramp leads up to the platform from the access road.

== Adjacent stations ==
| « | Service | » |
Dosan Line
| Tosa-Yamada | - | Tosa-Nagaoka |

== History ==
The station opened on 27 January 1952 as a new station on the existing Dosan Line. At that time the station was operated by Japanese National Railways (JNR). With the privatization of JNR on 1 April 1987, control of the station passed to JR Shikoku.

== Surrounding area ==
The station is located in a residential area.

== See also ==
- List of railway stations in Japan
