= Tosa-Nagaoka Station =

Railway station in Nankoku, Kōchi Prefecture, Japan

Tosa-Nagaoka Station 土佐長岡駅
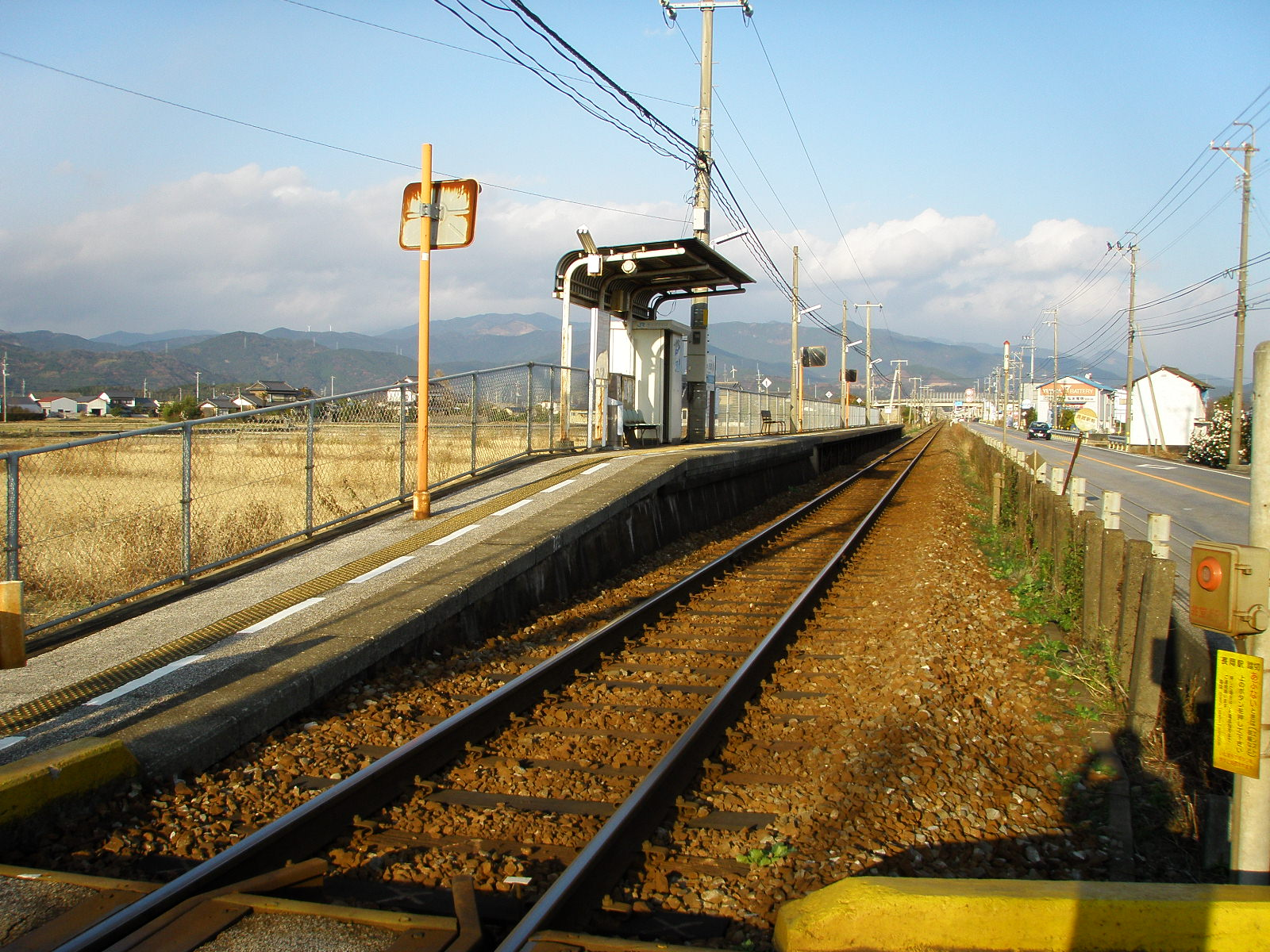
- Tosa-Nagaoka Station in 2007

General information
- Location: Nishiyama, Nankoku-shi, Kōchi-ken 783-0029; Japan
- Coordinates: 33°35′30″N 133°39′43″E
- Operator: JR Shikoku
- Line: ■ Dosan Line
- Distance: 114.1 km from Tadotsu
- Platforms: 1 side platform
- Tracks: 1

Construction
- Accessible: Yes - ramp from access road to platform

Other information
- Status: unstaffed
- Station code: D39

History
- Opened: 1 May 1952

Passengers
- FY2019: 82
Location
- Location within Kochi Prefecture Location within Japan

Tosa-Nagaoka Station (土佐長岡駅, Tosa-Nagaoka-eki) is a passenger railway station located in the city of Nankoku, Kōchi Prefecture, Japan. It is operated by JR Shikoku and has the station number "D39".

== Lines ==
The station is served by the JR Shikoku Dosan Line and is located 114.1 km from the beginning of the line at Tadotsu.

== Layout ==
The station, which is unstaffed, consists of a side platform serving a single track. There is a shelter on the platform for waiting passengers. A ramp leads up to the platform from the access road.

== Adjacent stations ==
«	Service	»
Dosan Line
Yamada-Nishimachi	-	Gomen

== History ==
The station opened on 1 May 1952 as a new station on the existing Dosan Line. At that time the station was operated by Japanese National Railways (JNR). With the privatization of JNR on 1 April 1987, control of the station passed to JR Shikoku.

== Surrounding area ==
- Japan National Route 195

== See also ==
- List of railway stations in Japan
