= Ōsugi Station =

Railway station in Ōtoyo, Kōchi Prefecture, Japan

D32 Ōsugi Station 大杉駅
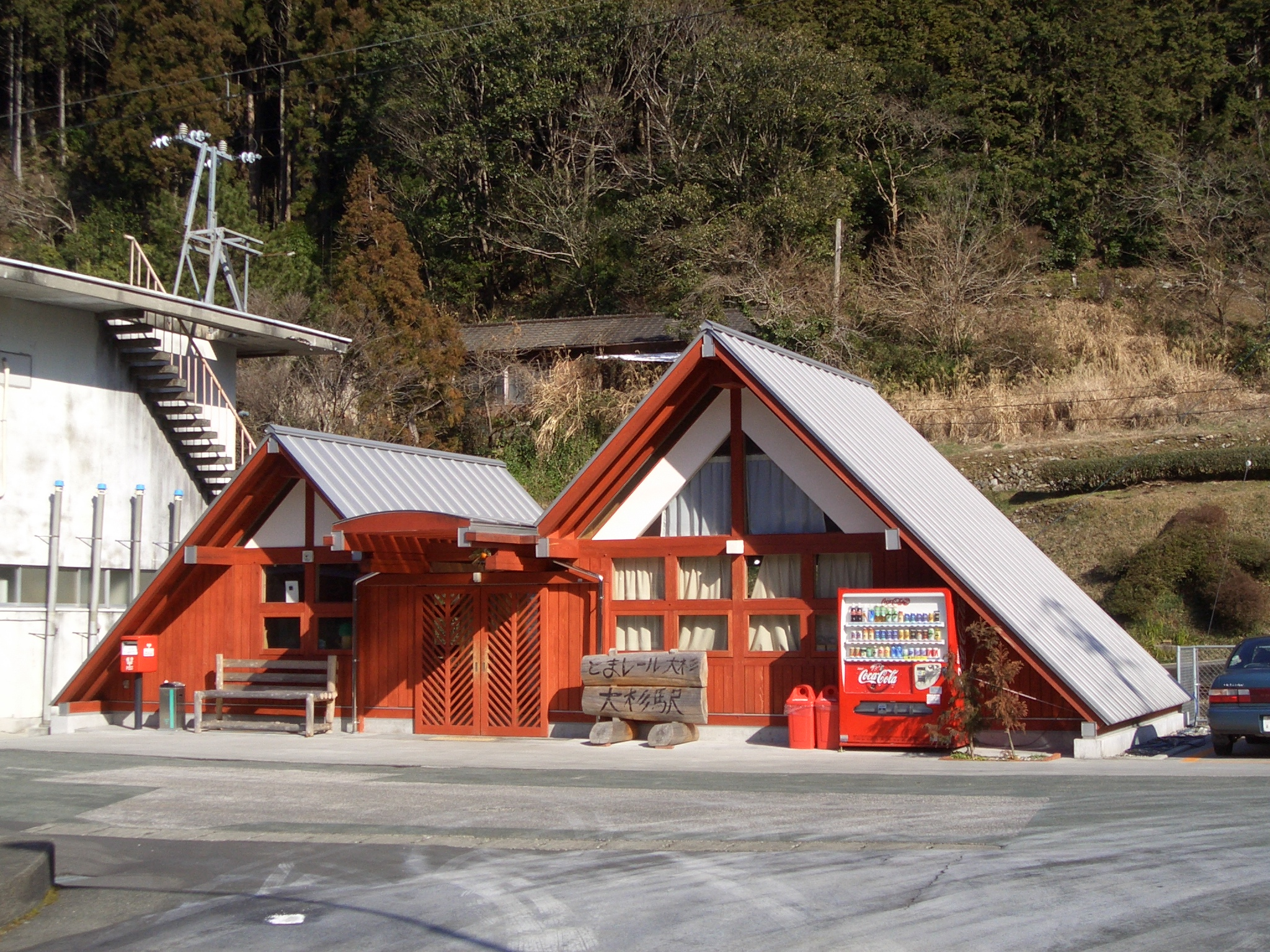
- Ōsugi Station in 2007

General information
- Location: Nakamuradaio, Ōtoyo, Nagaoka-gun, Kōchi-ken 789-0315; Japan
- Coordinates: 33°45′40″N 133°39′53″E
- Operator: JR Shikoku
- Line: ■ Dosan Line
- Distance: 87.2 km from Tadotsu
- Platforms: 1 island platform + 1 side platform (freight only)
- Tracks: 3

Construction
- Parking: Available
- Cycle facilities: Bike shed
- Accessible: Yes - level crossing to island platform

Other information
- Status: Kan'i itaku station
- Station code: D32

History
- Opened: 20 December 1932
- Rebuilt: 2005

Passengers
- FY2019: 122
Location
- Location within Kochi Prefecture Location within Japan

Ōsugi Station (大杉駅, Ōsugi-eki) is a passenger railway station located in the town of Ōtoyo, Nagaoka District, Kōchi Prefecture, Japan. It is operated by JR Shikoku and has the station number "D32".

== Lines ==
The station is served by the JR Shikoku Dosan Line and is located 87.2 km from the beginning of the line at Tadotsu. In addition to the local trains on the Dosan Line, some Nanpū limited express services from Okayama to Kōchi, Nakamura, and Sukumo, and Shimanto limited express services from Takamatsu to Kōchi, Nakamura, and Sukumo also stop at the station.

== Layout ==
The station consists of an island platform serving two tracks. The station building by the side of the tracks serves as a waiting room and also has a kan'i itaku ticket window. A pedestrian level crossing from the station building is used to access the island platform. There is also an enclosed shelter on the island platform for waiting passengers. Beside the station building is a freight platform and a third track which is used by track maintenance equipment.

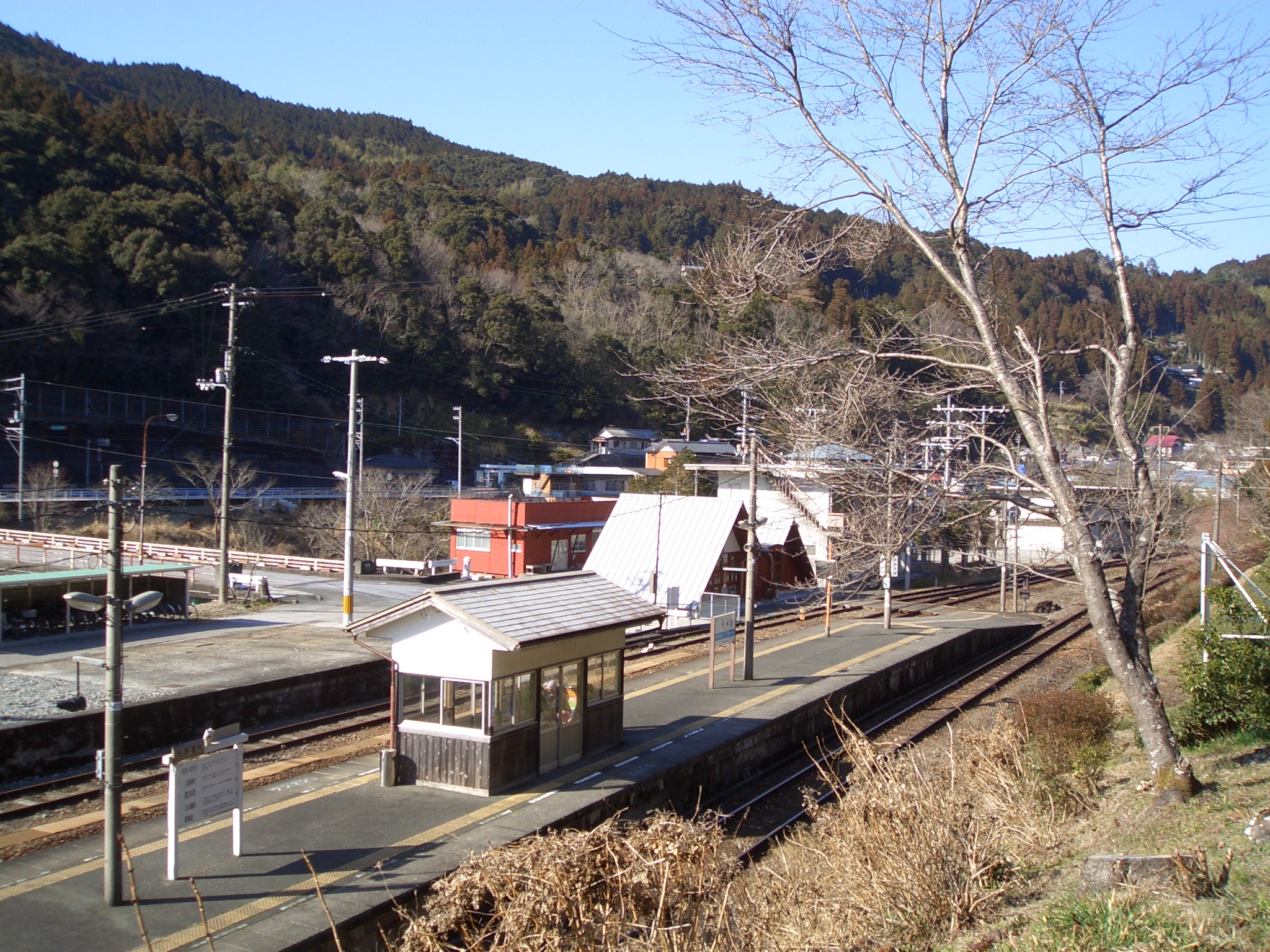
The station platform in 2007. The level crossing can be seen in the background.

== Adjacent stations ==
«	Service	»
Dosan Line
Tosa-Ananai	-	Tosa-Kitagawa

== History ==
The station opened on 20 December 1932 as the terminus of the then Kōchi Line which had been extended northwards from Kakumodani. At this time the station was operated by Japanese Government Railways, later becoming Japanese National Railways (JNR). With the privatization of JNR on 1 April 1987, control of the station passed to JR Shikoku. The original station building burnt down on 2 January 2004. A new building was constructed and opened on 12 March 2005. Students from a local junior high school participated in the design and construction of the new building.

== Surrounding area ==
- National Route 32 - runs parallel to the track on the other side of the Ananai River.
- Ōtoyo town hall - about 500 metres away on National Route 32.
- Sugi no Osugi - a pair of Japanese cedars joined at the base, said to be the world's tallest Japanese cedars and over 3,000 years old. The trees have been designated as a special national monument. The trees served as the inspiration for the design of the present station building.
- Ōtoyo Chōritsu Ōtoyo-chō Junior High School - students from this school participated in the station reconstruction project.

== See also ==
- List of railway stations in Japan
