= Toyonaga Station =

Railway station in Ōtoyo, Kōchi Prefecture, Japan

D29 Toyonaga Station 豊永駅
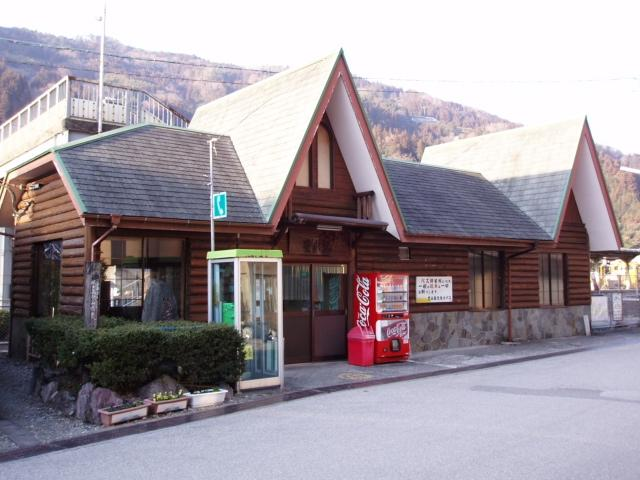
- Toyonaga Station in 2006

General information
- Location: Higashidoi, Ōtoyo, Nagaoka District, Kōchi Prefecture 789-0166; Japan
- Coordinates: 33°47′48″N 133°45′36″E
- Operator: JR Shikoku
- Line: ■ Dosan Line
- Distance: 76.7 km from Tadotsu
- Platforms: 1 island platform + 1 side platform (not in use)
- Tracks: 2 + 1 siding

Construction
- Accessible: No - overhead footbridge needed to access island platform

Other information
- Station code: D29

History
- Opened: 28 October 1934

Passengers
- FY2019: 18
Location
- Location within Kochi Prefecture Location within Japan

Toyonaga Station (豊永駅, Toyonaga-eki) is a passenger railway station located in the town of Ōtoyo, Nagaoka District, Kōchi Prefecture, Japan. It is operated by JR Shikoku and has the station number "D29".

== Lines ==
The station is served by the JR Shikoku Dosan Line and is located 76.7 km from the beginning of the line at Tadotsu.

== Layout ==
The station consists of an island platform serving two tracks. The station building by the side of the tracks is unstaffed and serves as a waiting room. A pedestrian footbridge connects the station building with the island platform and also leads to a side platform (not used for passengers) serving a siding. There is a shelter on the island platform for waiting passengers.

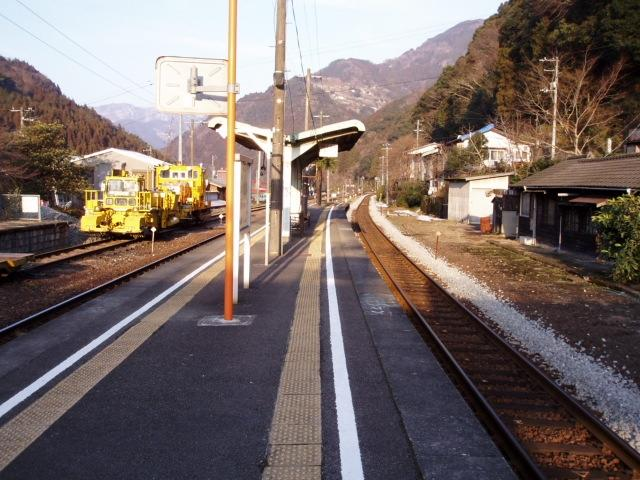
View of the station platforms in 2006 looking in the direction of Tadotsu

== Adjacent stations ==
«	Service	»
Dosan Line
Tosa-Iwahara	-	Ōtaguchi

== History ==
The station opened on 28 October 1934 as the terminus of the then Kōchi Line which had been extended northwards from Ōsugi. At this time the station was operated by Japanese Government Railways, later becoming Japanese National Railways (JNR). With the privatization of JNR on 1 April 1987, control of the station passed to JR Shikoku.

== Surrounding area ==
- National Route 32 - runs parallel to the tracks on the other side of the station building. It is possible to access the station platforms and building from here as there is an entrance to the footbridge.
- National Route 439 - crosses the track and forms a junction with National Route 32 just southwest of the station.

== See also ==
- List of railway stations in Japan
