= Tosa-Yamada Station =

Railway station in Kami, Kōchi Prefecture, Japan

Tosa-Yamada Station 土佐山田駅
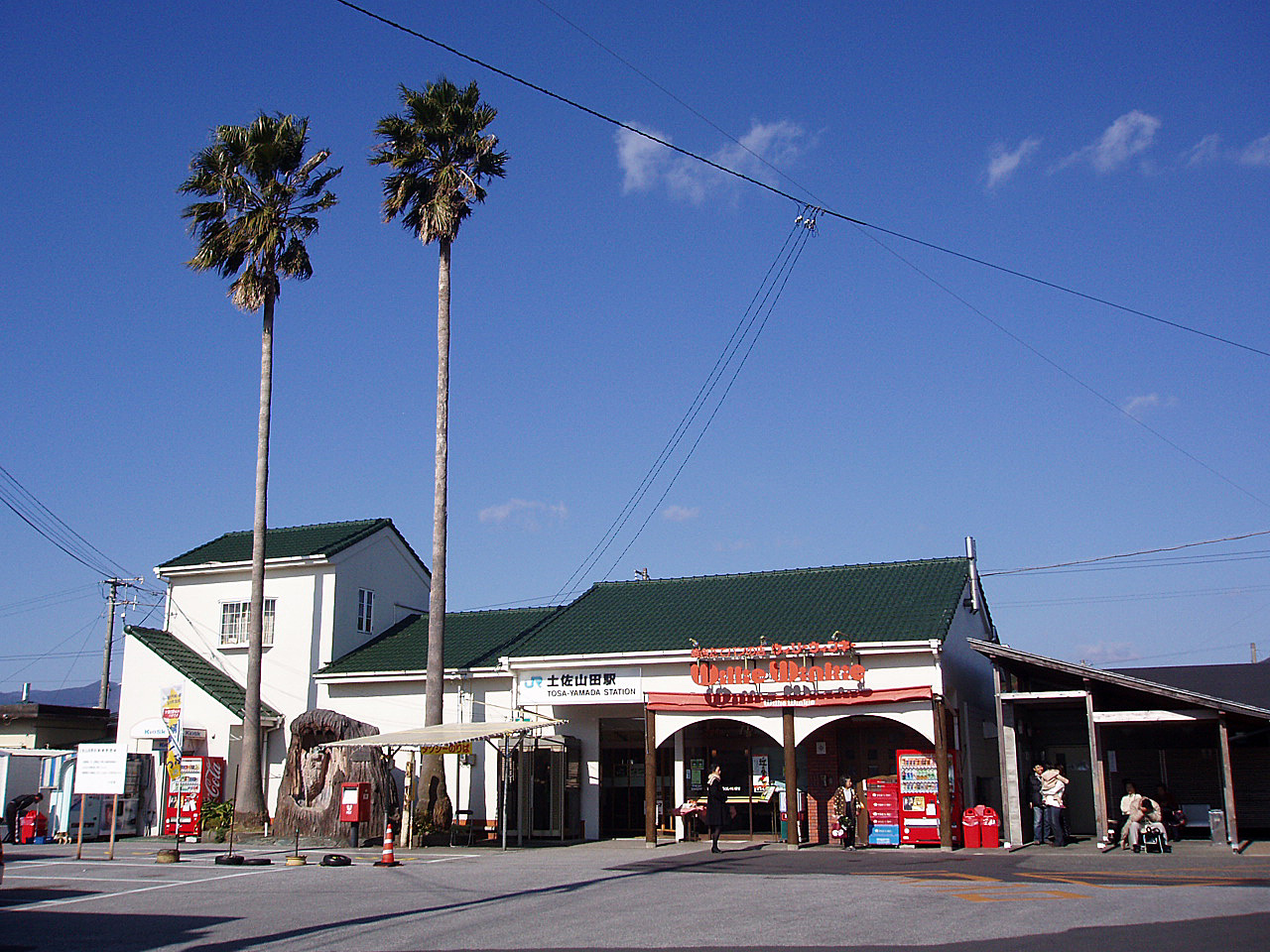
- Tosa-Yamada Station in 2006

General information
- Location: 1 Chome-5 Tosayamadachō Higashihonmachi, Kami-shi, Kōchi-ken 782-0031; Japan
- Coordinates: 33°36′26″N 133°41′05″E
- Operator: JR Shikoku
- Line: ■ Dosan Line
- Distance: 111.3 km from Tadotsu
- Platforms: 1 island + 1 side platforms
- Tracks: 5
- Connections: Bus stop

Construction
- Parking: Available
- Accessible: No - footbridge needed to access island platform

Other information
- Status: Staffed (Midori no Madoguchi)
- Station code: D37
- Website: Official website

History
- Opened: 5 December 1925

Passengers
- FY2018: 1912
Location
- Location within Kochi Prefecture Location within Japan

Tosa-Yamada Station (土佐山田駅, Tosa-Yamada-eki) is a passenger railway station located in the city of Kami, Kōchi Prefecture, Japan. It is the main station of the city of Kami and is operated by JR Shikoku with the station number "D37".

== Lines ==
The station is served by the JR Shikoku Dosan Line and is located 111.3 km from the beginning of the line at Tadotsu. In addition to the local trains on the Dosan Line, Nanpū limited express services from Okayama to Kōchi, Nakamura, and Sukumo, and Shimanto limited express services from Takamatsu to Kōchi, Nakamura, and Sukumo also stop at the station.

== Layout ==
The station consists of a side platform and an island platform serving 3 lines. The side platform connects to a station building which includes a waiting room, a Midori no Madoguchi ticket counter and a convenience store. An overhead footbridge is used to access the side platform. There is a siding north of the island platform.

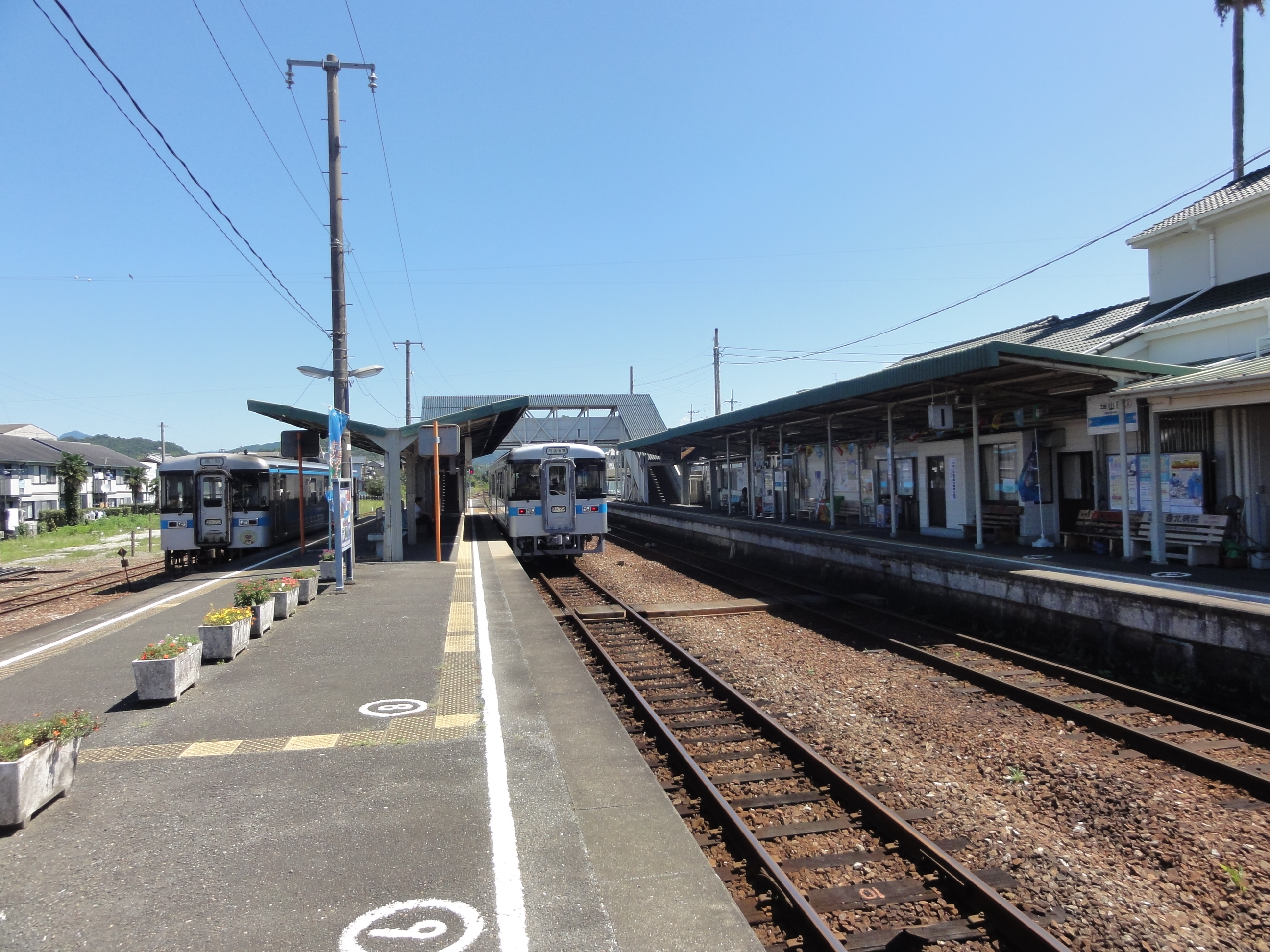
A view of the station platforms. A siding can be seen to the extreme left.

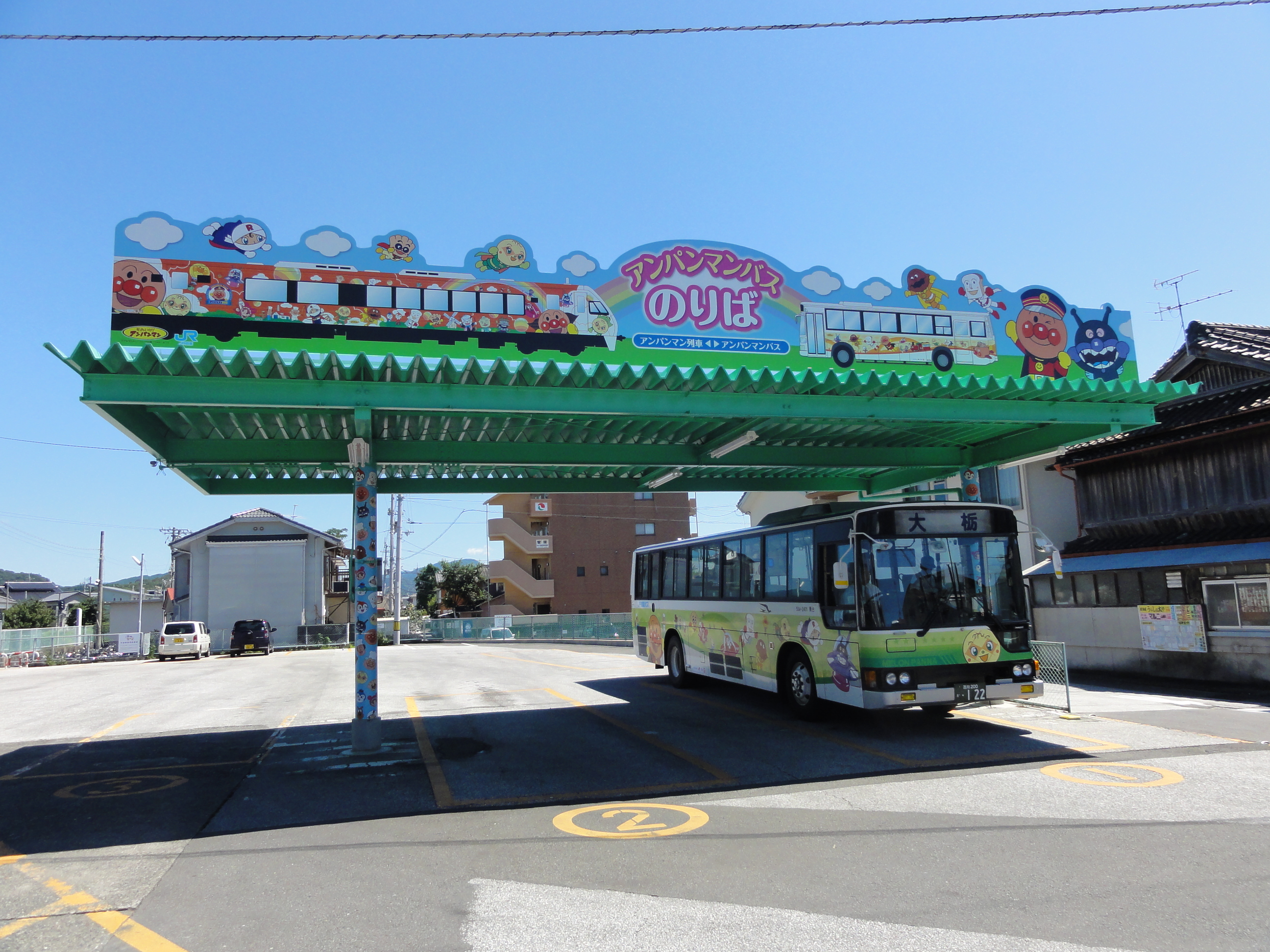
Bus stop in front of the station

== Adjacent stations ==
«	Service	»
Dosan Line
Shingai	-	Yamada-Nishimachi

== History ==
The station opened on 5 December 1925 as the terminus of the then Kochi Line when it was extended northwards from Kōchi. It became a through station on 21 June 1930 when the line was further extended to Kakumodani. At that time the station was operated by Japanese National Railways (JNR). With the privatization of JNR on 1 April 1987, control of the station passed to JR Shikoku.

== Surrounding area ==
- Kami City Hall
- Tosa Yamada Regional Joint Government Building

== See also ==
- List of railway stations in Japan
