= Genkai shūraku =

Places in Japan facing depopulation

Genkai shūraku (限界集落; literally limitative or limitational hamlet, also translated as marginal hamlet) is any village or hamlet within a merged town or village in Japan that has experienced depopulation and in danger of disappearing altogether, largely because half of the people living there reach the age of 65 and over.

Such villages are typically found in mountainous areas and remote islands. Communities facing these conditions have witnessed a rapid decline in local government functions, road maintenance, and ceremonial activities, and are at risk of losing these altogether.

== History ==
Akira Ōno, a professor of emeritus at Nagano University first proposed the concept in 1991 while teaching humanities at Kōchi University.

A number of surveys have been conducted to explore the phenomenon. In 2005 the Ministry of Agriculture, Forestry and Fisheries commissioned a rural development committee to do a survey on the true state of genkai shuraku (March 2006). According to the results, there were an estimated 1403 villages that were found to be in danger. These results were based on census results in agricultural villages. In April 2006, the Ministry of Land, Infrastructure, Transport and Tourism commissioned a survey on the state of depopulating areas. The report stated that, of the 62,273 villages that were visited, 775 of them were depopulating.

== Terms ==
Name	Definition	Explanation
Sonzoku shūraku (存続集落)	More than 50% of the population is no more than 55	Successors are ensured, and the next generation can continue the cooperative body
Jun genkai shūraku (準限界集落)	More than 50% of the population is over 55	The current body can run things, but there is difficulty in finding successors, and there is a potential of becoming genkai shuraku
Genkai shūraku (限界集落)	More than 50% of the population is over 65	The population is aging, and the function of the governing body is becoming limited
Shōmetsu shūraku (消滅集落)	Population of 0	The village has literally vanished, and the population is gone

== See also ==
- Aging of Japan
- Depopulation
- Ghost town
- Hikyō station
