= Nagaoka District, Kōchi =

District in Kōchi Prefecture, Japan

Coordinates: 33.792°N 133.671°E

Nagaoka (長岡郡, Nagaoka-gun) is a district located in Kōchi Prefecture, Japan.

As of 2003, the district has an estimated population of 10,393 and a density of 23.14 persons per km^{2}. The total area is 449.15 km^{2}.

== Towns and villages ==
- Motoyama
- Ōtoyo
